= Helmut Swiczinsky =

Austrian architect (1944–2025)

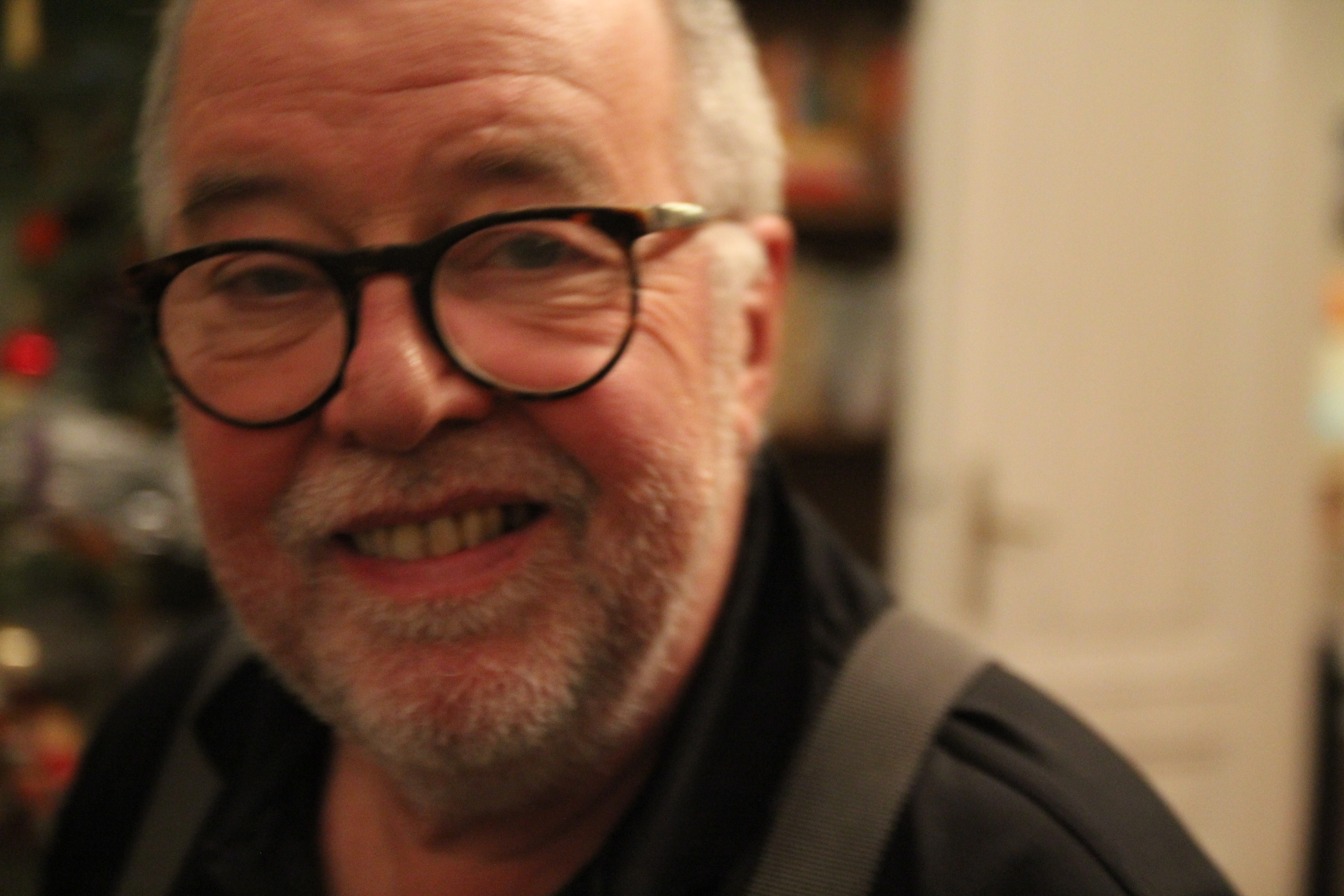
Swiczinsky in 2010

Helmut Swiczinsky (13 January 1944 – 29 July 2025) was an Austrian architect.

== Life and career ==
Swiczinsky was born in Poznań on 13 January 1944. He studied architecture at the Vienna University of Technology and the Architectural Association in London.

He founded the Viennese group of architects Coop Himmelb(l)au together with Wolf Dieter Prix and Michael Holzer in 1968. This company is known worldwide for its spectacular buildings. As a major member of this office Swiczinsky designed a lot of deconstructivist projects. In 2000 he stepped down as managing director and left the company in 2006 as partner.

In 1973 he was a visiting professor at the Architectural Association in London. Swiczinsky was a permanent member of the European Academy of Sciences and Arts based in Salzburg.

Swiczinsky died following a long illness on 29 July 2025, at the age of 81.

== Memberships ==
Swiczinsky was a member of the European Academy of Sciences and Arts.

== Awards ==
Together with his architecture colleague Prix he received, among other awards:

- Schelling Architekturpreis 1992
- the German Architecture Prize (Deutscher Architekturpreis) 1999
- the Great Austrian State Prize 2000
- the European Steel Award 2001
- Decoration of honor for services to the State of Vienna 2002

== Exhibitions ==
Among other exhibitions that Swiczinsky staged were:

- 1968 Villa Rosa Vienna, Austria
- 2012: Coop Himmelb(l)au: 7+, Architekturforum Aedes, Berlin
- 2015: Exhibition about Coop Himmelb(l)au in the German Architecture Museum (DAM), Frankfurt, Germany

== Literature ==
Among other books that Swiczinsky wrote were:

- Kristin Feireiss; Jürgen Commerell: COOP HIMMELB(L)AU. The Vienna Trilogy + One Cinema. Three Residential Buildings in Vienna and a Cinema in Dresden. Berlin 1999
- Peter Noever: Gerald Zugmann - Blue Universe. Transforming Models into Pictures. Architectural Projects by COOP HIMMELB(L)AU. Hatje Cantz Verlag, Ostfildern-Ruit 2002
- Martina Kandeler-Fritsch, Thomas Kramer: Get Off of My Cloud. Wolf D. Prix. Coop Himmelb(l)au. Texte 1968-2005. Hatje Cantz Verlag, Ostfildern-Ruit 2005
- Kristin Feireiss: Dynamic Forces. COOP HIMMELB(L)AU. BMW Welt München. Prestel Verlag, München, Berlin, London, New York 2007, ISBN 978-3-7913-3875-0.
- Peter Noever: COOP HIMMELB(L)AU. Beyond the Blue. Prestel, München / Berlin / London / New York 2007, ISBN 978-3-7913-3962-7.
- Sylvia Lavin: Central Los Angeles Area High school #9 for the visual and performing arts, HS#9 / CoopHimmelb(l)au. Essay. (Text: Karolin Schmidbaur); Prestel, München / Berlin / London / New York 2010, ISBN 978-3-7913-4433-1.

== Buildings and Projects with the Participation of Helmut Swiczinsky ==
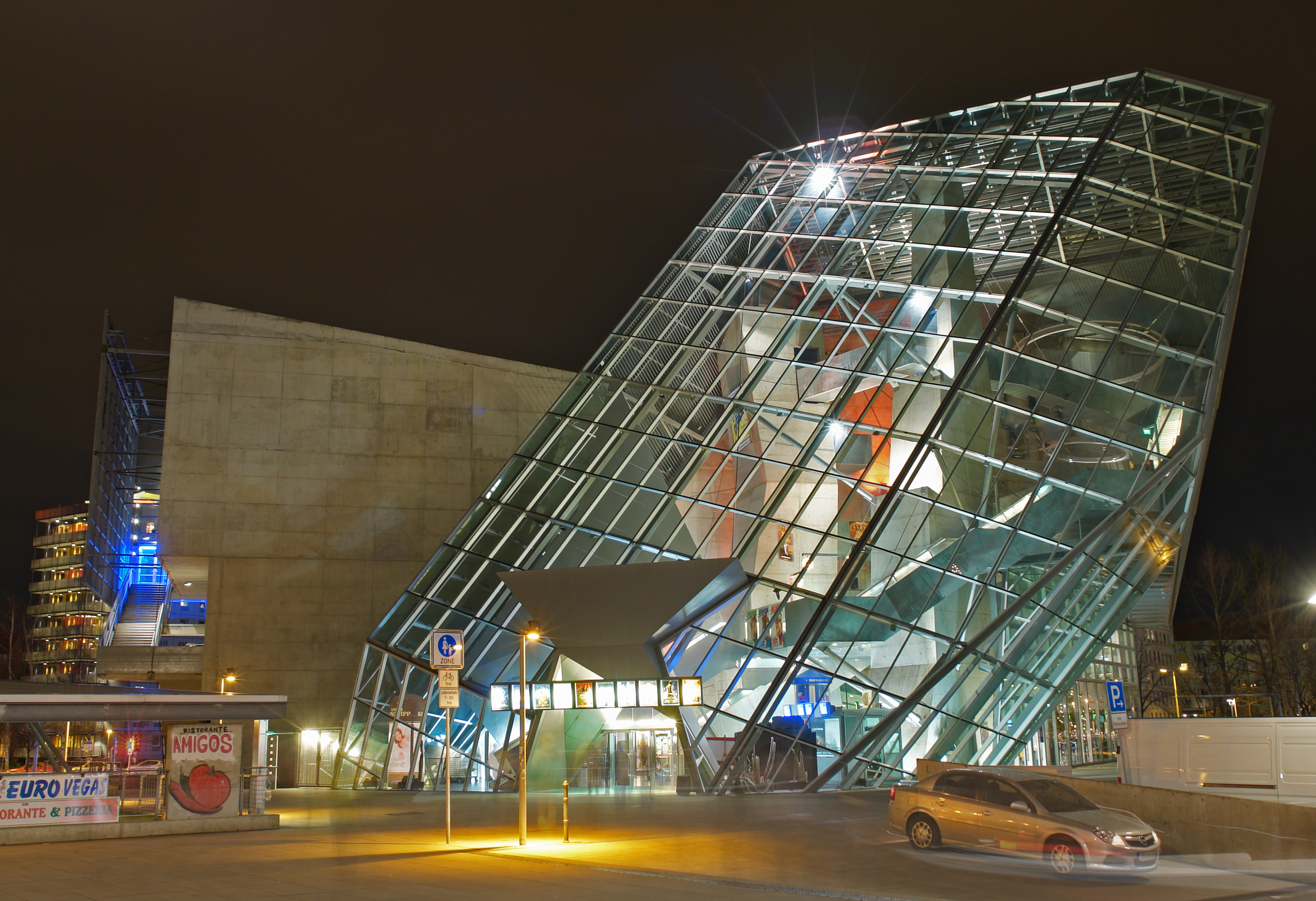
UFA-Palast Prager Straße, Dresden

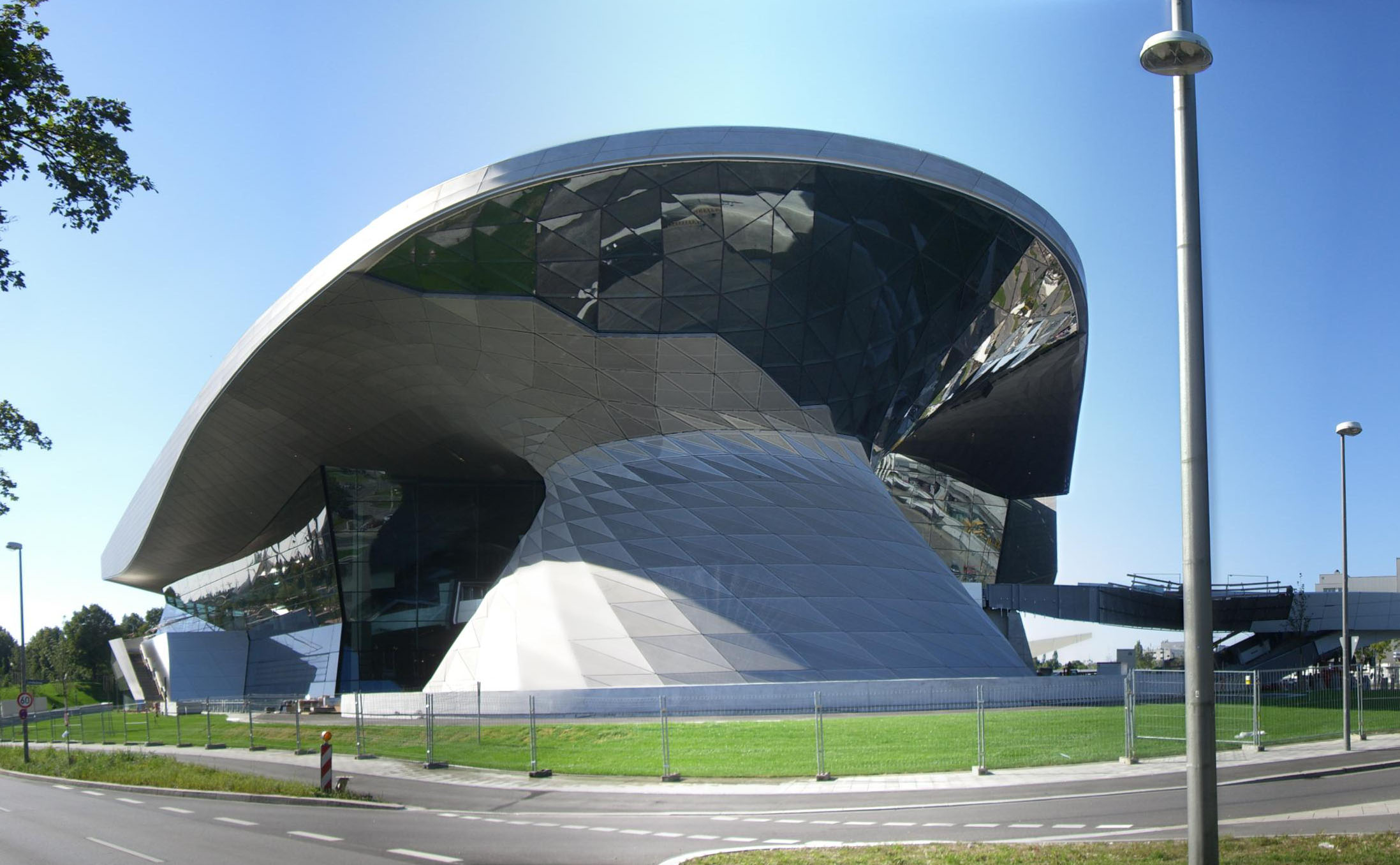
BMW Welt, Munich

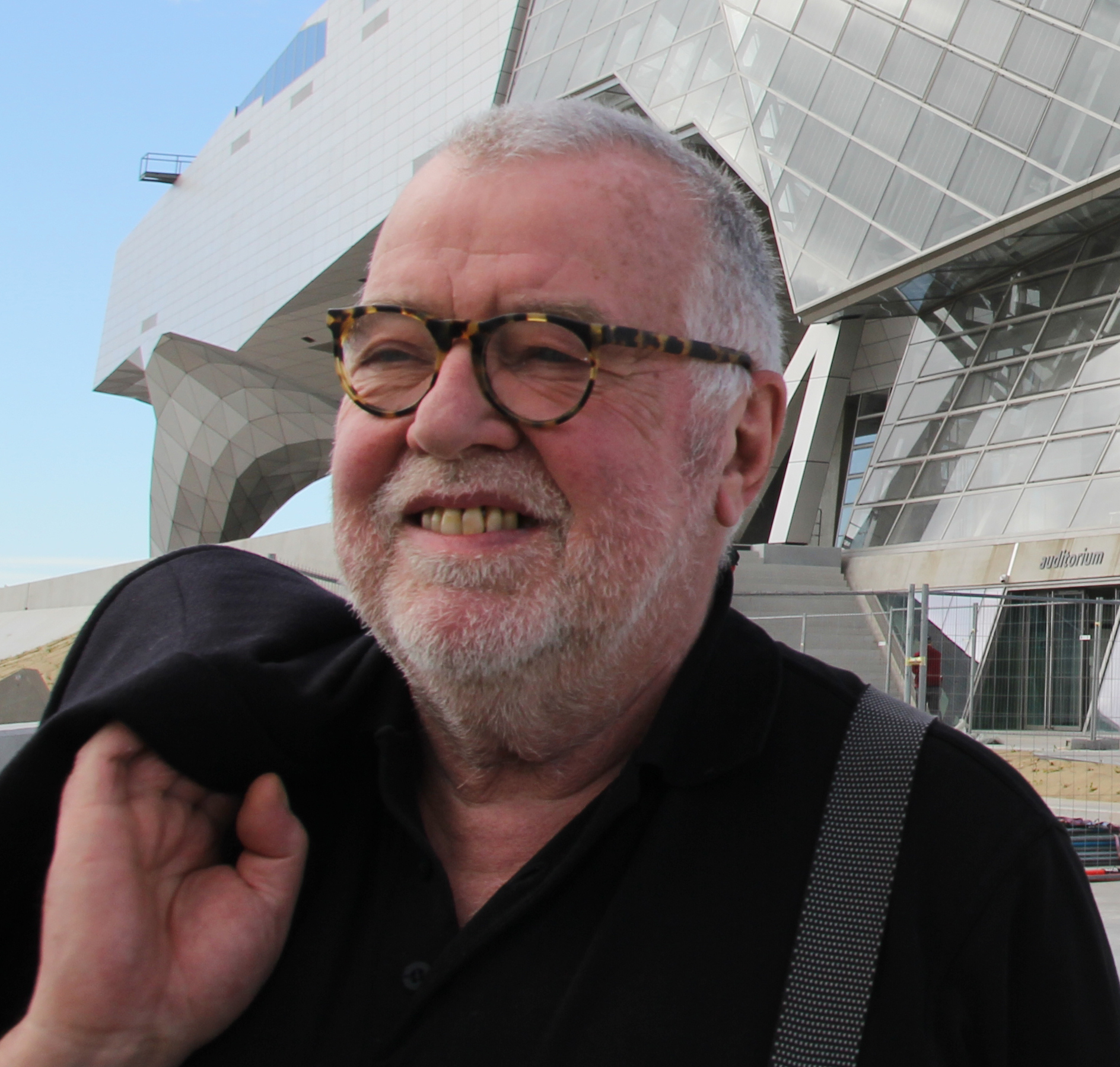
Swiczinsky in 2010

Among other projects that Swiczinsky undertook were:

- Villa Rosa, Vienna, 1968
- Wolke, Vienna, 1968
- Reiss Bar, Vienna, 1977
- Flammenflügel, Technische Universität Graz, happening 9 December 1980, 8.35 pm
- Roter Engel, Vienna, 1981
- Rooftop Remodeling Falkestrasse, Vienna, Austria, 1988
- FunderMax, Sankt Veit an der Glan, Österreich, 1988/1989
- Groninger Museum: Pavillon Bildende Kunst, Groningen, Netherlands, 1994
- Ufa-Kristallpalast auf der Dresden, 1998
- SEG Apartment Tower, Vienna, Austria, 1998
- SEG Apartment Block Remise, Vienna, 2000
- Gasometer B, Vienna, 2001
- Expo.02: Forum Arteplage, Biel/Bienne, Suisse 2002
- Wettbewerbsbeitrag (2. Preis) for the Egyptian Museum, Kairo, Egypt
- Academy of Fine Arts, Munich, 2005
- Büro- und Wohnanlage Schlachthausgasse, Vienna, 2005
- Akron Art Museum, Akron (Ohio), USA, 2007
- Centro Cultural JVC und Restaurant Mosku, Guadalajara, Mexico
- BMW Welt, Munich, Germany, 2007
- Central Los Angeles Area High School #9, Los Angeles, Kalifornia, United States, 2008
- Seat of the European Central Bank, Frankfurt, Germany
- Musée des Confluences, Lyon, France
