= Wolf Dieter Prix =

Austrian architect

- Born: 13 December 1942 (age 83); Vienna, Reichsgau Wien, Germany
- Education: Vienna University of Technology
- Occupation: Architect
- Partner: Helmut Swiczinsky
- Awards: e. g. New York Progressive Architecture Award (three times), Lifetime Achievement Award from The Association for Computer-Aided-Design in Architecture (ACADIA)
- Practice: Associated architectural firm[s]
- Buildings: BMW Welt in Munich, the Akron Art Museum in Ohio, Musée des Confluences, Lyon, France
- Projects: Rooftop Remodeling Falkestrasse in Vienna, Martin Luther Church in Hainburg an der Donau
- Design: Vodoel (armchair), 1988, kitchen "Mal-Zeit" (meal -time) for EWE, 1987, Jammer Coat hides the wearer from Google, 2014
- Website: coop-himmelblau.at

Wolf Dieter Prix (born 13 December 1942) is an Austrian architect. In 1968 he co-founded the architects' cooperative Coop Himmelb(l)au, which has an international reputation as an important representative of deconstructivism.

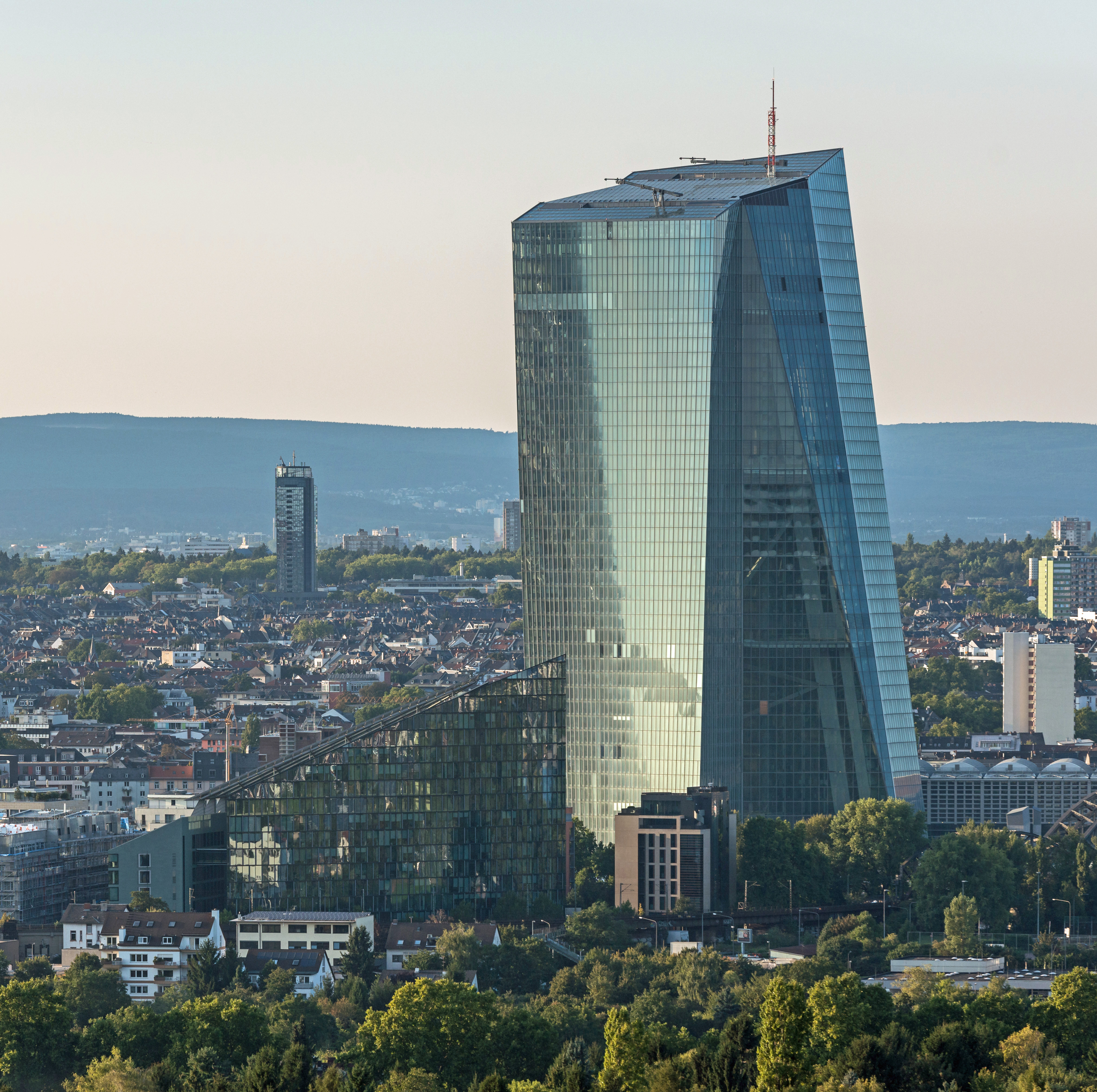
Seat of the European Central Bank, Frankfurt/Main, Germany (2014)

== Life ==
=== Early life ===
Prix was born on 13 December 1942 in Vienna. Wolf Prix's father was an architect; Wolf looked over his father's shoulder in the office. He went to the museum with him and asked: “Why don’t we finish the Tower of Babel?” The visit of the priory La Tourette (designed by Le Corbusier), located near Lyon, France, was his inspiration to study architecture.

=== Education ===
Wolf Prix studied at the Vienna University of Technology, the Architectural Association in London and the Southern California Institute of Architecture in Los Angeles, USA.

=== Career ===
In 1968 he founded the Viennese architects' cooperative Himmelb(l)au together with Helmut Swiczinsky and Michael Holzer. Since Holzer (1971) and Swiczinsky (2001) left the office, Prix is the only remaining founding partner of the office. He currently heads it as Design Principal and managing director. In 2006 he was commissioner for the Austrian pavilion at the 10th Venice Architecture Biennale.

=== Teaching ===
He taught as a visiting professor at the Architectural Association in London in 1984 and in 1990 at Harvard University in Cambridge, Massachusetts. From 1985 to 1995 Prix was adjunct professor at the SCI-Arc in Los Angeles. In 1993 he was appointed full professor for architectural design at the University of Applied Arts in Vienna. From 2003 to 2012 he was a board member at the Institute for Architecture, head of the Studio Prix and vice-rector of the university. He has been a faculty member at Columbia University in New York since 1998. At the University of California in Los Angeles (UCLA) he took over the Harvey S. Perloff Chair in 1999 and a visiting professorship in 2001.

== Memberships ==
From 1995 to 1997, Wolf Prix was a member of the architecture advisory board at the Austrian Federal Ministry for Science and Research. He is a member of the Austrian Art Senate, the European Academy of Sciences and Arts and the advisory board for Building Culture. He is also a member of the Austrian Chamber of Architects, the Santa Clara Chamber of Architects in Cuba, the Royal Institute of British Architects (RIBA), the American Institute of Architects (AIA) and the Italian Chamber of Architects. He is an honorary member of the Association of German Architects BDA.

== Awards ==
Wolf Prix has received numerous awards, such as the City of Vienna Prize for Architecture in 1988, the New York Progressive Architecture Award three times from 1989 to 1991 and the Grand Austrian State Prize for Architecture in 1999. In 2001 he received an honorary doctorate from the Universidad de Palermo in Buenos Aires, and in 2002 the Decoration of Honour for Services to the Republic of Austria for Services to the State of Vienna. In 2002 he became an officer of the French Ordre des Arts et des Lettres. In 2004 he received the Annie Spink Award for Excellence in Architectural Education for his commitment to education and teaching, in 2008 the Jencks Award for his special contribution to architecture in theory and practice and the RIBA European Award for BMW World. The Federal Austrian President Heinz Fischer awarded him in May 2009 the Austrian Decoration for Science and Art in recognition of his outstanding creative achievements. In 2011 he was made honorary citizenship of the city of Busan, South Korea. 2013 he received the Hessian Cultural Prize (master builder of dreams). 2021 Prix got the Lifetime Achievement Award from ACADIA.

== Exhibitions ==
- 1988: Deconstructivist Architecture exhibition at Museum of Modern Art MoMA New York
- 2012: Coop Himmelb(l)au: 7+, Aedes am Pfefferberg, Berlin

== Literature (selection) ==
- Gert Winkler: Coop Himmelblau (you live in Vienna). An exhibition and a book. Peter Welermair, Galerie im Taxispalais, Innsbruck 1975 Catalog list Austrian National Library
- Graz University of Technology; Gallery H: COOP HIMMELB(L)AU. Architecture has to burn. Graz 1980
- COOP HIMMELB (L) AU. Architecture is now. Hatje Cantz, Stuttgart; Rizzoli, New York; Thames & Hudson, London 1993
- Gallery Aedes: COOP HIMMELB(L)AU. Skyline. Project for the Hamburg Bauforum 1985. Berlin 1984
- Gallery Aedes: Open Architecture. Berlin 1984
- Architectural gallery: COOP HIMMELB(L)AU. Open architecture. Housing complex Vienna 2. Munich 1986
- Philip Johnson, Mark Wigley: Deconstructivist Architecture. The Museum of Modern Art, New York 1988
- Architectural Association London: COOP HIMMELB (L) AU. Blue box. Folio XXIII, London 1988
- COOP HIMMELB(L)AU. 6 Projects for 4 Cities. Catalog Recent Work. Jürgen Häusser Verlag, Darmstadt 1990
- Aedes Gallery and Architecture Forum: Hans Hollein - COOP HIMMELB (L) AU. Mission statement Expo '95 Vienna. Berlin 1990
- Oliver Gruenberg, Robert Hahn, Doris Knecht: COOP HIMMELBLAU. The fascination of the city. 2nd edition, Jürgen Häusser Verlag, Darmstadt 1992
- Center Georges Pompidou: COOP HIMMELB (L) AU. Construire le ciel. Paris 1992
- Museum of Contemporary Art: Paradise Cage. Los Angeles 1996
- Gudrun Hausegger, Martina Kandeler-Fritsch: Wolf D. Prix Helmut Swiczinsky. COOP HIMMELB(L)AU Austria. Biennale di Venezia 1996, Sixth International Exhibition of Architecture. Ritter Verlag, Klagenfurt 1996
- Kristin Feireiss; Jürgen Commerell: COOP HIMMELB (L) AU. The Vienna Trilogy + One Cinema. Three Residential Buildings in Vienna and a Cinema in Dresden. Berlin 1999
- Peter Noever: Gerald Zugmann - Blue Universe. Transforming Models into Pictures. Architectural Projects by COOP HIMMELB (L) AU. Hatje Cantz Verlag, Ostfildern-Ruit 2002
- Martina Kandeler-Fritsch, Thomas Kramer: Get Off of My Cloud. Wolf D. Prix. Coop Himmelb (l) au. Texts 1968–2005. Hatje Cantz Verlag, Ostfildern-Ruit 2005
- Kristin Feireiss: Dynamic Forces. COOP HIMMELB (L) AU. BMW World Munich. Prestel Verlag, Munich, Berlin, London, New York 2007, ISBN 978-3-7913-3875-0.
- Peter Noever: COOP HIMMELB (L) AU. Beyond the blue. Prestel, Munich / Berlin / London / New York 2007, ISBN 978-3-7913-3962-7.
- Sylvia Lavin: Central Los Angeles Area High School # 9 for the visual and performing arts, HS # 9 / CoopHimmelb(l)au. Essay. (Text: Karolin Schmidbaur); Prestel, Munich / Berlin / London / New York 2010, ISBN 978-3-7913-4433-1.
- Wolf D. Prix, Coop Himmelb(l)au, Kristin Feireiss, Günther Feuerstein, Thom Mayne: Out of the Clouds. Wolf dPrix: Sketches 1967–2020. Birkhäuser Verlag, Basel / Berlin / Boston 2022, ISBN 978-3-03562-532-5.
