= Coop Himmelb(l)au =

Architectural firm

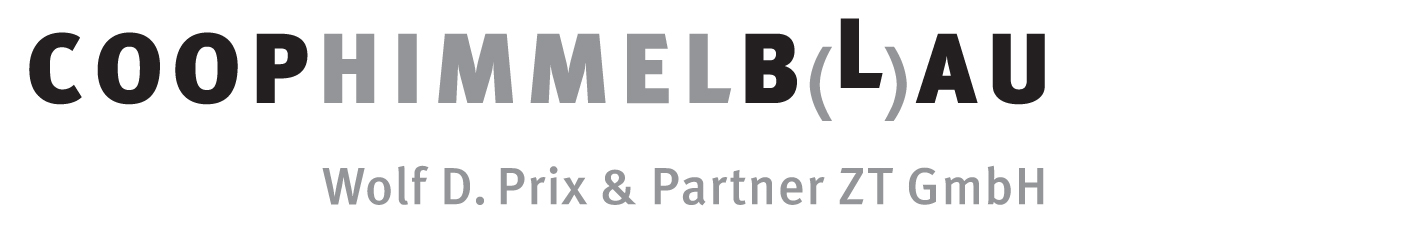
- Type: GmbH
- Founded: 1968 in Vienna, Austria
- Founders: Wolf Prix; Helmut Swiczinsky; Michael Holzer
- Headquarters: Vienna, Austria
- Key people: Wolf Prix; Harald Krieger; Karolin Schmidbaur
- Services: Architecture, design
- Number of employees: 150
- Website: coop-himmelblau.at

Coop Himmelb(l)au (a pun meaning Coop Sky Building and Coop Sky Blue) is an architecture, urban planning, design, and art firm founded in 1968 by Wolf D. Prix, Helmut Swiczinsky and Michael Holzer in Vienna, Austria.

== History ==
Coop Himmelb(l)au was established in 1968 by Wolf D. Prix, Helmut Swiczinsky, and Michael Holzer in Vienna and has been active in the fields of architecture, urban planning, design and art ever since. In 1988 a second studio was opened in Los Angeles. Further project offices are located in Frankfurt, Germany, and Paris, France.

The architecture studio Coop Himmelb(l)au is now run by Wolf D. Prix, Harald Krieger, Karolin Schmidbaur and project partners. The project partners include Michael Beckert, Luzie Giencke, Andrea Graser, Helmut Holleis, Markus Pillhofer, Markus Prossnigg, Wolfgang Reicht, Frank Stepper and Michael Volk. Michael Holzer early left the office in 1971. Helmut Swiczinsky retired from operational business in 2001, and his final retirement was in 2006. Wolf D. Prix heads the studio as Design Principal / CEO. From 2000 to 2011 Wolfdieter Dreibholz was managing director and partner of Coop Himmelb(l)au. Harald Krieger became partner and managing director of COOP HIMMELB(L)AU Europe GmbH in Frankfurt am Main in 2003. In 2011 he also took over the financial management of the studio as CFO. Karolin Schmidbaur became a partner in the office in 1996, and she is currently the design and managing partner of the office in Vienna (since 2009) and head of the studio in Los Angeles (since 2003).

The group's works were featured in the Museum of Modern Art's Deconstructivist Architecture exhibition in 1988, curated by Philip Johnson and Mark Wigley. As a result, Coop Himmelb(l)au was henceforth included in the group of deconstructivist architects. The bureau never officially included itself in this group. However, certain working practices, such as collage, and the architectural language show similarities with other architects in this direction.

World-renowned institutions such as the Getty Center in Los Angeles, the Museum of Applied Arts, Vienna (MAK) and the Centre Pompidou show works by Coop Himmelb(l)au in their permanent exhibitions. In 1996, Coop Himmelb(l)au was invited to represent Austria at the 6th International Venice Biennale. Since then, the office has been represented there regularly and has presented projects such as the Musée des Confluences in Lyon and the Guangzhou Opera House. The Musée des Confluences in Lyon was also presented from 2002 to 2003 at the Latent Utopias exhibition in Graz. Coop Himmelb(l)au was also represented several times in the Aedes East Gallery in Berlin, for example in the exhibitions Skyline 1985, The Vienna Trilogy + One Cinema 1998 and in an exhibition for the competition for the BMW Experience and Delivery Center in 2002. In In the same year Coop Himmelb(l)au was present at the 8th Architecture Biennale in Venice with the BMW Welt projects and a design for the new World Trade Center. In 2007/2008 the office was the subject of the exhibition COOP HIMMELB(L)AU. Beyond the Blue of the MAK in Vienna. At the 11th Architecture Biennale in Venice, Coop Himmelb(l)au was represented with two contributions: Astroballon 1969 Revisited – Feedback Space in the Arsenale and Brain City Lab in the Italian Pavilion. In 2009 the exhibition COOP HIMMELB(L)AU. Beyond the Blue could be seen at the Wexner Center for the Arts, Columbus (Ohio).

Coop Himmelb(l)au was responsible for the design of several exhibitions, for example Paradise Cage: Kiki Smith and Coop Himmelb(l)au, which was shown in 1996 at the Museum of Contemporary Art, Los Angeles. One of the best-known is the exhibition Rudi Gernreich: Fashion will go out of Fashion from 2000 for the Styrian Autumn in Graz, which was later shown in Philadelphia.

Since 2018, the firm was designing three projects in Russia funded by the Russian government — a museum and a theater in Kemerovo, the SKA Arena in Saint Petersburg, and a cultural cluster including an opera house in occupied Crimea. In January 2022, the firm's partners were sanctioned by the president of Ukraine for doing business in the Russian-occupied Crimean peninsula, which Ukraine considers illegal. After the beginning of the Russian invasion of Ukraine in February 2022, Coop Himmelb(l)au continued working on the projects and stopped only in October 2022, when architects from the EU countries were prohibited to collaborate with Russian officials. By that time, the SKA Arena was completed, and the other two projects were taken over by Russian construction companies and were on the way to be completed as of 2025.

== Selected projects ==
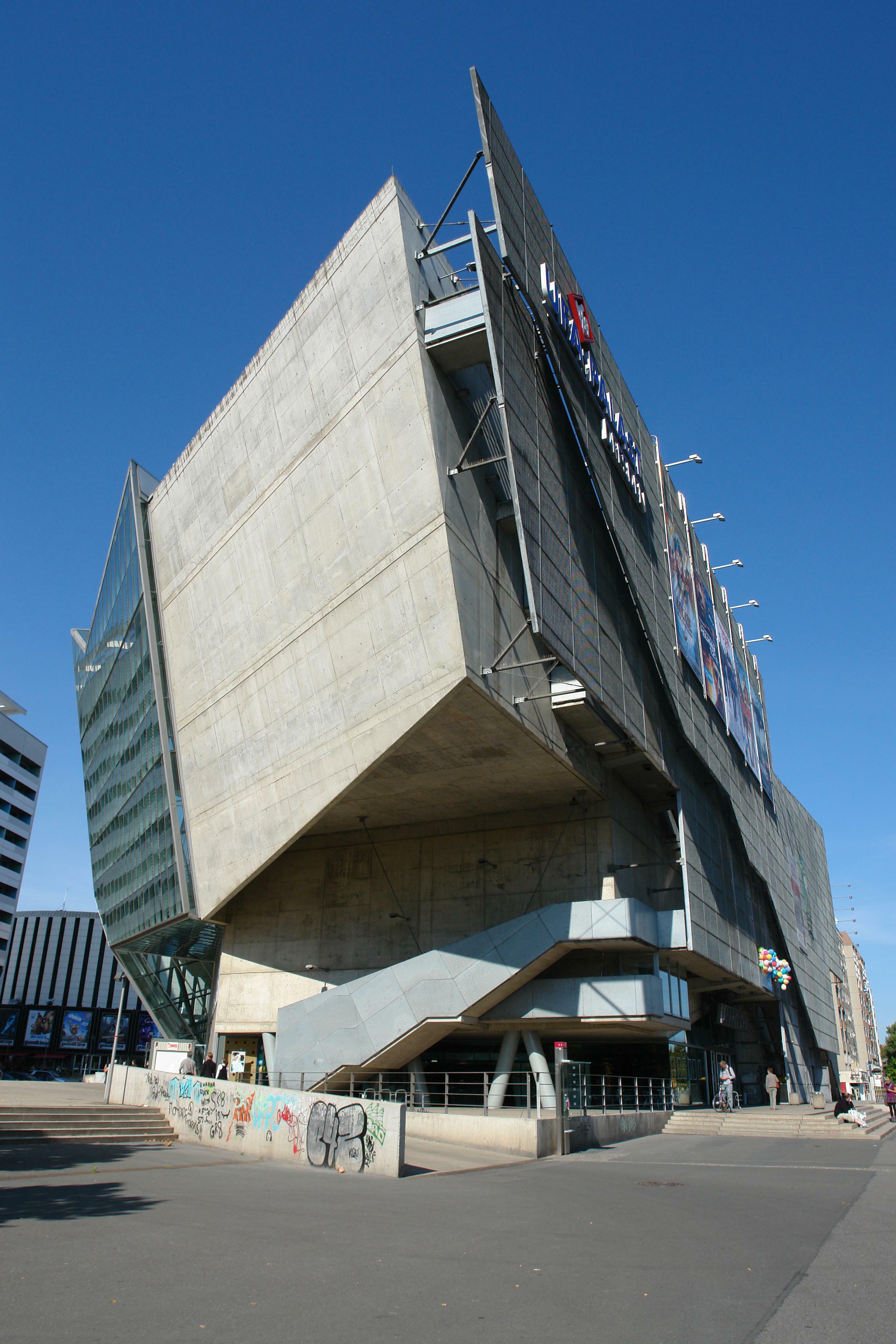
Ufa-Kristallpalast

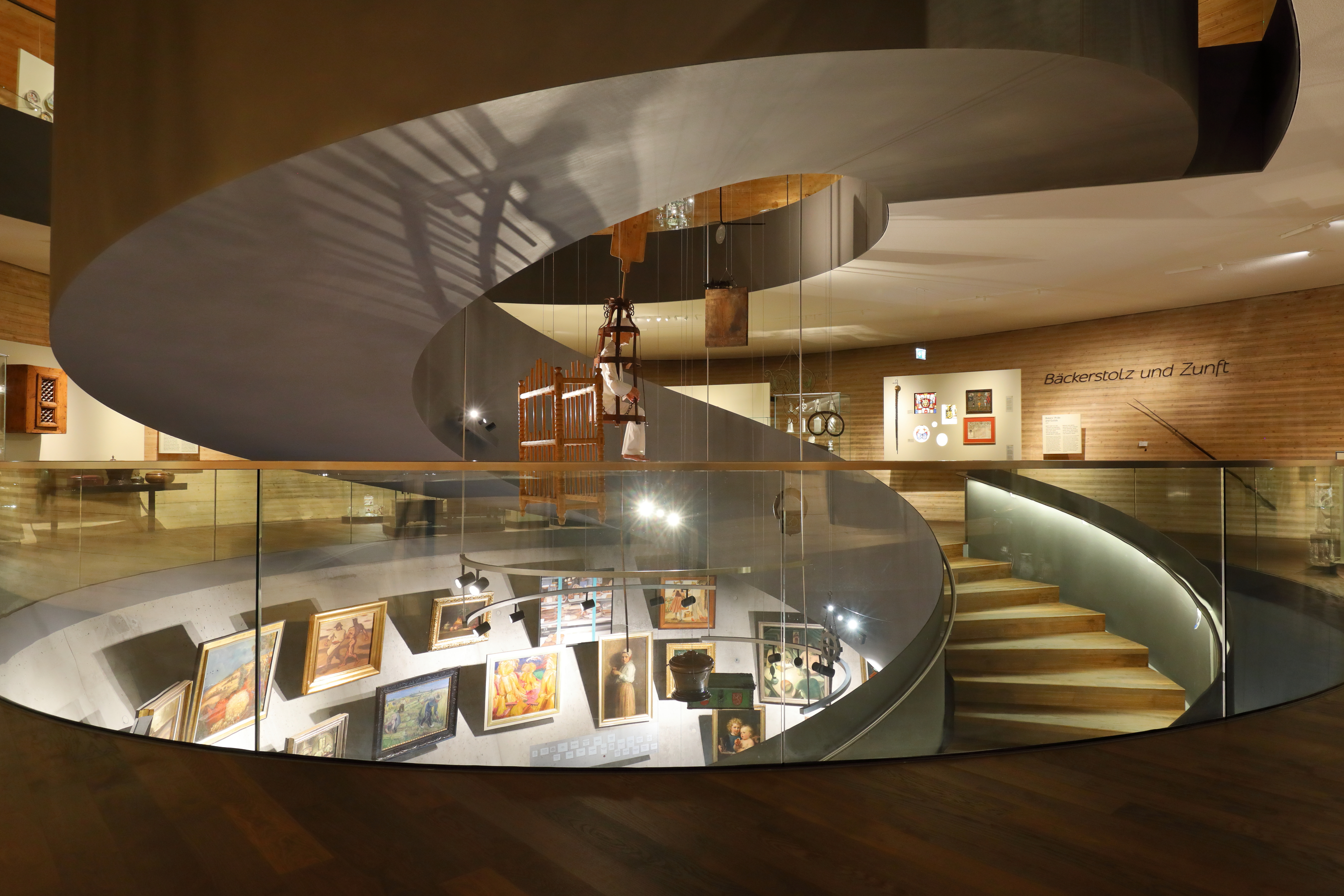
Museum „Paneum“ in Asten, Austria (2017)

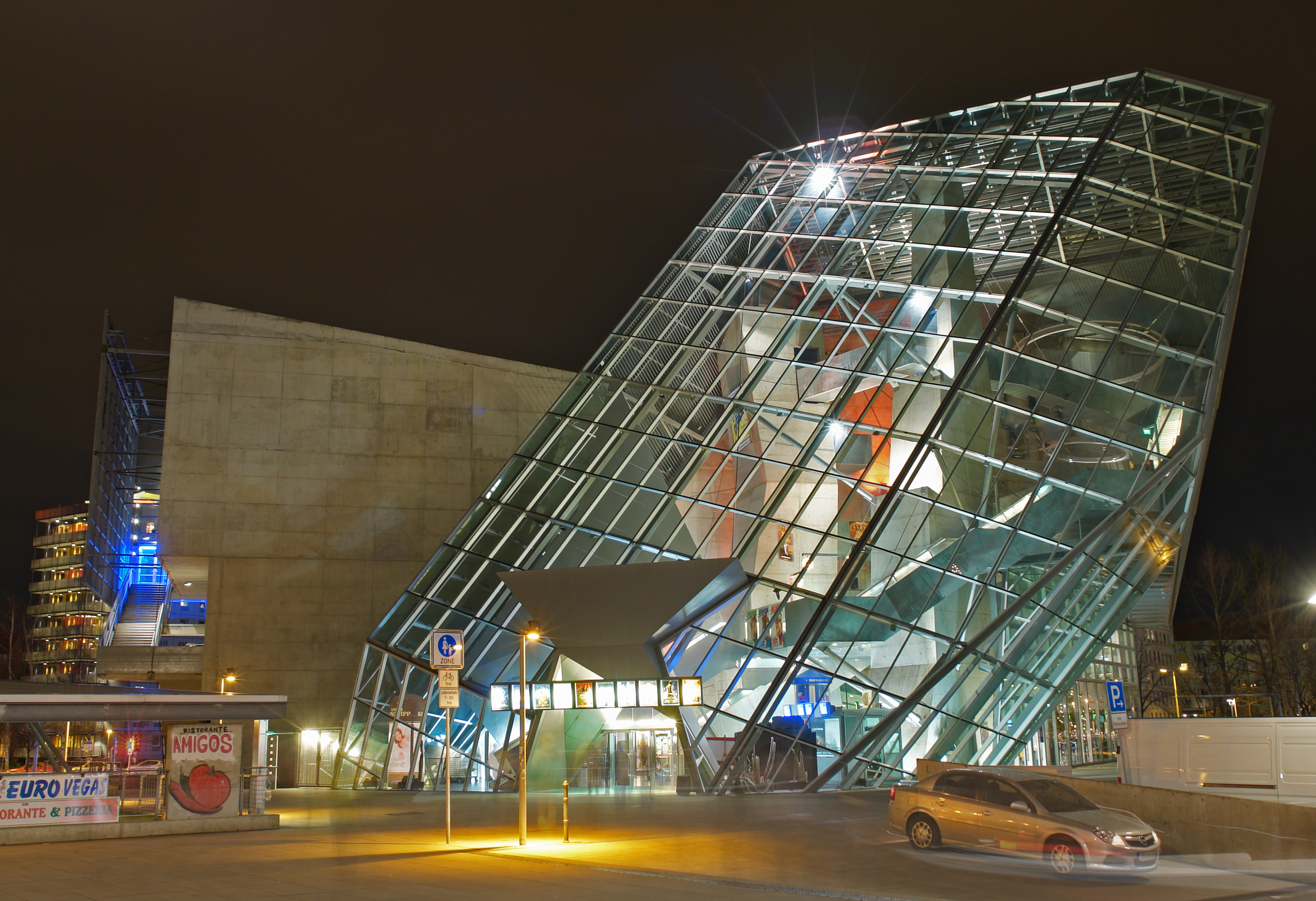
Ufa-Kristallpalast, Dresden, night

Musée des Confluences, Lyon

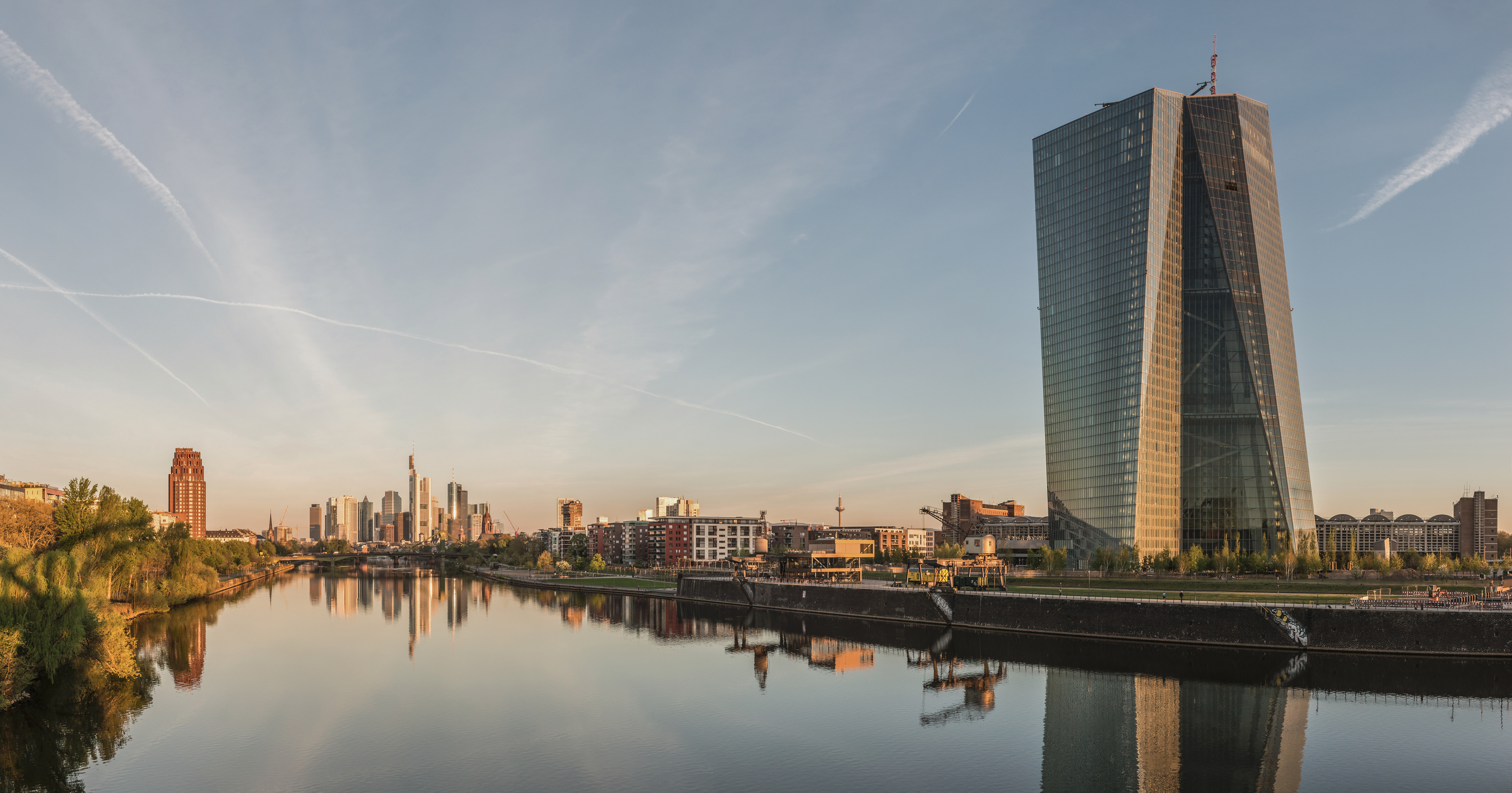
The European Central Bank in Frankfurt am Main, Germany

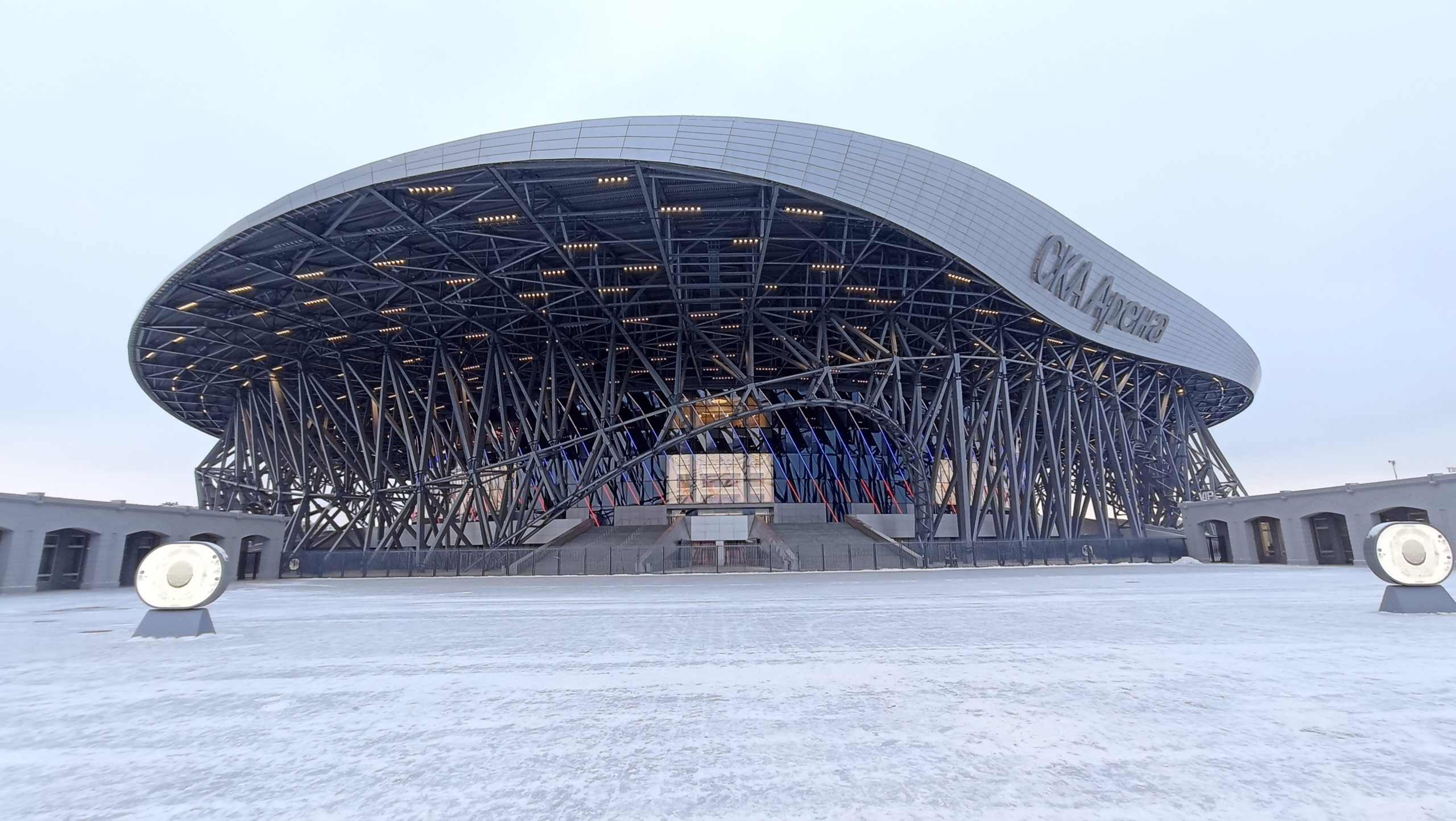
SKA Arena, Saint-Petersburg

- 1966–1970: Villa Rosa, Wien
- 1983–1988: Rooftop Remodeling Falkestrasse, Vienna, Austria
- 1992–2005: Academy of Fine Arts Munich
- 1993–1994: Groninger Museum, Groningen, Netherlands
- 1999–2001: Gasometer, Vienna, Austria
- 2001–2007: BMW Welt ("BMW World"), Munich, Germany
- 2007: Akron Art Museum addition, Akron, Ohio, U.S.A.
- 2002–2008: High School for the Visual and Performing Arts with HMC Architects (Los Angeles Area High School #9, California, USA)
- 2008–2011: Busan Cinema Center, Busan, South Korea
- 2010–2014: Musikkens Hus in Aalborg, Denmark
- 2010–2014: The New European Central Bank in Frankfurt together with Günther Vogt
- 2014: Musée des Confluences, Lyon, France
- 2010–2017: Museum „Paneum“ in Asten, Austria
- 2015–2016: Alban Berg Monument, Vienna, Austria
- 2020–2023: SKA Arena, Russia

== Awards ==
- 2008: RIBA European Award for BMW World
- 2005: American Architecture Awards
  - The Chicago Athenaeum, Illinois
  - Akron Art Museum, Ohio, US (2001–2006)
- 2004: Annie Spink Award for excellence in architectural education, RIBA, London, UK
- 2002: Gold Medal for merits to the federal state of Vienna, Austria
- 1992: Schelling Architecture Prize

== See also ==
- Deconstructivism
