= Rooftop Remodeling Falkestrasse =

Coordinates: 48.2083°N 16.3807°E

The rooftop remodeling Falkestrasse located in Vienna, Austria, is a Coop Himmelb(l)au architectural project. Architizer, About Coop Himmelblau, March 2012 The remodelling is an edition to a pre-existing traditional Viennese building. The law firm clients, Schuppich, Sporn, Winischhofer required more space in which Coop Himmelblau went up and out. The remodelling design commenced in 1983, with the final construction concluding in late 1988.

== The Building ==
The rooftop building extension itself is a parasitic structure, appearing to chaotically distort and violently slice the existing building. The extension consists of a 90 m^{2} conference room beneath the major wing along with additional offices and reception further into the roof space. beneath a "space creating bow". Speaking on the building, "We just interpreted a new corner solution... it was one of the first deconstructivist architecture (sic) in the world" - Wolf D. Prix "The remodelling of this rooftop was especially difficult. because we were not allowed to change the material or slope of the roof. So we showed the model to the mayor of Vienna and asked him whether he thought it was architecture. He said "Looks more like art to me." And we said "Thank you very much", because art is not subject to the rules of the building code" - Wolf D. Prix

== Reception ==
The rooftop extension has been described by architectural theorist Charles Jencks as “a riotous melange of twisted and warped shapes which resembles a dead pterodactyl that has crash-landed on the roof”. The Falkestrasse rooftop extension was included as a part of the Deconstructivist Architecture exhibition held in the MOMA in 1988. In his introduction essay to the deconstructivist exhibition, Mark Wigley describes the project as "The rooftop remodeling project in this exhibition... is clearly a form that has been distorted by some alien organism, a writhing, disruptive animal breaking through the corner. Some twisted counter-relief infects the orthogonal box. It is a skeletal monster which breaks up the elements of the form as it struggles out".

== See also ==
- Deconstruction
- Coop Himmelb(l)au
