= Deconstructivism =

Postmodern architectural movement since the 1980s

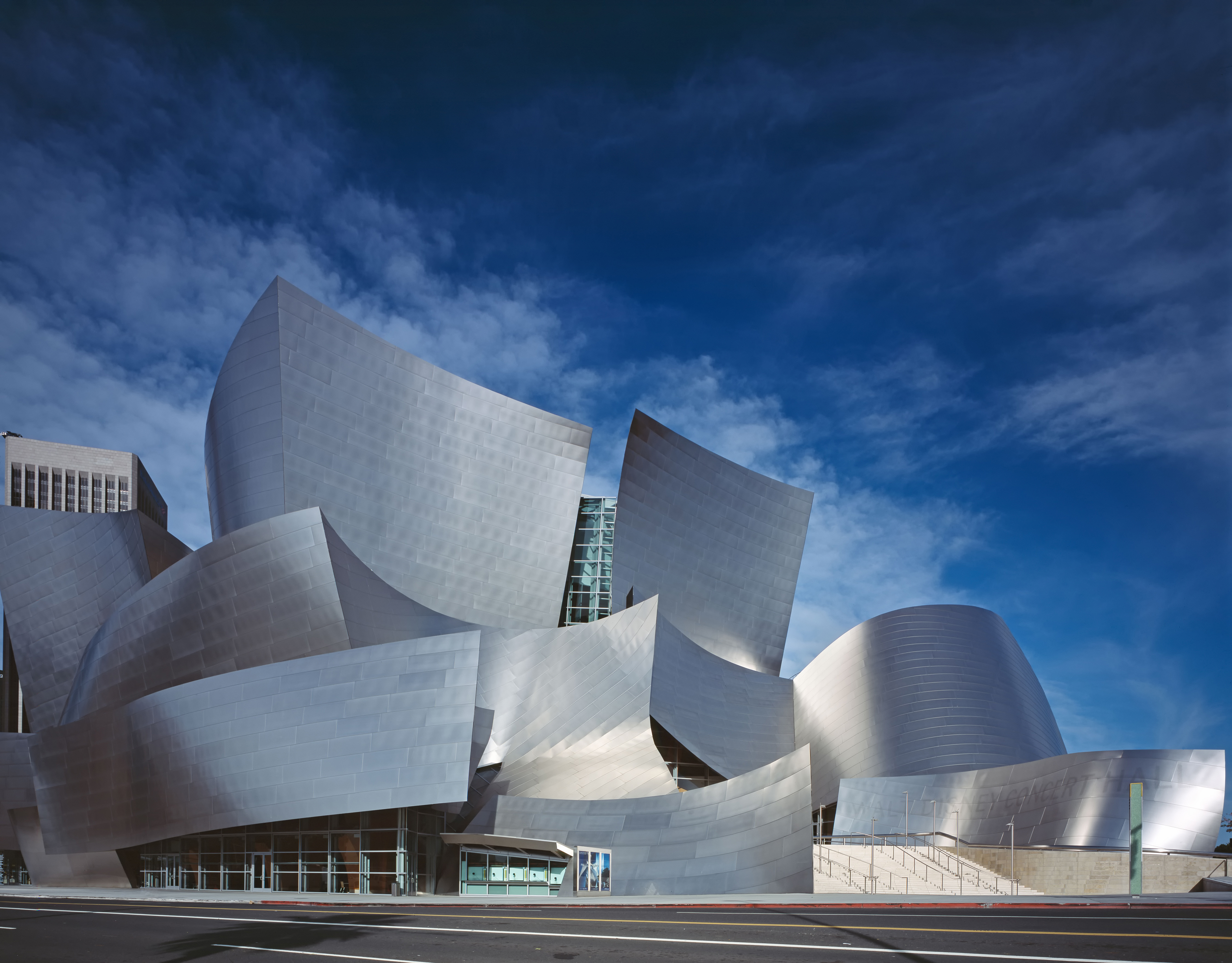
- Walt Disney Concert Hall by Frank Gehry, Los Angeles, California
- Influences: Constructivist architecture Post-structuralist philosophy

Deconstructivism is a postmodern architectural movement which appeared in the 1980s. It gives the impression of the fragmentation of the constructed building, commonly characterised by an absence of obvious harmony, continuity, or symmetry. Its name is a portmanteau of Constructivism and "Deconstruction", a form of semiotic analysis developed by the French philosopher Jacques Derrida. Architects whose work is often described as deconstructivist (though in many cases the architects themselves reject the label) include Zaha Hadid, Peter Eisenman, Frank Gehry, Rem Koolhaas, Daniel Libeskind, Bernard Tschumi, and Coop Himmelb(l)au.

The term does not inherently refer to the style's deconstructed visuals as the English adjective suggests, but instead derives from the movement's foundations in contrast to the Russian Constructivist movement during the First World War that "broke the rules" of classical architecture through the French language.

Besides fragmentation, deconstructivism often manipulates the structure's surface skin and deploys non-rectilinear shapes which appear to distort and dislocate established elements of architecture. The finished visual appearance is characterized by unpredictability and controlled chaos.

== History, context and influences ==
Deconstructivism came to public notice with the 1982 Parc de la Villette architectural design competition, in particular the entry from Jacques Derrida and Peter Eisenman and the winning entry by Bernard Tschumi, as well as the Museum of Modern Art’s 1988 Deconstructivist Architecture exhibition in New York, organized by Philip Johnson and Mark Wigley. Tschumi stated that calling the work of these architects a "movement" or a new "style" was out of context and showed a lack of understanding of their ideas, and believed that Deconstructivism was simply a move against the practice of PoMo, which he said involved "making Doric temple forms out of plywood".

Other influential exhibitions include the 1989 opening of the Wexner Center for the Arts in Columbus, designed by Peter Eisenman. The New York exhibition has featured works by Frank Gehry, Daniel Libeskind, Rem Koolhaas, Peter Eisenman, Zaha Hadid, Coop Himmelb(l)au, and Bernard Tschumi. Since their exhibitions, some architects associated with Deconstructivism have distanced themselves from it; nonetheless, the term has stuck and has come to embrace a general trend within Contemporary architecture.

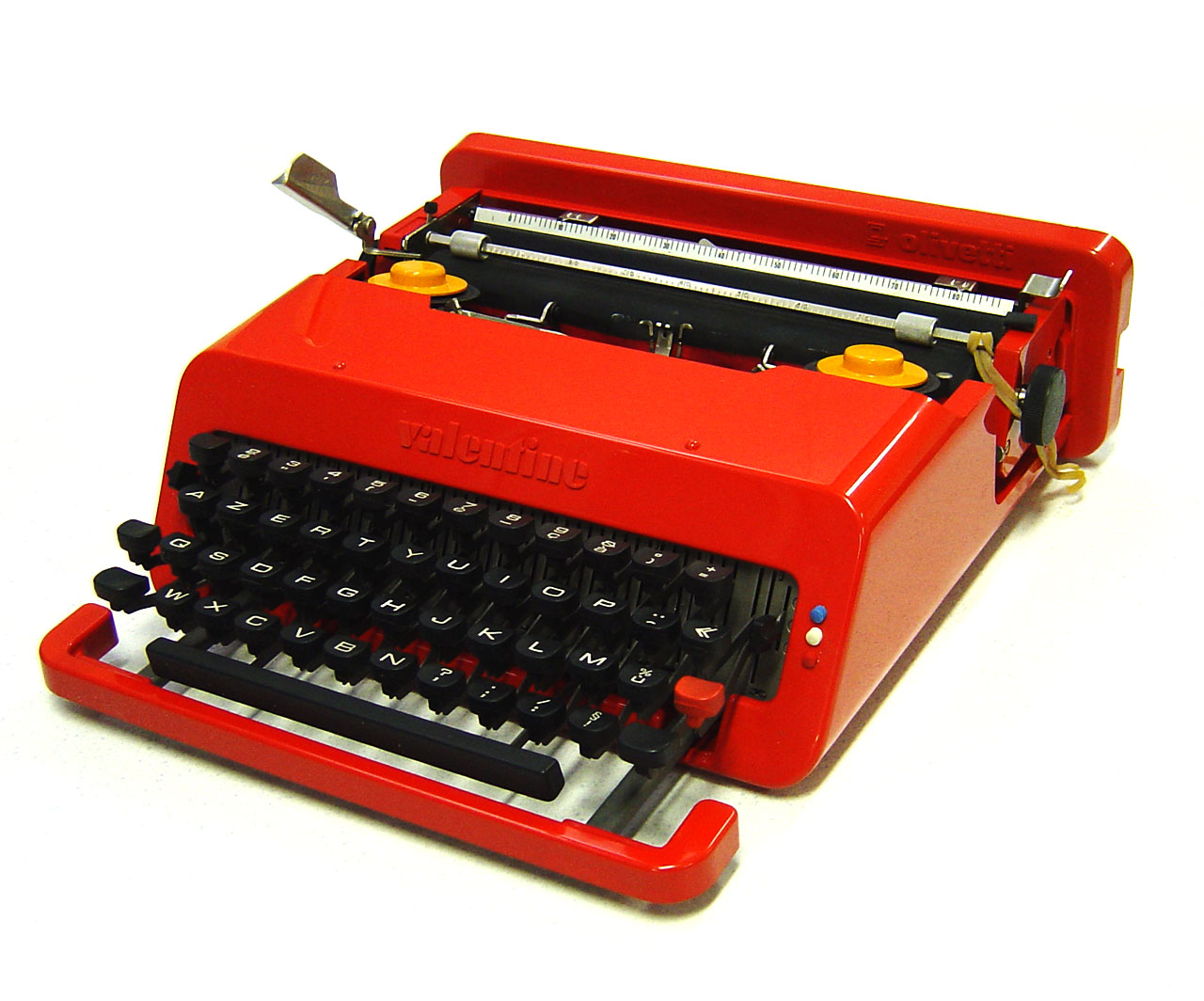
Olivetti Valentine typewriter (1969) by Ettore Sottsass

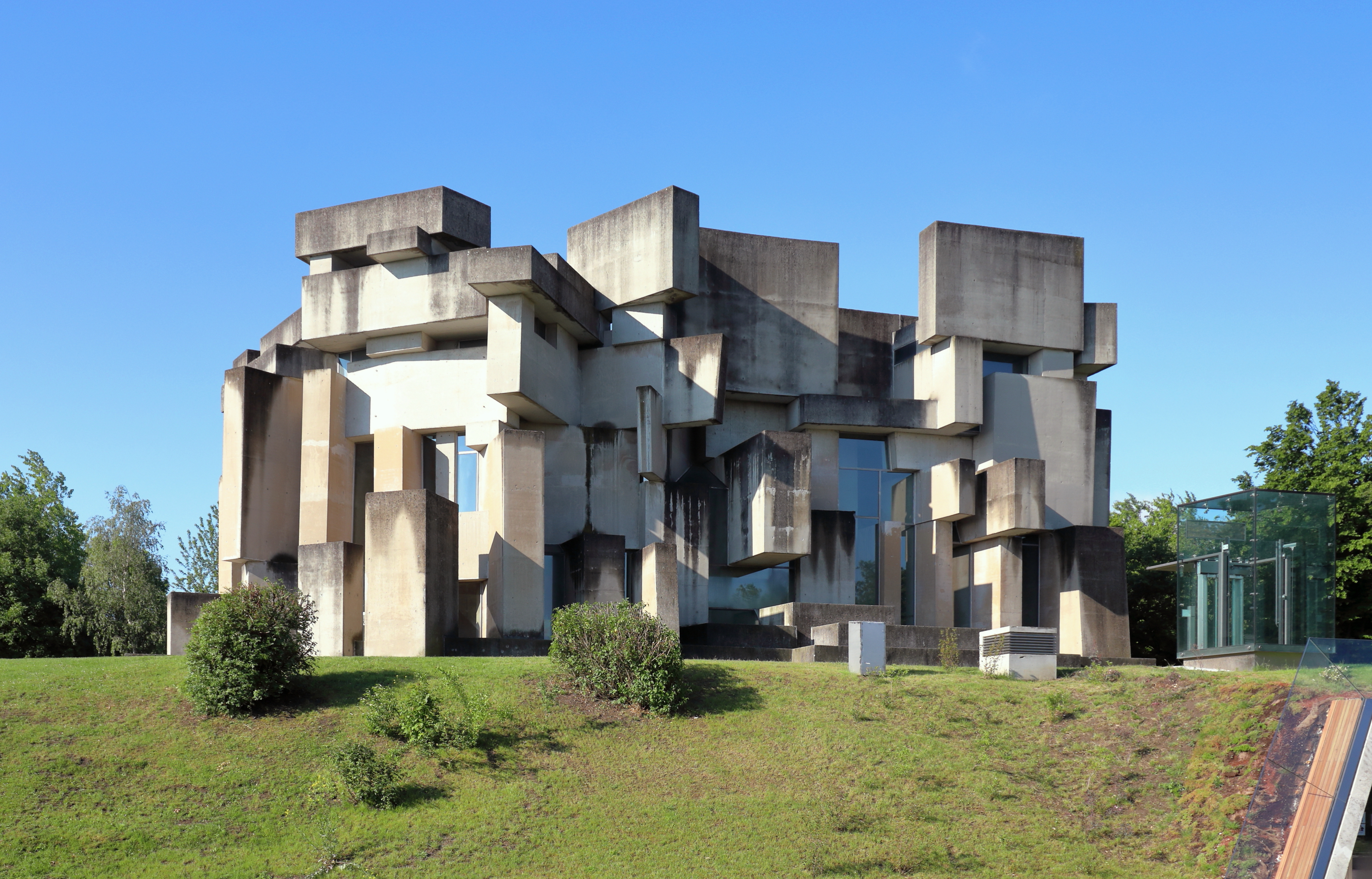
Wotrubakirche in Vienna, built in 1976 is an early example of deconstructivism in the history of architecture.

Early antecedents of the architectural movement could be found in industrial design, notably in Ettore Sottsass' design for the 1969 Olivetti Valentine typewriter, a non-conformist design that deconstructed what was typically the typewriter's bodywork, revealing elements normally concealed, using 'floating keys' and a body-colored plastic 'rail' ahead of the spacebar, visually detached from the typewriter's main body.

=== Modernism and postmodernism ===
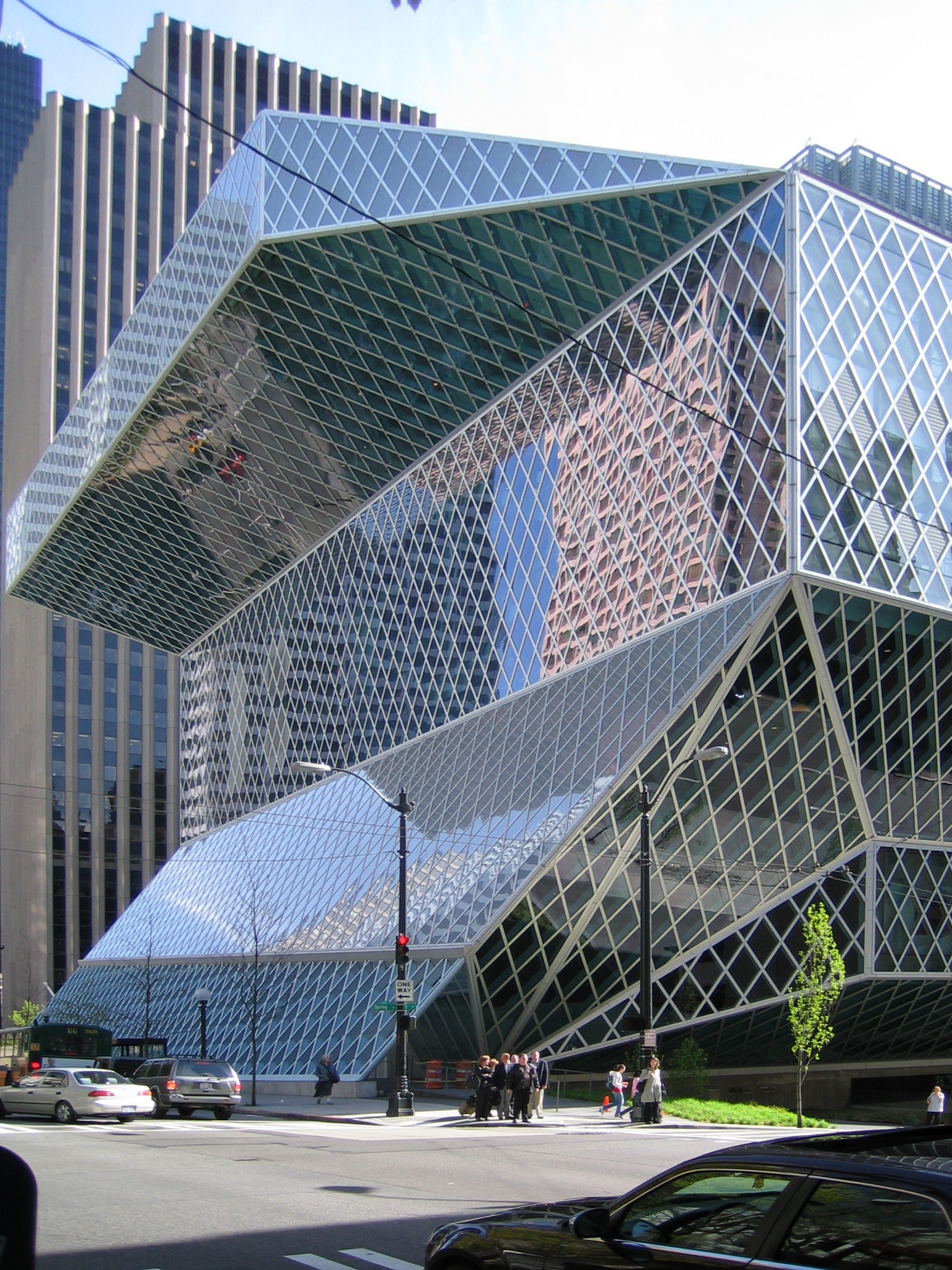
Seattle Central Library by Rem Koolhaas and OMA

The term Deconstructivism in contemporary architecture is opposed to the ordered rationality of Modernism and Postmodernism. Though postmodernist and nascent deconstructivist architects both published in the journal Oppositions (published between 1973 and 1984), that journal's contents mark a decisive break between the two movements. Deconstructivism took a confrontational stance to architectural history, wanting to "disassemble" architecture. While postmodernism returned to embrace the historical references that modernism had shunned, possibly ironically, deconstructivism rejected the postmodern acceptance of such references, as well as the idea of ornament as an after-thought or decoration.

In addition to Oppositions, a defining text for both deconstructivism and postmodernism was Robert Venturi's Complexity and Contradiction in Architecture (1966). It argues against the purity, clarity and simplicity of modernism. With its publication, functionalism and rationalism, the two main branches of modernism, were overturned as paradigms. The reading of the postmodernist Venturi was that ornament and historical allusion added a richness to architecture that modernism had foregone. Some Postmodern architects endeavored to reapply ornament even to economical and minimal buildings, described by Venturi as "the decorated shed". Rationalism of design was dismissed but the functionalism of the building was still somewhat intact. This is close to the thesis of Venturi's next major work, that signs and ornament can be applied to a pragmatic architecture, and instill the philosophic complexities of semiology.

The deconstructivist reading of Complexity and Contradiction is quite different. The basic building was the subject of problematics and intricacies in deconstructivism, with no detachment for ornament. Rather than separating ornament and function, like postmodernists such as Venturi, the functional aspects of buildings were called into question. Geometry was to deconstructivists what ornament was to postmodernists, the subject of complication, and this complication of geometry was in turn, applied to the functional, structural, and spatial aspects of deconstructivist buildings. One example of deconstructivist complexity is Frank Gehry's Vitra Design Museum in Weil-am-Rhein, which takes the typical unadorned white cube of modernist art galleries and deconstructs it, using geometries reminiscent of cubism and abstract expressionism. This subverts the functional aspects of modernist simplicity while taking modernism, particularly the international style, of which its white stucco skin is reminiscent, as a starting point. Another example of the deconstructivist reading of Complexity and Contradiction is Peter Eisenman's Wexner Center for the Arts. The Wexner Center takes the archetypal form of the castle, which it then imbues with complexity in a series of cuts and fragmentations. A three-dimensional grid runs somewhat arbitrarily through the building. The grid, as a reference to modernism, of which it is an accoutrement, collides with the medieval antiquity of a castle. Some of the grid's columns intentionally do not reach the ground, hovering over stairways creating a sense of neurotic unease and contradicting the structural purpose of the column. The Wexner Center deconstructs the archetype of the castle and renders its spaces and structure with conflict and difference.

=== Deconstructivist philosophy ===
Some deconstructivist architects were influenced by the French philosopher Jacques Derrida. Eisenman was a friend of Derrida, but even so his approach to architectural design was developed long before he became a Deconstructivist. For him Deconstructivism should be considered an extension of his interest in radical formalism. Some practitioners of deconstructivism were also influenced by the formal experimentation and geometric imbalances of Russian constructivism. There are additional references in deconstructivism to 20th-century movements: the modernism/postmodernism interplay, expressionism, cubism, minimalism and contemporary art. Deconstructivism attempts to move away from the supposedly constricting 'rules' of modernism such as "form follows function", "purity of form", and "truth to materials".

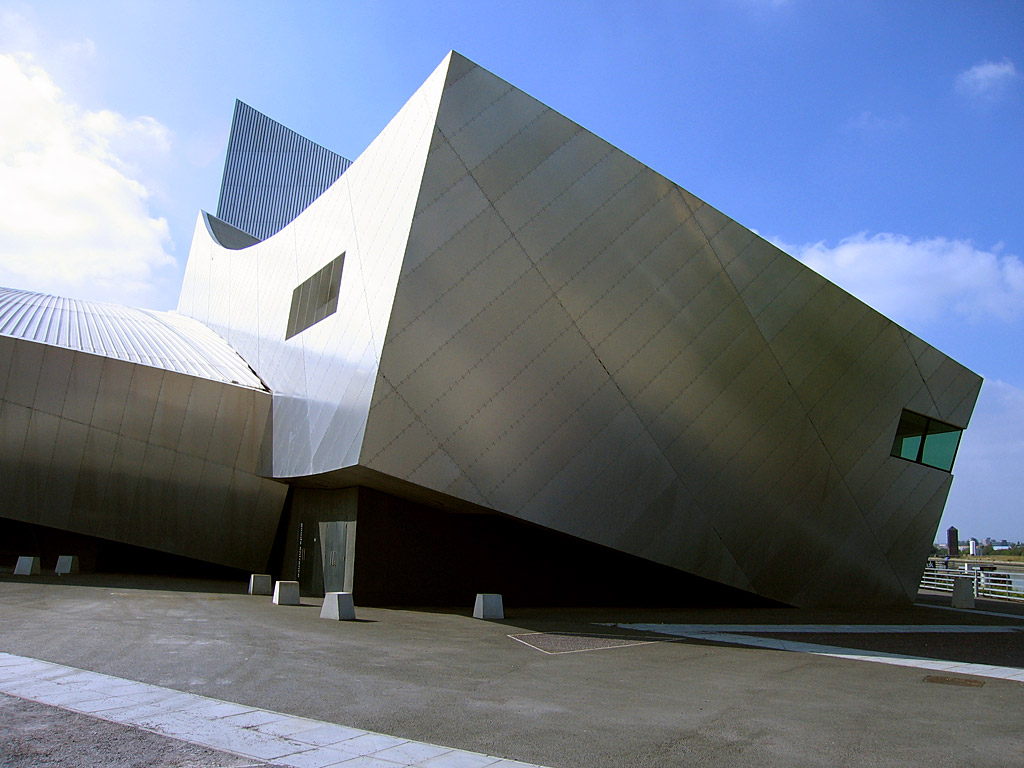
Libeskind's Imperial War Museum North in Trafford, Greater Manchester (2002). An archetype of deconstructivist architecture, it comprises three fragmented, intersecting curved volumes, symbolizing the destruction of war.

The main channel from deconstructivist philosophy to architectural theory was through the philosopher Jacques Derrida's influence with Peter Eisenman. Eisenman drew some philosophical bases from the literary movement Deconstruction, and collaborated directly with Derrida on projects including an entry for the Parc de la Villette competition, documented in Chora l Works. Both Derrida and Eisenman, as well as Daniel Libeskind were concerned with the "metaphysics of presence", and this is the main subject of deconstructivist philosophy in architecture theory. The presupposition is that architecture is a language capable of communicating meaning and of receiving treatments by methods of linguistic philosophy. The dialectic of presence and absence, or solid and void occurs in much of Eisenman's projects, both built and unbuilt. Both Derrida and Eisenman believe that the locus, or place of presence, is architecture, and the same dialectic of presence and absence is found in construction and deconstructivism.

According to Derrida, readings of texts are best carried out when working with classical narrative structures. Any architectural deconstructivism requires the existence of a particular archetypal construction, a strongly-established conventional expectation to play flexibly against. The design of Frank Gehry’s own Santa Monica residence, (from 1978), has been cited as a prototypical deconstructivist building. His starting point was a prototypical suburban house embodied with a typical set of intended social meanings. Gehry altered its massing, spatial envelopes, planes and other expectations in a playful subversion, an act of "de"construction"

In addition to Derrida's concepts of the metaphysics of presence and deconstructivism, his notions of trace and erasure, embodied in his philosophy of writing and arche-writing found their way into deconstructivist memorials. Daniel Libeskind envisioned many of his early projects as a form of writing or discourse on writing and often works with a form of concrete poetry. He made architectural sculptures out of books and often coated the models in texts, openly making his architecture refer to writing. The notions of trace and erasure were taken up by Libeskind in essays and in his project for the Jewish Museum Berlin. The museum is conceived as a trace of the erasure of the Holocaust, intended to make its subject legible and poignant. Memorials such as Maya Lin's Vietnam Veterans Memorial and Peter Eisenman's Memorial to the Murdered Jews of Europe are also said to reflect themes of trace and erasure.

=== Constructivism and Russian Futurism ===
Another major current in deconstructivist architecture takes inspiration from the Constructivist and Russian Futurist movements of the early twentieth century, both in their graphics and in their visionary architecture, little of which was actually constructed.

Artists Naum Gabo, El Lissitzky, Kazimir Malevich, and Alexander Rodchenko, have influenced the graphic sense of geometric forms of deconstructivist architects such as Zaha Hadid and Coop Himmelb(l)au. Both Deconstructivism and Constructivism have been concerned with the tectonics of making an abstract assemblage. Both were concerned with the radical simplicity of geometric forms as the primary artistic content, expressed in graphics, sculpture and architecture. The Constructivist tendency toward purism, though, is absent in Deconstructivism: form is often deformed when construction is deconstructed. Also lessened or absent is the advocacy of socialist and collectivist causes.

The primary graphic motifs of constructivism were the rectangular bar and the triangular wedge, others were the more basic geometries of the square and the circle. In his series Prouns, El Lissitzky assembled collections of geometries at various angles floating free in space. They evoke basic structural units such as bars of steel or sawn lumber loosely attached, piled, or scattered. They were also often drafted and share aspects with technical drawing and engineering drawing. Similar in composition is the deconstructivist series Micromegas by Daniel Libeskind.

The symbolic breakdown of the wall effected by introducing the Constructivist motifs of tilted and crossed bars sets up a subversion of the walls that define the bar itself. ... This apparent chaos actually constructs the walls that define the bar; it is the structure. The internal disorder produces the bar while splitting it even as gashes open up along its length.

— Phillip Johnson and Mark Wigley, Deconstructive Architecture, p. 34

=== Contemporary art ===
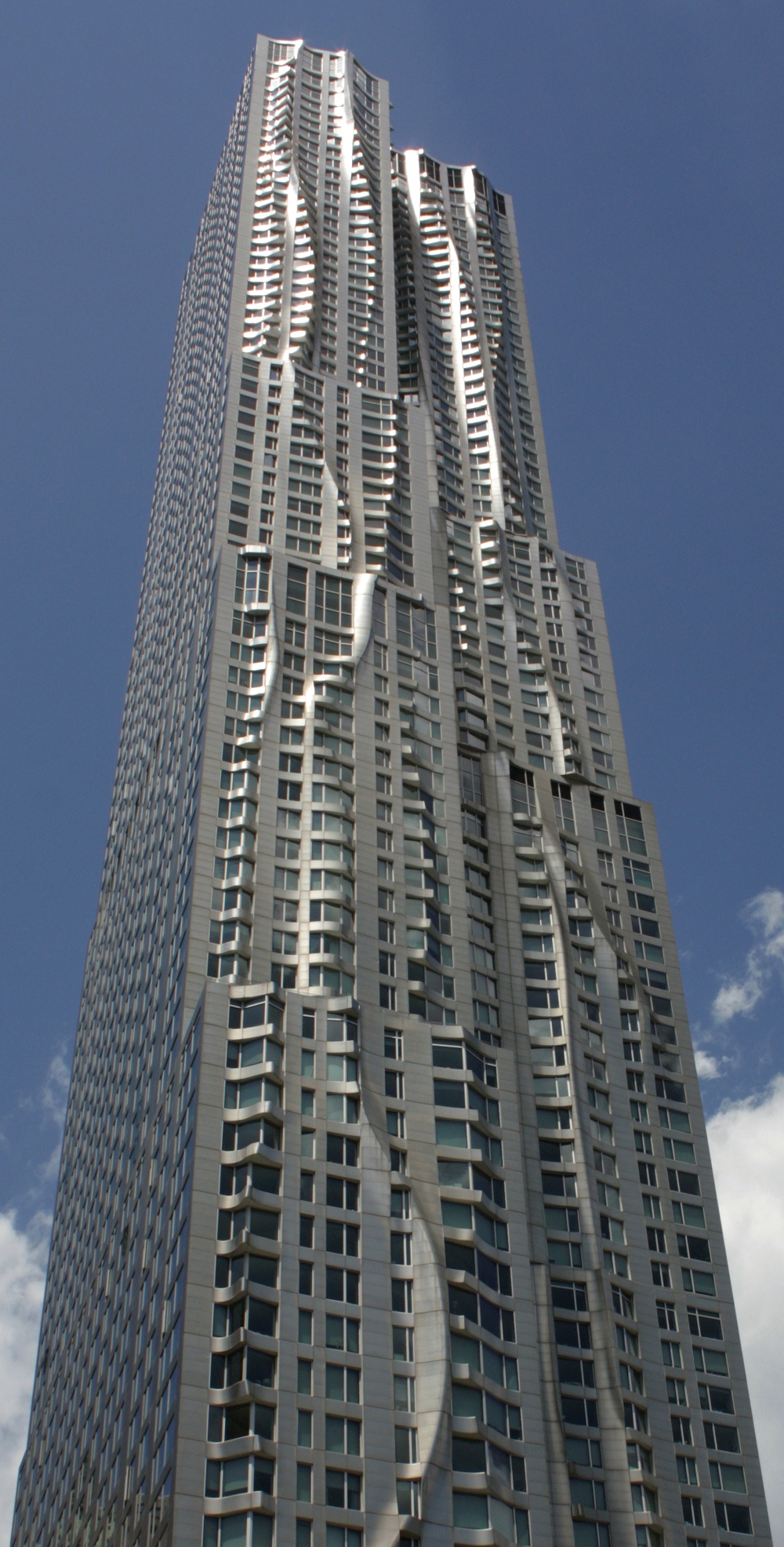
8 Spruce Street in Manhattan with rippling stainless steel on three of its elevations including the east elevation facing Brooklyn but a more typical flat surface on its south elevation facing Wall Street and the financial district

Two strains of modern art, minimalism and cubism, have had an influence on deconstructivism. Analytical cubism had a sure effect on deconstructivism, as forms and content are dissected and viewed from different perspectives simultaneously. A synchronicity of disjoined space is evident in many of the works of Frank Gehry and Bernard Tschumi. Synthetic cubism, with its application of found object art, is not as great an influence on deconstructivism as Analytical cubism, but is still found in the earlier and more vernacular works of Frank Gehry. Deconstructivism also shares with minimalism a disconnection from cultural references.

With its tendency toward deformation and dislocation, there is also an aspect of expressionism and expressionist architecture associated with deconstructivism. At times deconstructivism mirrors varieties of expressionism, neo-expressionism, and abstract expressionism as well. The angular forms of the Ufa Cinema Center by Coop Himmelb(l)au recall the abstract geometries of the numbered paintings of Franz Kline, in their unadorned masses. The UFA Cinema Center also would make a likely setting for the angular figures depicted in urban German street scenes by Ernst Ludwig Kirchner. The work of Wassily Kandinsky also bears similarities to deconstructivist architecture. His movement into abstract expressionism and away from figurative work, is in the same spirit as the deconstructivist rejection of ornament for geometries.

Several artists in the 1980s and 1990s contributed work that influenced or took part in deconstructivism. Maya Lin and Rachel Whiteread are two examples. Lin's 1982 project for the Vietnam Veterans Memorial, with its granite slabs severing the ground plane, is one. Its shard-like form and reduction of content to a minimalist text influenced deconstructivism, with its sense of fragmentation and emphasis on reading the monument. Lin also contributed work for Eisenman's Wexner Center. Rachel Whiteread's cast architectural spaces are another instance where contemporary art is confluent with architecture. Ghost (1990), an entire living space cast in plaster, solidifying the void, alludes to Derrida's notion of architectural presence. Gordon Matta-Clark's Building cuts were deconstructed sections of buildings exhibited in art galleries.

=== 1988 MoMA exhibition ===
Mark Wigley and Philip Johnson curated the 1988 Museum of Modern Art exhibition Deconstructivist architecture, which crystallized the movement, and brought fame and notoriety to its key practitioners. The architects presented at the exhibition were Peter Eisenman, Frank Gehry, Zaha Hadid, Coop Himmelblau, Rem Koolhaas, Daniel Libeskind, and Bernard Tschumi. Mark Wigley wrote the accompanying essay and tried to show a common thread among the various architects whose work was usually more noted for their differences.

The projects in this exhibition mark a different sensibility, one in which the dream of pure form has been disturbed.

It is the ability to disturb our thinking about form that makes these projects deconstructive.

The show examines an episode, a point of intersection between several architects where each constructs an unsettling building by exploiting the hidden potential of modernism.

— Phillip Johnson and Mark Wigley, excerpt from the MoMA Deconstructivist Architecture catalog

=== Computer-aided design ===
Computer-aided design is now an essential tool in most aspects of contemporary architecture, but the particular nature of deconstructivism makes the use of computers especially pertinent. Three-dimensional modelling and animation (virtual and physical) assists in the conception of very complicated spaces, while the ability to link computer models to manufacturing jigs (CAM—computer-aided manufacturing) allows the mass production of subtly different modular elements to be achieved at affordable costs. Also, Gehry is noted for producing many physical models as well as computer models as part of his design process. Though the computer has made the designing of complex shapes much easier, not everything that looks odd is "deconstructivist".

=== Critical theory ===
Since the publication of Kenneth Frampton's Modern Architecture: A Critical History (first edition 1980) there has been awareness of the role of criticism within architectural theory. Whilst referencing Derrida as a philosophical influence, deconstructivism can also be seen as having as much a basis in critical theory as the other major offshoot of postmodernism, critical regionalism. The two aspects of critical theory, urgency and analysis, are found in deconstructivism. There is a tendency to re-examine and critique other works or precedents in deconstructivism, and also a tendency to set aesthetic issues in the foreground.

The difference between criticality in deconstructivism and criticality in critical regionalism is that critical regionalism reduces the overall level of complexity involved and maintains a clearer analysis while attempting to reconcile modernist architecture with local differences. In effect, this leads to a modernist "vernacular". Critical regionalism displays a lack of self-criticism and a utopianism of place. Deconstructivism, meanwhile, maintains a level of self-criticism and a dystopianism of place, as well as external criticism and tends towards maintaining a level of complexity. Some architects identified with the movement, notably Frank Gehry, have actively rejected the classification of their work as deconstructivist.

== Gallery ==
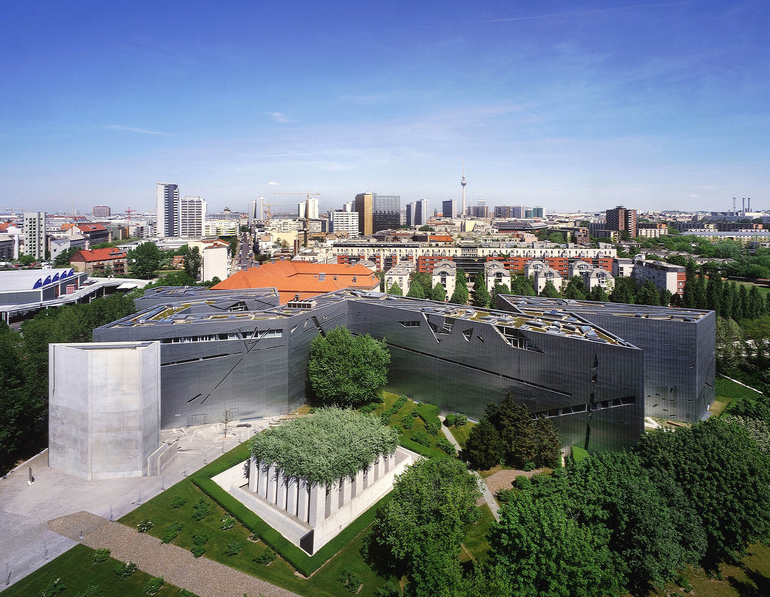
Jewish Museum, Berlin, Germany

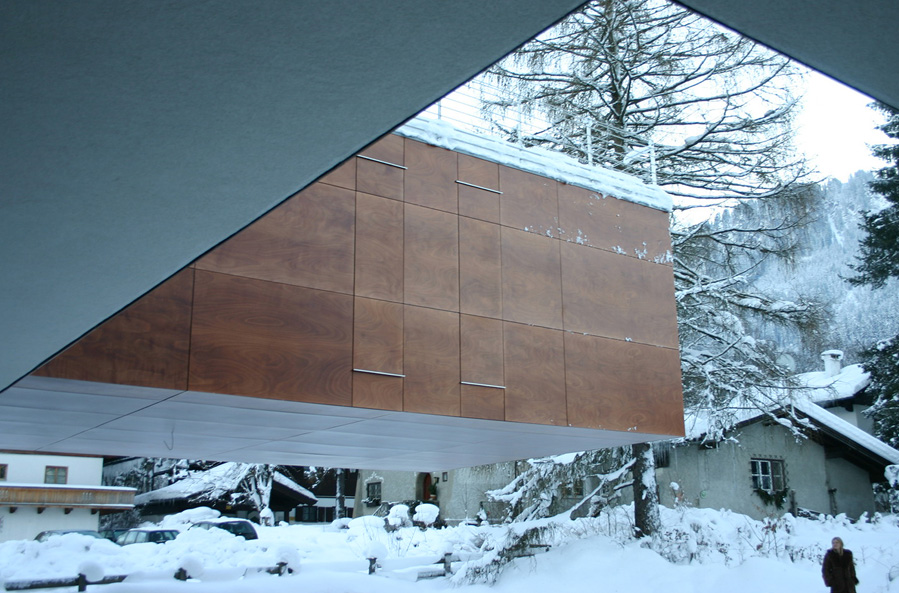
Alpine Deconstructivism in Kitzbühel, Austria, by Christine & Horst Lechner

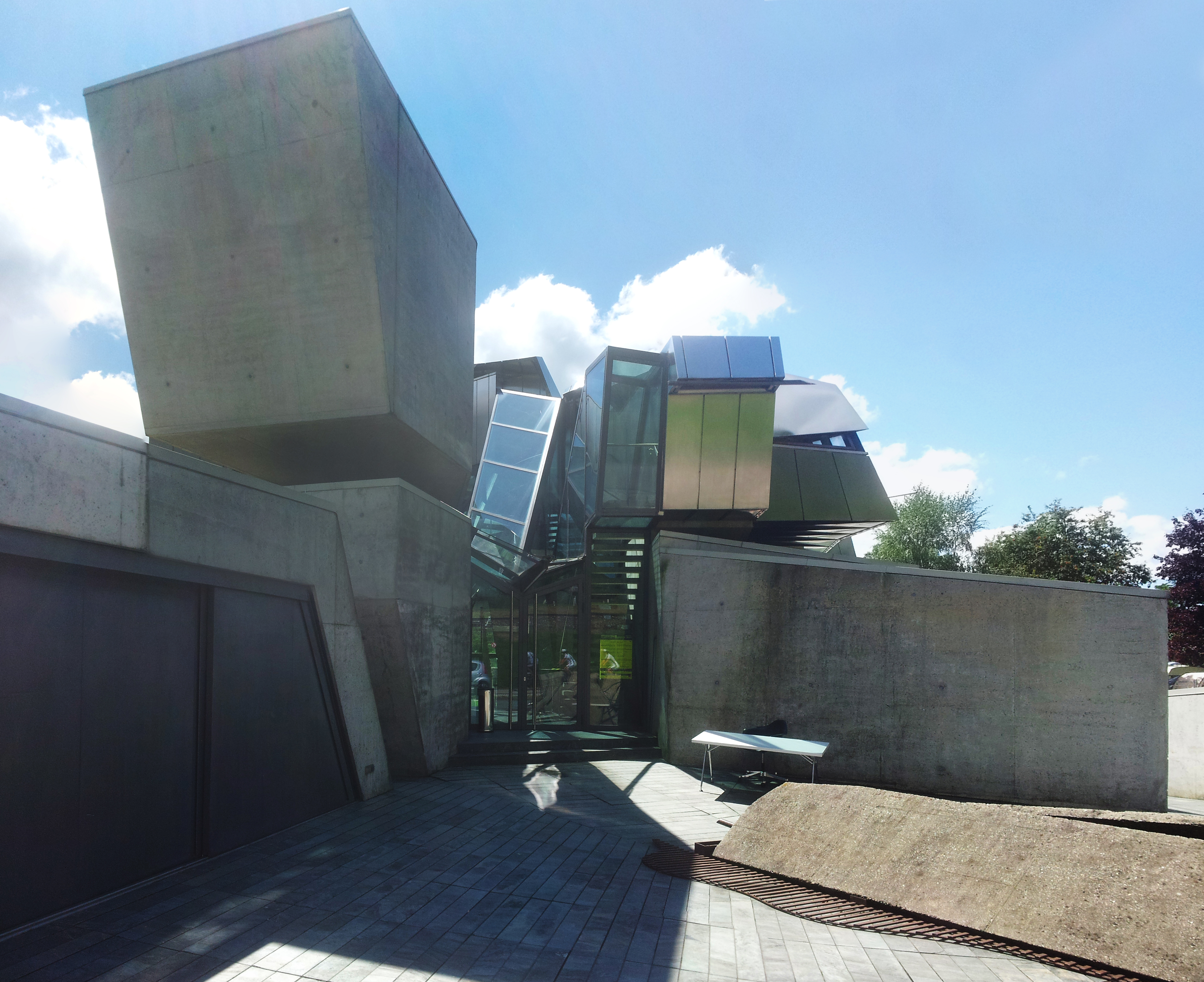
Günter Domenig' s "Steinhaus" at Lake Ossiach, Austria

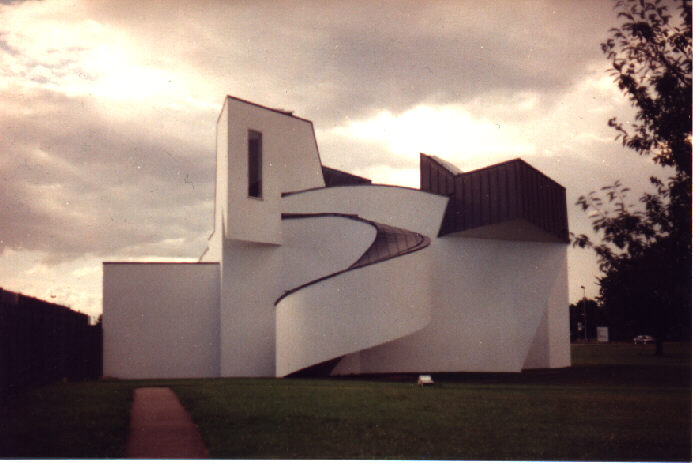
Vitra Design Museum by Frank Gehry, Weil am Rhein, Germany

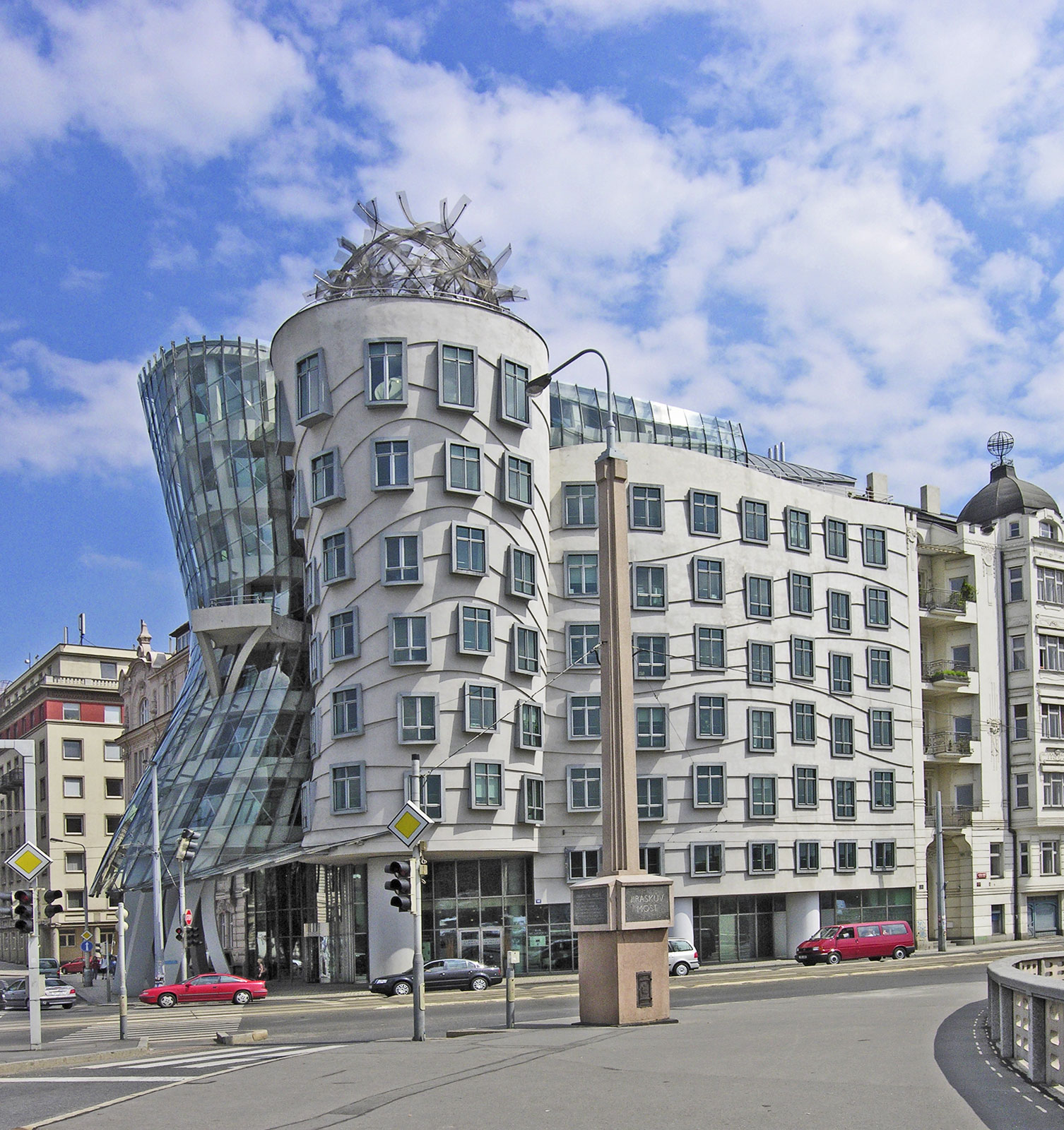
Dancing House by Vlado Milunić and Frank Gehry, Prague, Czech Republic

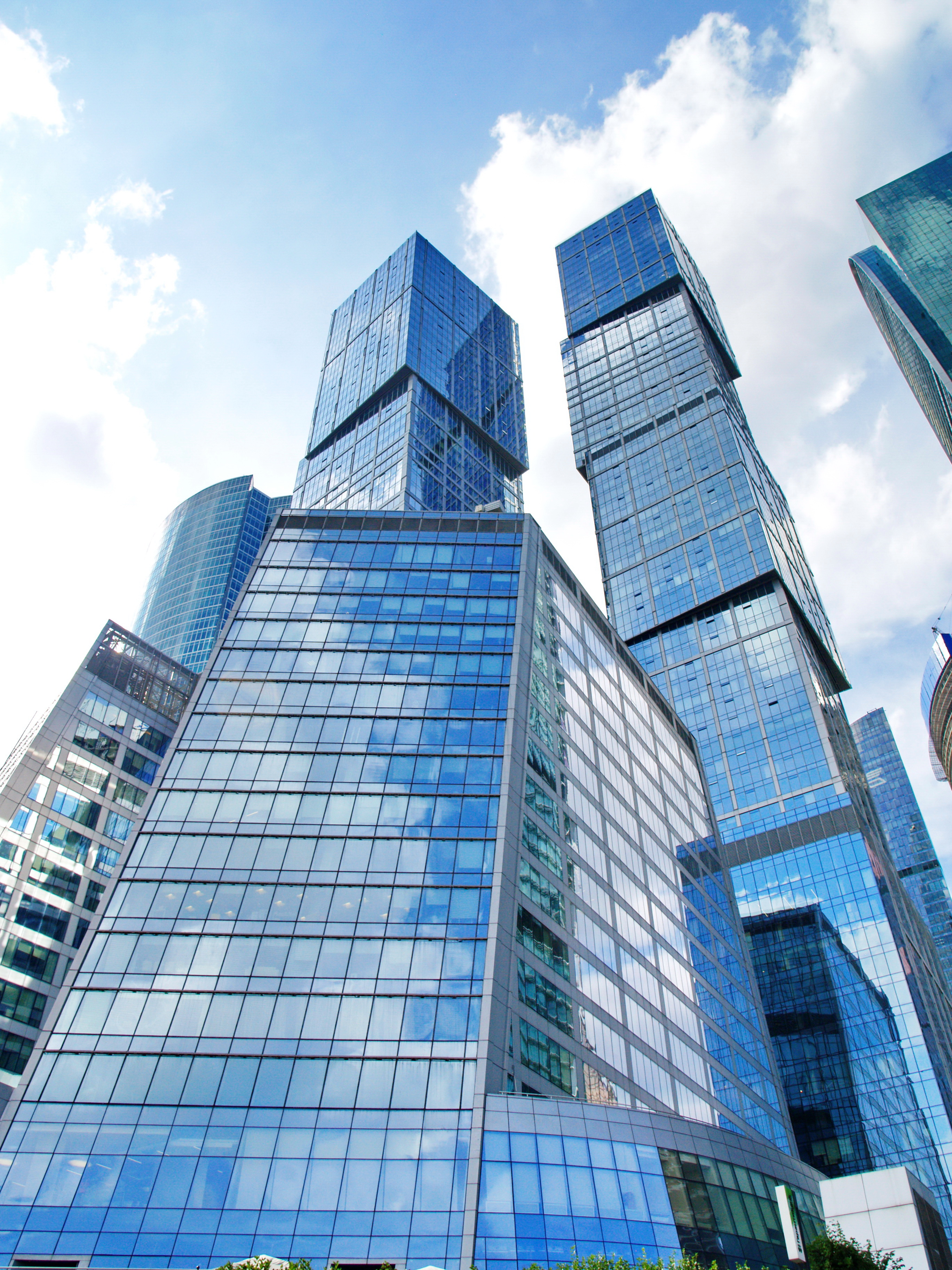
City of Capitals in Moscow IBC, Russia

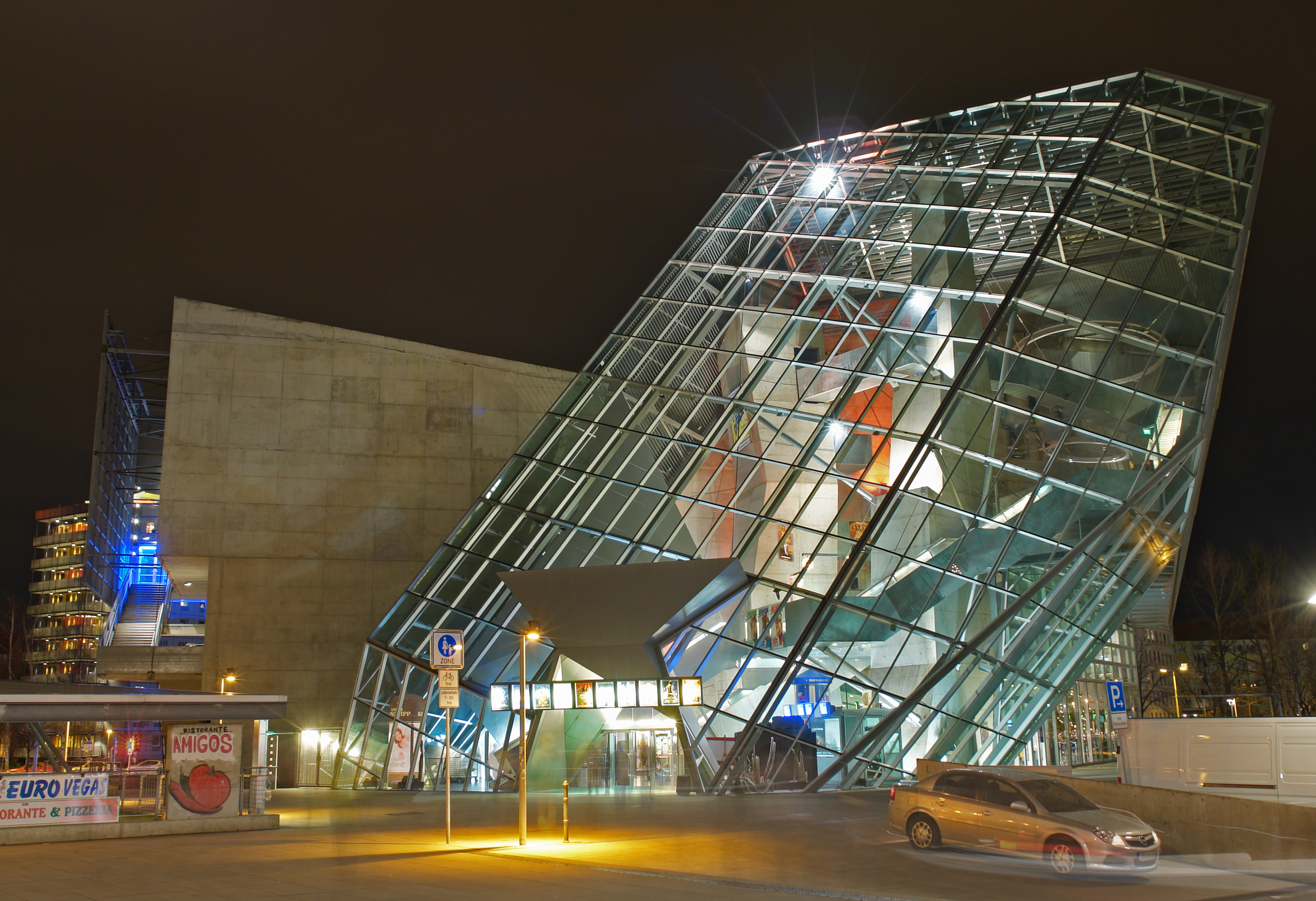
UFA-Palast in Dresden, Dresden, Germany, by Coop Himmelb(l)au

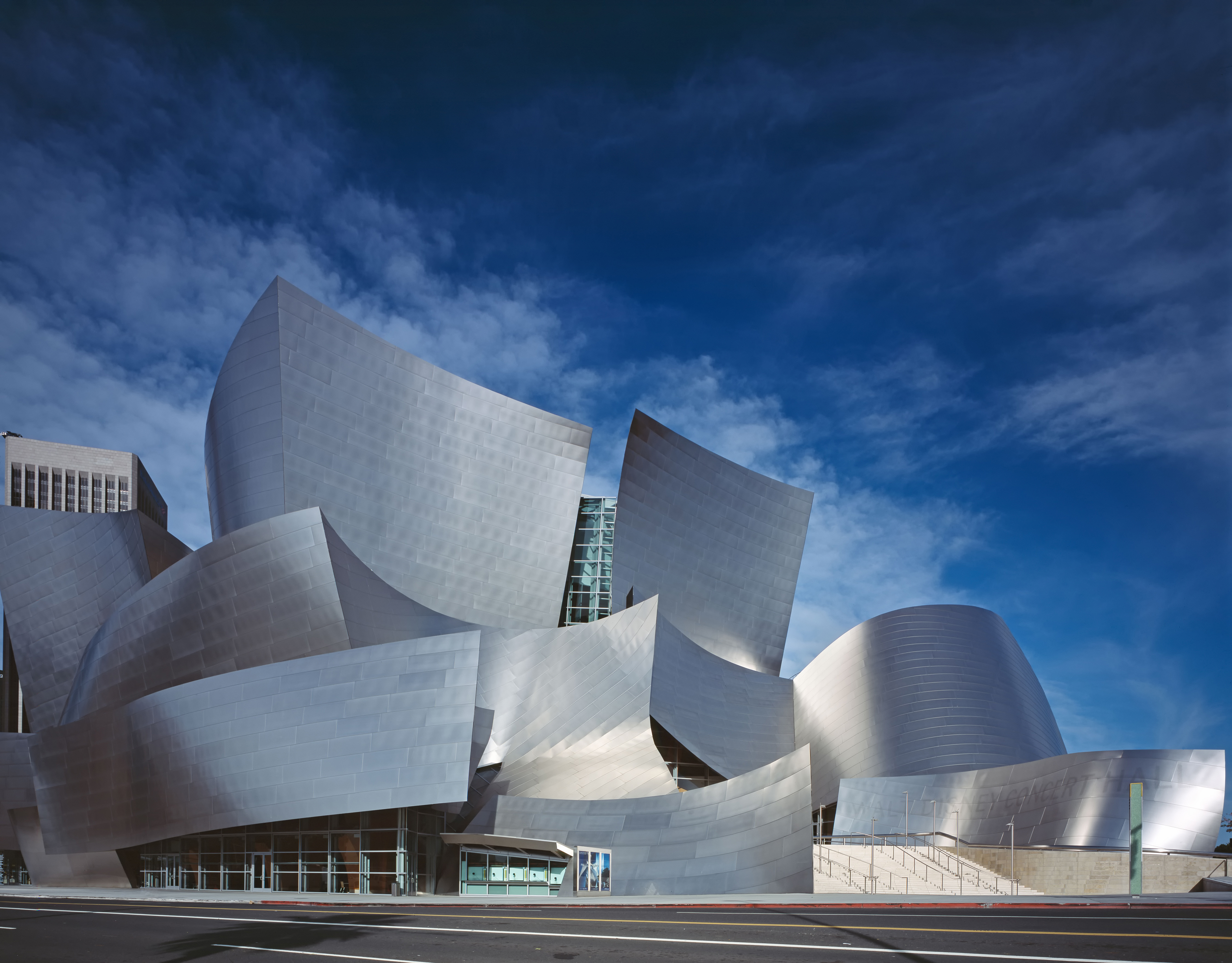
Walt Disney Concert Hall by Frank Gehry, Los Angeles, California

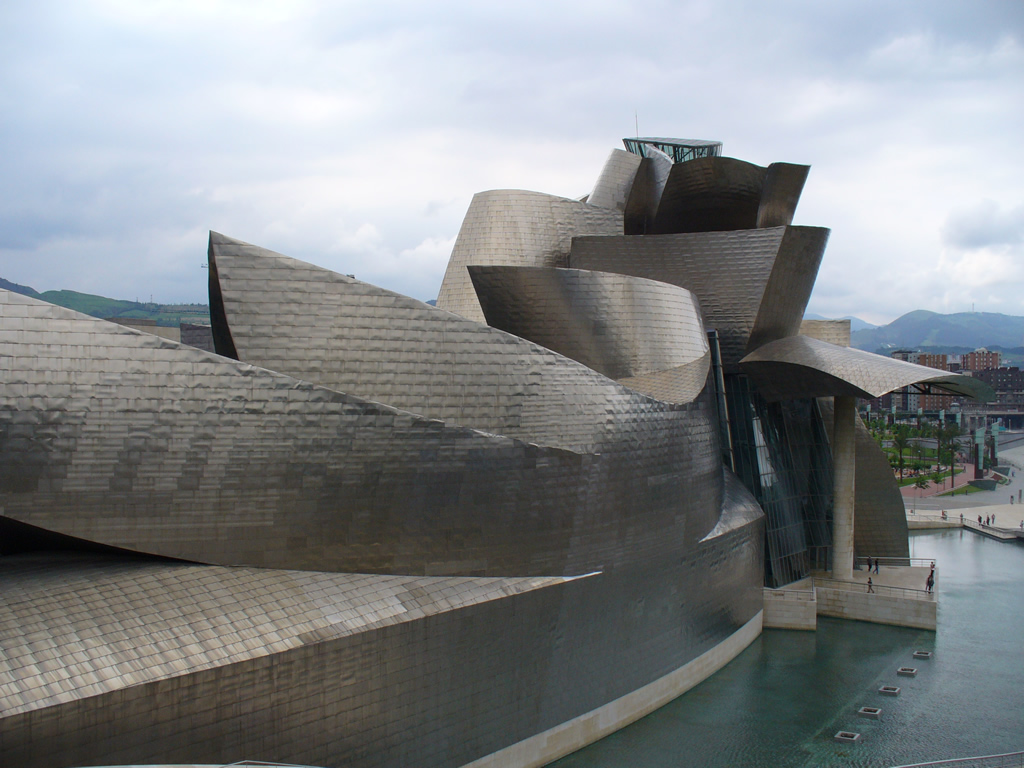
The Guggenheim Museum Bilbao by Frank Gehry, in Bilbao, Spain

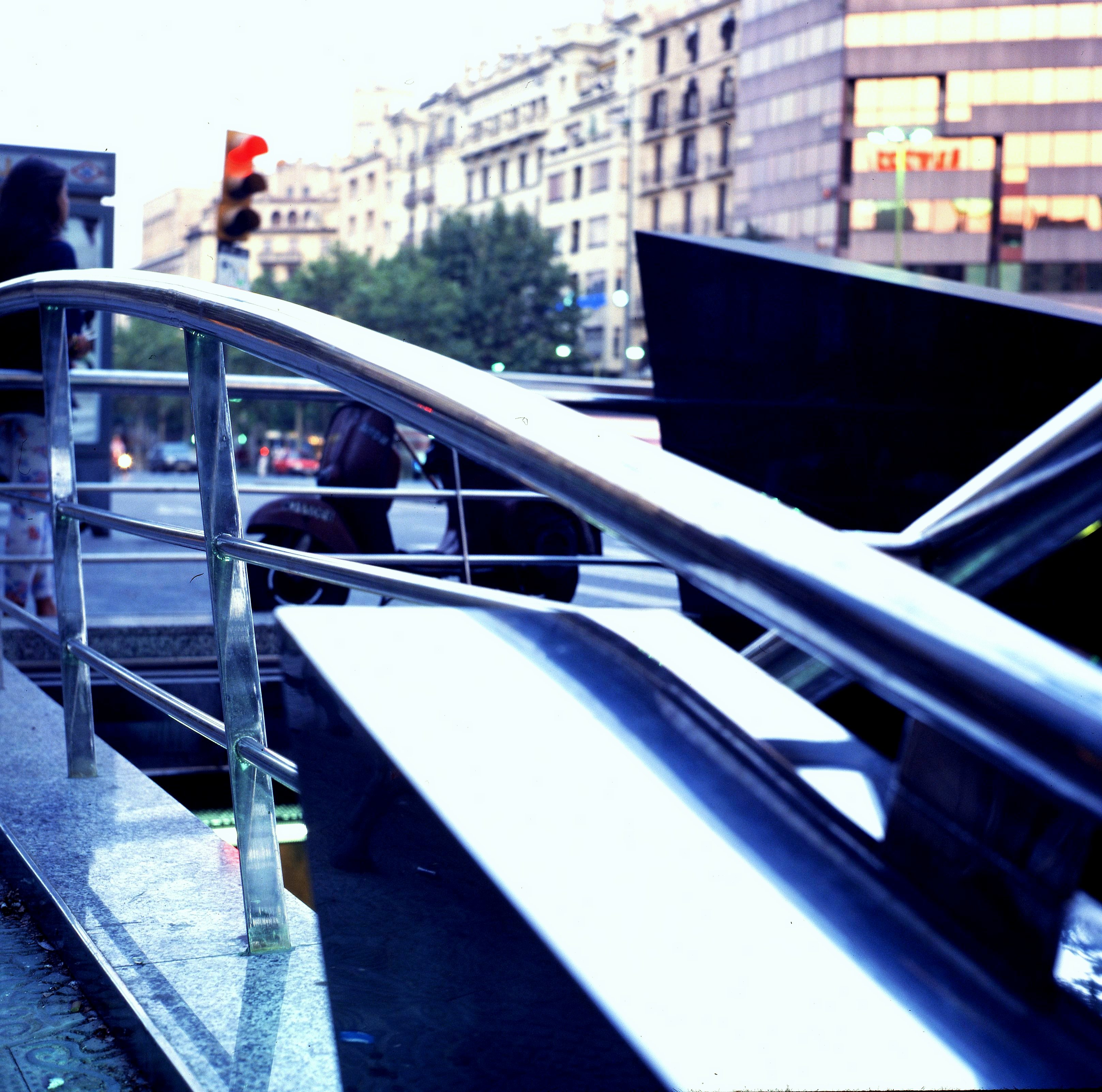
Paseo de Gracia Station, Barcelona (1991) by Daniel Navas, Neus Solé. Arch.

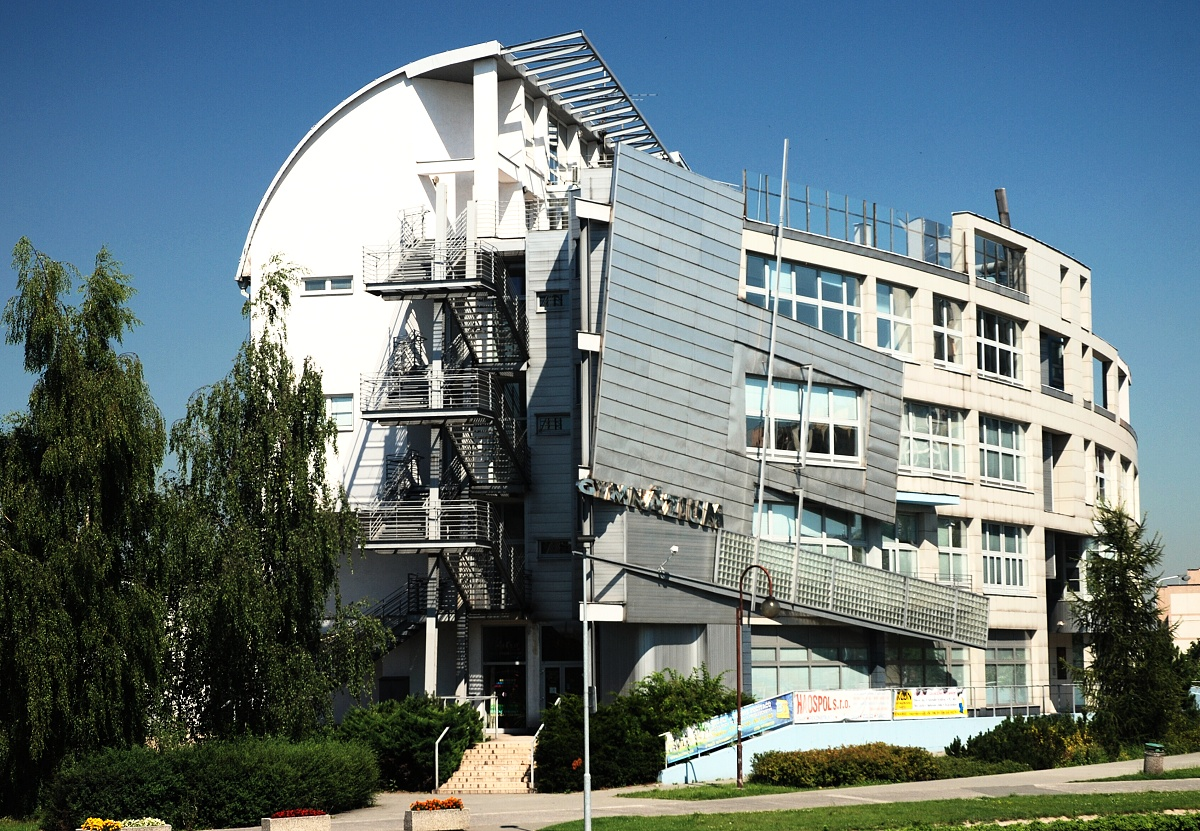
The Gymnasium by Josef Kiszka and Barbara Potysz, in Orlová, Czech Republic

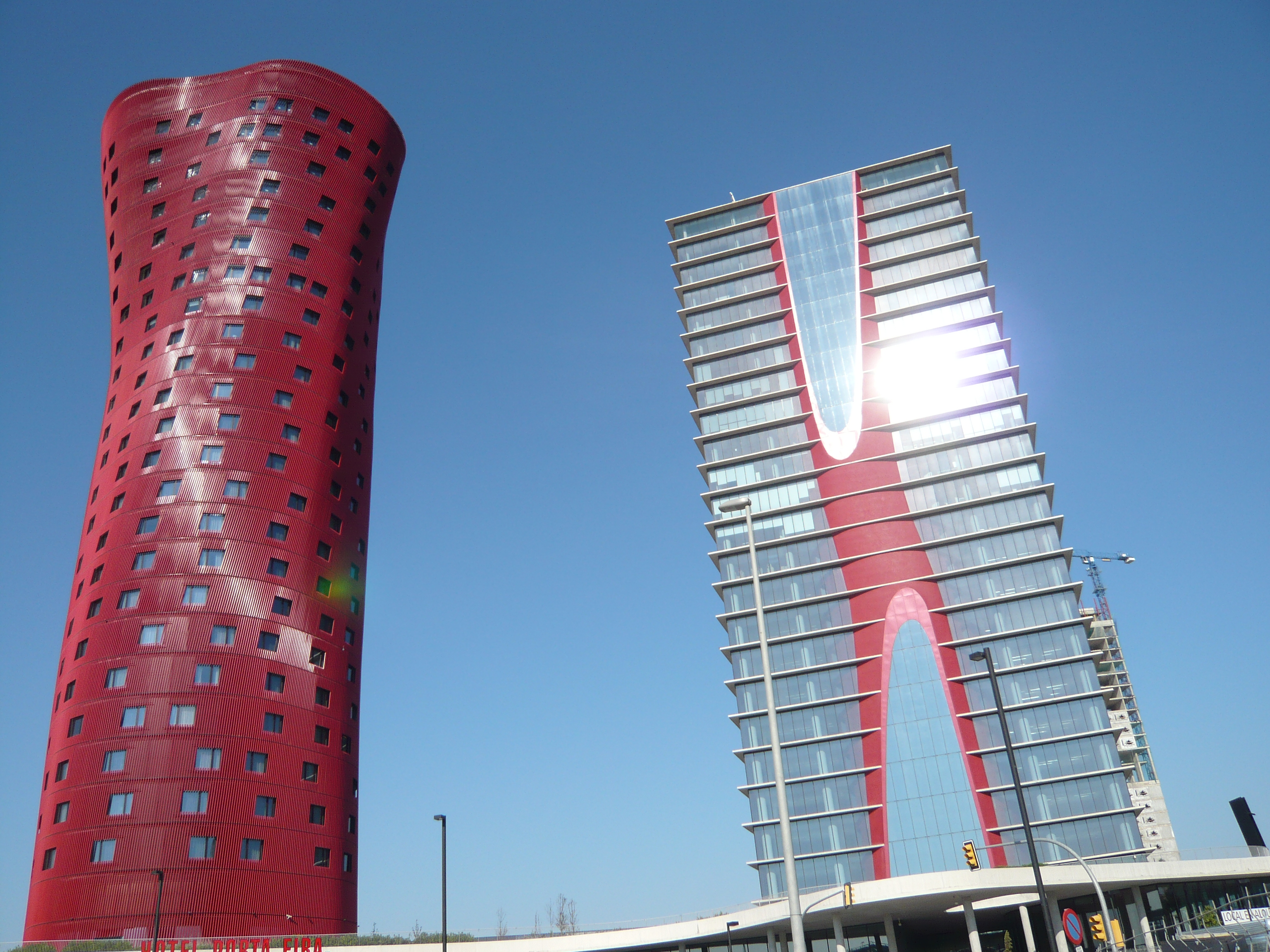
Hotel Porta Fira (left) in Barcelona, Spain, by Toyo Ito

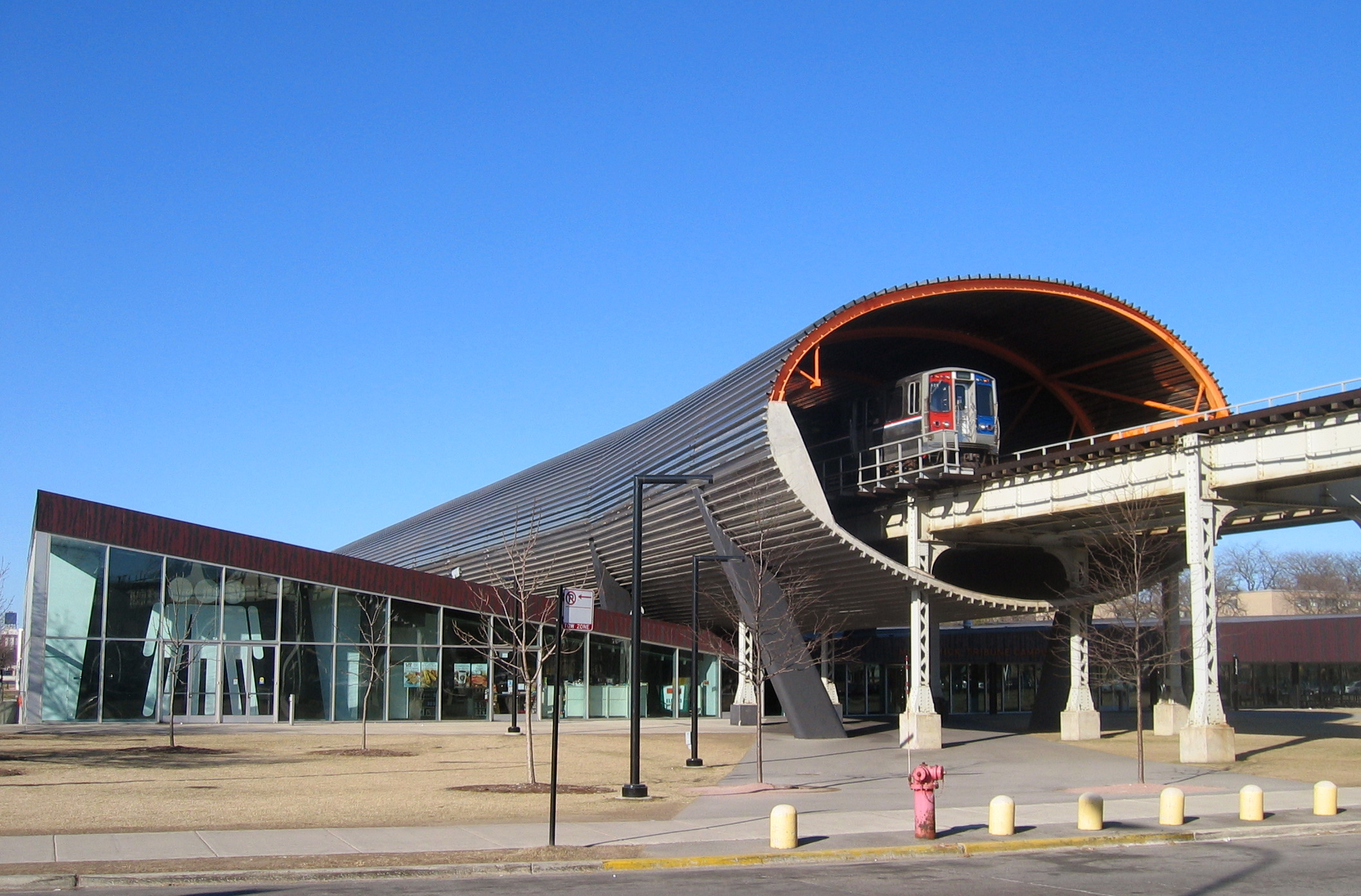
The McCormick Tribune Campus Center at Chicago's IIT Campus by Rem Koolhaas

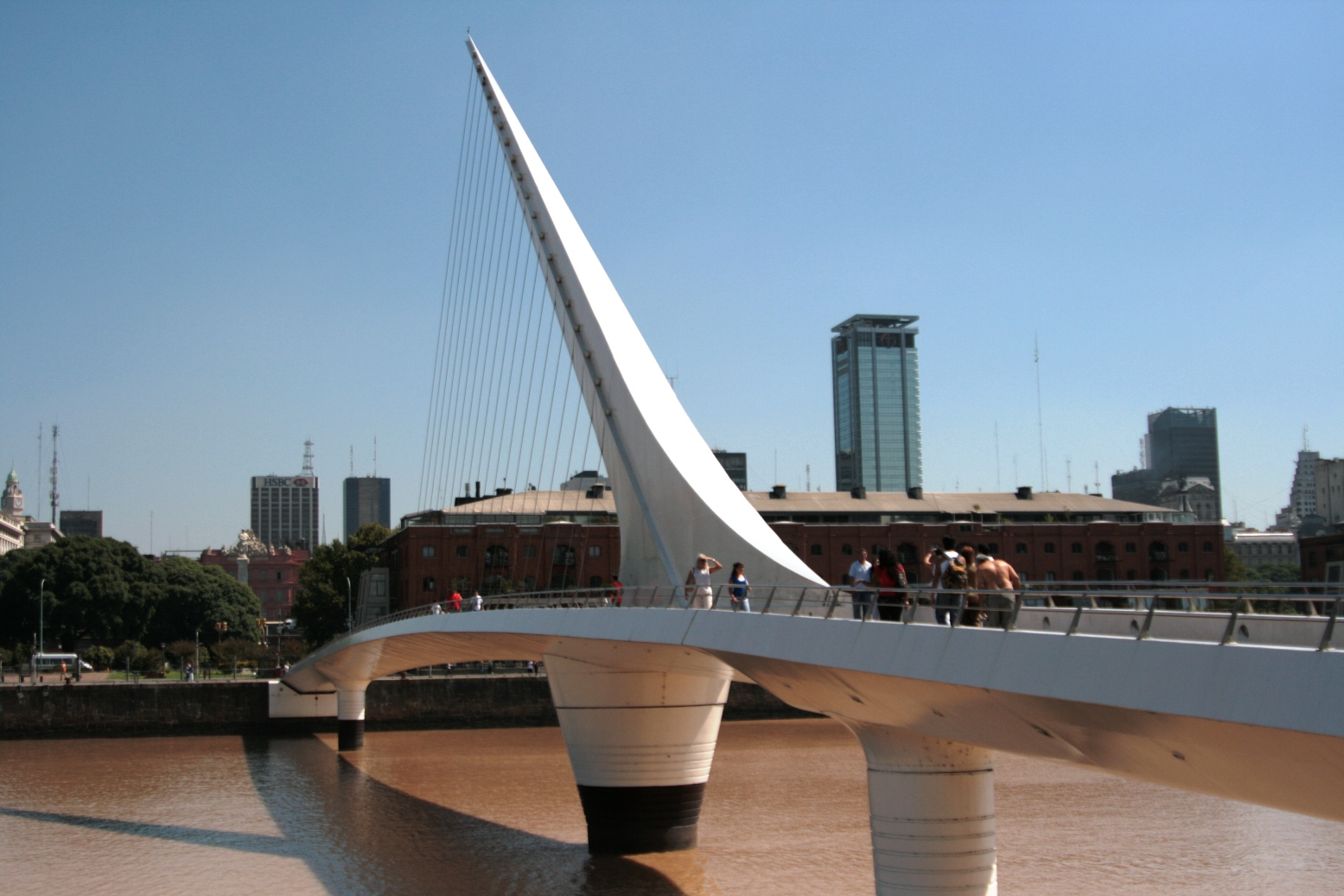
Puente de la Mujer, Argentina by Santiago Calatrava

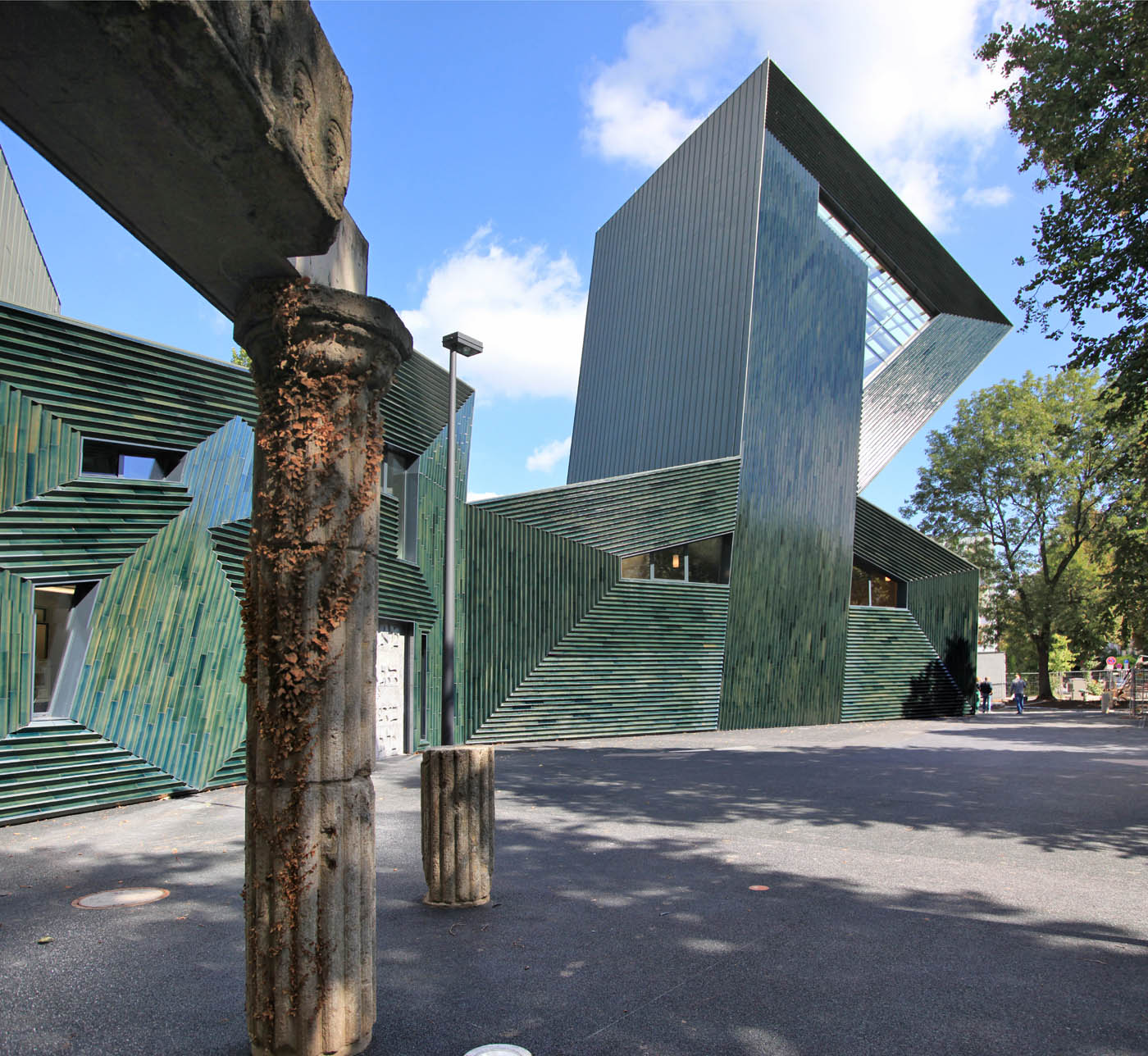
New synagogue in Mainz by Manuel Herz

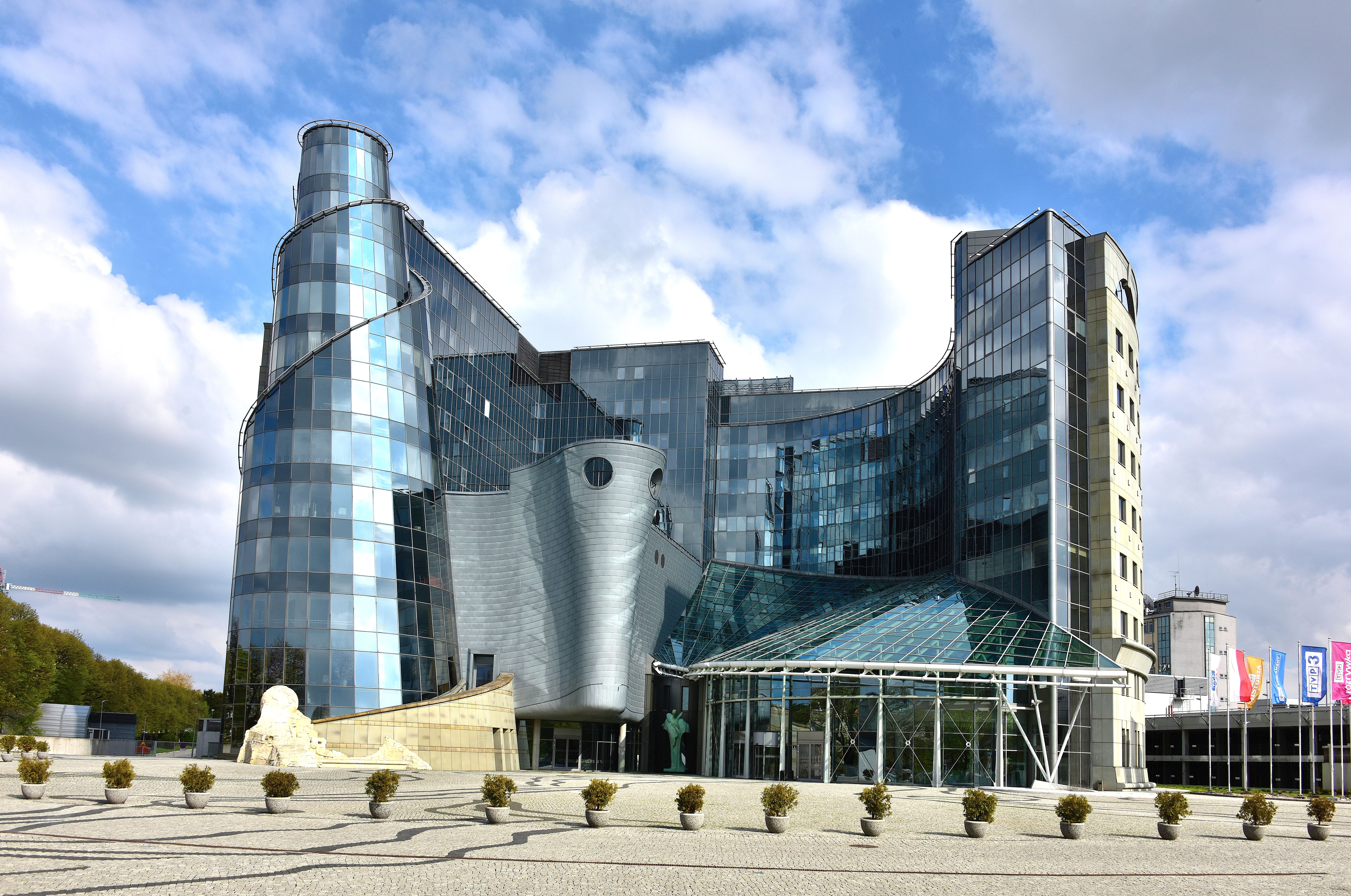
Telewizja Polska headquarters

== Criticism ==
Kenneth Frampton finds deconstructivism "elitist and detached". Nikos Salingaros calls deconstructivism a "viral expression" that invades design thinking in order to build destroyed forms; while curiously similar to both Derrida's and Philip Johnson's descriptions, this is meant as a harsh condemnation of the entire movement. Other criticisms are similar to those of deconstructivist philosophy—that since the act of deconstructivism is not an empirical process, it can result in whatever an architect wishes, and it thus suffers from a lack of consistency. Today there is a sense that the philosophical underpinnings of the beginning of the movement have been lost, and all that is left is the aesthetic of deconstructivism. Other criticisms reject the premise that architecture is a language capable of being the subject of linguistic philosophy, or, if it was a language in the past, critics claim it is no longer. Others question the wisdom and impact on future generations of an architecture that rejects the past and presents no clear values as replacements and which often pursues strategies that are intentionally aggressive to human senses.

== See also ==
- Günter Behnisch
- Constructivism (art)
- Deconstruction (fashion)
- Futurism (art)
- Khôra
- Thom Mayne
- Novelty architecture
- Reconstruction (architecture)
- Rooftop Remodeling Falkestrasse
- Structuralism (architecture)
- Vorticism

== General and cited references ==
- Bony, Anne (2012). L'Architecture Moderne (in French). Larousse. ISBN 978-2-03-587641-6.
- Derrida, Jacques (1967). Of Grammatology, (hardcover: ISBN 0-8018-1841-9, paperback: ISBN 0-8018-1879-6, corrected edition: ISBN 0-8018-5830-5) trans. Gayatri Chakravorty Spivak. Johns Hopkins University Press.
- Derrida, Jacques & Eisenman, Peter (1997). Chora l Works. Monacelli Press. ISBN 1-885254-40-7.
- Derrida, Jacques & Husserl, Edmund (1989). Edmund Husserl's Origin of Geometry: An Introduction. University of Nebraska Press. ISBN 0-8032-6580-8
- Frampton, Kenneth (1992). Modern Architecture, a critical history. Thames & Hudson- Third Edition. ISBN 0-500-20257-5
- Johnson, Phillip & Wigley, Mark (1988). Deconstructivist Architecture: The Museum of Modern Art, New York. Little Brown and Company. ISBN 0-87070-298-X
- Hays, K.M. (ed.) (1998). Oppositions Reader. Princeton Architectural Press. ISBN 1-56898-153-8
- Kandinsky, Wassily. Point and Line to Plane. Dover Publications, New York. ISBN 0-486-23808-3
- McLeod, Mary, "Architecture and Politics in the Reagan Era: From Postmodernism to Deconstructivism," "Assemblage," 8 (1989), pp. 23–59.
- Poisson, Michel (2009). 1000 Immeubles et monuments de Paris (in French). Parigramme. ISBN 978-2-84096-539-8.
- Rickey, George (1995). Constructivism: Origins and Evolution. George Braziller; Revised edition. ISBN 0-8076-1381-9
- Salingaros, Nikos (2008). "Anti-Architecture and Deconstruction", 3rd edition. Umbau-Verlag, Solingen, Germany. ISBN 978-3-937954-09-7
- Taschen, Aurelia; Taschen, Balthazar (2016). L'Architecture Moderne de A à Z (in French). Bibliotheca Universalis. ISBN 978-3-8365-5630-9.
- Tschumi, Bernard (1994). Architecture and Disjunction. The MIT Press. Cambridge. ISBN 0-262-20094-5
- Van der Straeten, Bart. Image and Narrative – The Uncanny and the architecture of Deconstruction Retrieved April, 2006.
- Venturi, Robert (1966). Complexity and Contradiction in Architecture, The Museum of Modern Art Press, New York. ISBN 0-87070-282-3
- Venturi, Robert (1977). Learning from Las Vegas (with D. Scott Brown and S. Izenour), Cambridge MA, 1972, revised 1977. ISBN 0-262-72006-X
- Wigley, Mark (1995). The Architecture of Deconstruction: Derrida's Haunt. The MIT Press. ISBN 0-262-73114-2.
- Vicente Esteban Medina (2003) Forma y composición en la Arquitectura deconstructivista, © Tesis doctoral, Universidad Politécnica de Madrid. Registro Propiedad Intellectual Madrid Nº 16/2005/3967. Link de descarga de tesis en pdf: http://oa.upm.es/481/
