= Emy von Stetten =

German operatic soprano

- Born: 6 April 1898; Königsberg
- Died: 22 February 1980 (aged 81)
- Occupations: Soprano; Academic teacher
- Organizations: Musikhochschule Frankfurt

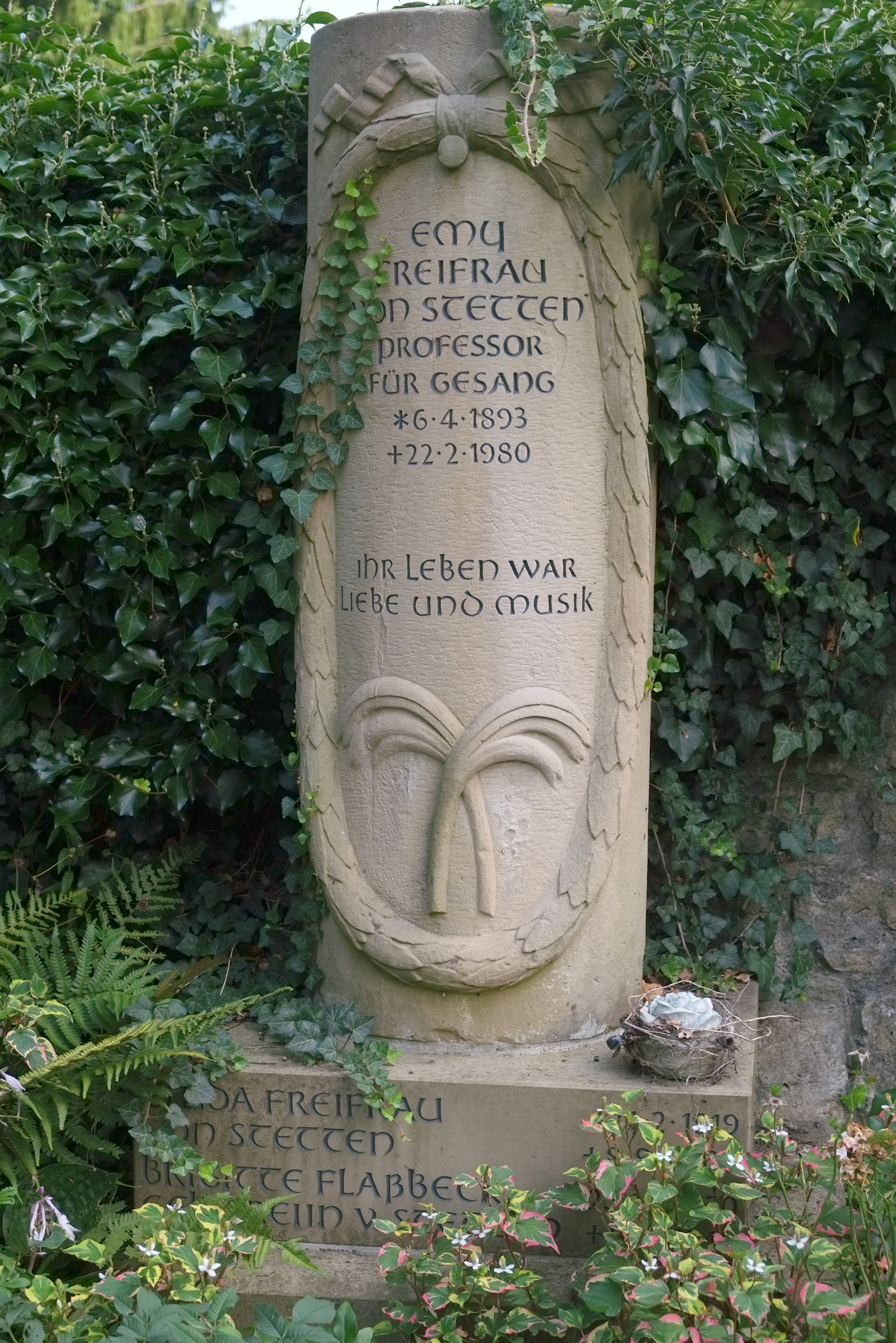
Grave of Emy von Stetten at the Kocherstetten cemetory

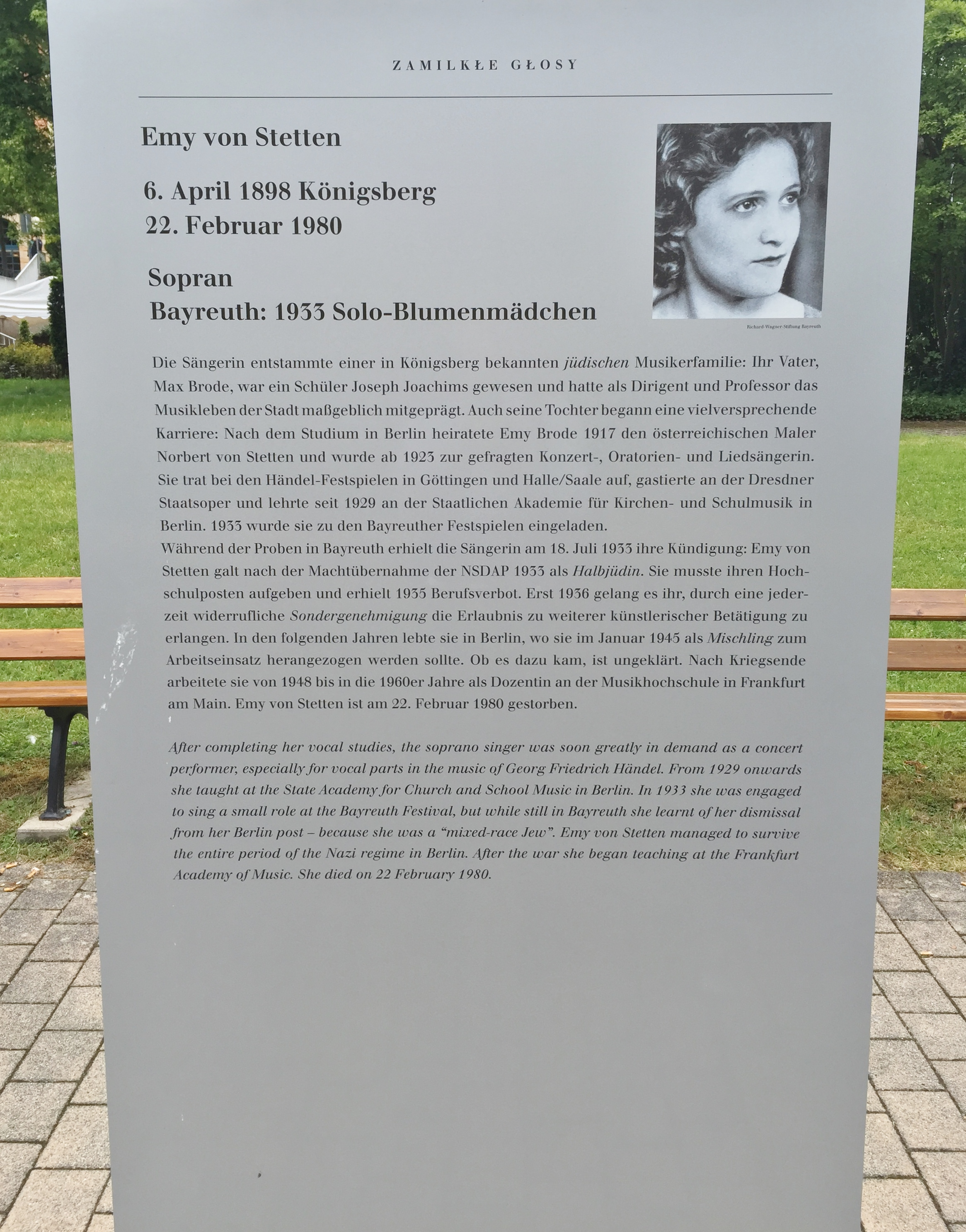
Memorial plaque for Emy von Stetten in Bayreuth

Emy Freifrau von Stetten (6 April 1898 – 22 February 1980) was a German oratorio, opera and Lied soprano and music teacher at the Musikhochschule Frankfurt.

== Life ==
Born Emilie Brode in Königsberg, she was a daughter of Ellida Wittich and Max Brode, the founder and conductor of the Königsberg Symphony Orchestra. Until her divorce in 1948, she was married to the Austrian painter Norbert von Stetten. The marriage produced two daughters, Ellida (1919-2008) and Brigitte (b. 1920).

During the National Socialist era, she was banned from performing as a "half-Jew", although she emphasised her own National Socialist sentiments and her husband's party membership, and was only given special permits to work as a music teacher. In Herbert Gerigk's and Theophil Stengel's Lexikon der Juden in der Musik her name already appeared in the first edition (1940).
