= Die Musik =

German music magazine

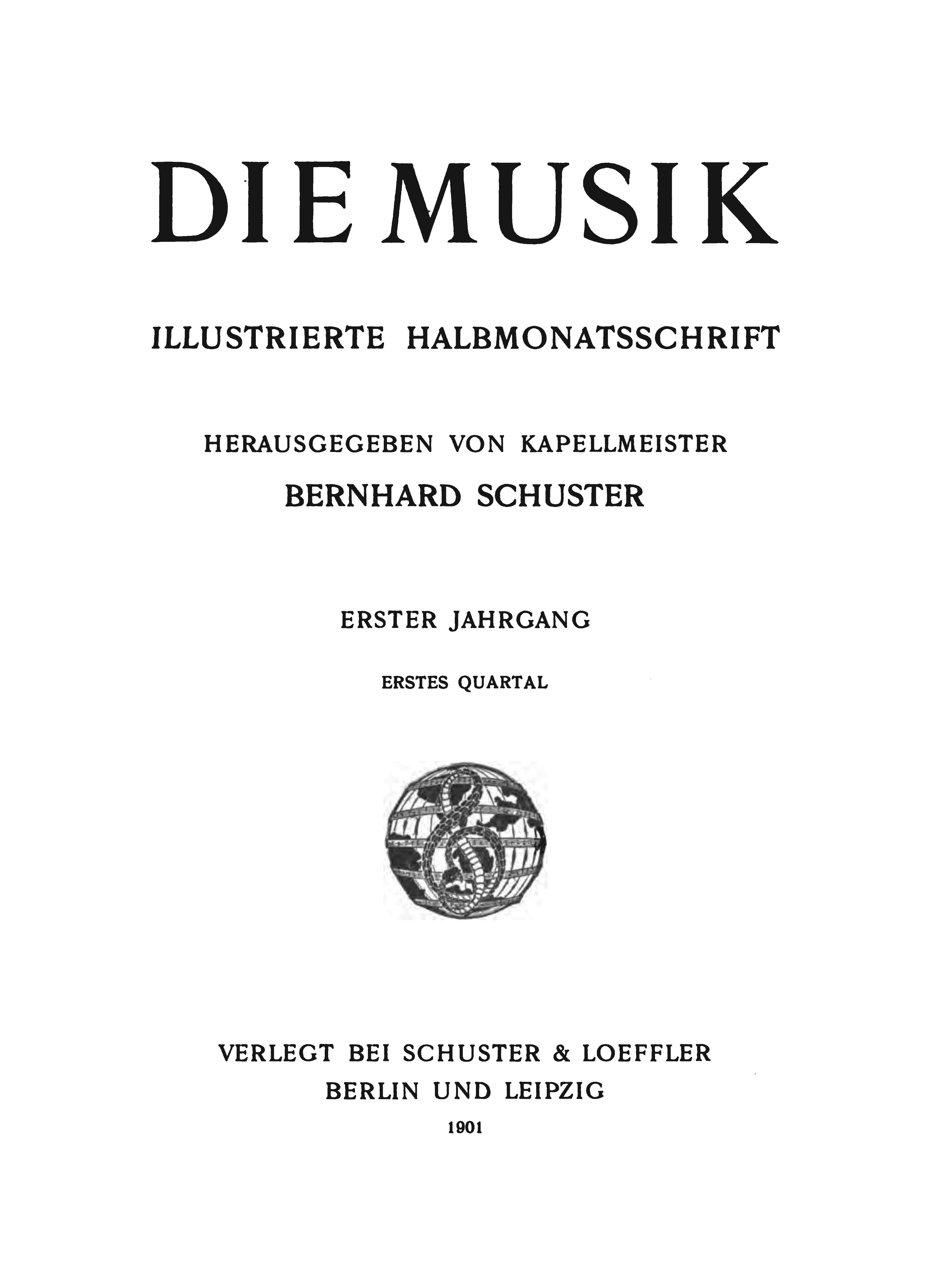
- Editor: Bernhard Schuster
- Categories: Music magazine
- Frequency: Semimonthly
- First issue: January 1, 1901
- Final issue: February 1943
- Company: Schuster & Loeffler; Deutsche Verlags-Anstalt (de)
- Country: Germany
- Based in: Berlin
- Language: German

Die Musik was a German music magazine established in 1901 by Bernhard Schuster (1870–1934). It was published semimonthly by Schuster & Loeffler from Berlin and Leipzig. Schuster was its editor-in-chief from inception until July 1933, when the publication was taken over by the Third Reich. The final publication, under the name Die Musik, was February 1943.

== History ==
First published on 20 September 1901, Die Musik ran semimonthly until September 1915, with publication suspended because of World War I. In 1922, the publisher, Schuster & Loeffler, merged with the Stuttgart firm Deutsche Verlags-Anstalt (de); and in October 1922, Die Musik (Vol. 25, Issue 1) resumed with Schuster as editor. A leaflet attached to the June 1933 issue marked its beginning as the official music journal of the Nazi Party. The publication continued through 1943, changing its name in 1943 to Musik im Kriege (Music in War) and continued through 1944.

Die Musik was the first German magazine to publish special issues called "Sonderhefte" — Wagner-Heft, February 1902. By 1932, Die Musik had published 120 special issues. Schuster stated that the 14 Beethoven and 15 Wagner issues equated to 8 to 10 yearbooks.

According to Stephen W. Brown, Die Musik was the most successful music periodical in Germany because it targeted readership, from laypeople, to musicians, to scholars. Brown commented that Die Musik was remarkable for its variety and attention to jazz, but was silenced for political reasons in 1934. Its importance in musicology is significant, especially considering, according to Brown, that the dominant periodicals for musicology of that era were German.

=== History during the Third Reich ===
According to the thesis of book by Erik Levi — Mozart and the Nazis: How the Third Reich Abused a Cultural Icon — the Third Reich embraced the artistic heritage as its domain. Because Die Musik was the most prestigious German-language music magazine of the first half of the twentieth century, the Third Reich took a special interest in requisitioned as the official bulletin of the RJF.

In its new role, Die Musik spearheaded several Nazi initiatives, including one called "Organ des Amtes für Kunstpflege beim Beauftragten des Führers für die gesamte geistige und weltanschauliche Schulung der NSDAP", commonly known as "Amt Rosenberg".

=== Editors during the Third Reich ===
Die Musik, under the editorship of Schuster, had been relatively apolitical. The editors during the Third Reich were Johannes Gunther (born 1901), Friedrich W. Herzog (1902–1976), and Herbert Gerigk. Schuster had been editor until July 1933. Gunther, of the Reichsjugendführer, became editor in August 1933. On 1 April 1934 Die Musik became the official bulletin of the Reichsjugendführer. Herzog, one of 88 German writers who signed the "Gelöbnis treuester Gefolgschaft", a pledge of allegiance to Hitler, became editor on 1 July 1934. Gerigk, of the Reichsjugendführer, was a chief collaborator in the Nazi music administration. Among other things, he co-authored the antisemitic Lexikon der Juden in der Musik in 1941. From September 1936 to June 1937, Die Musik was the official bulletin of the Militant League for German Culture. In October 1937, Die Musik became the official musical voice of the Department for Art Preservation under Reich leader Rosenberg.

In March 1943, Die Musik merged with Zeitschrift für Musik, Allgemeine Musikzeitung, and Neues Musikblatt to form Musik im Kriege (de), which resumed under its new name for the April/May 1943 issue with Gerigk as editor-in-chief.

== Literature ==
- Roberge, Marc-André. "Die Musik (1901-44): la transformation d’un périodique à travers trois périodes de l’histoire allemande". Ph.D. diss., University of Toronto, 1988 (xxi, 445 p.). Available on ProQuest (subscription required).
- Roberge, Marc-André. "Le périodique Die Musik (1901-1944) et sa transformation à travers trois périodes de l’histoire allemande". Revue de musicologie (Société française de musicologie) 78, no. 1 (1992): 109-44.
- Roberge, Marc-André. "Les guerres mondiales et la dictature nazie dans les pages du périodique Die Musik". In Music and Dictatorship in Europe and South America, ed. Roberto Illiano and Massimiliano Sala (Fondazione Locatelli, Cremona), 141-70. Speculum musicae, vol. 14. Brepols: Turnhout, 2009.
