= Fritz Stege =

German music journalist

Fritz Stege (11 April 1896 – 31 March 1967) was a German music journalist in the era of National Socialism and composer of accordion music.

== Life ==
Born in Witterschlick, Stege attended a Realgymnasium in Berlin and was drafted at the beginning of the First World War, in the war where he lost his father who had also been drafted. From 1919 to 1923 he studied musicology with Jean Paul Ertel and Johannes Wolf at the University of Berlin and was awarded a doctorate with a dissertation on Constantin Christian Dedekind. During his student days, Stege composed Schlager, which he had to dismiss as a youthful sin during the period of National Socialism when he was a victim of intrigue. Stege worked as a freelance music critic and music writer. He published his own "Kulturkorrespondenz für Musik" (cultural correspondence for music) and worked as an editor for various specialist journals.

In the Weimar Republic, Stege had been a follower of radical right-wing groups since the early 1920s and from 1927 to 1929 he was Music Reporter of the German Völkisch Freedom Party. For political reasons, he prevented a concert tour of Felix Weingartner through the Palatinate in 1928 "by initiating a general press offensive". He joined the NSDAP in 1930 with membership number 410.480 and became "Fachspartenleiter Schrifttum" in 1932 in the Kampfbund für deutsche Kultur.

After the Machtergreifung, Stege became head of the "Arbeitsgemeinschaft Deutscher Musikkritiker" (Association of German Music Critics) and was commissioned by the party to "clean up the German music critic scene" but got into a dispute over organisational issues with Friedrich W. Herzog of the Reichsverband deutscher Schriftsteller. In March 1933, he denounced Fritz Jöde to Hans Hinkel and protected in his place Otto Jochum, who applied to educate the misguided youth with a new kind of folk music education in order to build up the service of the fatherland. Stege became press officer of the Reichsmusikkammer and press officer of the Reichs-Rundfunk-Gesellschaft. As a film editor he published the foreign press service of the Tobis and joined the picture editorial department of the UFA. Stege was the music critic of the party organ Völkischer Beobachter and also wrote for the SS newspaper Das Schwarze Korps. In May 1933, Stege demanded in an article in the Neue Zeitschrift für Musik, of which he had become editor-in-chief, the assumption of power in opera houses and orchestras. In May 1933, he summed up the restrictions on jazz music on German radio that "us" had demanded in April 1932: "Today Negro jazz has been banned on Berlin radio." Stege also demanded "the exclusion of foreign dance bands". He boasted in his Zeitschrift für Musik that his influence had replaced Hans Mersmann as editor of the magazine Melos, that he had contributed to the dismissals of Carl Ebert and Otto Klemperer, and that he had helped the National Socialists Richard Trunk and Otto Krauß to find new jobs.

In the Völkischer Beobachter he called for the exclusion of Jews from German musical life. In a report on the German Composers' Day 1934, at which Richard Strauss spoke, Stege formulated his folk concept of art:

It is not about the direction of art, but about the kind of art. The people should live again in art and the artist in the people! This is the first task of the National Socialist art policy.

In keeping with this, he went under the censorship of jazz music and accused a composer like Boris Blacher of being close to jazz music.

For the Austrian composer Roderich Mojsisovics he wrote the libretto for his Nordic folk opera in 3 acts Norden in Not, which premiered in 1936.

Nothing more is known about Steg's "superficial denazification". Stege's book Bilder aus der deutschen Musikkritik (1936) was added to the List of literature to be discarded. His novel Aber abseits, wer ist's?, which was still published in 1944, was included in the GDR List of literature to be discarded in 1952/3. In 1951, Stege founded a private music school in Wiesbaden and worked there as a course instructor at the Volkshochschule, the Humboldt-Institut and the Jugendmusikschule. As a music critic, he now wrote for the Wiesbadener Kurier. For his services to the promotion of folk music the Hessischer Sängerbund awarded him the silver honorary pin, the Deutscher Harmonika-Verband, and the golden honorary pin.

== Books ==
- Constantin Christian Dedekind, ein Dichter und Musiker des 17. Jhs. Diss. Berlin 1922
- Das Okkulte in der Musik. Beiträge zu einer Metaphysik der Musik. E. Bisping, Münster i. W. 1925.
- Bilder aus der deutschen Musikkritik. Kritische Kämpfe in 2 Jh. Regensburg: Bosse 1936
- Tönendes Licht. In Zeitschrift für Musik. Vol. 103, Nr. 10, October 1936, ZDB-ID 203042-1, p. 1235.
- Aber abseits, wer ist's? Ein Musikroman. Stolle, Freital 1/Dresden/Leipzig/Berlin 1944.
- Ernst Bücken: Wörterbuch der Musik Überarb. u. erg. v. Fritz Stege. Dieterich, Wiesbaden 1953
- Musik, Magie, Mystik. Verl. Der Leuchter Reichl, Remagen 1961.
- Musik hören, verstehen, erleben. Eine Einführung. Wancura, Wien/Köln 1962.

Essays

- Auszugsweise wiedergegeben bei Joseph Wulf: Musik im Dritten Reich. 1963
- Randglossen zum Musikleben. In Zeitschrift für Musik, 1933
- Aufruf an die deutsche Musikkritik. In Zeitschrift für Musik, May 1933
- Erfüllte Anregungen und Wünsche. In Zeitschrift für Musik, May 1933
- Zukunftsaufgaben der Musikwissenschaft. In Zeitschrift für Musik, May 1933
- Der „privilegierte Irrtum“ H.H. Stuckenschmidt – Eine Abrechnung. In Deutsche Kultur-Wacht, 1933
- Städtische Musikpreise. In Zeitschrift für Musik, August 1933
- Geige und Saxophon. In Deutsche Kultur-Wacht, December 1933
- Deutsche und nordische Musik. In Zeitschrift für Musik, December 1934
- Berliner Musik. In Zeitschrift für Musik, January 1935

== Compositions ==
- Nordische Tanzfolge, 1936
- Nordlandsklänge, 1937
- Nordische Volkstänze, 1938
- Heidebilder. Bauernwalzer. Hohner, Trossingen/Württ. 1944.
- Vogelstimmen. Kleine Spielstücke. Hohner, Trossingen/Württ. 1955.
- Kasperlespiele. Kleine Spielstücke. Hohner, Trossingen/Württ. 1955.
- Aus den vier Winden. Konzert-Suite. Preissler, München 1957.
