= Helmuth Osthoff =

German musicologist (1896–1983)

Helmuth Osthoff (13 August 1896 – 9 February 1983) was a German musicologist and composer. Much of his career was spent at Frankfurt University, prior to which he held posts at Halle University and Berlin University. He wrote the first major biography on the composer Josquin des Prez, published as a two volume monograph in 1962 and 1965.

== Life ==
Born in Bielefeld, Osthoff, son of the bank director Heinrich Osthoff and his wife Berta, née Tepel, began his musical education while still at grammar school, taking lessons in piano playing, music theory, score playing and musical composition with Otto Wetzel in Bielefeld and Wilhelm Niessen in Münster. After Osthoff had taken part in the First World War from 1915 to 1918, he studied musicology, history of art and philosophy from 1919, first at Westfälische Wilhelms-Universität in Münster and from 1920 at Humboldt-Universität zu Berlin. In 1922, as a student of Johannes Wolf, he was awarded the title of Dr. ph. with his dissertation Der Lautenist Santini Garsi da Parma. After further musical training in composition with Wilhelm Klatte, piano with James Kwast and conducting with Gustav Brecher, which he completed both privately and at the Berlin Stern Conservatory, he was initially répétiteur at the Leipzig Opera from 1923 to 1926 under Generalmusikdirektor Gustav Brecher.

In 1926 Osthoff was appointed assistant to Arnold Schering at the Martin Luther University of Halle-Wittenberg and followed him in 1928 as his senior assistant at the Department of Music History of the Berlin University. After Osthoff had habilitated in 1932 with the essay Die Niederländer und das deutsche Lied, he took over the music historical editing in 1935. At the end of 1937 he was appointed to the Johann-Wolfgang-Goethe-Universität Frankfurt am Main, first as a substitute, from 1938 as a civil servant extraordinary professor, director of the musicological institute and university music director. In this function he headed the Collegium musicum until 1963.

Osthoff became a member of the National Socialist German Workers' Party with effect from 1 May 1937 (membership number 5,377,880). He was also a member of the National Socialist People's Welfare Organization, the Reichsluftschutzbund and the National Socialist German Lecturers League and was deputy head of the foreign office of the Nationalsozialistischer Deutscher Studentenbund. In 1938, as a participant in the musicological conference within the framework of the Reichsmusiktage, Osthoff gave a lecture on the topic Das Besetzungsproblem in der Musik des Barockzeitalters.

Osthoff had close contacts with Herbert Gerigk, the head of the main music department at the Beauftragter des Führers für die Überwachung der gesamten geistigen und weltanschaulichen Schulung und Erziehung der NSDAP, Alfred Rosenberg. As late as mid-1939, Gerigk envisaged him, along with Friedrich Blume, Wolfgang Boetticher, Werner Danckert, Rudolf Gerber, Erich Schenk, Erich Schumann and Rudolf Sonner, as co-author of an extensive music encyclopaedia as part of the planned Advanced School of the NSDAP. In mid-August 1939 Osthoff agreed to. However, this project broke down with the beginning of World War II, in which Osthoff participated in the Battle of France as a lieutenant (reserve officer) of the Wehrmacht until 1940. After the occupation of Belgium, Osthoff was stationed in Brussels and received a letter from Gerigk on 13 July 1940 in which he inquired about the state of the Brussels music collections and whether the manuscript departments had remained intact. Osthoff concealed his activities in Belgium in his self-portrayal in Die Musik in Geschichte und Gegenwart and wrote only: "In 1939/40 he was a war veteran.

In the winter semester of 1940/41 Osthoff resumed his teaching activities at Frankfurt University, but remained a staff member in the main music department of the Fuehrer's commissioner for the supervision of the entire intellectual and ideological training and education of the NSDAP. As late as 1944, Osthoff was classified as "politically reliable" in an assessment and that he was "one of the best representatives of his field".

After the end of the war and the conclusion of the denazification proceedings, Osthoff was able to resume teaching at the musicological seminar in Frankfurt am Main in 1948. In 1950 he became personal Ordinarius and in 1959 titular professor. He undertook various research trips on the history of the Franco-Flemish music of the 15th and 16th centuries. After his Emeritus in 1964, he moved to Würzburg in 1973, where he worked on a volume of cantatas for the Neue Bach-Ausgabe until shortly before his death

Osthoff was the father of the musicologist Wolfgang Osthoff (1927−2008). He died in Würzburg at the age of 86.

== Achievements ==
Osthoff's research on Franco-Flemish music of the 15th and 16th centuries resulted in numerous individual studies and the two-volume monograph on Josquin des Prez, which according to his biographer Wolfgang Osthoff is still considered a standard work and is only outdated in details. In addition to his scientific and editorial activities, Osthoff composed songs, cantatas and one string quartet.

== Publications ==
- Der Lautenist Santino Garsi da Parma : ein Beitrag zur Geschichte der oberitalienischen Lautenmusik am Ausgang d. Spätrenaissance; mit einem Überblick über die Musikverhältnisse Parmas im 16. Jahrhundert und 58 bisher unveröffentlichten Kompositionen der Zeit. Breitkopf & Härtel, Leipzig 1926. Faksimilenachdruck: Breitkopf & Härtel, Wiesbaden 1973.
- Die Niederländer und das deutsche Lied (1400–1640). Junker und Dünnhaupt, Berlin 1938, Facsimile reprint with afterword, corrections and additions by the author, H. Schneider, Tutzing 1967.
- Johannes Brahms und seine Sendung. Published in the series Kriegsvorträge Universität Bonn, Bonner Universitätsbuchdruck, Bonn 1942.
- Josquin Desprez. Volume 1. H. Schneider, Tutzing 1962.
- Josquin Desprez. Volume 2. H. Schneider, Tutzing 1965.
- numerous special studies on Josquin des Prez.

Essays during the NS period

- Die Anfänge d. Musikgeschichtsschreibung in Deutschland. In Acta Musicologica V, 1933, pp. 97–107.
- Einwirkungen d. Gegenreformation auf die Musik des 16. Jh. In Jb. Peters f. 1934, pp. 32–50.
- Friedrich der Große als Komponist. In Zeitschrift für Musik 103, 1936, pp. 917–20, wieder in Friedrich d. Gr., Herrscher zw. Tradition u. Fortschritt, 1985, p. 179 ff.
- Deutsche Liedweisen und Wechselgesänge im mittelalterlichen Drama. In Archiv f. Musikforsch. VI, 1942, pp. 65–81.
- Die Musik im Drama des deutschen Mittelalters. In Deutsche Musikkultur 1943, p. 29–40.

Editions

- Adam Krieger (1634-1666): Neue Beiträge zur Geschichte des deutschen Liedes im 17. Jahrhundert. Breitkopf & Härtel, Leipzig 1929.
- Rogier Michael, Die Geburt unseres Herren Jesu Christi 1602. 1937, new edition: Bärenreiter-Verlag, Kassel 1953.
- Rogier Michael, Die Empfängnis unseres Herren Jesu Christi 1602. 1937 (both also in Handbook of German Protestant Church Music, 1935 ff.).
- Johann Sigismund Kusser, Arien, Duette u. choir from "Erindo". In Das Erbe deutscher Musik, Landschaftsdenkmale Schleswig-Holstein u. Hansestädte III, 1938;
- Das deutsche Chorlied vom 16. Jahrhundert bis zur Gegenwart, in the series: Das Musikwerk, Arno Volk-Verlag, Cologne 1955, new edition: Arno Volk-Verlag, Cologne 1960.
- J. S. Bach, Neue Ausgabe sämtlicher Werke I/23: Kantaten zum 16. und 17. Sonntag nach Trinitatis, 1982 (one of the cantatas edited by R. Hallmark).

Legacy

- Letters by H. Osthoff from 1936 to 1948 are held by the Leipzig music publisher C.F.Peters in the Staatsarchiv Leipzig.
