= Stadttheater Königsberg =

Historical Prussian performing arts theater

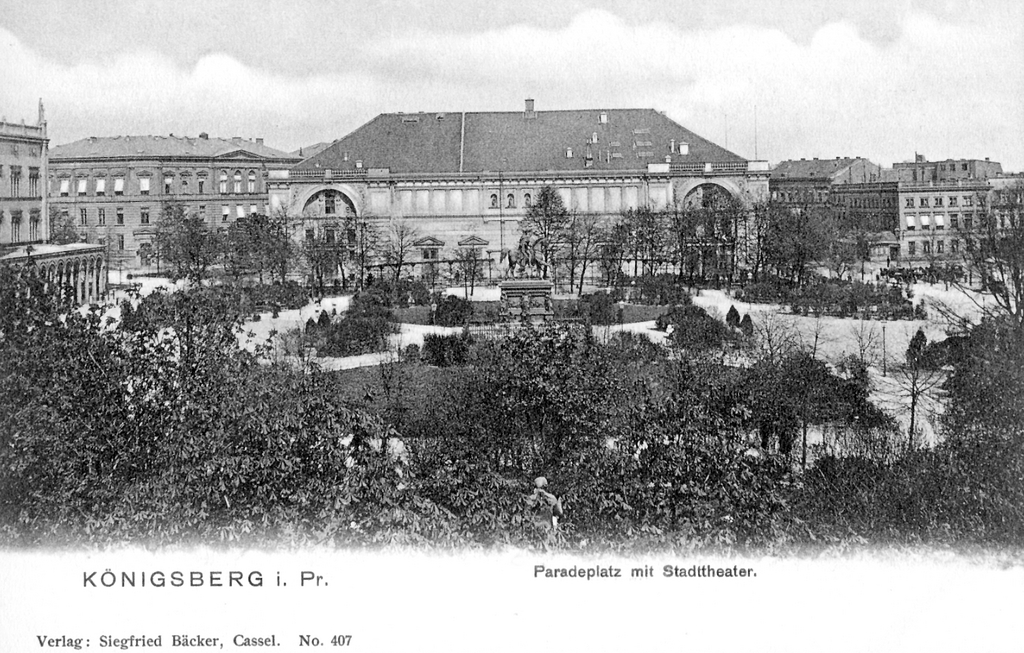
Back of the Stadttheater

For over 200 years, the Stadttheater Königsberg (Königsberg municipal theatre) in Königsberg was one of the most respected theatres in Prussia and in the German Empire.

== History ==
=== Forerunner ===
The Königsberg theatre began with carnival games and school comedies at the beginning of the 16th century. In 1552, Conquest of Rome by Georg Sabinus was performed in the courtyard, and in 1573 The Fall of Man by the schoolmaster Roll. In 1605, Marie Eleonore of Cleves had English comedians perform for her in Königsberg Castle. In 1618, they played Shakespeare. The first opera, Cleomedes by Heinrich Albert, was performed by students in 1635 before Władysław IV Vasa. In 1688 Christopher Marlowe's The Tragic History of Doctor Faustus was performed. Arranged by director Hilferding, the Schönemann company played Dr. Faustus, Molière's Tartuffe and Gottsched's The Dying Cato.

In 1753 Frederick the Great donated Kreytzenschen Square to the theatre director Konrad Ernst Ackermann to build a permanent theatre. With the money of businessman Friedrich Saturgus, Ackermann built the 300-seat theatre as the first in the Kingdom of Prussia. It was opened in 1755 with Racine's "Mithridate". Lessing's Miss Sara Sampson followed. Fearing the Seven Years' War, Ackermann left Königsberg in 1756 and went to Leipzig.

In 1768 Theodor Gottlieb von Hippel the Elder wrote the first theatre reviews in Johann Jakob Kanter's Königsberg Scholars and Political Newspapers. In 1769 director Karl Theophil Döbbelin performed Minna von Barnhelm. Caroline Schuch used the Singspiel between 1771 and 1787. In 1785 there were the first performances of The Robbers, The Fiesco Conspiracy in Genoa, Don Carlos and Clavigo. In 1788 the Schuch siblings brought The Abduction from the Seraglio, in 1793 Don Giovanni and in 1794 The Magic Flute.

In 1795 the theatre burned down. Plays continued in the old town of Junkerhof. The first performance of The Marriage of Figaro took place there in 1798. In 1800 a new theatre was built on the old site based on a design by Friedrich Gilly. After another fire, it was rebuilt in 1802. Director Steinberg brought Zacharias Werner's Consecration of Power, Wallenstein and Mary Stuart in 1803, Nathan the Wise in 1804 and The Bride of Messina in 1807. At the beginning of the Coalition Wars, songs by Max von Schenkendorf were performed. In 1809 Racine's tragedy Phèdre was staged. After that the theatre became a concert and society centre.

=== Municipal theatre ===
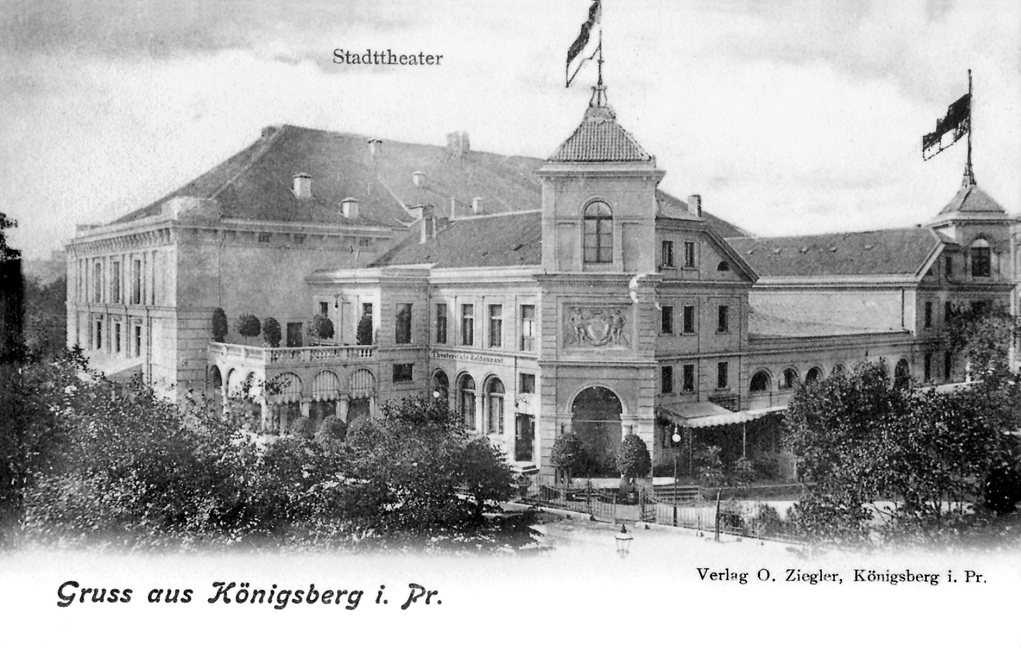
New foyer

The foundation stone for the municipal theatre was laid in 1806 by the Minister for East Prussia of the German Empire Friedrich von Schrötter on Paradeplatz (Königsberg)). The building, designed by Johann Valerian Müller, stood partly on the foundations of the garrison church that was still under construction. On 9 March 1808, director Carl Steinberg opened it in the presence of the court with the opera La clemenza di Tito. For unexplained reasons, the building burned down on 1 July 1808. The reopening took place in the presence of the royal couple in December 1809 with the festival The Consecration. The theatre premiered William Tell (Schiller) in 1810, and The Maid of Orleans in 1811. August von Kotzebue was the artistic director. In 1815, Iphigenia in Tauris and Götz von Berlichingen were performed. In 1819, director Hurray brought the first performances of Fidelio and Der Freischütz.

After the collapse of the theatre in 1828 and the dissolution of the ensemble, The Broken Jug premiered in 1830 and Faust in 1832. The world premiere of The Last Held of Marienburg by Joseph von Eichendorff in 1831 was unsuccessful. The composer Richard Wagner was Kapellmeister at the city theatre from 1836 to 1837. In 1836 he married the actress Minna Planer, who was engaged there, in the Tragheim Church. In 1854 the theatre received gas lighting. For years, German Student Corps from Corps Littuania and Corps Masovia acted as doormen. They had to make sure that only students who had been designated by the Albertus pin were allowed to enter the ground floor for 6 Silbergroschen. In return, they were allowed to watch the performance free of charge.

At the time, the students were in close contact with the actors and operas. They liked to socialise with the youth. They were not averse to the sympathies they had gained and thus a strong applause during the performances. Among other things, a hero tenor Wild was a welcome guest at Masovia, and the meeting with Karl Helmerding was a highlight. This well-educated comedian was a member of the Wallner Theatre. Franz Wallner, previously director of the German theatre in Poznan, had once taken over it, helped it to gain a good reputation and later even to give it its name. In the spring of 1859, Helmerding received the usual storms of applause as a guest in Königsberg. He was introduced to Masovia by a colleague. He liked it there so much that he invited all the young corps brothers to a big cab and coffee table ride to Hufen, which was in front of the fortress belt at that time. The return of the many carriages that made their way through the city to the theatre, roused with songs, only increased the artist's evening success.

— Wanda von Puttkamer

In 1879, under the direction of Max Staegemann and conducted by Emil Paur, the German premiere of Bizet's Carmen began, with which it began its global triumph. After the theatre collapsed again after 1890, the foyer was rebuilt and restaurants were added in 1893. In 1903 the theatre was fitted out with electrical lighting. At the beginning of the First World War, the theatre was rededicated as a hospital. Reopened on 27 August 1918 as a pure opera house, in 1924 it was merged with the New Playhouse to form the East Prussian State Theatre. The first performance of Der Rosenkavalier by Richard Strauss took place in 1927. In 1928 the city acquired both theatres. The history of the theatre ended in World War II when it burned to the ground during the air raids on Königsberg at the end of August 1944.

== Directors and artistic directors ==
- Caroline Schuch
- 1802: Carl Steinberg, son of Caroline Schuch
- 1809: Anton Schwartz
- 1810: Carl Steinberg
- 1811–1812: Karl Friedrich Wilhelm Fleischer
- 1813–1814: Carl Beinhöfer
- 1816–1817: Daniel Huray
- 1824–1827: Adolph Schröder
- Konrad Ernst Ackermann (to 1756)
- 1763–1765: Franz Schuch the Younger
- Karl Theophil Döbbelin
- 1834–1842: Anton Hübsch
- 1843–1845: Friedrich Tietz
- 1845–1876: Arthur Woltersdorff
- 1876–1879: Max Staegemann
- 1880–1883: Albert Goldberg
- 1883–1886: Adolf Werther
- 1886–1890: Andreas August Amann
- 1890–1892: Heinrich Jantsch
- 1892–1912: Adolf Varena
- 1912–1914: Max Berg-Ehlert
- 1914–1918: Max Richards
- 1918–1920: Ludwig Hertzer
- 1920–1928: Josef Geißel
- 1928–1932: Hans Schüler

== People ==
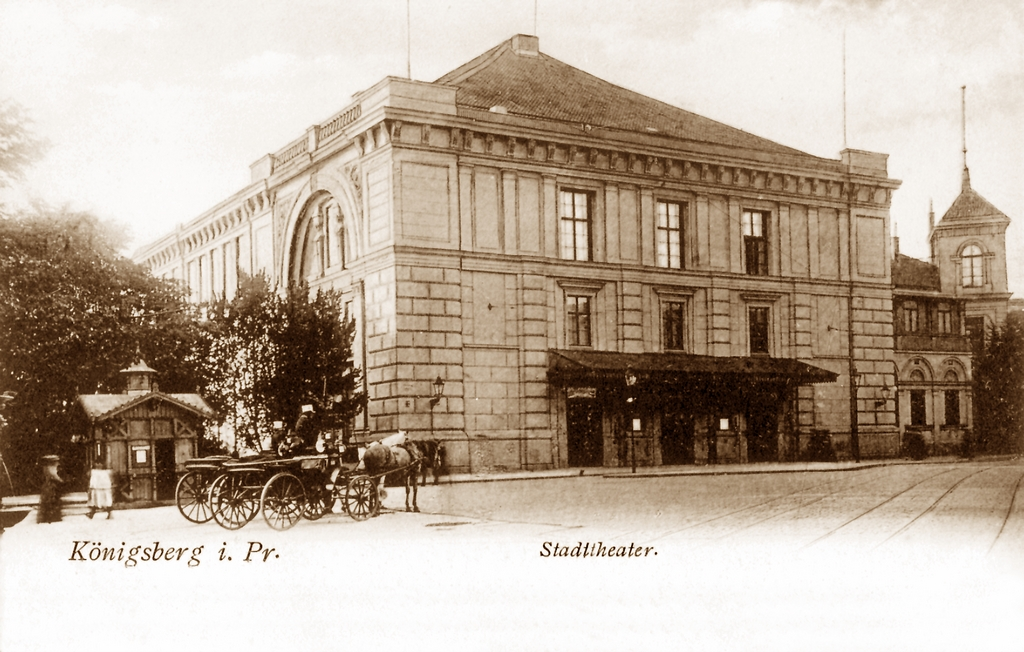
Side entrance, east side of Paradeplatz

The following people worked at the Königsberg City Theatre:

- Wilhelm Eisenblätter, 1898–1912 stage painter.
- Ilsemarie Schnering, actress
- Eberhard Keindorff, actor
- Louis Köhler, conductor and piano teacher
- Rudolf von Gottschall, dramaturge
- Richard Wagner, Kapellmeister
- Karl Franz Rankl, conductor
- Max Brode, concertmaster
- Erwin Scharfenorth, from 1925 set designer and head of equipment

== Literature ==
- Erhard Ross: The history of the royal box in the Königsberger Schauspielhaus from 1809 to 1915. A contribution to the Königsberg theatre history. In: Journal for Eastern Research, 43rd vol. (1994), Issue 1, pp. 54–70 (digitized version of the Bavarian State Library).
- Robert Albinus: Königsberg-Lexikon. City and Surroundings. Special Edition. Flechsig, Würzburg 2002, ISBN 3-88189-441-1.
- Richard Armstedt: History of the royal. Capital and residence city of Königsberg in Prussia. Hobbing & Büchle, Stuttgart 1899 (German Land and Life in Individual Descriptions. 2, City Stories), (Reprint: Melchior-Verlag, Wolfenbüttel 2006, ISBN 3-939102-70-9 (Historical Library)).
- Fritz Gause: The history of the city of Königsberg in Prussia. 3 volumes. 2nd / 3rd supplemented edition. Böhlau, Cologne a. a. 1996, ISBN 3-412-08896-X.
- Baldur Köster: Königsberg. Architecture from the German era. Husum Druck, Husum 2000, ISBN 3-88042-923-5.
- Jürgen Manthey: Königsberg. History of a world citizenship republic. Hanser, Munich a. a. 2005, ISBN 3-446-20619-1.
- Gunnar Strunz: Discover Königsberg. On the way between Memel and Haff. Trescher, Berlin 2006, ISBN 3-89794-071-X (Trescher series of trips).
