= Anna Schramm =

German opera singer, soubrette and stage actress (1835–2026

Portrait of Schramm by Heinrich Graf, ca. 1865

Anna Schramm (married Anna Bügler; 8 April 1835 — 1 June 1916) was a German operatic soprano, soubrette and stage actress.

== Life ==
Anna Schramm was born in Liberec, Bohemia. A daughter of the soprano and actress Henriette Schramm-Graham and the actor Nikolaus Schramm, and sister of Auguste Schramm and Amalie Schramm, Anna was trained by her mother, who gave up her own stage career in 1844 and from then on focused on looking after her family. Anna appeared on the stage as a child in Nuremberg in 1841, then in Dessau, Sondershausen, Rostock, Riga, Reval and in Cologne in 1852/1853, where she received dramatic tuition from Roderich Benedix. This was followed by stops in Königsberg, Danzig and then Braunschweig, where she received vocal training from Franz Abt.

In 1861 she went to the Wallner-Theater in Berlin, where she became a mainstay of the Berlin local farce until 1867 with operetta and soubrette roles alongside Karl Helmerding and others. She was a member of the Friedrich-Wilhelm-Städtisches Theater from 1867 to 1870, went on guest performance tours and, after her marriage in 1876 to the factory owner Ferdinand Conrad Bügler, retired from the stage to a house in Kötzschenbroda left by her mother. She separated from her husband in 1882 and resumed her stage career as a soubrette. From 1888, she was a member of the Wallner Theatre for the Fach of the Komische Alte, to which she also devoted herself at the Königliches Schauspielhaus in Berlin from 1891 to 1912.

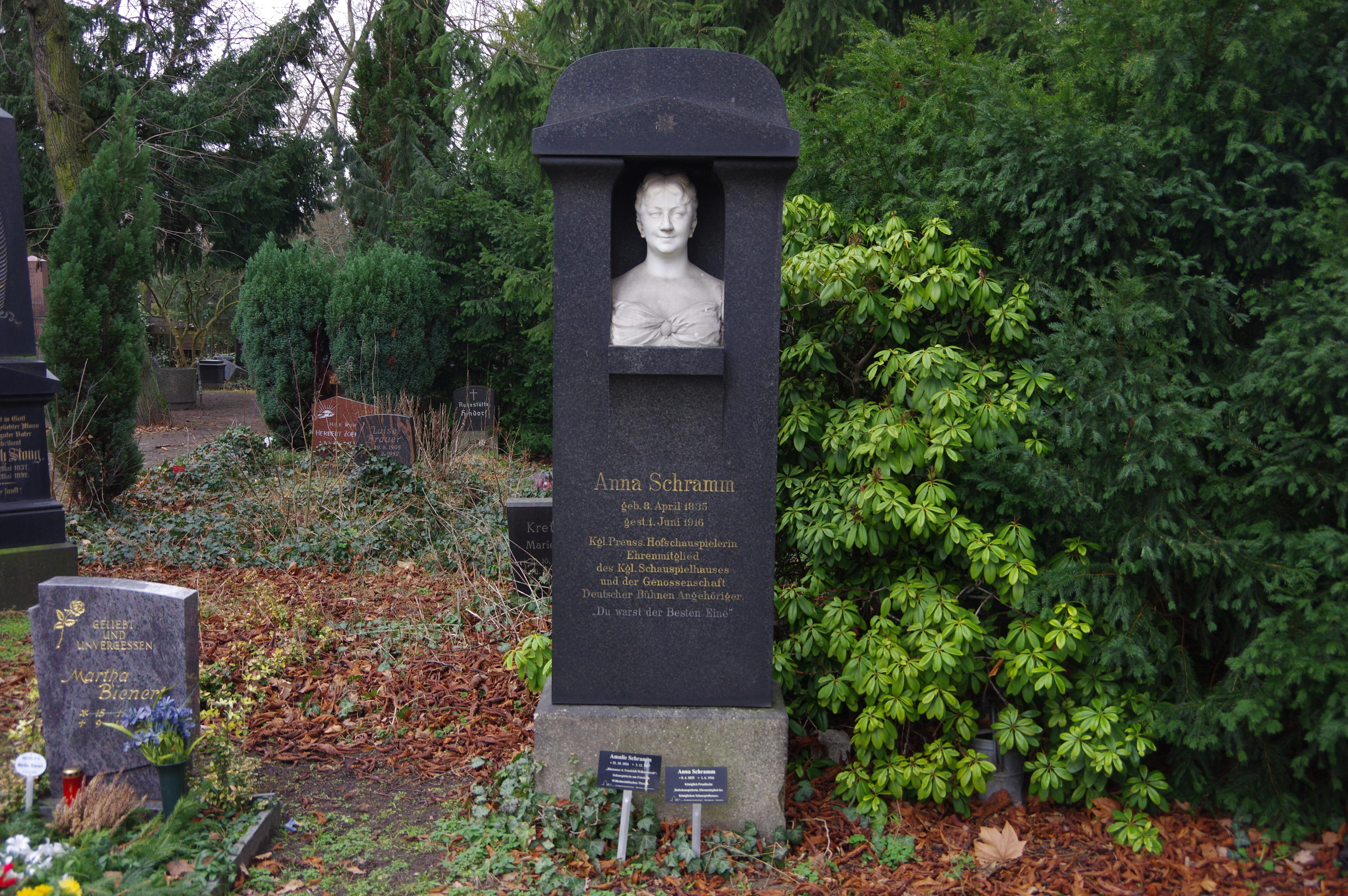
Schramm's grave with a marble bust created by Johannes Boese

After her mother's death in 1876, her sister Amalie, who had given up her own career in 1873, lived with her in Berlin.

At the age of 81, Schramm died in Berlin on 1 June 1916. Her final resting place is in a cemetery in Berlin-Kreuzberg. A niche of the grave stele contains a marble bust of the deceased, created by the sculptor Johannes Boese. A small inscription plaque on the gravestone also commemorates her sister Amalie, whose own grave in the same cemetery has not survived.

The inscription on Schramm's gravestone reads:

Kgl. Preuss. Hofschauspielerin
Ehrenmitglied
des Kgl. Schauspielhauses
und der Genossenschaft
Deutscher Bühnen Angehöriger
"Du warst der Besten Eine"
