= Wolfgang Boetticher =

German musicologist

Wolfgang Boetticher (19 August 1914 – 7 April 2002) was a German musicologist and longtime lecturer at the University of Göttingen.

Born in Bad Ems, Boetticher was arranger and editor of numerous works by the composer Robert Schumann, especially for the publishing house G. Henle in Munich.

== Life ==
Boetticher, son of a chemist in the civil service, studied musicology at the Humboldt-Universität zu Berlin after a pianistic education with Arnold Schering, Georg Schünemann, Curt Sachs, Hans Joachim Moser, Friedrich Blume and Helmuth Osthoff. Already during his studies he was active in the National Socialist German Students' League since 1934. In the Reichsstudentenführung he worked since 1937 in the music department. After an application on 20 February 1938, he became a member of the National Socialist German Workers' Party retroactively with effect from May 1, 1937 (Party number 5.919.688), for which he finally worked full-time. He was also a member of the Nationalsozialistische Volkswohlfahrt.

After he won his doctorate in 1939 with a dissertation dedicated to Robert Schumann (publication in 1941), Boetticher gained his habilitation in 1943 with his work Studien zur solistischen Lautenpraxis des 16. und 17. Jahrhunderts mit Bibliographie der intavolierten Lautendrucke und -hss.

From 1939 Boetticher was a consultant and director of the music-political liaison office in the Amt Rosenberg. During the Second World War he was also in the looting organization Reichsleiter Rosenberg Taskforce from 1940 to 1944. In 1940 Boetticher accompanied Alfred Rosenberg to Krakow and Warsaw to requisition music supplies. In doing so, the State Library and the Krakow archives were used to obtain music from the following sources, among others manuscripts of Frédéric Chopin's teacher Józef Elsner and materials from the Chopin Institute were confiscated and removed. In 1941 Boetticher was involved in the looting of the collection of the harpsichordist Wanda Landowska who had fled from the Nazis to Paris, and the confiscation of other Jewish properties.

In July 1941 Boetticher joined the Waffen-SS, where he made it as far as Unterscharführer. Since 1940 he was co-author of the Lexikon der Juden in der Musik. In 1942 he was promoted to Reichshauptstellenleiter of the ERR, and from 1944 he worked as a private lecturer in Berlin. In 1943 he was awarded the Robert Schumann Prize of the City of Zwickau.

After the end of the Second World War, Boetticher became a lecturer at the Georg-August-Universität Göttingen in 1948. There he was appointed professor in 1955. He became director of the Musicological Institute of the University in 1957 and was dean of the Faculty of Philosophy from 1972 to 1974. In 1963, he had a visiting professorship at the Charles University in Prague.

Boetticher's National Socialist past was not unknown in post-war Germany. In 1963 Joseph Wulf had already published several documents in his source work Music in the Third Reich, which proved Wolfgang Boetticher's National Socialist and antisemitic commitment. For example, he presented a document that proved Boetticher's involvement in the notorious antisemitic Lexikon der Juden in der Musik: Musik im Dritten Reich: Eine Dokumentation. Ullstein, Frankfurt am Main 1989 (unchanged reprint of the first edition in Sigbert Mohn Verlag, Gütersloh 1963), ISBN 3-550-07059-4. Nevertheless, Boetticher continued his career in musicology.

Even after his retirement he continued to give lectures in musicology seminars until the winter semester of 1998/99. After Willem de Vries revealed his activity in the Sonderstab Musik of the ERR, the lectures were discontinued with immediate effect by the seminar leaders.

Boetticher left behind handwritten memoirs in which he glossed over his activities during the NS era. These were published by Hans Schneider, Musikantiquariat und Verlag in Tutzing. Also in his self-portrayal in the first edition of Die Musik in Geschichte und Gegenwart vol. 2, 1952 he did not mention his activities outside of the university.

== Boetticher's Schumann research ==
Boetticher was considered an important Schumann researcher, although criticism of his publications was voiced from Nazi Germany.

As early as 29 April 1940, the Rosenberg law firm had announced in a confidential communication that "Boetticher had examined the entire Robert Schumann Archive with regard to "our ideological principles" and had made important discoveries which in many respects brought new knowledge about Schumann. These were allegedly antisemitic statements by Schumann, which Boetticher published in 1942 under the title Robert Schumann in his writings and letters. However, musicological investigations since the 1980s have shown that Boetticher forged some of Schumann's letters in order to portray him as antisemitic.

From today's perspective, the scientific assessment of his research is disappointing. The Schumann researcher Gerd Nauhaus gives examples: "Schumann's household accounts—like numerous other autobiographical documents—were mainly published in the works of W Boetticher (Robert Schumann. Einführung in Leben und Werk, 1941 and Robert Schumann in seiner Schriften und Briefen, 1942), but with such horrendous reading errors, distorting omissions and transpositions and misleading comments that they cannot be used without time-consuming verification in individual cases. This also applies to the letters and other records Boetticher uses. In addition, the directories of, for example, Schumann correspondence or as yet unpublished material that he has compiled are generally unreliable. What at times could be regarded as progress in Schumann research ultimately proved to be its main stumbling block. Nauhaus concludes: "The results are qualitatively truly devastating, and a reviewer who spoke of a 'fallen box of papers' hit the nail on the head: The philological unreliability of all Boetticher's Schumann works is striking. In his voluminous introduction (1941; reissued in 2004!), Boetticher also pursues a pale philosophical-aesthetic concept with unmistakable ideological influences of the Nazi era."

Boetticher died in Göttingen at the age of 87.

== Publications ==
- Deutsch sein heißt unklar scheinen. In Die Musik XXX/6, March 1938, pp. 399–404
- Die Kulturtagung der Reichsstudentenführung in Königsberg i. Pr. vom 22. bis 24. April 1938. In Die Musik XXX/8, May 1938
- Zur Erkenntnis von Rasse und Volkstum in der Musik. In: Musik im Volk. Grundfragen der Musikerziehung, edited by W. Stumme. Berlin 1939, p. 217–229
- Robert Schumann. Einführung in Persönlichkeit und Werk. Beiträge zur Erkenntniskritik der Musikgeschichte und Studien am Ausdrucksproblem des 19. Jahrhunderts. Festschrift zur 130. Wiederkehr des Geburtstages vom Robert Schumann, Berlin: Hahnefeld, 1941 (Veröffentlichung der deutschen Robert Schumann Gesellschaft; Hochschulschrift; zugleich Berlin, Phil. Diss., 1942). Überarbeitete Neuausgabe unter dem Titel: Robert Schumann – Leben und Werk, Noetzel Verlag 2004, ISBN 3-7959-0804-3
- Orlando di Lasso und seine Zeit, 2 volumes, Kassel 1958
- Von Palestrina zu Bach, Stuttgart 1959
- Dokumente und Briefe um Orlando di Lasso, Kassel 1960
- Neue Materialien zu Robert Schumanns Wiener Bekanntenkreis. In Studien zur Musikwissenschaft, volume 25 (Festschrift für Erich Schenk), Graz-Wien-Köln 1962, pp. 37–55
- Aus Orlando di Lassos Wirkungskreis, (Veröff. der Ges. für Bayerische Musikgeschichte, vol. 1), Kassel 1963
- Robert Schumanns Klavierwerke (Quellenkat. zur Mg., vol. 9), Wilhelmshaven 1977
- Handschriftlich überlieferte Lauten- und Gitarrentabulaturen des 15. bis 18. Jahrhunderts (Répertoire International des Sources Musicales, B VII). Günter Henle, Munich (1978 and) 1986, ISBN 978-3-87328-012-0
- Einführung in die musikalische Romantik, (Taschenbücher zur Mw. XLIX), Wilhelmshaven 1983
- Robert Schumanns Klavierwerke, Neue biographische und textkritische Untersuchungen, Teil II (= Quellenkat. zur Mg. 10A), Wilhelmshaven 1984
- Geschichte der Motette (Wege der Forschung, vol.. 268, Darmstadt 1989), 2nd ed., erg. Neuausgabe Noetzel, Wilhelmshaven 2000
