= Caroline Schuch =

Caroline Schuch (1739–1787), was a German actress and theater director. She was married to the actor and theater director Franz Schuch (1741–1771) and managed the Stadttheater Königsberg after him in 1771–1787, while touring the Kingdom of Prussia during the summers. Alongside her husband, she dominated the theater stage in the eastern part of the Kingdom of Prussia in the second half of the 18th-century and with him referred to as one of the most noted actors of her time.
