= Johannes Boese =

German sculptor and art professor

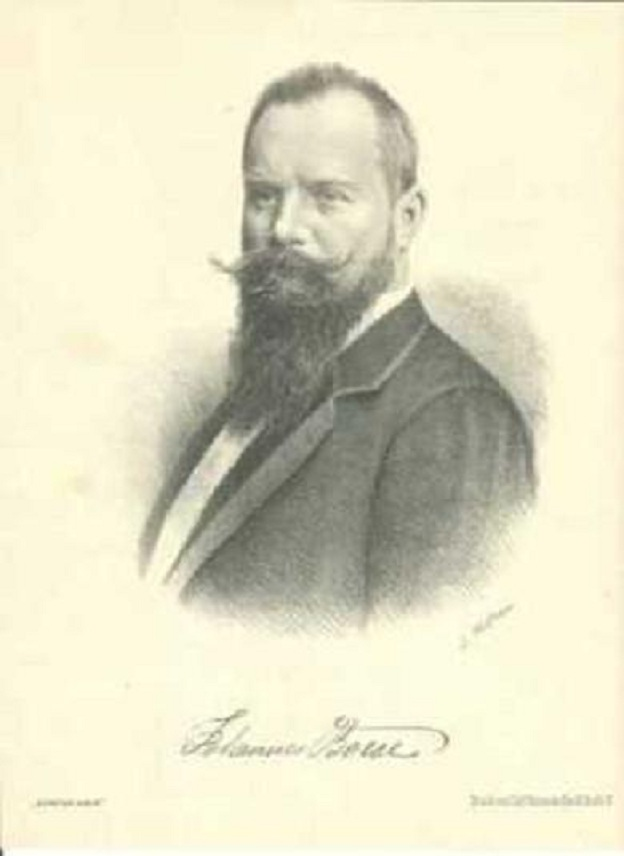
Johannes Boese (c. 1900)

Johannes Boese (27 December 1856, Ostrog (near Ratibor) – 20 April 1917, Berlin), also spelled Böse, was a German sculptor and art professor.

== Life and work ==
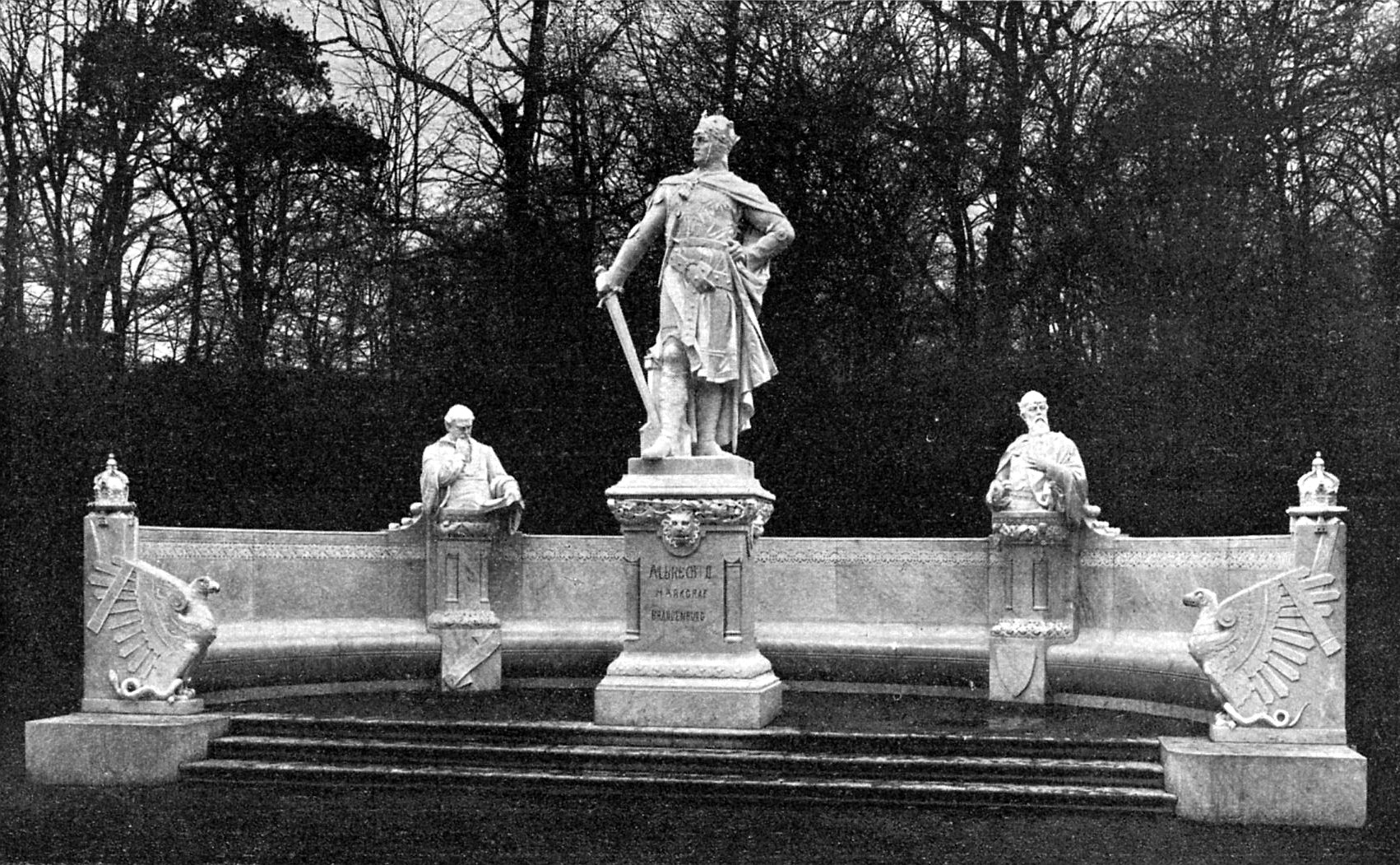
Siegesallee Group 4

Boese was originally trained as a wood carver, then attended the vocational school in Gleiwitz. In 1877, he enrolled at the Prussian Academy of Arts where he studied sculpture with Fritz Schaper. After five years, he joined the Master Class taught by Albert Wolff.

However, Boese's true wish was to become an architect and he attempted to approach that goal by providing small sculptures for building projects. He clung to that goal even when his statue "Narcissus" won a medal at the Melbourne Centennial Exhibition in 1888. It wasn't until the early 1890s that, swayed by public recognition and several more awards, Biese decided to devote himself to monumental sculptures.

In 1887, he had created a small figure called "Kaiser Wilhelm I with a Magnifying Glass" that attracted the attention and, eventually, the patronage of Kaiser Wilhelm II. When applications were being taken for work on the Siegesallee (Victory Avenue) project, Boese received a commission without going through the selection process. He produced Group 4, consisting of Albert II, Margrave of Brandenburg as the central figure, flanked by Eike von Repgow (compiler of the Sachsenspiegel) and Hermann von Salza (fourth Grand Master of the Teutonic Knights). The figures were severely damaged in World War II and are currently at the Spandau Citadel.

In 1902, Boese's monument to Kaiser Friedrich III in Posen gained him a professorship at the Academy. He was a member of several professional and cultural organizations, including the "Society for the History of Berlin" and the "Association of Berlin Artists". He was later awarded the Order of the Red Eagle (fourth class).

== Other selected major projects ==
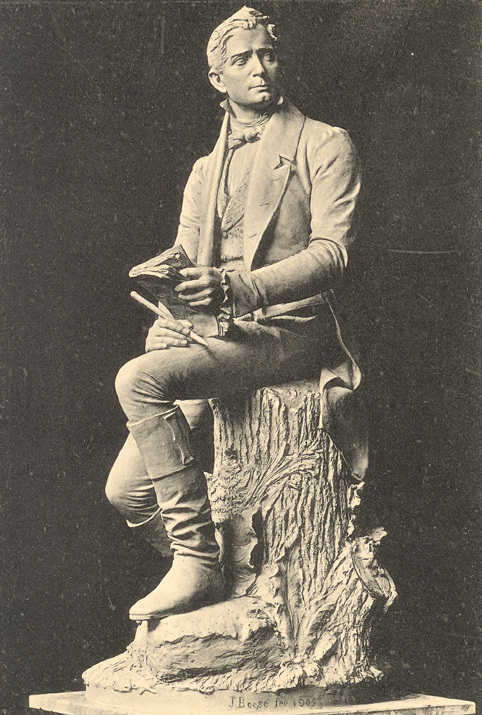
The Joseph von Eichendorff Monument (recently restored)

- 1888 Rixdorf, War memorial in the Columbiadamm Cemetery.
- 1894/95 Mitte (Berlin), Statue of Friedrich I, currently in the Neues Palais, Potsdam
- 1897/98 Liegnitz, Equestrian statue of Kaiser Wilhelm I, Breslauer Platz. (destroyed in 1945)
- 1900 Wuppertal, statue of Wilhelm I in the Barmer Ruhmeshalle.
- 1909 Ratibor, Seated statue of Joseph von Eichendorff.
- 1910 Sigmaringen, Equestrian statue of Leopold, Prince of Hohenzollern, in the Leopoldsplatz
- 1916 Kreuzberg (Berlin), Grave memorial for the actress Anna Schramm in the Friedhof der Jerusalem und Neuen Kirche.
