= Joseph von Eichendorff Monument =

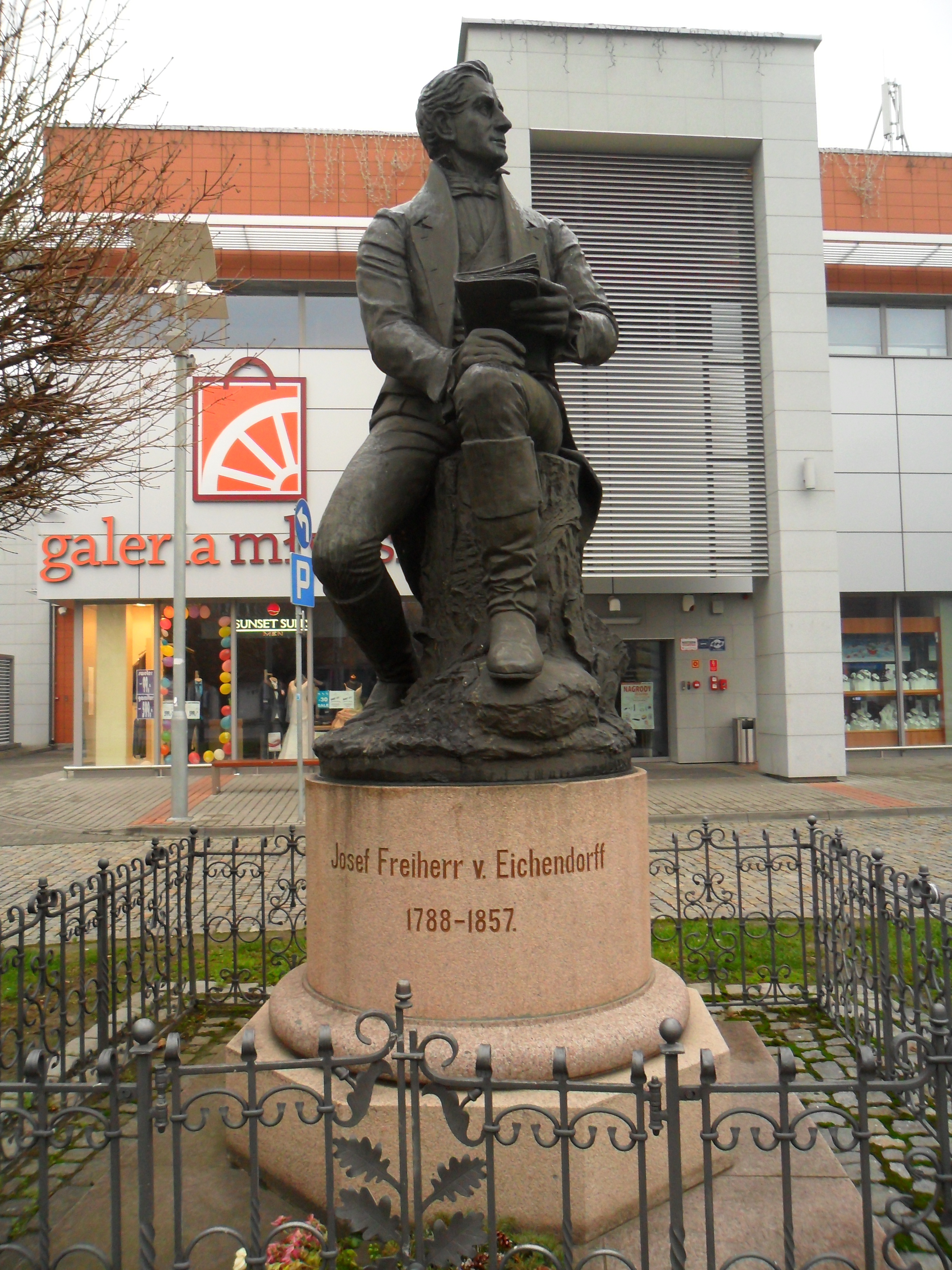
- Interactive map of Joseph von Eichendorff Monument
- Location: Racibórz, Poland
- Coordinates: 50°5′28″N 18°13′21″E
- Material: bronze
- Height: 245 cm (410 cm including the pedestal)
- Opening date: 1909 (original); 1994 (replica)

The Joseph von Eichendorff Monument is located near the intersection of Młyńska and Mickiewicz streets in Racibórz (in front of the Młyńska Gallery, on the former Zborowy Square). It is a monument to the famous German Romantic poet associated with the Racibórz region, Joseph Freiherr von Eichendorff. The current monument, unveiled in 1994, is a replica of the original unveiled in 1909, which went missing after World War II.

== Joseph von Eichendorff ==
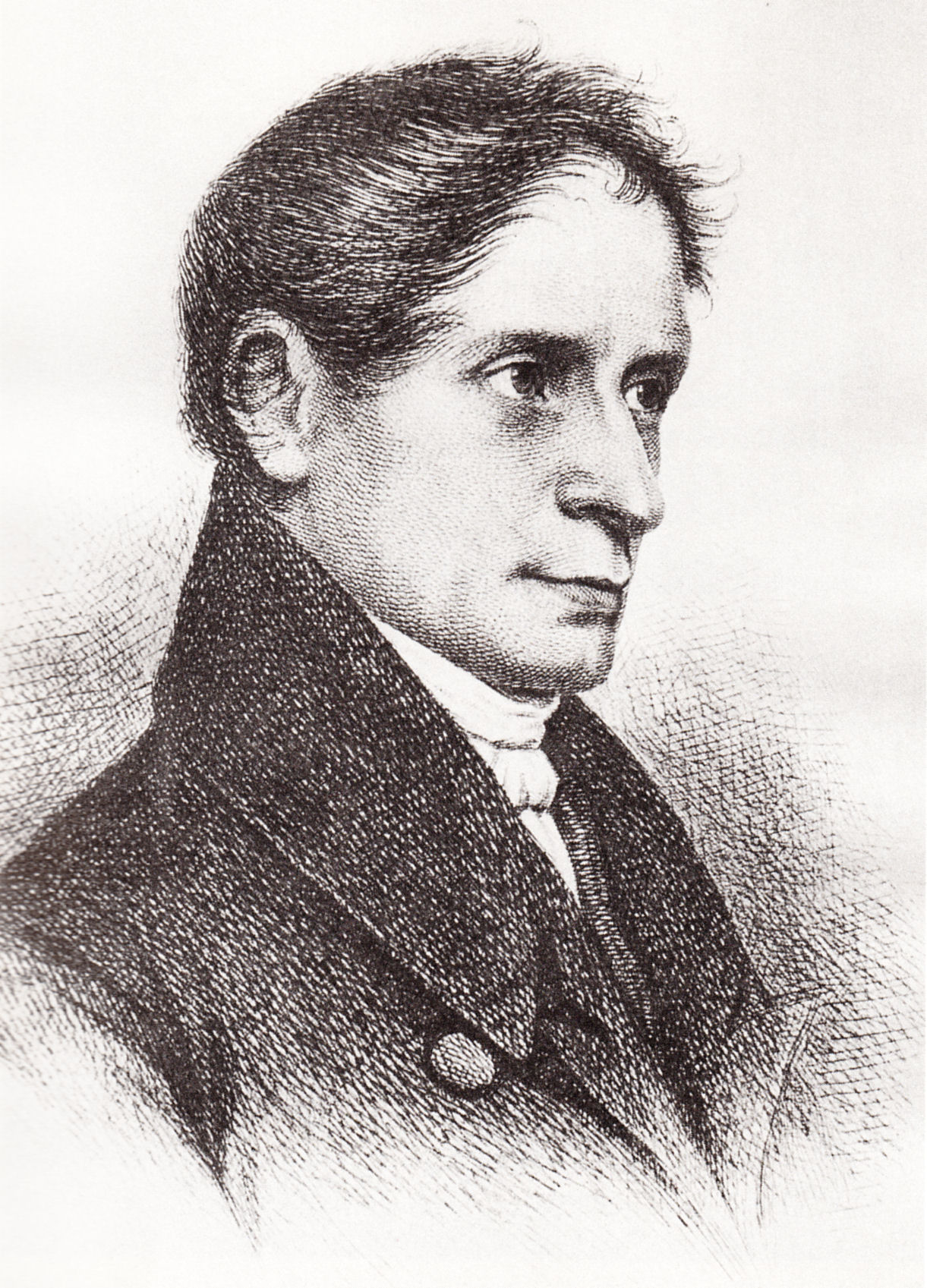
Joseph Freiherr von Eichendorff

Joseph Freiherr von Eichendorff was one of the most prominent representatives of German Romanticism. The poet left behind 608 poems, 3 epic poems, 9 plays, 13 novellas and short stories, and one novel. Eichendorff's works are characterized by descriptions of nature, remembered from his carefree childhood spent in the Racibórz region, which profoundly influenced his work, often referencing his homeland. Political reasons (the effort to erase all traces of German culture and the history of Silesia) led to Eichendorff being long ignored in his native land after World War II. It wasn't until the 200th anniversary of his birth on 10 March 1988 that this began to change. During a mass in Łubowice, prayers were said for the poet, and in front of the ruins of his family palace, Eichendorff's poems were recited. This evening is considered the awakening of the "cult" of Eichendorff. One manifestation of this was the restoration of the described monument in 1994, and the days around the anniversary of September 4, when the monument was unveiled, are celebrated annually in Racibórz as "Eichendorff Days".

== History ==
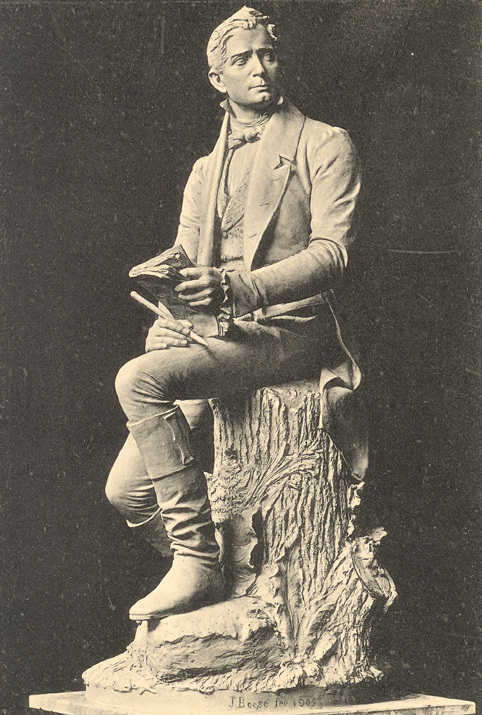
1909 postcard with a photograph of the monument

The initiative to build a monument for Eichendorff came from the Liedertafel Singing Society, which decided to honor its 75th anniversary and the 50th anniversary of the poet's death, which fell in 1907, in this way. Funds for this purpose were sought from about 9,000 singing associations throughout Germany, of which around 800 responded to the appeal. A total amount of 8,000 Deutsche Marks was collected, and the missing 4,000 was covered from the city treasury and thanks to a subsidy from the government of the Province of Silesia.

The location of the monument initially sparked disputes. The Singing Society believed that a worthy place for its display was Zborowy Square, in front of the now non-existent county building, on what was then Dworcowa Street (now Mickiewicz Street). The city authorities, however, proposed the square in front of the St. Notburg institution (today's Jagiełło Square), believing that the location indicated by the committee would be a good site for another lofty monument of a state character. The authorities, along with then-mayor August Bernert, initially firmly opposed the project of placing the Eichendorff monument in front of the county office; eventually, the society resorted to blackmail, threatening that if the city did not agree to the proposed location, the monument would be built in one of the other cities associated with the poet. Ultimately, the city agreed to the committee's conditions, and the project could proceed. The creation of the poet's likeness was entrusted to Johannes Boese of Ostróg, a professor at the Berlin Academy of Arts.

The unveiling took place on Sunday, 26 September 1909. The day before, a ceremonial meeting was held on this occasion in the new Racibórz concert hall Tivoli. On the day of the unveiling, the celebrations began with a morning concert, followed by a procession at 1:30 PM from Polko-Platz (now Freedom Square), involving choirs, craft guilds, merchant guilds, shooting fraternities, about 400 school children, and two orchestras. The participants marched through Długa Street, the market square, Nowa Street, Drzymała Strret, and Mickiewicz Street, to the county office building. After speeches were delivered in the presence of thousands of residents, the monument was unveiled, and the mayor officially took it under the city's care.

In 1945, after the Red Army entered Racibórz, the original monument was removed from its pedestal and disappeared without a trace. The pedestal itself survived for many more years, but eventually, it too disappeared. At the end of the 20th century, efforts were made to locate the monument, but they were unsuccessful. Finally, the City Council, at the request of German minority councilors, passed a resolution to re-situate the monument. This task was undertaken by the board of the Social-Cultural Society of Germans of the Silesian Voivodeship. The first meeting took place in April 1993. The creation of the monument model was entrusted to Georg Latton, a sculptor from Krzanowice. The monument was cast by the Gliwice Technical Devices Plant. In the meantime, fragments of the missing pedestal were found.

On 4 September 1994, the rebuilt monument was ceremoniously unveiled in its original location. The ceremony was preceded by a bilingual concelebration at the parish church. After the service, participants proceeded to the monument. The event, which gathered a considerable number of attendees, was highlighted by choir performances and speeches from municipal officials and invited guests. The symbolic cutting of two ribbons – in the colors of the Polish and German flags – was performed by then-Mayor Andrzej Markowiak and Duke Franz-Albrecht Metternich-Sándor.

== Description ==
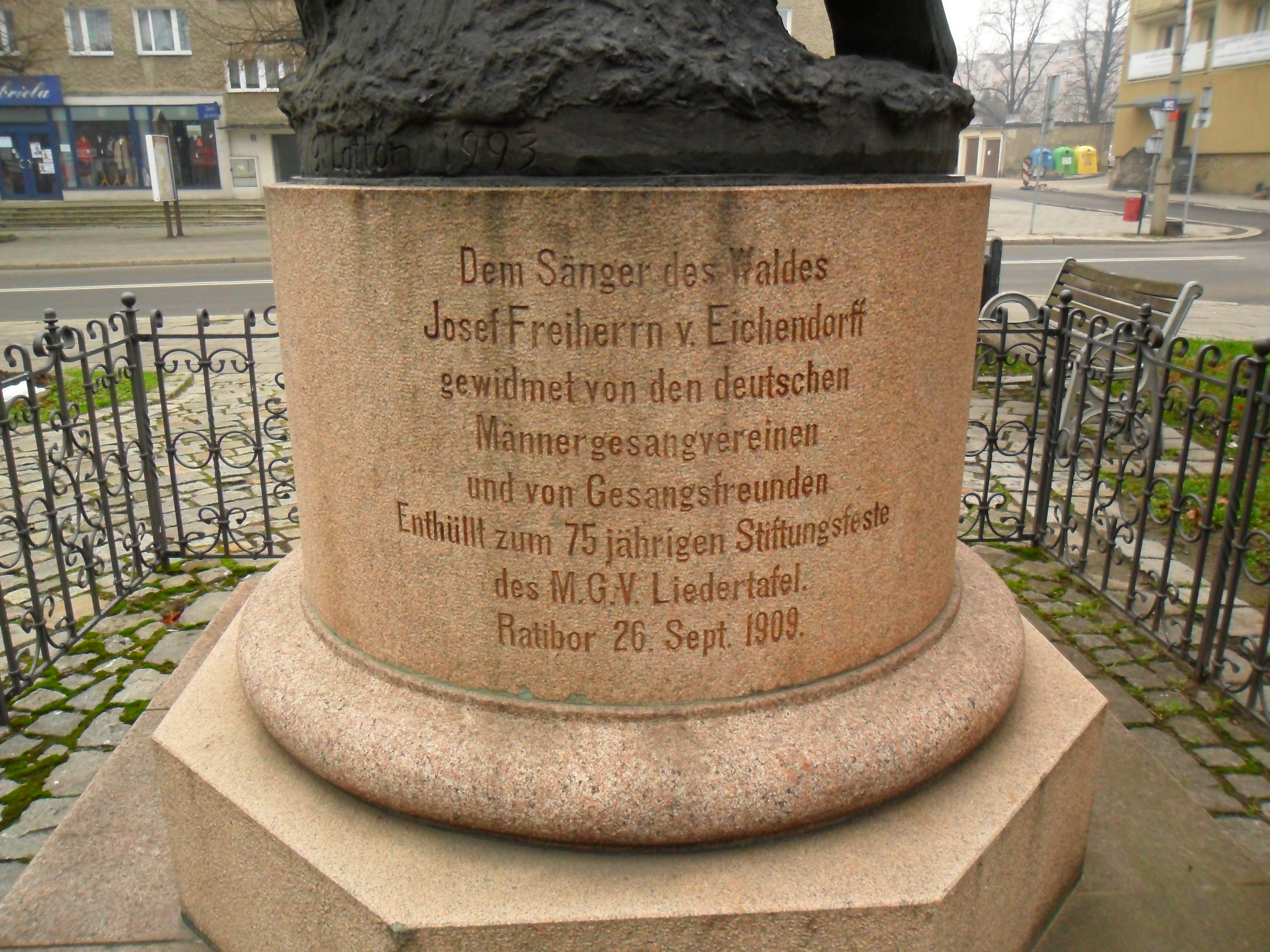
Inscription on the back of the pedestal

The monument depicts the poet sitting on an oak stump (a reference to the poet's name – Eiche means oak in German), holding a closed notebook in his left hand and a pencil in his right. It was cast in bronze at the Gliwice Technical Devices Plant. The statue stands 245 cm tall and is mounted on a red granite pedestal, surrounded by a small metal fence. Including the pedestal, it measures 410 cm in height. The pedestal (which is also a copy of the original) bears the inscription: Josef Freiherr v. Eichendorff 1788–1857 (English: Baron Josef von Eichendorff 1788–1857), and on the back, there is a dedication: Dem Sänger des Waldes Josef von Eichendorff gewidmet von den deutschen Männergesangvereinen und von Gesangsfreunden. Enthüllt zum 75-jährigen Stiftungsfeste des M.G.V. Liedertafel Ratibor, 26. Sept. 1909 (English: To the Singer of the Forest Josef von Eichendorff, dedicated by the German men's singing societies and friends of song. Unveiled on the occasion of the 75th anniversary of the Men's Singing Society 'Liedertafel'. Racibórz, September 26, 1909). On the side, at the base of the sculpture, the inscription reads: J. Boese 1909 Kopie G. Latton 1993.

The monument is located in the very center of Racibórz, near the intersection of Młyńska and Mickiewicz streets, on the former Zborowy Square, roughly halfway between the Racibórz railway station and the market square. Just behind the monument stands the Młyńska Gallery, which opened in 2008.

This monument is not the only one of its kind. Monuments to the German Romantic poet can also be found in Brzezie, Königswinter, Dębowiec, Nysa, Rudy, and in Szczytnicki Park in Wrocław (only the pedestal remains there). Numerous commemorative plaques exist, and many streets and schools are named after him, as well as commemorative stamps and coins honoring the poet. In Łubowice, there is a memorial room dedicated to the poet.

== Bibliography ==
- Newerla, Paweł (1995). Opowieści o dawnym Raciborzu (in Polish). Racibórz: Towarzystwo Miłośników Ziemi Raciborskiej.
- Czajkowski, Paweł (2017-12-29). "Pamięć i zapominanie w społecznościach lokalnych na przykładzie stosunku do miejsc pamięci w Dzierżoniowie i Raciborzu". Rocznik Ziem Zachodnich (in Polish). 1: 504–528. doi:10.26774/rzz.181. ISSN 2544-8714.
