= Friedrich Tietz =

German theatre director and writer

Friedrich Tietz (24 September 1803 – 6 July 1879) sometimes incorrectly called Friedrich von Tietz, was a German theatre director, publicist and writer.

== Life and career ==
Born in Königsberg, Tietz first studied law and worked as a legal trainee in the Prussian judicial service in Berlin. He was to give detailed accounts of these youthful years in several of his later books of memoirs. In 1829, however, he gave up his legal career and moved to Dresden to devote himself entirely to writing. He had already emerged in Berlin as an author of locally related comedy plays (1828: Die Theatralische Landparthie, 1829: Die Comödie in Zehlendorf). Already on 3 December 1827, his Schwank Englischer Spleen, oder: Die Geliebte in der Einbildung, a one-act play, was performed in Berlin, and further performances then followed until September 1828. During the same period, Tietz also published several stories and a volume of poetry.

=== 1829–1842: Writing, travels and scandals ===
In 1830, Tietz was appointed Legation Councillor by Duke of Saxe-Coburg and Gotha, and in the following years he spent time in Russia in this capacity (1832–33). A little later he also undertook a journey to the eastern Mediterranean (Turkey, Aegean, Greece), by land via Bucharest (December 1833). At the beginning of 1834 he then stayed in Constantinople, then in Nafplio; in the eastern Aegean he had visited several islands. But Russia remained his most important experience for Tietz. During his stay there, he had improved his knowledge of the Russian language to such an extent that he now also ventured into literary translations, which appeared in 1838. Already after the suppression of the Uprising in Poland (1830–31) by Russia, which brought the Poles much sympathy among German national liberals, Tietz had positioned himself entirely pro-Russian. In 1830, under the pseudonym "Fedor Ivanowitsch", he wrote the pro-Russian pamphlet – actually a poem – Worte eines Russen an die Deutschen.

There are numerous files from the unstable 1830s in Tietz's life, which were created due to various activities on his part; it is not always possible to give precise details, as no one has yet analysed the material. The Saxon State Archives, for example, has records of an "investigation against the Coburg Legation Councillor Johann Friedrich Tietz for involvement in the riots", specifically in the riots in Dresden in April 1831. What had occurred and what emerged from this investigation will have to be revealed by a future inspection of the files, especially as there are still other documents available. In any case, Tietz continued to work as a legation councillor for several years thereafter, although he now seems to have lived in Munich rather than Dresden. In 1835, incidentally, Tietz had obtained employment "on a trial basis" at the herzogliches Hoftheater in Coburg, but had been dismissed again after a short time "because of unsuitable behaviour in business".

==== The Gloria affair ====
Tietz was again on record in 1836, and the Coburg State Archives preserve a report on the "blackmail attempt by the journalist Friedrich Tietz against the Coburg government in connection with the marriage between Queen Gloria II and Prince Ferdinand". We know quite a lot about this incident because contemporary newspapers took notice and reported on it in detail.

The following had happened: After the unexpectedly early death of her first husband Auguste de Beauharnais, the Portuguese Queen Maria II of Portugal, daughter of the Emperor of Brazil, had married a 19-year-old prince from the House of Saxe-Coburg and Gotha, Ferdinand, on 9 April 1836. The Augsburg Allgemeine Zeitung then published in its extraordinary supplement No. 453-54 (of 28 September) a private letter from Lisbon dated mid-July, in which not only the Portuguese and their queen, but also in particular the Coburg prince Ferdinand, were portrayed in a very bad light, even made fun of. Now, as is reported, Tietz had knowledge of the letter long before it was published and sent the contents from Munich to a state official in Gotha as early as June, adding that the contents would be "brought to the public's attention after the expiration of 14 days by one of the most excellent newspapers", if the ducal government did not show any gratitude towards him. He was presumably referring to his dismissal from the court theatre (1835), and in this way attempted to secure his reinstatement. However, nothing came of it. The ducal government denounced him, and Ernst I withdrew "the predicate of a ducal councillor of legation issued on 2 October 1830". It was generally assumed that the "private letter from Lisbon" published in the Augsburger Zeitung had actually been written by Tietz himself for the purpose of blackmail. Without a doubt, Tietz possessed sufficient information about the conditions in Portugal, especially since three years later he also published a study on the contemporary Brazil – at that time an independent empire, but still closely connected to the Portuguese ruling house.

=== 1842–1853: Theatre director ===
At the beginning of the 1840s, Tietz initially lived in Rostock, but on 1 February 1842 he took over as director of the Stadttheater Königsberg, and did so "on his own account". The theatre was financially and artistically run down when Tietz took over. Tietz managed to bring some stars of the time to Königsberg, such as the famous opera singer Wilhelmine Schröder-Devrient, and concerts by Franz Liszt were also sold out. However, this was apparently not enough to put the ailing house on a firm financial footing. There was not, as elsewhere, a sovereign in Königsberg to act as a patron, and sometimes plays that were on the programme could not be performed "for lack of audience". In September 1844, Tietz therefore gave up the post again, although he remained on friendly terms with the Königsberg theatre.

From 1844 to 1852 he worked as director at other theatres, first in Reval (from where he also co-directed the theatre in Helsinki, 1845–46), then in Altonaer Theater. During this period he also resumed his activity as an author of comedy plays and jokes, which he continued until the 1870s. Almost all of his plays were taken from older, mostly French originals or adapted from them. In addition, he paid special attention to ballet, "which had in him an exact connoisseur and an almost rapturous admirer".

=== From 1853: The Berlin Years ===
In 1853, Tietz finally settled in Berlin and began a 25-year career as a publicist, playwright and author; at times he also wrote for the Berlin Vossische Zeitung. From 1853 onwards, Tietz also bore the official title of Saxe-Coburg-Gotha Court Commission Councillor. Apparently, by this time the Gloria Affair of 1836 had been sufficiently forgotten so that Tietz could now once again enjoy a ducal title, especially since the old Duke of Saxe-Coburg and Gotha, Ernst I, had meanwhile been deceased for almost ten years.

From autumn 1853 to 1854, however, Tietz was on the road again, and for the last time in the Orient. From Trieste, he went via Izmir to Constantinople to report on the Crimean War. Unlike his earlier travels in the Ottoman Empire, however, he did not write a book about this journey. It seems that after his return, his activities as a publicist and playwright in New Berlin kept him too busy to find time to publish his experiences in book form, and his Colourful Memoirs, which made him a minor celebrity in Berlin, appeared as early as 1854. In them, he tells mainly of his early Berlin days, with a few memories from Russia in the 1830s sprinkled in.

In the years between 1854 and 1874, Tietz published numerous other stage plays or adaptations or translations of older comedy plays, but also repeatedly biographies and "memory books" of various kinds, whether of his own experiences or of acquaintances with third parties. Because of his productivity as an author, a Berlin feature writer in 1866 called him "a personality well known as a literary industrialist." Five years later, another correspondent reported on the festive performances and declamations given in Berlin for the birthday of Kaiserin that they were "mostly by Friedrich Tietz", "an enduring old gentleman who exploits with skill for such patriotic outpourings all the old musenal manache from this and the previous century."

Tietz was married to Anna Brandstaedter. His son was the theatre actor Josef Tietz (1830–1906). Tietz died at the age of 75 in his flat at Luisenstraße 51 in Berlin.

== Work ==
=== Travel narratives, memoirs and related literature ===
==== Books ====
- 1836: Erinnerungs-Skizzen aus Rußland, der Türkei und Griechenland. Entworfen während eine Aufenthalts in jenen Ländern in den Jahren 1833 und 1834 vom Legationsrath Tietz
  - Part I: Coburg und Leipzig: Sinner'sche Hof-Buchhandlung (Google)
  - Part II: Coburg und Leipzig: Sinner'sche Hof-Buchhandlung (Google)
  - English edition in two volumes 1836: St. Petersburgh, Constantinople, and Napoli di Romania, in 1833 and 1834: A Characteristic Picture, Drawn During a Residence There. By M. von Tietz, Prussian Counsellor of Legation, London: Adolphus Richter and Co. (Google: Band I – Band II)
  - Amerikanische Ausgabe 1836: St. Petersburgh, Constantinople, and Napoli di Romania, in 1833 and 1834: A Characteristic Picture, Drawn During a Residence There. By M. von Tietz, Prussian Counsellor of Legation, New York: Theodore Foster (Google)
- 1838: Bunte Skizzen aus Ost und Süd. Entworfen und gesammelt in Preußen, Rußland, der Türkei, Griechenland, auf den ionischen Inseln und in Italien, 2 Bände, Leipzig: F.A. Brockhaus (Google)
- 1839: Brasilianische Zustände. Nach gesandschaftlichen Berichten bis zum Jahre 1837, Berlin: Voß'sche Buchhandlung
- 1854: Bunte Erinnerungen an Persönlichkeiten, Begebenheiten und Theaterzustände. Zusammengesucht von Fr. Tietz, Berlin: Leopold Lassar (Google)
- 1860: Nach Rußland und zurück.
- 1866: Marie Taglioni. Erinnerungsblätter aus dem Leben der Künstlerin, Berlin: Ernst Litfaß (Google)
- 1868: Haidekraut und Riedgras. Märkisch-Preußische Historietten aus alten Tagen, Breslau: Eduard Trewendt (Google)
  - Niederländische Ausgabe 1870: Heidekrud en rietgras. Markensch-Pruisische geschiedenissen uit de oude doos, Leiden: P. Engels (Google)
- 1868: Wien. Diabolische und menschliche Photographien. Fixirt von Fr. Tietz, Berlin: Hausfreund-Expedition (E. Graetz) (Google)
- 1871: Ernst Litfass' industrielle und private Wirksamkeit. Zur Feier seines 25 jährigen Principals- und Bürger-Jubiläums nach authentischen Thatsachen dargestellt. Nachdruck der Original-Festschrift aus dem Jahre 1871, Berlin (Google)
- 1873: Wien bei Tag und Nacht. Culturbilder, Berlin: J. Josowicz (Google)
  - Niederländische Ausgabe 1874: Weenen bij dag en bij nacht. Naar het hoogduitsch, Zwolle: Van Hoogstraten & Gorter (Google)

==== Articles in magazines ====
- 1840: „Griechisch-Türkische Reiseskizzen"
  - Part 1: Wanderung durch Athen, Das Ausland, Nr. 189 (7 July 1840), pp. 753–755; Nr. 190 (8 July 1840), pp. 758 f.
  - Part 2: Fahrt von Athen nach Chios, Das Ausland, Nr. 196 (14 July 1840), pp. 781 f.; Nr. 197 (15 July 1840), S. 786 f.
  - Part 3: Kostaki Lambros, die Waise von Chios, Das Ausland, Nr. 199 (17. Juli 1840), pp. 793 f.; Nr. 200 (18 July 1840), pp. 798 f.; Nr. 201 (19 July 1840), pp. 802 f.
  - Part 4: Aufenthalt in der Stadt Chios – Die Chiotinnen und die Chioten, Das Ausland, Nr. 202 (20. Juli 1840), pp. 805–807; Nr. 203 (21. Juli 1840), pp. 810 f.
  - Part 5: Ausflug zum Kloster Neamoni, Das Ausland, Nr. 206 (24. Juli 1840), pp. 821 f.; Nr. 207 (25 July 1840), pp. 826 f.; Nr. 208 (26 July 1840), pp. 830 f.
  - Part 6: Ausflüge nach Homers Schule und Mastico – Abreise von Chios, Das Ausland, Nr. 209 (27 July 1840), pp. 833–835; Nr. 210 (28 July 1840), pp. 838 f.
- 1851: „Über die Musik in der Türkei", in: Neue Berliner Musikzeitung, Nr. 35, 27 August 1851, pp. 275–277.
- 1861: „Ein Besuch beim Pascha von Smyrna und ein griechischer Räuberhauptmann. Erinnerungen von Friedrich Tietz". in Der Zwischen-Akt (Vienna), Nr. 64, 6 March 1861, p. 2 f. (not paginated) (ANNO)
- 1872: Mein Brite und sein Spleen, in Deutscher Volkskalender für 1872, 28. Jahrgang, Breslau: E. Trewendt
- 1874: Aus dem Leben einer todten berühmten Künstlerin. Jugenderinnerungen aus dem ersten Drittel dieses Jahrhunderts. Skizzirt von Friedrich Tietz, in Über Land und Meer, Nr. 22 (1874), pp. 431–435 (Online BSB Munich)

=== Literary and political writings ===
- 1830 (as Fedor Ivanowitsch): Worte eines Russen an die Deutschen. Zur Erinnerung an die vergangene und jetzige Zeit, o.–O. Second edition Danzig: Gerhard 1832
- 1834: Erzählungen und Phantasiestücke. With a foreword by Friedrich de la Motte Fouqué, Leipzig: Böhme

=== Translations ===
- 1838: Historische und romantische Erzählungen, Begebenheiten und Skizzen. Nach dem Russischen des A. Puschkin, A. Bestushew, T. Bulgarin und Anderer deutsch herausgegeben von Friedrich Tietz, Berlin: Voß'sche Buchhandlung (Google)

=== Stage works ===
- 1839: Je toller, desto besser! Eine Sammlung heiterer, leicht ausführbarer Polterabendscherze. F.H. Morin, Berlin (Google)
- 1851: Nur diplomatisch! Lustspiel in 5 Aufzügen, frei nach dem Französischen. (Nach der Einrichtung des Regisseurs, Herrn Ascher, zur Aufführung im Friedrich-Wilhelmstädtischen Theater zu Berlin, 29 October 1851). E. Litfaß, Berlin (Google) (BSB Munich)
- 1852: Im Asyl. Lustspiel in einem Akt, frei nach dem Französischen. Louis Kolbe, Berlin (Google)
- 1852: Närrische Leute. Vaudeville-Burleske in 1 Akt. Mit theilweiser Benutzung eines alten französischen Stoffes (Zum Erstenmale dargestellt auf dem Friedrich-Wilhelmstädtischen Theater zu Berlin am 5 März 1852). L. Kolb, Berline (Google) – Erneut veröffentlicht 1859 (see below)
- 1853: Nur nicht ängstlich! Lustspiel in vier Aufzügen. (Mit theilweiser Benutzung eines älteren Stoffes). Berlin (Google)
- 1855: Aus der alten guten Zeit. Königsberger Lebensbilder in vier Abtheilungen, Königsberg (eine Komödie)
- 1855: Die gute alte Zeit, oder: Das alte Berlin. Schwank aus der ersten Hälfte der vorigen Jahrhunderts, in vier Abtheilungen, Theaterzettel vom Hoftheater Weimar, 27 December 1855 (Thüringisches Hauptstaatsarchiv Weimar)
- 1855: Ein Theater-Abend vor hundert Jahren. Novellistische Erinnerungs-Scizze an den 24. November 1755 zum hundertjährigen Jubiläum des Königsberger Stadttheaters. Schultzsche Hofdruckerei, Königsberg (Numerized ULB Münster) (Google)
- 1856: Eine Braut auf Lieferung. Lustspiel in vier Aufzügen, neu nach dem Italienischen des Federici. (Mit enschiedenstem Erfolge auf der Friedr.-Wilhelmstädt. Bühne in Berlin aufgeführt). L. Kolbe, Berlin (Google)
- 1857: Argwöhnische Eheleute. Lustspiel in 4 Akten nach Kotzebue, neu bearbeitet (Am Königl. Hoftheater in Berlin mit entschiedenstem Beifall gegeben). L. Kolbe, Berlin (Numerized ULB Münster)
- 1858: Der Herr Inspector. Lustspiel in vier Akten (Die Handlung theilweise nach einem älteren Stoffe), Berlin: L. Kolbe (Numerized ULB Münster)
- 1859: Der Fürst und sein Dichter. Vaterländisches Neujahrs-Dramolett in einem Akt. L. Kolbe, Berlin (Numerized ULB Münster)
- 1859 (co-author): Der Müller von Meran. Romantisch-komische Oper in drei Akten von Mosenthal und Friedr. Tietz. Musik von F. v. Flotow. L. Kolbe, Berlin (Google)
- 1859: Närrische Leute. Vaudeville-Burleske in 1 Akt, mit theilweiser Benutzung eines alten Französischen Stoffes. A.W. Hayn, Berlin (Numerized ULB Münster) (Google) – Zuerst veröffentlicht 1852 (see above )
- 1860: Ein Verschwörer. Intriguenstück in 4 Akten und 1 Vorspiel nach dem Französischen des Alexander Dumas
- 1862: Dunkle Wolken. Dramatische Kleinigkeit in 1 Akt, nach einer Idee des Fournier. (Aufgeführt im Königlichen Hoftheater zu München). A.W. Hayn, Berlin (Numerized ULB Münster)
- 1862: Couplets aus der Posse: Die Götter in der Hasenheide, oder: Berliner im Olymp. Nach F. Tietz von E. Jacobson und R. Linderer. Eduard Bloch, Berlin (BSB Muich)
- 1864: Alle verheirathet, oder: Ein Ring. (Zweiter Teil des Lustspiel's: Nur nicht heirathen!) Comedy in 4 acts based on the English Sir Harry Wildair by Farguhar und der Schröder'schen Übersetzung bearbeitet. L. Kolbe, Berlin (Numerized ULB Münster)
- 1864: Nur nicht heirathen! oder: Ein Ring. Lustspiel in fünf Akten, nach dem englischen Original Constant couple von Farqhuar und der Schröder'schen Übersetzung bearbeitet. L. Kolbe, Berlin (Numerized on ULB Münster)
- 1865 (not exactly dated): Berliner im Olymp. Burleske mit Gesang und Tanz in 3 Akten, nebst Vorspiel und scenischem Prolog. Couplets von R. Linderer. Musik von G. Michaelis. Bühnen-Manuskripten-Verlag von Eduard Bloch, Berlin (BSB Munich)
- 1867: Er ist kurirt. Schwank in einem Akt, after the French Un mari dans du coton (performed in the Wallner-Theater zu Berlin). A.W. Hayns Erben, Berlin (Numerized ULB Münster)
- 1867: Großmütterchen und Enkel. Lustspiel in 1 Akt mit Gesang nach dem Französischen. A.W. Hayns Erben, Berlin (Google)
