= Wolfgang Osthoff =

German musicologist

Wolfgang Osthoff (17 March 1927 – 29 July 2008) was a German musicologist and professor (ordinarius) for historical musicology at the University of Würzburg.

== Life ==
Born in Halle as son of the musicologist Helmuth Osthoff, Osthoff received his musical education from Kurt Hessenberg (sound composition) and Kurt Thomas (conducting) in Frankfurt. He studied musicology with his father and with Thrasybulos Georgiades, from whom he received his doctorate after studying in Frankfurt and Heidelberg in 1954 and with whom he habilitated in Munich in 1965. Studies in philosophy (among others with Hans-Georg Gadamer) and Middle Latin enabled him to understand music in a comprehensive context. His two-year study stay in Italy from 1955 to 1957 consolidated his love of Italian music. From 1968 to 1995 he was full professor of musicology at the Julius-Maximilians-University of Würzburg. Even after his retirement, he continued to teach at the Musicological Institute until his retirement.

Osthoff was active in national and international scientific societies and academies; for over a quarter of a century he was responsible for musicology at the Sapienza University of Rome. He also participated in projects of the Music History Commission of the Bavarian Academy of Sciences in Munich. He was a member of the presidency of the Hans Pfitzner Society, a scientific member or on the advisory board of the German Study Centre in Venice, the Istituto Nazionale di Studi Verdiani Parma, the Beethoven House in Bonn, the Music History Commission of the Bavarian Academy of Sciences and Humanities and the Stefan George Society in Bingen. The Sapienza University of Rome awarded him the dignity of Honorary degree.

Osthoff died in Würzburg at age 85.

== Work ==
The main fields of work of this scholar with a wide range of scientific expertise were Italian music of the 15th to 19th centuries, in particular the work of Claudio Monteverdi and Giuseppe Verdi, Viennese Classicism with a focus on Ludwig van Beethoven and the music of the first half of the 20th century. Here he paid special attention to the works of Hans Pfitzner and Gerhard Frommel, with whom he had a deep friendship. In his reflections on the relationship between music and language, the work of Stefan George was of outstanding importance to him.
