= Max Brode =

German violinist and conductor

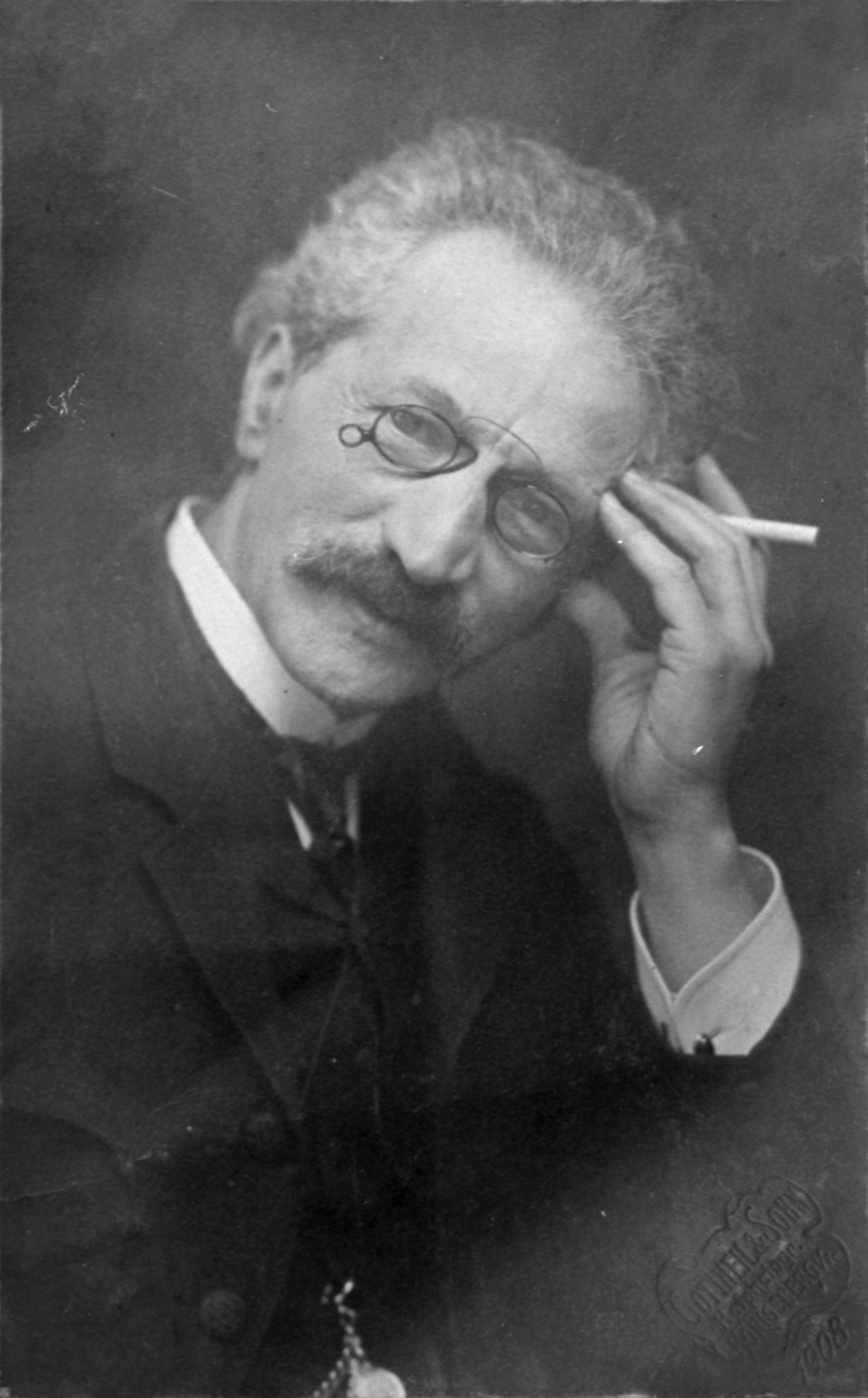
Max Brode

Max Brode (25 February 1850 – 29 December 1917) was a German violinist and conductor. He shaped the music life of East Prussia's provincial capital for over 41 years.

== Life ==
Born in Berlin as the youngest son into a simple Jewish family, Brode was taught to play the violin at an early age by his father. Among his teachers was Heinrich de Ahna. Paul Mendelssohn-Bartholdy took Brode into his care and sent him to Ferdinand David, the concertmaster of the Gewandhaus in Leipzig. There he played music with Franz Liszt and the singer George Henschel, who became a lifelong friend.

After graduating, at the age of 19, he accepted an engagement as primarius of a private string quartet in kurland Mitau. For a long time he lived in the house of Reinhold von Lüdinghausen. When Anton Rubinstein heard him there, he advised Brode against a concertmaster position at the Mariinsky Theatre in St Petersburg. He recommended him to Joseph Joachim, who had come to the Stern Conservatory in 1866 and had become Rector of the Berlin University of the Arts in 1869. At the end of his life (1907), Joachim considered Brode the best student he had ever had. At the end of the four-year course, Brode shone with Joachim's "unplayable" Violin Concerto in D minor op. 11 in the Hungarian style Concerts in Aachen, Augsburg, Vienna, Stuttgart and Frankfurt made Brode famous. In Vienna, Johannes Brahms was moved by Brode's personal prelude.

Against Joachim's advice, Brode accepted a position as first violin teacher at the Augsburg music school in 1874. The Countess Fugger took him into her home and gave him an Stradivari violin. In 1876, at the age of 26, Brode joined the Stadttheater Königsberg as concertmaster. Having fallen ill with his left hand, he shifted to conducting as an autodidact. He put together a small orchestra from his pupils and cellists, in which the winds were initially replaced by four-hand piano playing. Rehearsal was held every Sunday in a small adjoining room the (new) Königsberg Stock Exchange. The small orchestral association brought great music to Königsberg for the first time.

Max Staegemann established the tradition of demanding symphony concerts in Königsberg and entrusted Brode with important soloist tasks as a violinist. When Staegemann went to Leipzig and the concerts were discontinued due to lack of popularity, Brode picked up the thread again in 1897. He concluded a contract with the theatre director for the use of the orchestra, for which he brought in musicians from the military orchestras and advanced students. He arranged with the merchant community for the use of the Stock Exchange Hall. He took care of the correspondence with foreign artists himself. He raised money from wealthy friends and patrons. Brode's concert series was opened with a Beethoven evening. None other than Joachim played the Beethoven violin concerto Beethoven op. 61. Brode's concerts were a lasting success.

After the death of music director Heinrich Laudien (1829-1891), Brode took over the Philharmonic. With the "dilettante orchestra" he successfully performed Brahms' four symphonies and the Symphony No. 9 (Beethoven).

After the University of Königsberg, Brode was appointed academic teacher of the history and theory of music in 1888, he encouraged the founding of a student Choir, of which he became the director. When he was entrusted with the Singakademie, directed by Constanz Berneker, in 1892, he was able to set about performing large choral works for the first time. When necessary, the men of the student choir reinforced the choirs of the Singakademie. He had a particularly cordial relationship with them until his death.

In the 1890s, Brode initiated regular string quartet evenings. The Brode Quartet performed for over two decades. The Wendel Quartet also played in Königsberg. He made music with Eugen d'Albert and Anton Rubinstein. Bronisław Huberman sought his advice.

Brode collected stamps, coins and antiques. He bought his last Stradivarius in Saint Petersburg from a Baron Vietinghoff for 6000 Marks - without playing it or checking its tone. The appearance alone guaranteed him authenticity and excellent quality. Towards the end of the 19th century, Joachim estimated its value at five times that amount. In his second marriage he was married to Ellida née Wittich, who stood by him faithfully until the sudden end of his life and gave him three children, Emilie, Franz, and Marie. Emilie Brode became his gifted pupil. However, she later switched to singing and after her marriage to Norbert von Stetten, became known as Emy von Stetten as an oratorio, opera and lieder singer.

Brosde died in Königsberg at the age of 67. A detailed obituary of Brode appeared on 20 January 1918 in the Sunday edition of the Königsberger Hartungsche Zeitung.

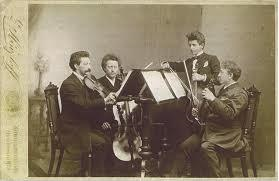
Brode Quartet
