= Hessischer Sängerbund =

Choir band in Hessen

Hessischer Sängerbund e.V.
- Abbreviation: HSB
- Purpose: Support and representation of Hessian lay choirs; musical education and youth development
- Headquarters: Wiesbaden, Germany
- Location: Office in Oberursel
- Region served: Hessen
- Members: ~1,200 associations, 2,050 choirs, ~44,000 singers
- Parent organization: Deutscher Chorverband
- Website: hessischer-saengerbund.de

The Hessische Sängerbund (HSB) is the largest choral association in Hessen. It sees itself as a contact partner and representative of the Hessian lay choirs and choral societies. It represents the interests of about 1,200 associations with 2,050 choirs and about 44,000 singers towards the public and politics. It has its headquarters in Wiesbaden, its office is located in Oberursel.

About his membership in Deutscher Chorverband (DCV), the Hessian Singers' Association is networked throughout Germany and Europe. For its members, the Hessischer Sängerbund arranges contacts in musical, organisational, legal and administrative matters. It organises concerts and competitions, choir studios, choir literature days and choir workshops. It also takes care of the work with young talents as well as musical education and further training. On behalf of the Hessian state government, the Hessian Sängerbund coordinates the Landesjugendchor Hessen, the Hessian selection choir for young singers.

The Hessischer Sängerbund trains (vice-)choir conductors and offers further training events for them. To this end, it maintains two choir conducting schools in Frankfurt and Marburg.
