= Friedrich W. Herzog =

German writer and music critic (1902–1976)

Friedrich Wilhelm Herzog
- Born: 30 March 1902; Oldenburg, German Empire
- Died: 3 November 1976; Oldenburg, West Germany
- Occupations: Writer, music critic, teacher
- Known for: Editor of Die Musik; author of Was ist deutsche Musik

Friedrich Wilhelm Herzog (30 March 1902 – 3 November 1976) was a German writer and music critic.

== Life ==
Born in Oldenburg, Herzog joined the National Socialist German Workers' Party in 1931 and became head of the music department of the Militant League for German Culture. After the Machtergreifung by the Nazi, he and 87 other writers signed the Gelöbnis treuester Gefolgschaft to Adolf Hitler in October 1933. In 1934, he published the book Was ist deutsche Musik in which he wrote: "We want music that is filled with the expressive power of the National Socialist idea." In the same year on 1 July, he became editor of the magazine Die Musik, Organ der NS-Kulturgemeinde. At the end of August 1935, Herzog was briefly held in Gestapo custody because, according to the diary entries of Goebbels, he had seriously insulted his wife Magda. This only harmed him in the short term, however, because in 1936 he was promoted from editor to editor of the journal Die Musik by the editor-in-chief. However, he was later replaced by Herbert Gerigk. The latter judged thus Herzog: "Herzog made Die Musik into an uncompromisingly managed organ of National Socialist culture."

After the Second World War Herzog worked as a music teacher. He died in his hometown Oldenburg in 1976 at the age of 74.

== Work ==
- Wilhelm Backhaus. Der Pianist der Totalität, Berlin 1935 (Musikalische Schriftenreihe der NS-Kulturgemeinde, H. 8)
