= Eva Weissweiler =

Eva-Ruth Weissweiler
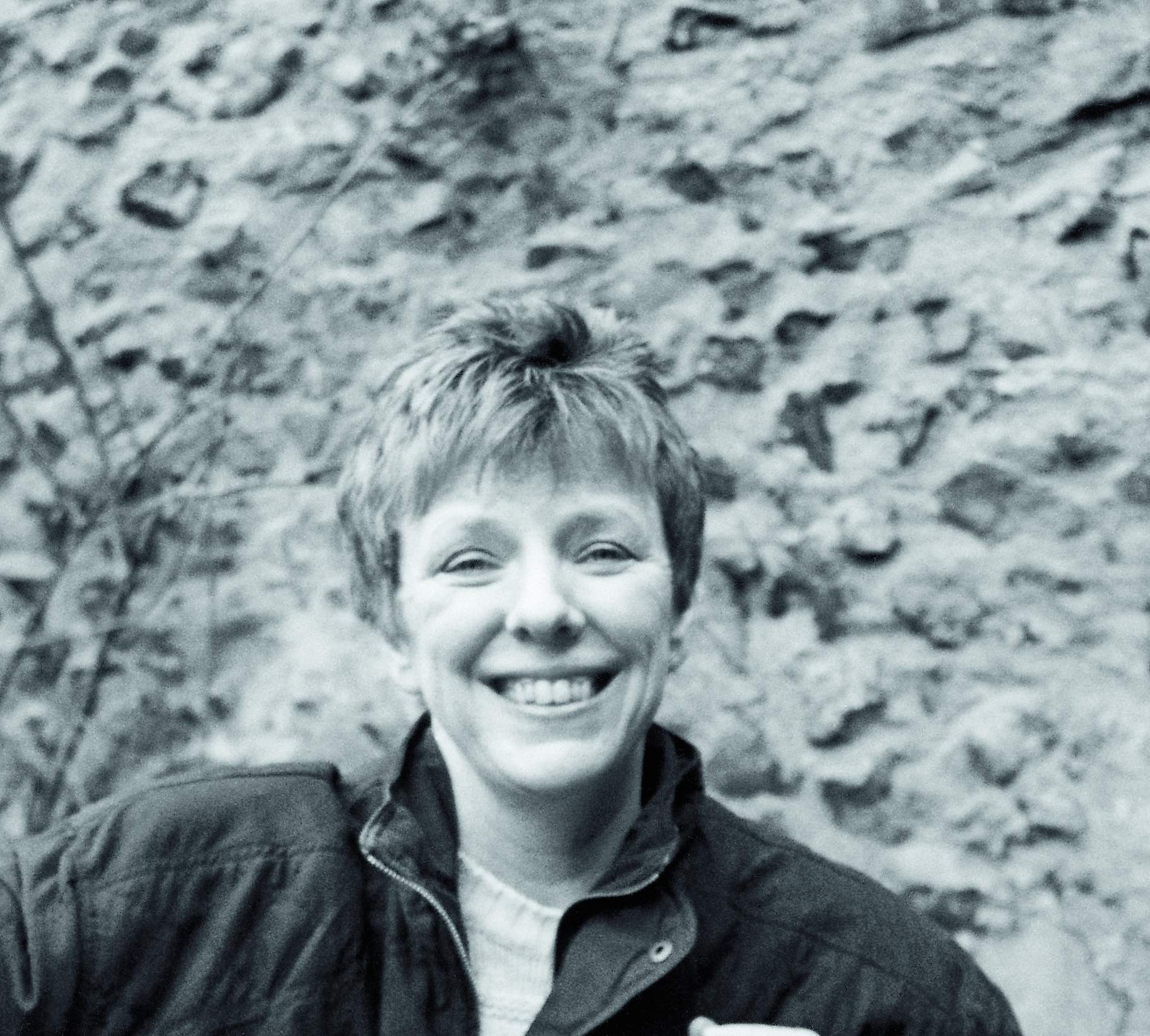
- Eva Weissweiler in 2002
- Born: 14 February 1951 (age 75); Mönchengladbach, Bavaria, Germany
- Occupations: Writer and musicologist

Eva-Ruth Weissweiler (born 14 February 1951 in Mönchengladbach) is a German writer, musicologist and non fiction writer.

== Life ==
Weissweiler entered the Mönchengladbach State Girls' Grammar School in 1961, where she graduated in 1969 (Abitur). She comes from a music-loving merchant family and has two older brothers.

In addition to school lessons, she attended the Rheinische Musikschule in Cologne and the Robert Schumann Hochschule in Düsseldorf. She was twice State winner in the Jugend musiziert competition on the concert of alto recorder and at the age of 14 she made concert tours with this instrument as a soloist, among others to England. After short piano studies at the Cologne University of Music and Dance, she enrolled in the winter semester 1969/70 to study musicology, German and Islamic studies at the Rheinische Friedrich-Wilhelms-Universität Bonn, where she received her doctorate in 1976. Her dissertation was published under her married name at the time, Eva Perkuhn, which she took again shortly before the birth of her first child, to take up her maiden name, Weissweiler, again. After her studies she worked as a radio editor and freelance writer.

Weissweiler is the author of biographies, novels, short stories, radio features and documentaries. She has written articles for almost all German-language stations and texts for the Frankfurter Allgemeine, the Süddeutsche, Emma and the Kölner Stadtanzeiger. She edited the correspondence between Clara and Robert Schumann and Fanny and Felix Mendelssohn. Another main focus is the reappraisal of the period of National Socialism in musicology, to which she dedicated several documentaries for the NDR and WDR. Furthermore, the literature of migrants in Germany. Together with her husband she filmed 10 portraits of authors on this topic under the motto Nationality Writers on behalf of the former Ministry of Culture, Urban Development and Sport NRW.

She received a working scholarship from the state North Rhine-Westphalia in 1994 and a scholarship from the Kunststiftung NRW in 1995.

Weissweiler is a member of the PEN Centre Germany and - after an interruption of several years - since the end of 2007 of the Verband deutscher Schriftstellerinnen und Schriftsteller in the Vereinte Dienstleistungsgewerkschaft, whose attitude towards right-wing extremism in her own ranks she has repeatedly and vehemently criticized. In May 2009 she founded the association AURA 09 (Action of independent Rhine-Ruhr authors) in Cologne together with a circle of 15 authors to promote and stimulate the literary discussion culture in the region. The association was active in the border area between literature and social work and soon made a name for itself in Cologne. Among other things, it was the first literary group in Cologne to recall the works of those colleagues whose estates were destroyed when the Historical Archive of the City of Cologne collapsed. As spokesperson for this association, she and her husband were for years the director and initiator of writing and photography courses for mentally ill people, the results of which were presented in many exhibitions. After seven years of dedicated work, the association was dissolved in autumn 2016

== Work ==
- (under the name Eva-Ruth Perkuhn:) Die Theorien zum arabischen Einfluss auf die europäische Musik des Mittelalters. Diss., Walldorf-Hessen 1976 (Beiträge zur Sprach- und Kulturgeschichte des Orients, vol. 26), ISBN 3-936687-26-9.
- Komponistinnen aus 500 Jahren: eine Kulturgeschichte in Biographien und Werkbeispielen. Fischer Taschenbuch Verlag, Frankfurt, 1981, ISBN 3-596-23714-9.
- (As editor) Fanny Mendelssohn, Italienisches Tagebuch. Luchterhand Literaturverlag, 2. Auflage Darmstadt 1988 (Frankfurt, 1981), ISBN 3-630-61607-0. With preface, portrait, illustrations of sheet music, notes and index of persons.
- Komponistinnen vom Mittelalter bis zur Gegenwart (erweiterte Neuauflage von Komponistinnen aus 500 Jahren), dtv München 1999, ISBN 3-423-30726-9.
- Clara Schumann. Eine Biographie. Hoffmann und Campe, Hamburg 1991, ISBN 3-455-08332-3.
- Gejagt von der Liebe. Roman, Fischer Taschenbuch Verlag, Frankfurt 1993, ISBN 3-548-30325-0.
- Monodram für eine Pianistin. Play, Bad Homburg vor der Höhe 1994.
- Der Sohn des Cellisten. Roman, Hoffmann und Campe, Hamburg 1996, ISBN 3-548-30422-2.
- (As editor) Fanny und Felix Mendelssohn, "Die Musik will gar nicht rutschen ohne Dich". Briefwechsel 1821 bis 1846. Propyläen Berlin 1997, ISBN 3 549 05528 5. With preface and epilogue, portraits, overview tables, notes and index of persons.
- Ausgemerzt! Das Lexikon der Juden in der Musik und seine mörderischen Folgen. Dittrich, Cologne 1999, ISBN 3-920862-25-2.
- Tussy Marx. Das Drama der Vatertochter. Biography. Kiepenheuer & Witsch, Cologne 2002, ISBN 3-462-03139-2.
- Wilhelm Busch: Der lachende Pessimist. Biographie. Kiepenheuer & Witsch, Cologne 2007, ISBN 978-3-462-03930-6.
- Otto Klemperer : ein deutsch-jüdisches Künstlerleben. Kiepenheuer & Witsch, Cologne 2010, ISBN 978-3-462-04179-8.
- Erbin des Feuers. Friedelind Wagner. Eine Spurensuche. Pantheon Verlag 2013, ISBN 3-570-55190-3.
- Notre Dame de Dada. Luise Straus-Ernst – das dramatische Leben der ersten Frau von Max Ernst. Kiepenheuer & Witsch, Cologne 2016, ISBN 978-3-462-04894-0.
- Lady Liberty: Das Leben der jüngsten Marx-Tochter Eleanor. Hoffmann und Campe, Hamburg 2018, ISBN 978-3-455-00292-8.
- Das Echo deiner Frage: Dora und Walter Benjamin – Biographie einer Beziehung. Hoffmann und Campe, Hamburg 2020, ISBN 978-3-455-00643-8. In February 2020, the book was ranked number 1 on the nonfiction bestseller list of Die Zeit, die ZDF and the Deutschlandfunk.

== Publisher ==
- Fanny Mendelssohn, Italienisches Tagebuch. (Societäts-Verlag, Frankfurt. 1981) 2nd edition Luchterhand Literaturverlag, Darmstadt 1988, ISBN 3-630-61607-0. With preface, portrait, illustrations of sheet music, notes and index of persons.
- Clara und Robert Schumann: Briefwechsel. 3 volumes, Stroemfeld/Roter Stern, Basel 1984–2001, ISBN 978-3-87877-189-0.
- Fanny Mendelssohn: Ein Portrait in Briefen. Ullstein, Frankfurt 1985, ISBN 3-548-30171-1.
- Fanny und Felix Mendelssohn: Die Musik will gar nicht rutschen ohne dich. Briefwechsel 1821–1846. Ullstein, Berlin 1997, ISBN 3-549-05528-5. With preface and epilogue, portraits, overview tables, notes and index of persons.
- (with Ulla Lessmann:) Lese-Lust. Eine Anthologie. Dittrich, Köln 1999, ISBN 3-920862-23-6.
- (with Hidir Celik and Helle Jepsen:) Nationalität: Schriftsteller Zugewanderte Autoren in Nordrhein-Westfalen. Free Pen, Bonn 2002, ISBN 3-933672-12-0.
