= Karl Helmerding =

German actor (1822–1899)

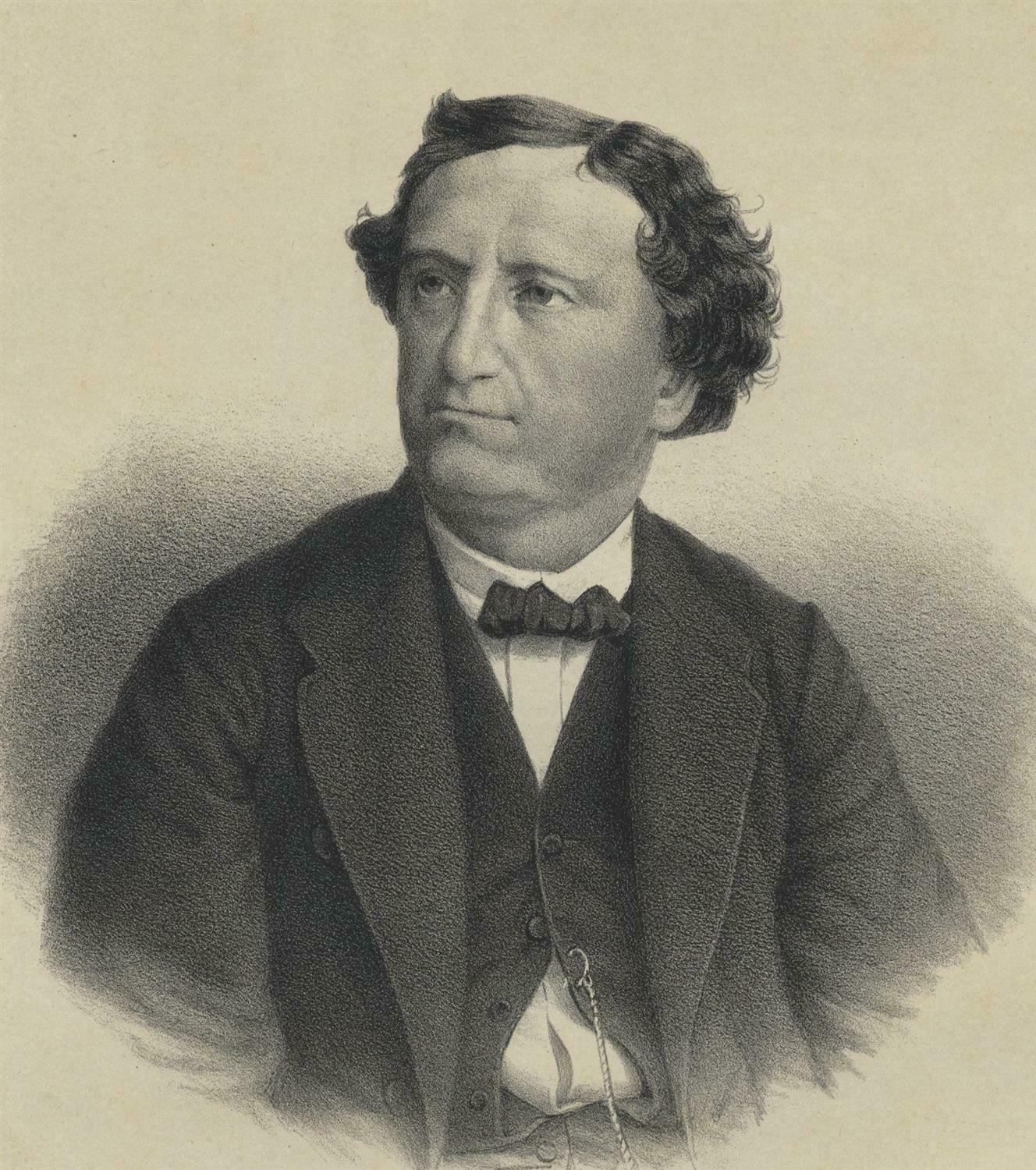
Portrait of Karl Helmerding

Karl Heinrich Helmerding (29 October 1822 – 20 December 1899) was a German folk actor and was considered the most popular comedian of all time in Berlin.

== Life ==
Helmerding was born in Berlin as the son of a master locksmith, whose trade he also learned. He also made successful studies in drawing under Johann Gottfried Schadow, and exercised his urge for the theatre on several small stages in his father's city.

He made his debut as a professional actor in 1847 in Meissen and then worked for four years at the Hennig Bros. summer theatre in Berlin under director Carli Callenbach, who employed the beginner, who until then had played intriguer and character roles, in the comic field. After being engaged in Sondershausen in the winter of 1850 and in Erfurt in 1851, Helmerding became a member of the Königsstädtisches Theater in 1852 and, after a winter engagement in Cologne in 1854, a member of the Krolloper Theatre in Berlin.

In 1855, he was engaged by Franz Wallner to Posen and soon returned with him to Berlin, where for two decades he was an ornament and pillar of the Königsstädtisches Theater, soon popularly called Wallner-Theater after Wallner, and of the Berlin Lokalposse. He retired from the stage in 1878.

Gotthilf Weisstein describes Helmerding's acting idiosyncrasy in an article on the occasion of the artist's 70th birthday as follows: {{quote|Karl Helmerding's art is a very peculiar one. There is hardly an actor - perhaps only Friedrich Haase excepted - who has been imitated so much as our Berlin comedian, whose manner and nature dominated the German stage for a decade and a half. At that time, every provincial stage had a comedian who tried to imitate Helmerding's specifically Berlin way of speaking with its nasal timbre, his original sharp, hasty, somewhat angular movements, his peculiar parlando in the couplet recital - no one achieved him in his idiosyncrasy: as the Berliners say - "sie kriegten die Forsche nicht raus" (they couldn't get the Forsche out). Helmerding is far from being what is called a comedian in the usual theatre jargon, he is rather a born character actor, an artist who gives a type in every role, a firmly seen, grasped and equally firmly rendered figure. Two quite separate tones prevail in his artistic temperament: one is the absolutely faithful representation of the real, the other is the humorous exaggeration - thus he masters in his mode of representation both the portrait and the caricature - two modes of representation which have never been mixed in his work.}

Helmerding was very well acquainted with Otto von Bismarck, who liked to take advantage of Helmerding's stage fame and popularity.

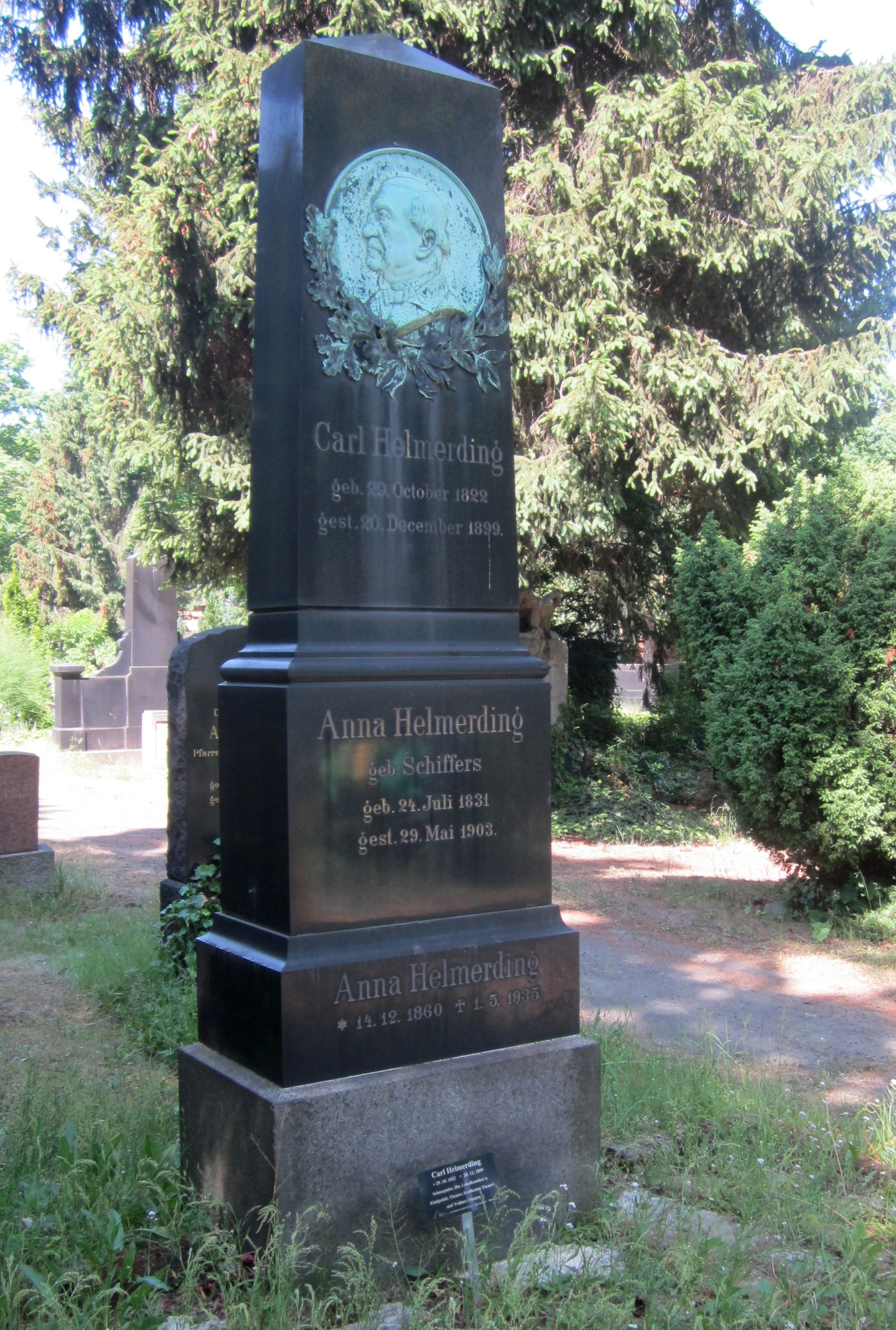
Grave of Karl Helmerding

Having been terminally ill for some time, Helmerding died on 20 December 1899 at the age of 77 in his flat on Tempelhofer Ufer in Berlin. His grave is located in the Cemetery II of the Jerusalems- und Neue Kirche in Berlin-Kreuzberg. The gravestone is an obelisk of black granite, with a bronze relief tondo inset on the front with the portrait of the deceased.

His son Fritz Helmerding (1859-1947) was also a theatre actor.

== Reception ==
Helmerding actually made every part a brilliant role and preferred to portray the disillusioned, sceptical petty bourgeois of Berlin's suburbs, who had to climb the ladder to city life. Apart from his wonderful versatility, it was mainly the caustic (Berlin) humour, the cutting manner of speaking, the strictly closed character sketch and the peculiar, almost spoken delivery of the couplets, which usually moved only in the tightest rhythms, which made even his most garish characters acceptable.

== Publications ==
Helmerding also successfully dabbled in original dramatic works (the best known: "Eine Weinprobe"), in translations and adaptations, and wrote for journals; among others, in Berlin also for a theatre journal that bore his name: "Helmerding - Humoristisch-satyrisches Theaterblatt".

== Roles ==
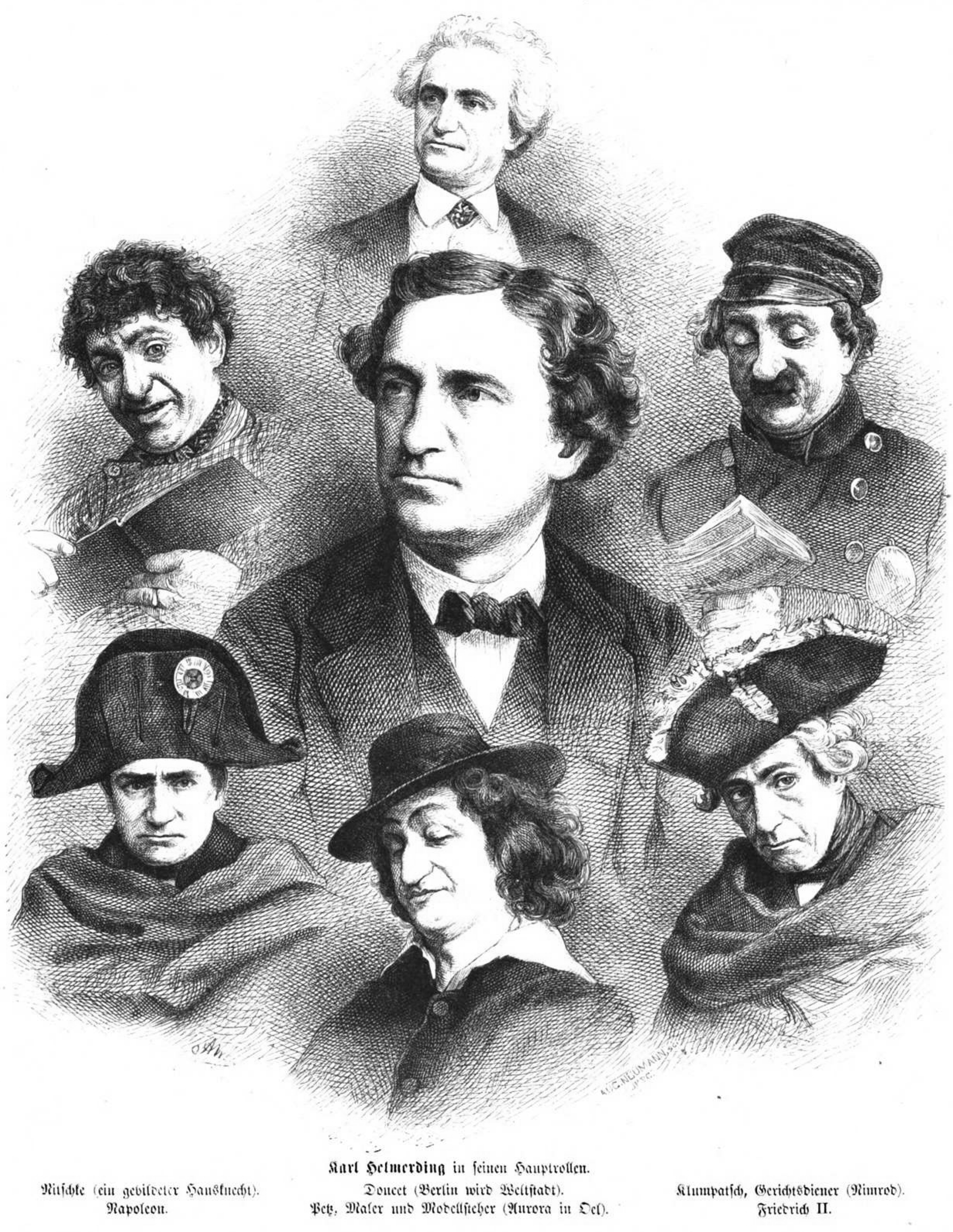
Karl Helmerding in seinen Hauptrollen (1868).

- Doucet – Haussegen oder Berlin wird Weltstadt (David Kalisch)
- Steglitz – Otto Bellmann (David Kalisch)
- Elsterwitz – Die Kunst, geliebt zu werden (Ferdinand Gumbert)
- Nitschke – Der Gebildete Hausknecht (David Kalisch)
- Klumpatsch – Nimrod (Hermann Salingré and Rudolf Bial)
- Petz – Aurora in Öl (David Kalisch)
- Weigelt – Mein Leopold (Adolphe L'Arronge)
