= Encyclopedia of Jews in Music =

Nazi-sponsored encyclopedia

The Encyclopedia of Jews in Music (Lexikon der Juden in der Musik) was a Nazi-sponsored encyclopedia first published in Germany in 1940, which listed people involved in the music industry who were defined under Nazi racial laws as 'Jewish' or 'half-Jewish'. It was edited by Herbert Gerigk and Theophil Stengel and published in Berlin in 1940 by Bernhard Hahnefeld, with official support from the Nazi Party's "Institute for Study of the Jewish Question". The book's subtitle declared that it was produced "on behalf of the national leadership of the Nazi Party for official reasons, partly officially certified documents".

The encyclopedia appeared in the context of Nazi policies which repressed Jews involved in music and forbade the performance of works by Jewish composers. A similar encyclopedia by Hans Brückner, entitled Musical ABC of Jews, had previously been published in 1935.

The encyclopedia's coverage was very broad, covering musicians, musicologists, librettists, conductors, music publishers and other people linked to music who were considered "Jewish" or "Half-Jewish", as well as listing forbidden "Jewish" works. It was kept up to date via informers and the staff of the "Sonderstab Musik" of the Einsatzstab Reichsleiter Rosenberg. According to the Eva Weissweiler's 1999 book, the encyclopedia appeared in five editions - the first had 380 columns, the third (1941) 394 columns, (1943) and the final edition (12th to 14th thousand printed copies) had 404 columns of listings.

It was one of the proscribed books in the Soviet occupation zone.

== Bibliography ==
- (in German) Eva Weissweiler: Ausgemerzt! Das Lexikon der Juden in der Musik und seine mörderischen Folgen. Dittrich, Köln 1999, ISBN 3-920862-25-2 (Includes a facsimile of the complete original edition).
- (in German) Fred K. Prieberg: Handbuch Deutsche Musiker 1933–1945. CD-ROM-Lexikon, Kiel 2004.
- (in German) Stengel, Theo; Gerigk, Herbert (1940). Lexikon der Juden in der Musik. Berlin: Bernhard Ahnefeld Verlag – via Internet Archive.
