= Theophil Stengel =

German composer (1905–1995)

Karl Theophil Stengel (12 July 1905 – 9 October 1995) was a German chorus master, composer and Nazi musicologist, notable for his co-authoring of the antisemitic Encyclopedia of Jews in Music. He was born in Bodersweier, Kehl and died in Brühl (Baden).
