= Herbert Gerigk =

German musicologist (1905–1996)

Herbert Gerigk (2 March 1905, Mannheim – 20 June 1996, Dortmund) was a German musicologist, notable for his co-authoring of the Nazi-sponsored Encyclopedia of Jews in Music.

After graduation in 1928, Herbert Gerigk published in 1932 a thesis on Giuseppe Verdi. It was the first important musicological overall presentation of Verdi in Germany and appeared in the series "The Great Masters of Music."

Gerigk joined the Nazi Party in 1932 and joined the SA in 1933. From 1935 he worked in the National Socialist German Reich as "head the music section for the monitoring of the intellectual and ideological training and education of the Nazi Party". In 1935 he joined the SS.

Gerigk took over the planning of the music policy of Alfred Rosenberg and was responsible for its implementation in the Rosenberg's office. This policy was to suppress Jewish representation in musical life by removing Jews from their positions and stopping the spread of "Jewish" music.

Gerigk's most famous work was the antisemitic Encyclopedia of Jews in Music, which he edited in collaboration with Theophil Stengel, Speaker of the Reich Music Chamber. The aim of the work was to prevent 'accidental' performances of works by Jewish and part-Jewish composers, to identify all Jewish music practitioners, but particularly to devalue composers fixed in the German musical tradition such as Felix Mendelssohn, Giacomo Meyerbeer and Gustav Mahler.

During the Second World War, Gerigk headed the Office of Music in Einsatzstab Reichsleiter Rosenberg, and was a driving force in all activities of the 'Music Special Staff' in occupied countries. The activity included the expropriation of cultural property in the occupied countries and its transport to Germany. In occupied France alone, Gerigk's investigators over two years carried out confiscations from 34,500 Jewish houses or apartments, including those of Emmerich Kálmán, Darius Milhaud, Fernand Halphen, Arno Poldes, and Gregor Piatigorsky. Of the machinery of destruction of the Holocaust, Gerigk wrote in 1942: "The question must be raised as to whether it is appropriate, given the liquidation of European Jewry, to permit Jewish half-breeds as cultural workers in any form."

In 1943 he became chief editor of the music magazine promoted by Rosenberg, Music in War; in 1944 he was promoted to SS-Hauptsturmführer.

After World War II, Gerigk's association with the Nazis prevented an academic career. However, he worked as a music critic at the Dortmund Ruhr-Nachrichten. In 1954 he wrote a Dictionary of Music, which was issued by the same firm (Bernhard Hahnefeld) that had published him during the Nazi era.
