= Good for Nothing =

Good for Nothing may refer to:

- Good for Nothing (2012 film), New Zealand film
- Good for Nothing (2014 film), Italian film
- Good-for-Nothing, 1922 German film
- Good for Nothing (song), 2011 single by Hard-Fi
- "Good for Nothing", 2001 song by Every Little Thing
- His New Profession, or The Good for Nothing, a 1914 American film starring Charlie Chaplin
- The Good for Nothing (1917 film), an American silent drama film

== See also ==
- Memoirs of a Good-for-Nothing, 1866 translation of Eichendorff's novella Aus dem Leben eines Taugenichts
