= Juncker-Bücher =

Illustrated German-language literary book series

The Juncker-Bücher (Note: Sometimes also called Junckerbücher.) (“Juncker Books”) are an illustrated German-language literary book series published by the Axel Juncker Verlag in Berlin-Charlottenburg from 1917 until 1919, with announced 12 volumes, which did not all appear. (Note: The last volume recorded in the German National Library carries the number 12 (DNB), the publication of the number 8 ("Clemens Brentano. Das Märchen vom Kommanditchen. Mit Bildern von Hugo Steiner-Prag.") was announced, but it did not appear (cf. f.e. Eskimomärchen).)

== Introduction ==
The volumes of the series contain both German-language works and translations from other languages, comparable to the volumes of the Insel-Bücherei. They were issued in a relative small, handy format. The first volume is the German novella Aus dem Leben eines Taugenichts (Memoirs of a Good-for-Nothing) by Joseph Freiherr von Eichendorff, the ninth was the French work Die Geschichte des Spießbürgers (Bourgeois de Paris) by Henry Monnier. Various renowned (especially German) artists contributed to the design of the volumes, some of them appeard as luxury editions.

== Volumes ==
The following titles were published in the series:

- 1. Joseph Freiherr von Eichendorff. Aus dem Leben eines Taugenichts. Novelle. Mit Scherenschnitten von Alfred Thon.
- 2. Erich M. Simon. Das Abenteuer des Herrn Balthasar Dienegott Sieversen. Erzählung. Mit Bildern des Verfassers.
- 3. Franziska Mann. Der Schäfer. Eine Geschichte aus der Stille. Mit Scherenschnitten von Alfred Thon.
- 4. Wilhelm Hauff. Phantasien im Bremer Ratskeller: Ein Herbstgeschenk für Freunde des Weines. Novelle. Mit Bildern von Paul Scheurich.
- 5. Heinrich Clauren. Mimili. Novelle. Mit Bildern von Hugo Steiner-Prag.
- 6. Lucian. Göttergespräche. Übersetzt von Chr. Wieland. Mit Bildern von Paul Scheurich.
- 7. Friedrich Schlegel. Lucinde. Mit Radierungen von Mart. E. Philipp.
- 9. Henry Monnier. Die Geschichte des Spießbürgers. Übersetzt von Hans Pfeifer. Mit Bildern nach alten Kupfern von Monnier.
- 10. E. T. A. Hoffmann. Aus dem Leben dreier Freunde. Mit Zeichnungen von Felix Müller.
- 11. A. Puschkin. Die Reise nach Erzerum. Eine Novelle. Mit Bildern von Benno Wulfsohn.
- 12. Agnes Henningsen. Das Glück. Eine spanische Liebesgeschichte. Mit Zeichnungen von Fritz Albrecht.
