= Weltende (Jakob van Hoddis) =

Poem by Jakob van Hoddis

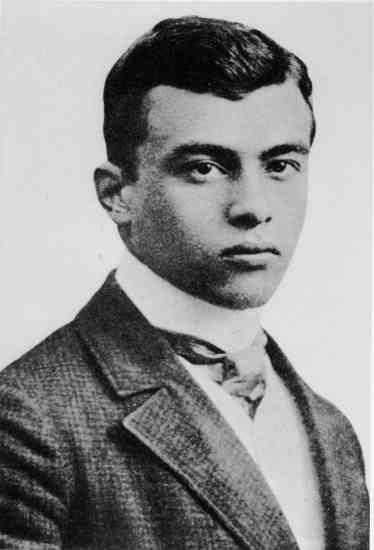
Jacob van Hoddis, 1910

Weltende (German pronunciation: [ˈvɛltˌʔɛndə]) is a poem by the German poet Jakob van Hoddis, the anagrammatic pseudonym of Hans Davidsohn (1887-1942). The poem is widely regarded as a seminal work of German expressionism, although its author remained relatively unknown for many years, particularly in the United States. Van Hoddis was killed in 1942, most likely in the Sobibór extermination camp.

== German original and its adaption ==
Van Hoddis's poem Weltende has been translated into English multiple times. Many translations differ from the original in terms of rhyme scheme, rhythm, verse form, and tone, which may affect the interpretation of the poem. The following adaption by Natias Neutert affords a little generosity on poetic licence (verse 6: "as if they were midges"), but consider all specifications, such as rhyme scheme, masculine and feminine cadences, and principally the spirit of the original:

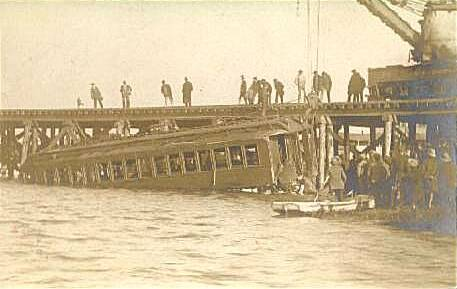
Train Wreck

Weltende

Dem Bürger fliegt vom spitzen Kopf der Hut,
In allen Lüften hallt es wie Geschrei,
Dachdecker stürzen ab und gehn entzwei.
Und an den Küsten – liest man – steigt die Flut.

Der Sturm ist da, die wilden Meere hupfen
An Land, um dicke Dämme zu zerdrücken.
Die meisten Menschen haben einen Schnupfen.
Die Eisenbahnen fallen von den Brücken. <

World's End

The burgher’s hat flies away in a trice.
In all quarters resounds hullabaloo.
Roof tilers plummet down and break in two.
Along the coasts — one reads — the floodings rise.

The storm is here, wuthering seas are hopping
Ashore to crush dams as if they were midges.
Most people have a cold that is not stopping.
The railway waggons tumble down from bridges.

== Creation, first and later publications ==
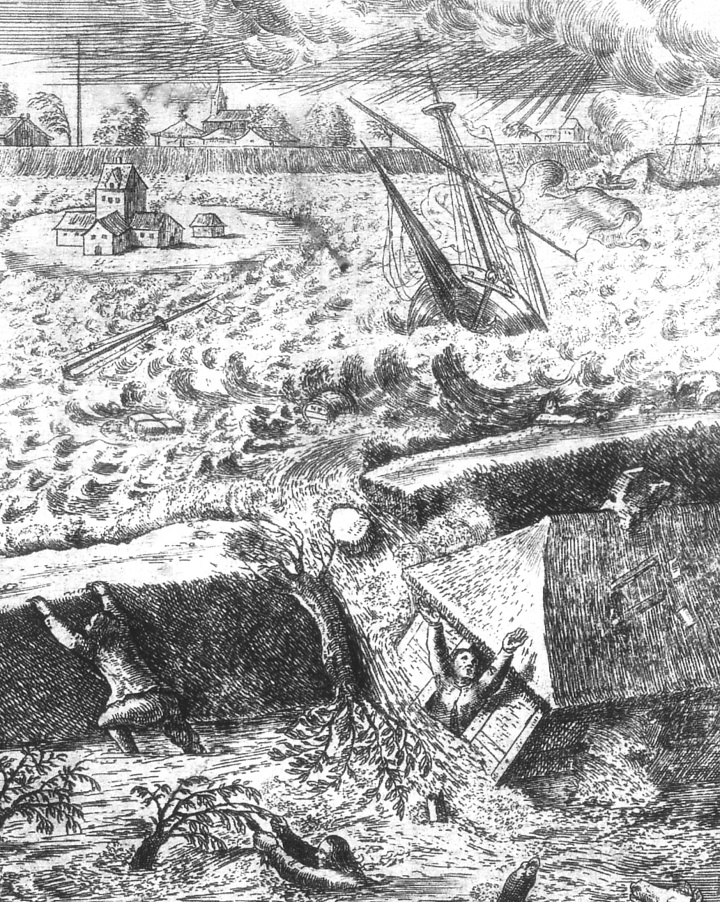
Historical dike burst, copper engraving, 1661

The poem, probably written in 1910, was first published at 11. January in 1911 in «Der Demokrat», a free-thinking Berlin magazine, almost four years before the outbreak of the First World War. At the end of 1919 and the start of 1920 it was published in the anthology of expressionist poetry titled Menschheitsdämmerung by Kurt Pinthus, an explosive pioneering work of all those experiments, and till today still the representative collection of Expressionism.

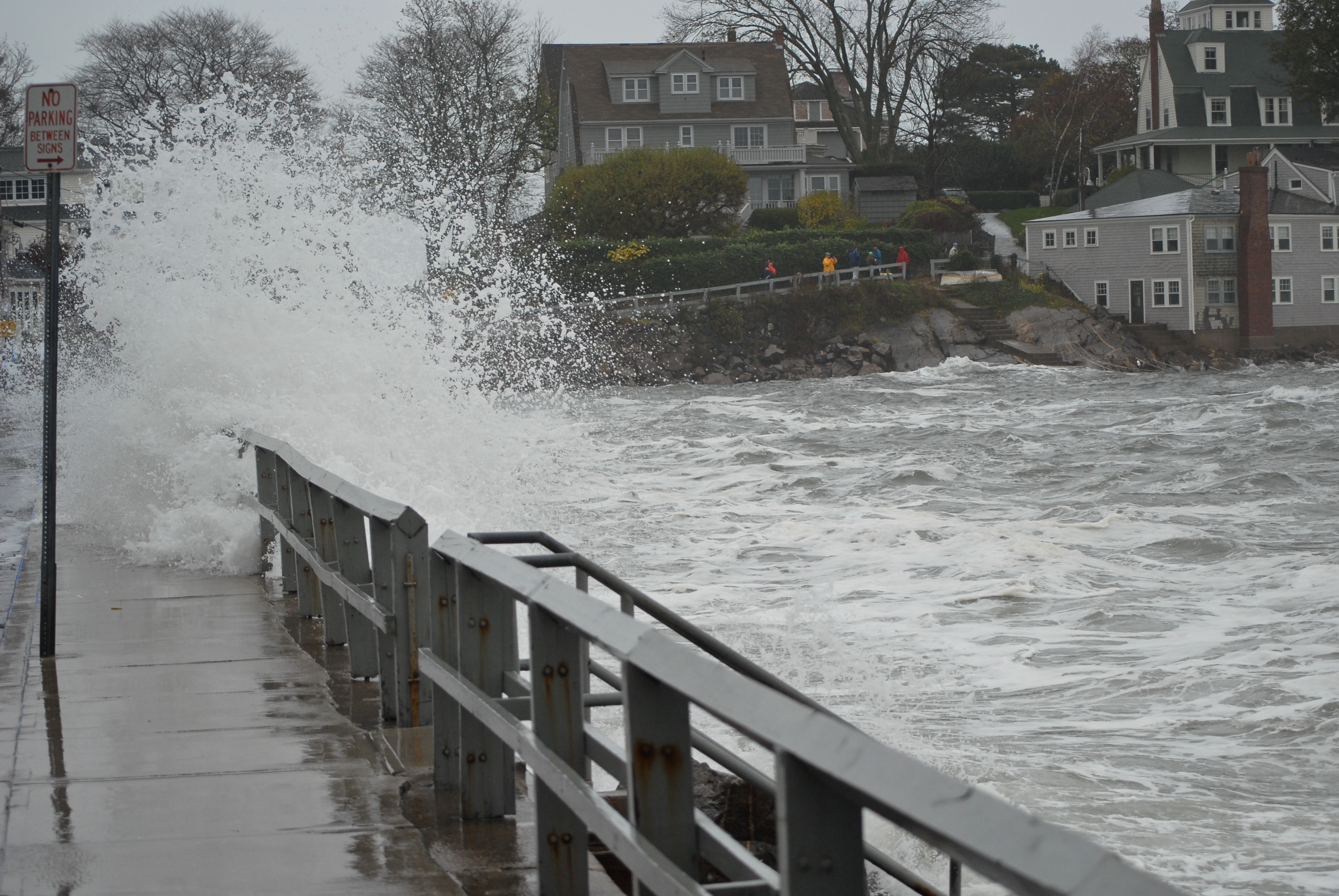
Flooding

== Figurehead of the movement ==
The two stanzas "entered the then literary scene with a beat of a kettledrum and advanced to an epoch-making 'earworm' among all Expressionist poems, and it was taken as family crest in a trice," as the German poet and translator Natias Neutert comments on van Hoddis' poem in a note. Therefore, Jattie Enklaar/Hans Ester/Evelyne Tax class van Hoddis' Weltende as a "keypoem". To get an idea of the impact of these eight lines, a contemporary witness may called and quoted: The writer Johannes R. Becher, who later became Minister of Culture of the GDR, described the poem in 1957, one year before his death, as "Marseillaise of expressionistic rebellion" and wrote with sustaining deep admiration: "These two stanzas, o these eight lines seemed to transform us into other people, they lifted us from a world of dull bourgeoisie that we despised and from which we did not know how we should leave." "It was a feeling of superiority and freedom, what these verses were able to awaken," as the German literary scientist Helmut Hornbogen classified the effect.

== Literary historical classifications ==
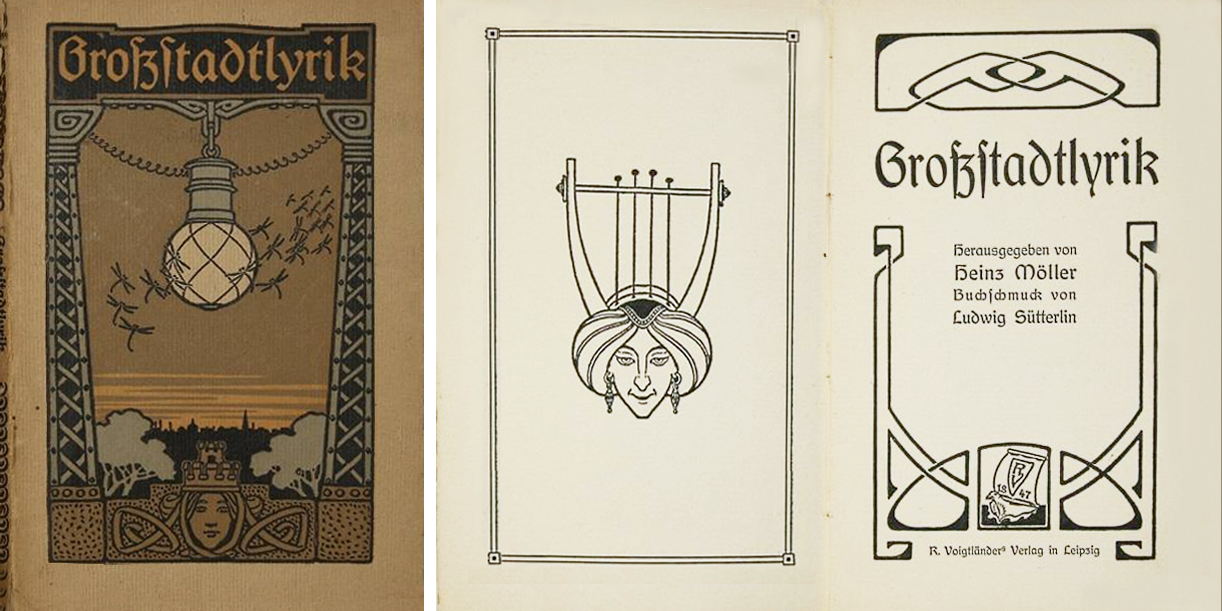
Cover of the anthology Großstadtlyrik (big city poetry), in 1903, a German phenomenon and term

=== Genre ===
The poem Weltende is assigned to the genre of early expressionistic Großstadtlyrik (big city poetry). The genre traces back, as the Germanist Hugo Friedrich describes, to the forerunners Arthur Rimbaud and Charles Baudelaire, and to their fight for "...being absolutely modern...“ (Rimbaud), both poets practised a symbiosis of literature and life.

=== Formatwise ===
Formally seen, the poem is held more conventionally as other expressionistic poems with their break of rules of grammar and with a lot of extraordinary expressive neologisms.

=== Structure of the poem ===
The poem is constructed out of two stanzas with always four verses. The rhyming scheme in the first stanza has an embracing rhyme (ABBA), in the second one a cross rhyme (CDCD). Metrical seen an iambic pentameter having some irregularities in the second stanza. The first one is accentuated with masculine cadences, the second one with female cadences.

=== Title, topic, motif ===
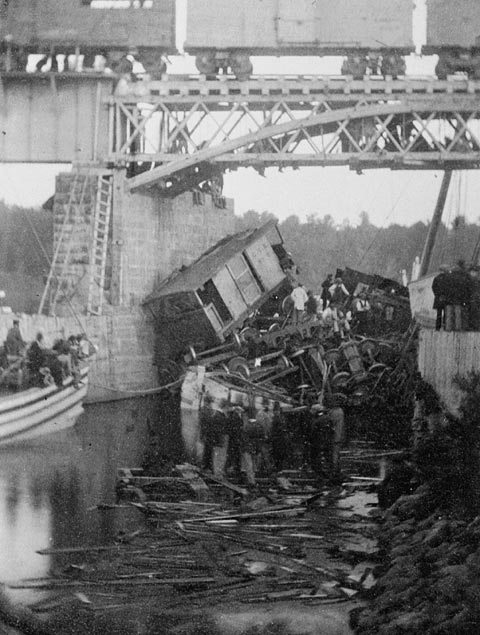
Train accident

The title Weltende means the same as end of the world or end time, but van Hoddis used it ironically, because the proper meaning is natural catastrophe, which is actually the poem's subject matter. The main motif is the struggle between two opposing forces: the first nature and the so-called second nature, build up by mankind with the material of the first one. In a nutshell: nature vs. society.

== Interpretation ==
Some interpretations suggest parallels between the poem and modern actor-network theory. There is no lyrical "I" who acts, but the actors are the elements of nature. At the beginning, for example, wind blows the hats off citizens' heads. Then the wild seas, according to the German poet Peter Rühmkorf, "board [pirate-like] the land like a readily capturable sandbox and treat humankind's proud work as a giant toy."

That roof tilers "break in two" (verse 3) can be taken as a hint that van Hoddis deals with a dichotomy. On the one hand, there is a serious tone in the apocalyptic title and some of the incidents described; on the other, the poem overall is playful, ironic, detached. Rühmkorf refers to this indifferent catastrophe as a "vest pocket apocalypse" (Westentaschenapokalypse).

== Versions and pitfalls of translating ==
To have introduced van Hoddis’ poem Weltende into the Anglo-American literary scene has been the merit of Michael Hamburger, British poet and translator. However, critics have noted that Hamburger's version does not replicate the rhyme scheme of the original's first stanza or the cadences of the second stanza. And the use of the word jetties—even if they are „big“— instead of the word Deiche (dams), extenuates the original's power of imagery impermissibly .

Weltende

Dem Bürger fliegt vom spitzen Kopf der Hut,
In allen Lüften hallt es wie Geschrei,
Dachdecker stürzen ab und gehn entzwei.
Und an den Küsten – liest man – steigt die Flut.

Der Sturm ist da, die wilden Meere hupfen
An Land, um dicke Dämme zu zerdrücken.
Die meisten Menschen haben einen Schnupfen.
Die Eisenbahnen fallen von den Brücken.

End Of The World

From pointed pates hats fly into the blue,
All winds resound as so with muffled cries.
Steeplejacks fall from roofs and break in two,
And on the coasts—we read —flood waters rise.

The storm has come, the seas run wild and skip
Landwards to squash big jetties there.
Most people have a cold, their noses drip.
Trains tumble from the bridges everywhere.

Hamburger's version was published in 1977. More than twenty years later the anthology German 20th Century Poetry was published by Reinhold Grimm and Irmgard Hunt. Within the anthology one finds a nearly line-by-line-takeover of Hamburger's version by Irmgard Hunt. Only six words—less than ten percent— are exchanged.

From pointed pates hats fly into the blue,
All winds resound as so with muffled cries.
Steeplejacks fall from roofs and break in two,
And on the coasts—we read —the tides rise high.

The storm is here, the seas run wild and skip
On land, crushing thick bulwarks there.
Most people have a cold, their noses drip.
Trains tumble from the bridges everywhere.

Other versions, such as those by Christopher Middleton, Richard John Ascárate, or Rolf-Peter Wille, illustrate the challenges of translating the poem's versification, imagery, and tone.

== Works ==
Only one single book, titled Weltende, was published during van Hoddis’ lifetime, in 1918. The following are available editions:

- Jakob van Hoddis. Dichtungen und Briefe (poetry and letters). Ed. by Regina Nörtemann. Wallstein, Göttingen 1987.
- Jakob van Hoddis, Weltende. Gesammelte Dichtungen (collected poetry). Ed. by Paul Pörtner, Peter Schifferli Verlag Die Arche, Zürich 1958.

== See also ==
- Jakob van Hoddis
- Wünschelrute

== Literature ==
- Ralf Georg Bogner: Einführung in die Literatur des Expressionismus. Einführungen Germanistik, ed. by Gunter E. Grimm/Klaus-Michael Bogdal. Wissenschaftliche Buchgesellschaft, Darmstadt 2005. ISBN 3-534-16901-8
- Natias Neutert: Foolnotes. Very Best German Poems. Bilingual Edition. Smith Gallery Booklet, Soho New York 1980.
- Language and Culture: German Expressionist Poetry in Franz Pfemfert’s Journal Die Aktion (1911-1919) . School of Languages and Cultures in the Faculty of Arts, Sydney University, 17 June 2011.
- Karl Riha: „Dem Bürger fliegt vom spitzen Kopf der Hut“. In: Harald Hartung (ed): Gedichte und Interpretationen, vol. 5. Reclam Verlag, Stuttgart 1983, p. 118-125. ISBN 3-15-007894-6.
- Thomas Schmid: Dem Bürger fliegt vom spitzen Kopf der Hut Dem Bürger fliegt vom spitzen Kopf der Hut, Artikel von Thomas Schmid in Die Welt, 8. Januar 2011.
