= Das zerbrochene Ringlein =

1813 poem by Joseph von Eichendorff

- by Joseph von Eichendorff
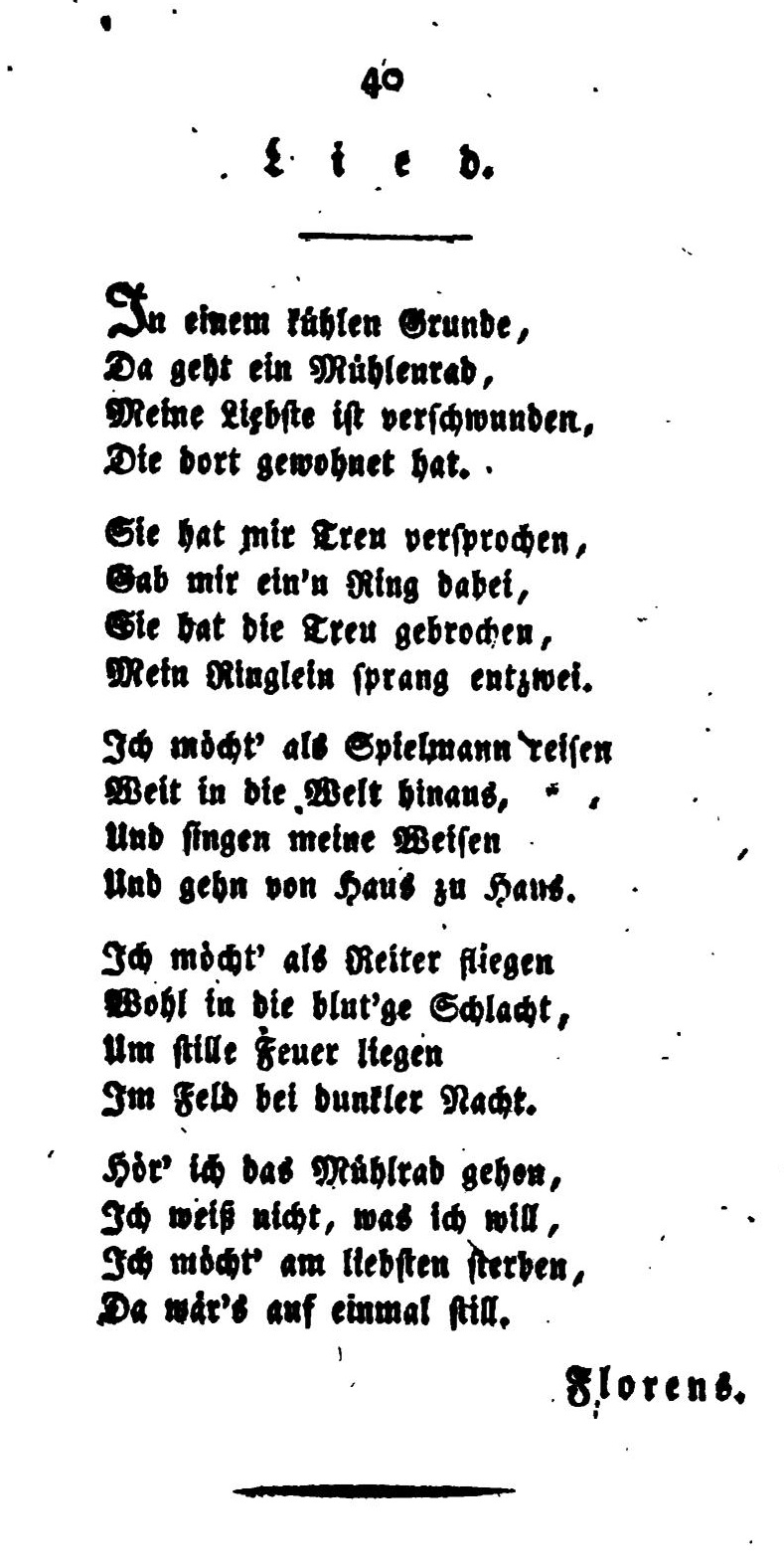
- First published in: 1813
- Language: German
- Subject: unhappy love
- Rhyme scheme: a–b–a–b
- Publisher: Justinus Kerner
- Lines: 20

"Das zerbrochene Ringlein" (The broken little ring) is a poem by Joseph von Eichendorff, published under the title "Lied" (lay, or song) in 1813 by Justinus Kerner et al. in the almanac Deutscher Dichterwald (German Poets' Forest) under the pseudonym "Florens". The poem appears under Eichendorff's name in his first novel Ahnung und Gegenwart, written in 1812 and published in 1815. It is also known by its first line, "In einem kühlen Grunde" (In a cool valley).

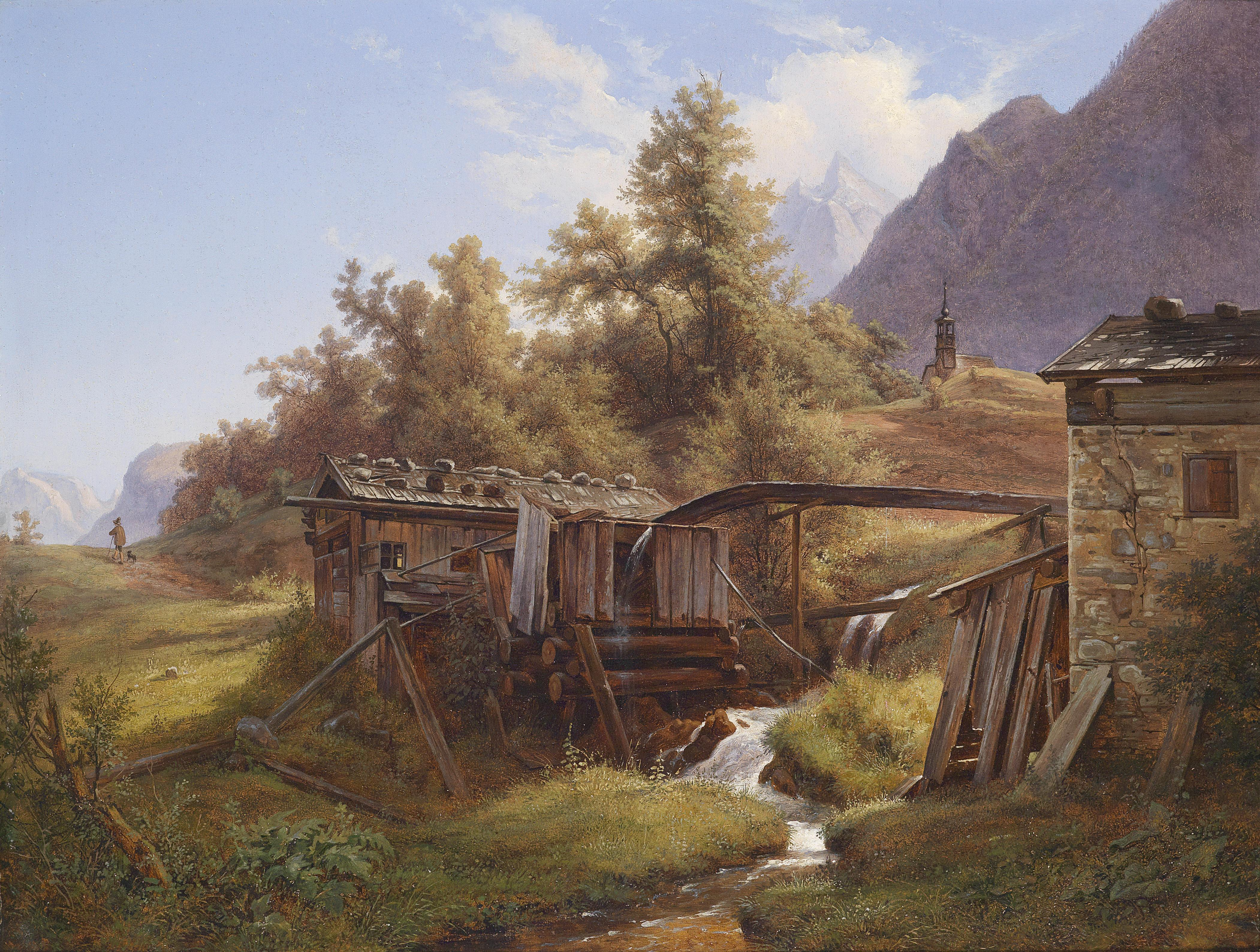
Old Mill in a Valley near Berchtesgaden (1840), by Robert Kummer

Friedrich Glück set Eichendorff's poem to music under the title "Untreue" (Infidelity). Friedrich Silcher wrote a 4-part arrangement for male choir which became popular through its publication in Volksliederbuch für Männerchor (1906).

The song has been recorded by many artists.

== Text ==
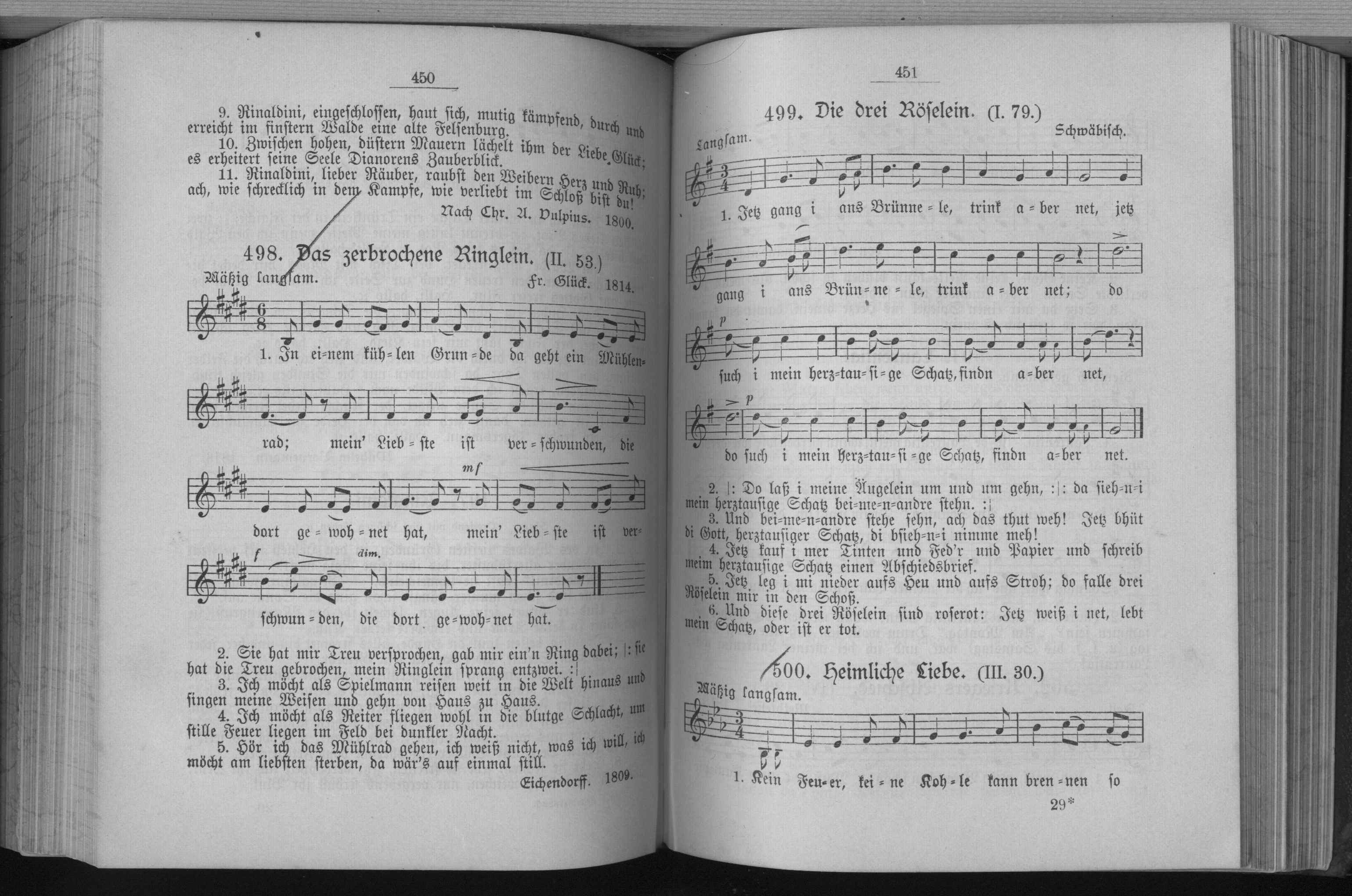
The song in Allgemeines Deutsches Kommersbuch, Lahr, 1896

"Das zerbrochene Ringlein"
In einem kühlen Grunde
Da geht ein Mühlenrad
Mein' Liebste ist verschwunden,
Die dort gewohnet hat.

Sie hat mir Treu versprochen,
Gab mir ein'n Ring dabei,
Sie hat die Treu gebrochen,
Mein Ringlein sprang entzwei.

Ich möcht' als Spielmann reisen
Weit in die Welt hinaus,
Und singen meine Weisen,
Und geh'n von Haus zu Haus.

Ich möcht' als Reiter fliegen
Wohl in die blut'ge Schlacht,
Um stille Feuer liegen
Im Feld bei dunkler Nacht.

Hör' ich das Mühlrad gehen,
Ich weiß nicht, was ich will,
Ich möcht' am liebsten sterben,
Da wär's auf einmal still!

Translation:

"The Broken Ring"
Within a watered valley
A mill turns night and day;
And there my love was dwelling
Before she went away.

A little ring she gave me,
A pledge to bind her heart;
But since her troth she's broken,
My ring has come apart.

I fain would go as minstrel
And wander far away,
And earn my bread by singing
My songs from day to day.

I fain would mount a charger
And glory seek in fight,
By silent camp-fires lying,
When falls the dark of night.

For when I hear the mill-wheel,
I know not what I will,
I fain would die, then surely
It would at last be still!

== Melody ==
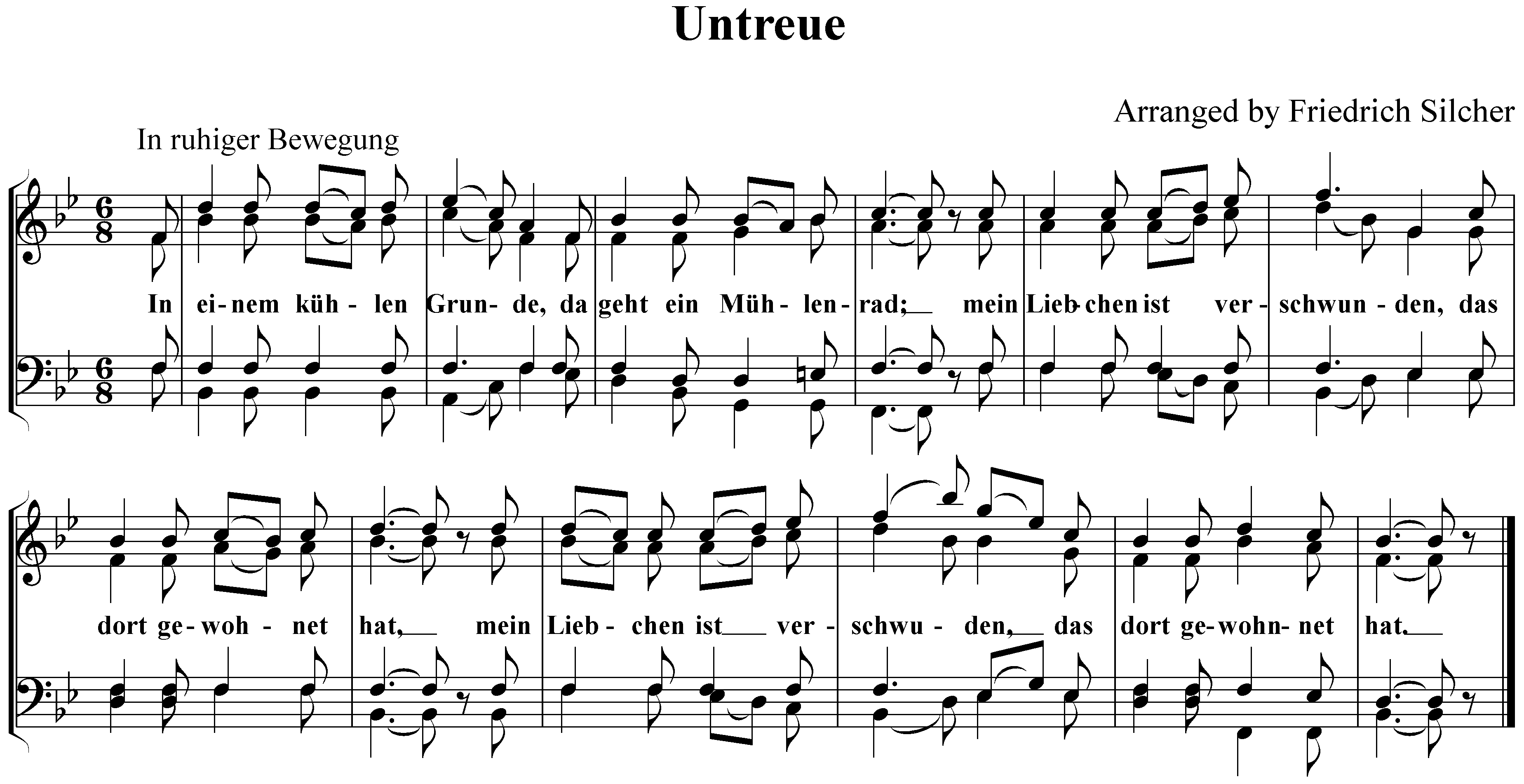
Silcher's arrangement

The song as published by Friedrich Glück.
