= Erhard Siedel =

German actor

- Born: 1 November 1895; Klipphausen, Kingdom of Saxony, German Empire
- Died: 16 November 1979 (aged 84); Switzerland
- Occupation: Actor
- Years active: 1919-1970

Erhard Siedel (1 November 1895 – 16 November 1979) was a German actor. He appeared in more than thirty films from 1919 to 1970.

== Selected filmography ==
Year	Title	Role	Notes
1922	Good-for-Nothing		
1922	The False Dimitri	Bur	
1934	The Four Musketeers	Krause	
1938	The Mystery of Betty Bonn	Thompson	
1941	Venus on Trial	Minister of education	Nazi propaganda
1941	Comrades	Doctor Halm	
1943	Don't Talk to Me About Love	Kunsthändler Friedrich	
1947	Between Yesterday and Tomorrow	Hummel	
1948	The Time with You	Registrar	
1950	Everything for the Company	Maximilian Schall	
