= Good-for-Nothing =

1922 film

- Original title: Der Taugenichts
- Directed by: Carl Froelich
- Written by: Walter Supper; G. W. Pabst; Carl Froehlich
- Based on: Memoirs of a Good-for-Nothing by Joseph von Eichendorff
- Produced by: Erich Pommer
- Starring: Erhard Siedel; Julia Serda; Valerie von Martens
- Cinematography: Vilmos Fényes
- Production company: Carl Froelich-Film
- Distributed by: UFA
- Release date: 1 September 1922 (Berlin)
- Country: Germany
- Languages: Silent; German intertitles

Good-for-Nothing (German: Der Taugenichts. Eine Geschichte von der schönen blauen Donau) is a 1922 German silent film directed by Carl Froelich based on the novella by Joseph von Eichendorff. and starring Erhard Siedel, Julia Serda and Valerie von Martens. e It premiered on 1 September 1922 at the UT Kurfürstendamm in Berlin.

== Cast ==
- Erhard Siedel
- Julia Serda
- Valerie von Martens
- Gustav Waldau
- Hans Junkermann
- Hans Thimig
