= Ahnung und Gegenwart =

1815 novel by Joseph von Eichendorff

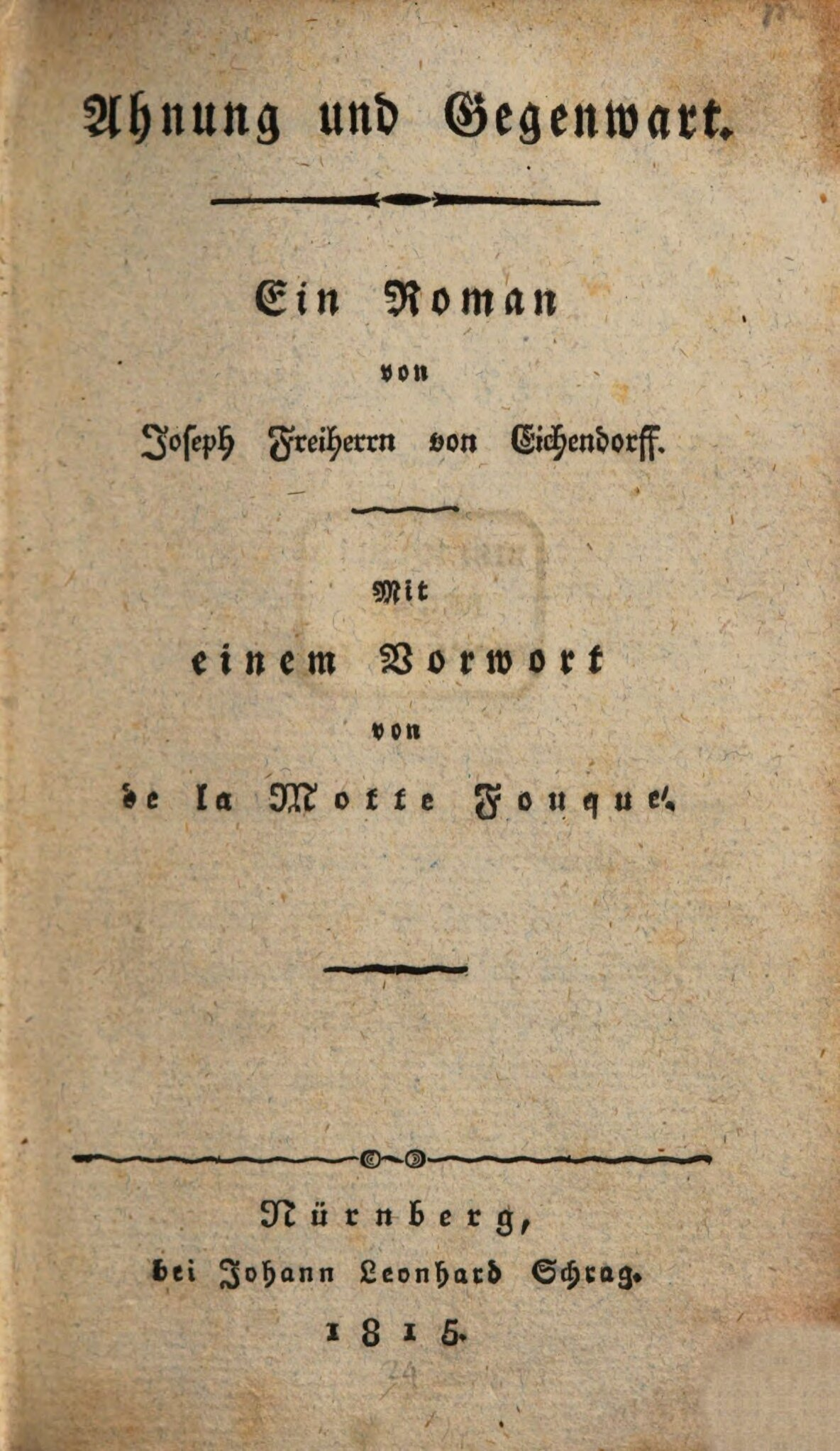
- Title page
- Author: Joseph von Eichendorff
- Translator: Dennis F. Mahoney; Maria A. Mahoney
- Language: German
- Publisher: Johann Leonhard Schrag
- Publication date: 1815
- Publication place: Bavaria
- English publication date: 2015
- Pages: 476

Ahnung und Gegenwart (lit. 'Notion and Presence') is the 1815 debut novel of the German writer Joseph von Eichendorff.

== Plot ==
The novel revolves around a young German count who loses his possessions to a foreign occupying force. It contains many poems by Eichendorff.

== Publication ==
Eichendorff wrote the novel in 1812, but due to the sensitivity of the subject during the Napoleonic Wars it was not published until 1815. It was published by Johann Leonhard Schrag in Nuremberg, with a foreword by Friedrich de la Motte Fouqué.

An annotated English translation by Dennis F. Mahoney and Maria A. Mahoney was published in 2015. It was the first complete translation of the book into any language.

== Reception ==
The book is driven more by mood than by narrative development or realistic character portraits. Several critics have explained this with Eichendorff's status as a lyric poet and propensity for irrational thinking. The scholar Thomas A. Riley has contested this interpretation, writing in 1959 that the "lack of firm outline in the characters" is because Ahnung und Gegenwart is "a rationalistic, well-thought-out web of literary allegories concerned mostly with religion and its relation to the literature of the Romantic movement in the years around 1811". According to Walther Killy, the unreality and unpredictable psychology in Ahnung und Gegenwart were the beginning of a tendency in German literature later seen in the works of Gerhart Hauptmann, Hermann Hesse and Ernst Wiechert.

== See also ==
- "Das zerbrochene Ringlein", one of the poems included in the book
