= Wünschelrute =

Рoem by Joseph von Eichendorff

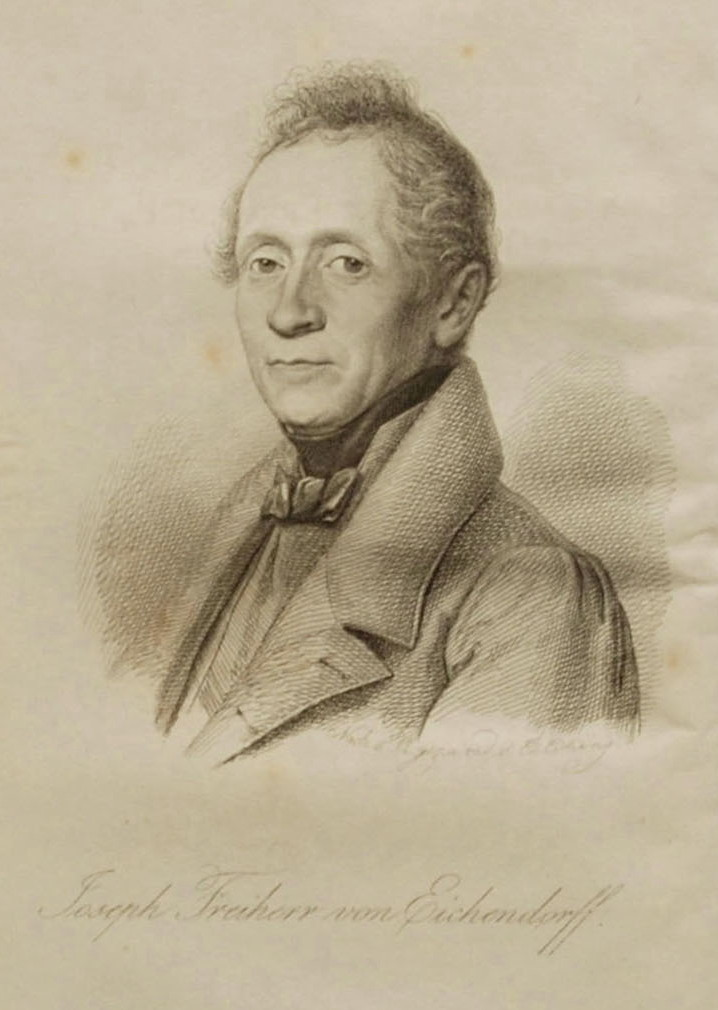
Joseph Freiherr von Eichendorff by Eduard Eichens, 1841

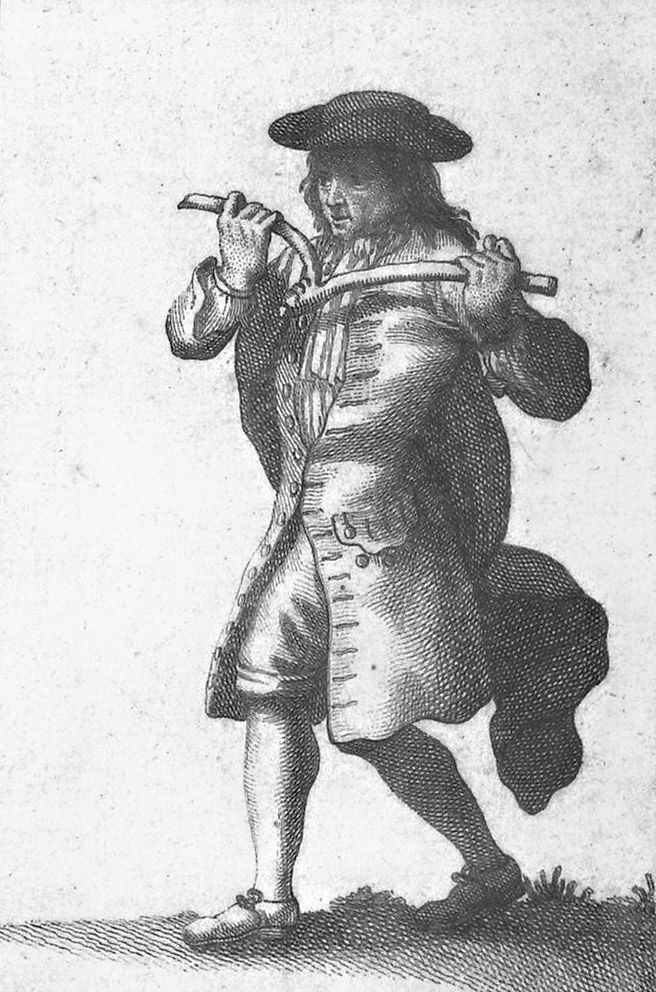
A dowser by Pierre le Brun

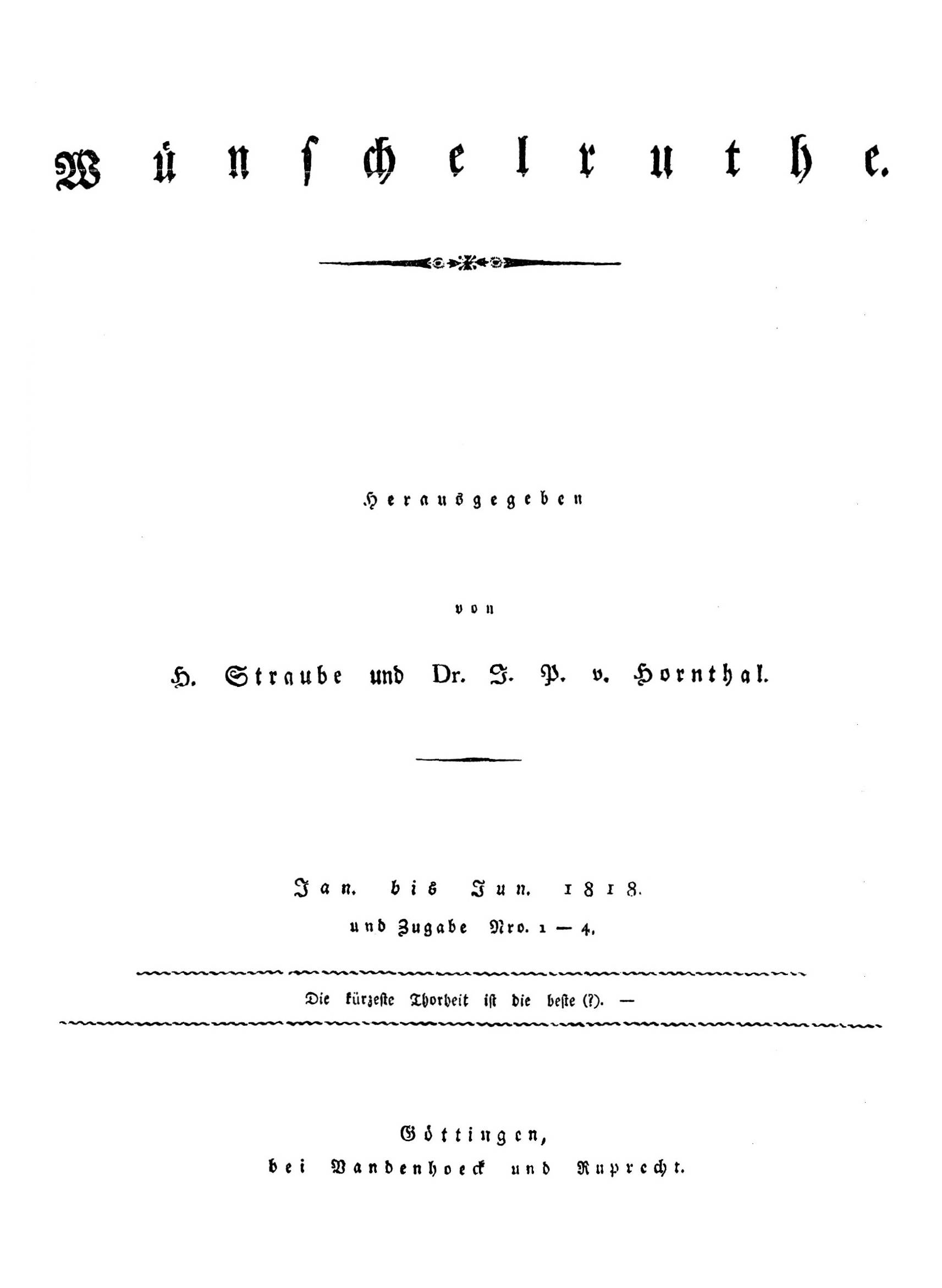
Title of the magazine Wünschelruthe, 1818

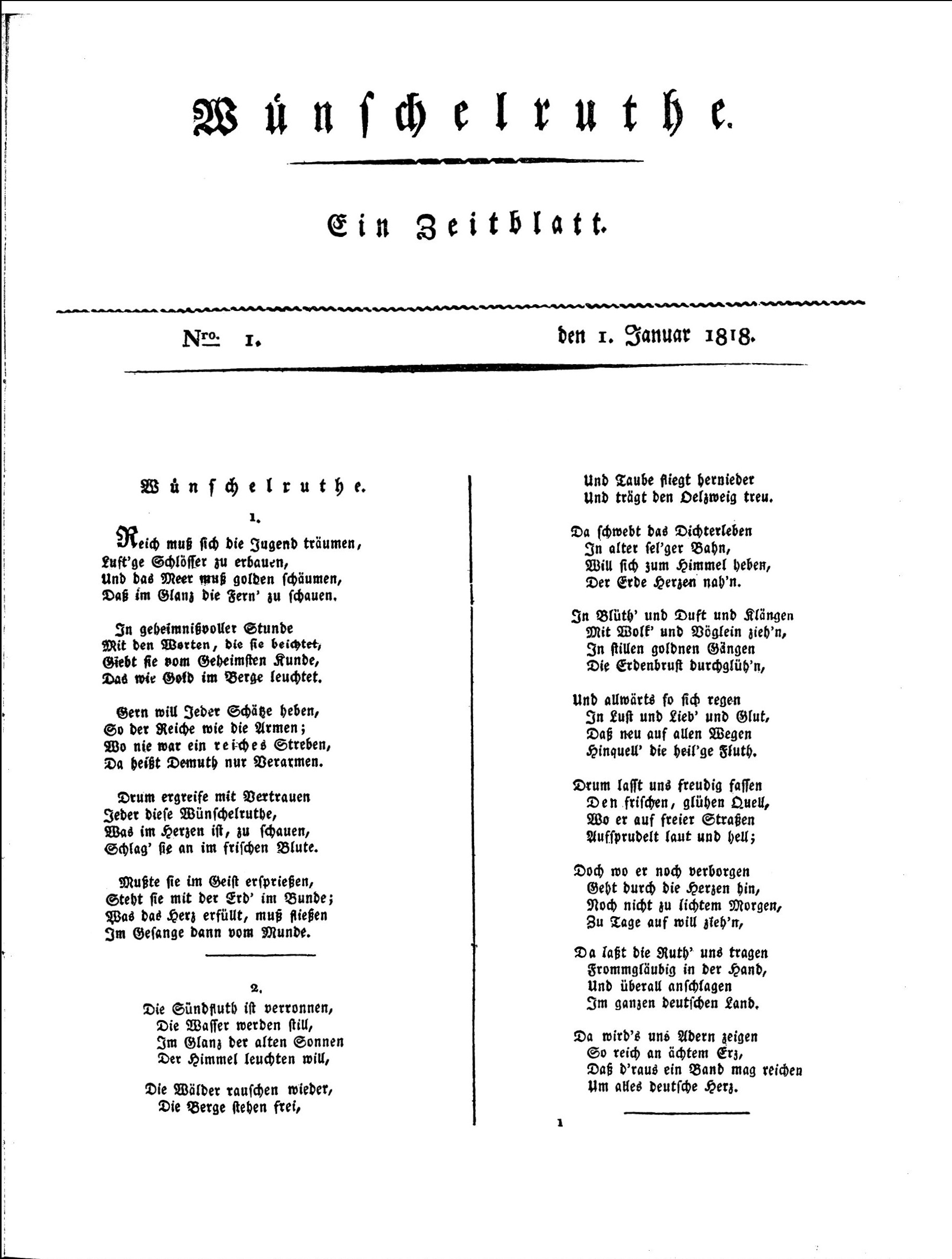
Lead page with editorial poem

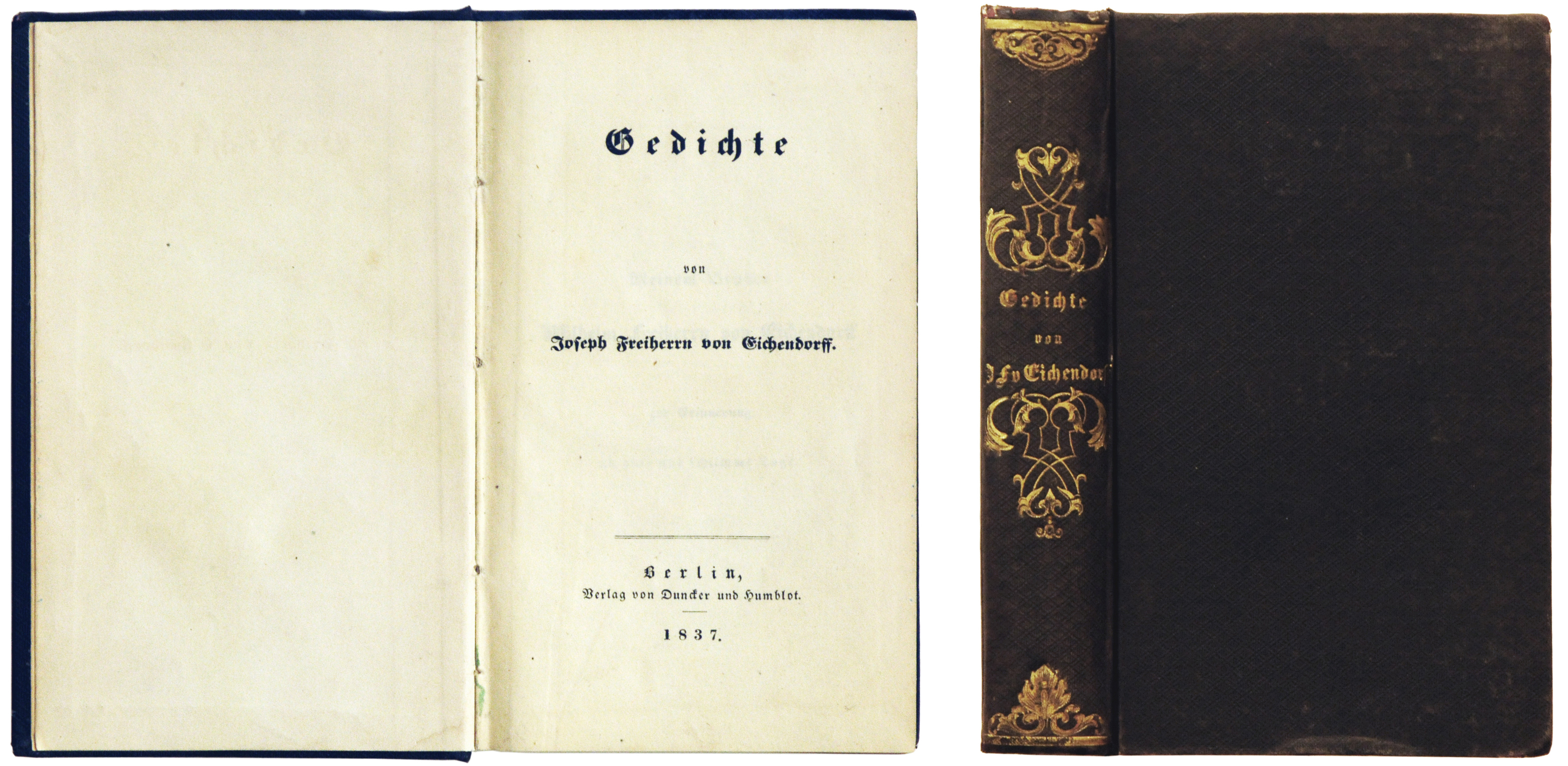
Leaf and golden cover from the first Edition of Eichendorff’s Poems (Gedichte), 1837

"Wünschelrute" ("dowsing rod") is one of the most famous poems by Joseph Freiherr von Eichendorff, major poet of the German Hochromantik ("High Romantics").

== Source text and its translation ==
Wünschelrute
Schläft ein Lied in allen Dingen,
die da träumen fort und fort
und die Welt hebt an zu singen,
triffst du nur das Zauberwort.

Wishing-Wand
A song sleeps in all things around
Which dream on and on unheard,
And the world begins to resound,
If you hit the magic word.
Translated by Natias Neutert

== Versification ==
Rhyming syllables	Rhyme scheme
A song sleeps in all things around Which dream on and on unheard, And the world begins to resound, If you hit the magic word.	A B A B

== Literary-historical classifications ==
=== Timeframe ===
It was written 1835, probably in Berlin, and published 1838 in Deutschen Musenalmanach.

=== Titling ===
The word component Wünschel is a typic Silesian diminutive form of the German noun Wunsch (wish). The other combining word component is -Rute (rod). The connotation of Wünschelrute corresponds perfectly with the inner motif of longing throughout his work, as Natias Neutert points out. insofar „some kind of watermarking of his poetry flow“.

=== Imaginable stimulus ===
Whether Eichendorff knew it or not, is not assured: «Wünschelruthe» (written in the way of those days—with an ‚h’) was the name of a literary magazine with the subtitle Ein Zeitblatt (A Time Sheet), published twice weekly from January to June 1818 in Göttingen in the times of High Romantics. Edited in the name of a student poet circle, named «Poetische Schusterinnung an der Leine» by Heinrich Straube (1794-1847) and Johann Peter von Horn Thal (1794-1864), son of the mayor of Bamberg. Other contributors were Achim von Arnim (1781-1831), Clemens Brentano (1778-1842), Brothers Grimm, Jacob (1785–1863) and Wilhelm Grimm (1786–1859), Ernst Moritz Arndt 1769–1860, and some professors and students of the local university. The magazine contained mainly literary texts, poems and stories, and announcements about the literary scene. Focussed on folk song and saga. It might well be that Eichendorff read it.

== Real object, poetical subject ==
The namegiver of Eichendorff’s poem is the wooden dowsing rod, an instrument used to locate ground water, oil, buried metals or ores, gemstones and many other objects and materials without the use of scientific apparatus. Dowsing is also seen as divining; especially in reference to interpretation of results. Eichendorff used the real Wünschelrute as a metaphor for the faculty of imagination and the "witchcraft" or "magic powers" of poetry. The poet’s relationship to nature is such as those of a singer who has to seek for the hitting word to strike the right note, as Günther Schiwy, holder of the Eichendorff-Medal, characterized it. Neutert marked the poem, by analogy to the magnetic field intensity, as a creation full of „magic field intensity.“

== Set in music ==
Thomas Schubert: Wünschelrute, in: Schläft ein Lied in allen Dingen — Drei Eichendorff-Lieder für mittlere Stimme und Klavier, [2007], Laurentis-Musikverlag (LMV), Frankfurt am Main 2008, p. 11.
