= Memoirs of a Good-for-Nothing =

1823 novella by Joseph von Eichendorff

- First edition, 1826
- Author: Joseph von Eichendorff
- Language: German
- Genre: novella
- Publisher: Vereinsbuchhandlung, Berlin
- Publication date: 1826
- Original text: Memoirs of a Good-for-Nothing at German Wikisource

Memoirs of a Good-for-Nothing (German: Aus dem Leben eines Taugenichts, lit. 'From the life of a good-for-nothing') is a novella by Joseph von Eichendorff. Completed in 1823, it was first printed in 1826. The work is regarded as a pinnacle of musical prose. Eichendorff created an open form with epic and lyrical elements, incorporating several poems and songs in the text. It was first published in English in 1866.

== Plot ==
A miller sends his son away, calling him a good-for-nothing. The young man takes his fiddle along and leaves happily, without a specific destination. Soon two ladies in a carriage, who are interested in his music, take him along to their palace close to Vienna, where he gets a job as a gardener. He falls in love with the younger lady. Promoted to tax collector, he plants flowers in the garden of the tax house instead of potatoes, placing them regularly for his beloved. He plans to make money, but when he sees his beloved with an officer, he realizes that she is not available for him and leaves.

Further travel takes him to Italy, with adventures on the way and in Rome. Back at the palace, several mysteries about identities are revealed, and he can marry his beloved Aurelie, who is not a noble woman but an orphan. The couple are given a house with a garden and vineyards, and they plan a honeymoon in Italy, travelling again.

== Narration ==
The story is told in the first person from the perspective of the young man. The story has fairy-tale elements in its simple and intentionally naive language, unexpected events, and images of romantic landscapes. The young man's "Wanderlust" is motivated externally by his father and internally by his desire for the "weite Welt" ("big, wide world"), fleeing sedentary life. Combining elements of dream and reality, it has been called a "high point of Romantic fiction".

== Legacy ==
The poem "Der Taugenichts" by Gottfried Keller was inspired by the novella.

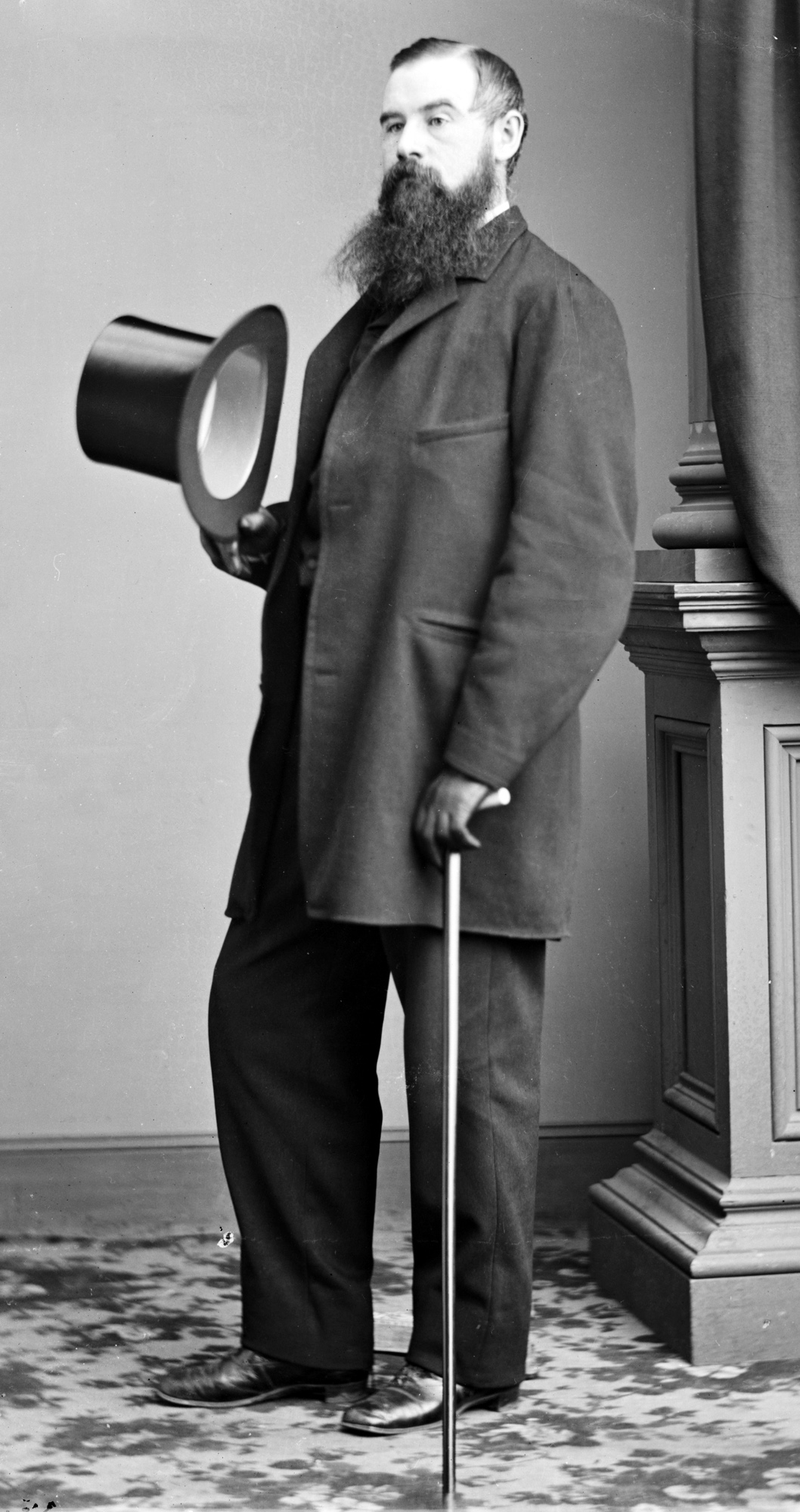
Charles Godfrey Leland, whose translation appeared in 1866

The novella was freely translated to English as Memoirs of a Good-for-Nothing, first by Charles Godfrey Leland, published in New York in 1866 by Leypohlt & Holt. A translation by Bayard Quincy Morgan was published in New York by Ungar in 1955. A translation by Ronald Taylor was first published in 1966 by John Calder Publishers and reprinted in 2015 by Alma Books.

In 1957, an audio play was produced by Bayerischer Rundfunk, adapted by Hellmut von Cube and directed by Gert Westphal, with music by Bernd Scholz and speakers Erik Schumann, Gustl Halenke, Max Mairich, Kurt Horwitz, among others.

The novella has been the basis for three films. Good-for-Nothing is a 1922 silent film directed by Carl Froelich. Excerpts from the Life of a Good-For-Nothing is a 1973 free adaptation by DEFA, directed by Celino Bleiweiß with Dean Reed as the Taugenichts. The Rome episode was cut, possibly to avoid nurturing any desires to travel by residents of the GDR. Good-for-Nothing is a 1978 coproduction with television, directed by Bernhard Sinkel with Jacques Breuer in the title role and music by Hans Werner Henze. It was broadcast several times on ZDF and was awarded the Deutscher Filmpreis in 1978.

== Editions ==
=== First edition ===
Joseph von Eichendorff: Aus dem Leben eines Taugenichts und das Marmorbild. Zwei Novellen nebst einem Anhange von Liedern und Romanzen. Berlin: Vereinsbuchhandlung 1826, 278 pages, plus 3 without page numbers for advertisement of the publisher.

=== Later editions ===
- Joseph von Eichendorff: Aus dem Leben eines Taugenichts. Hamburger Lesehefte Verlag, Husum 2016, ISBN 978-3-87291-004-2 (= 5th Hamburger Leseheft).
- Joseph von Eichendorff: Aus dem Leben eines Taugenichts. Novelle. Anaconda, Cologne 2006, ISBN 978-3-86647-051-4.
- Joseph von Eichendorff: Aus dem Leben eines Taugenichts, edited by Max Kämper. Reclam, Stuttgart 2015, ISBN 978-3-15-019238-2 (= Reclam XL, Band 19238: Text und Kontext).
- Joseph von Eichendorff: Aus dem Leben eines Taugenichts. Novelle. Ed. Joseph Kiermeier-Debre. dtv, Munich 1997, ISBN 978-3-423-02605-5 (= dtv 2605: Bibliothek der Erstausgaben).
- Joseph von Eichendorff: Aus dem Leben eines Taugenichts. Novelle. Commentary by Peter Höfle. Suhrkamp, Frankfurt am Main 2006, ISBN 978-3-518-18882-8 (= Suhrkamp-BasisBibliothek, Vol. 82).
