= Joseph Freiherr von Eichendorff =

German poet and novelist (1788–1857)

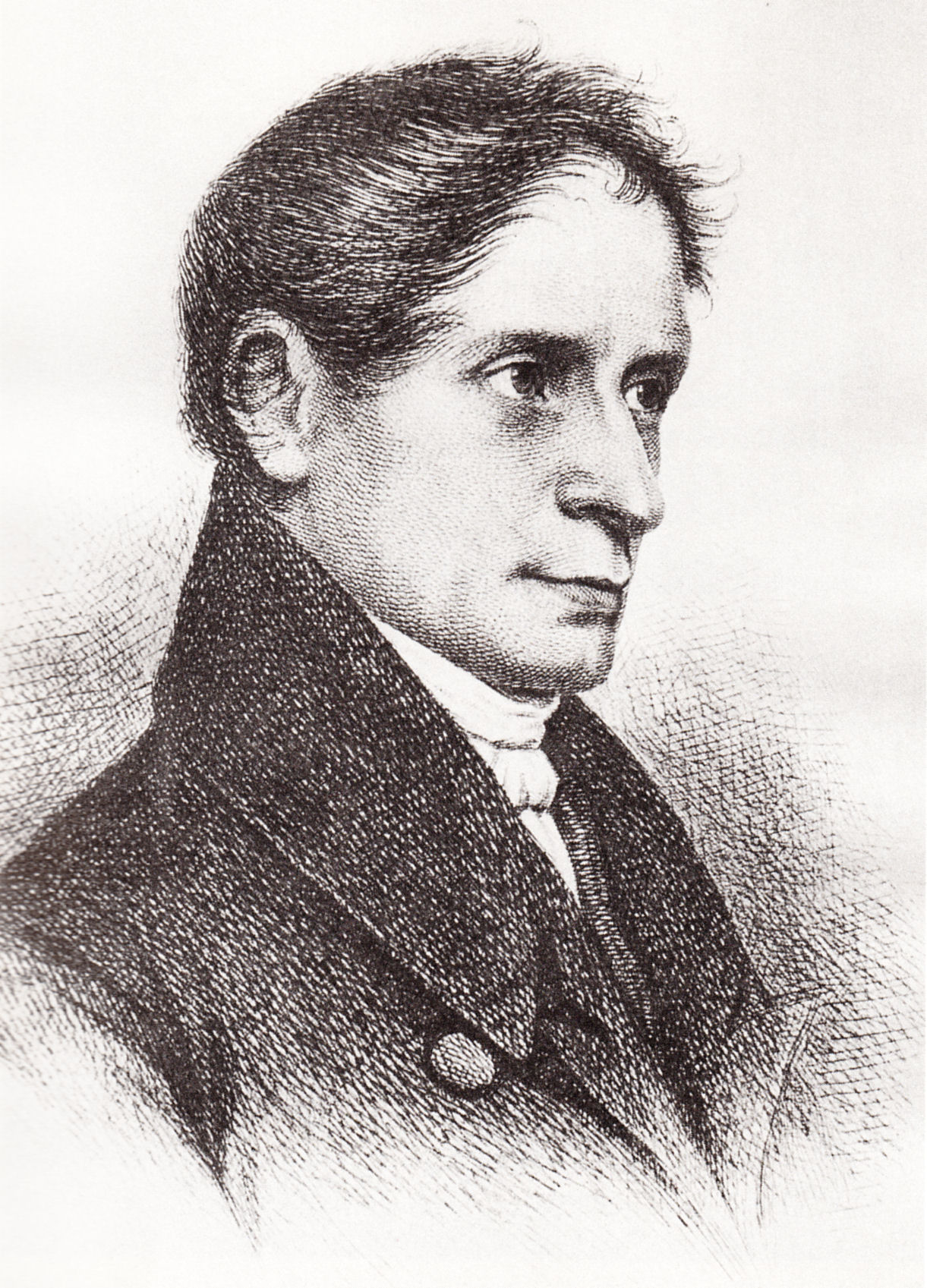
- 1832 portrait
- Born: Joseph Karl Benedikt Freiherr von Eichendorff; 10 March 1788; Lubowitz, Prussian Silesia, Kingdom of Prussia
- Died: 26 November 1857 (aged 69); Neiße, Prussian Silesia, Kingdom of Prussia
- Education: Heidelberg University
- Occupations: Novelist, poet, essayist
- Writing career
- Genres: Novellas, poetry
- Notable works: Memoirs of a Good-for-Nothing, The Marble Statue
- Movement: Romanticism

Joseph Karl Benedikt Freiherr von Eichendorff (German: [fɔn ˈaɪçn̩dɔʁf]; 10 March 1788 – 26 November 1857) was a German poet, novelist, playwright, literary critic, translator, and anthologist. Eichendorff was one of the major writers and critics of Romanticism. Ever since their publication and up to the present day, some of his works have been very popular in German-speaking Europe.

Eichendorff first became famous for his 1826 novella Aus dem Leben eines Taugenichts (freely translated: Memoirs of a Good-for-Nothing) and his poems. The Memoirs of a Good-for-Nothing is a typical Romantic novella whose main themes are wanderlust and love. The protagonist, the son of a miller, rejects his father's trade and becomes a gardener at a Viennese palace where he subsequently falls in love with the local duke's daughter. As, with his lowly status, she is unattainable for him, he escapes to Italy – only to return and learn that she is the duke's adopted daughter, and thus within his social reach. With its combination of dream world and realism, Memoirs of a Good-for-Nothing is considered to be a high point of Romantic fiction. One critic stated that Eichendorff's Good-for-Nothing is the "personification of love of nature and an obsession with hiking." Thomas Mann called Eichendorff's Good-for-Nothing a combination of "the purity of the folk song and the fairy tale."

Many of Eichendorff's poems were first published as integral parts of his novellas and stories, where they are often performed in song by one of the protagonists. The novella Good-for-Nothing alone contains 54 poems.

== Biography ==
=== Origin and early youth ===
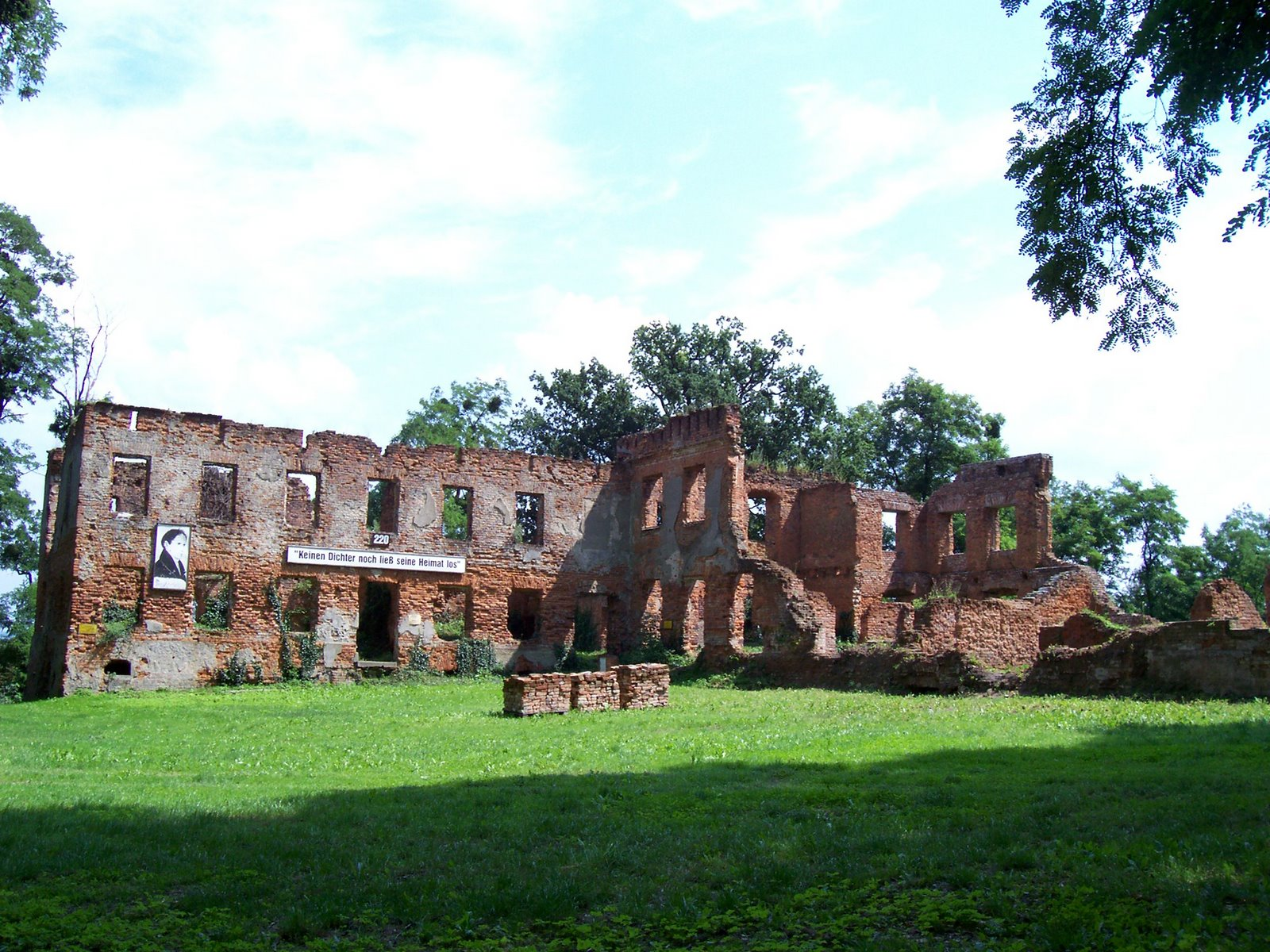
Lubowitz Castle, Eichendorff's birthplace

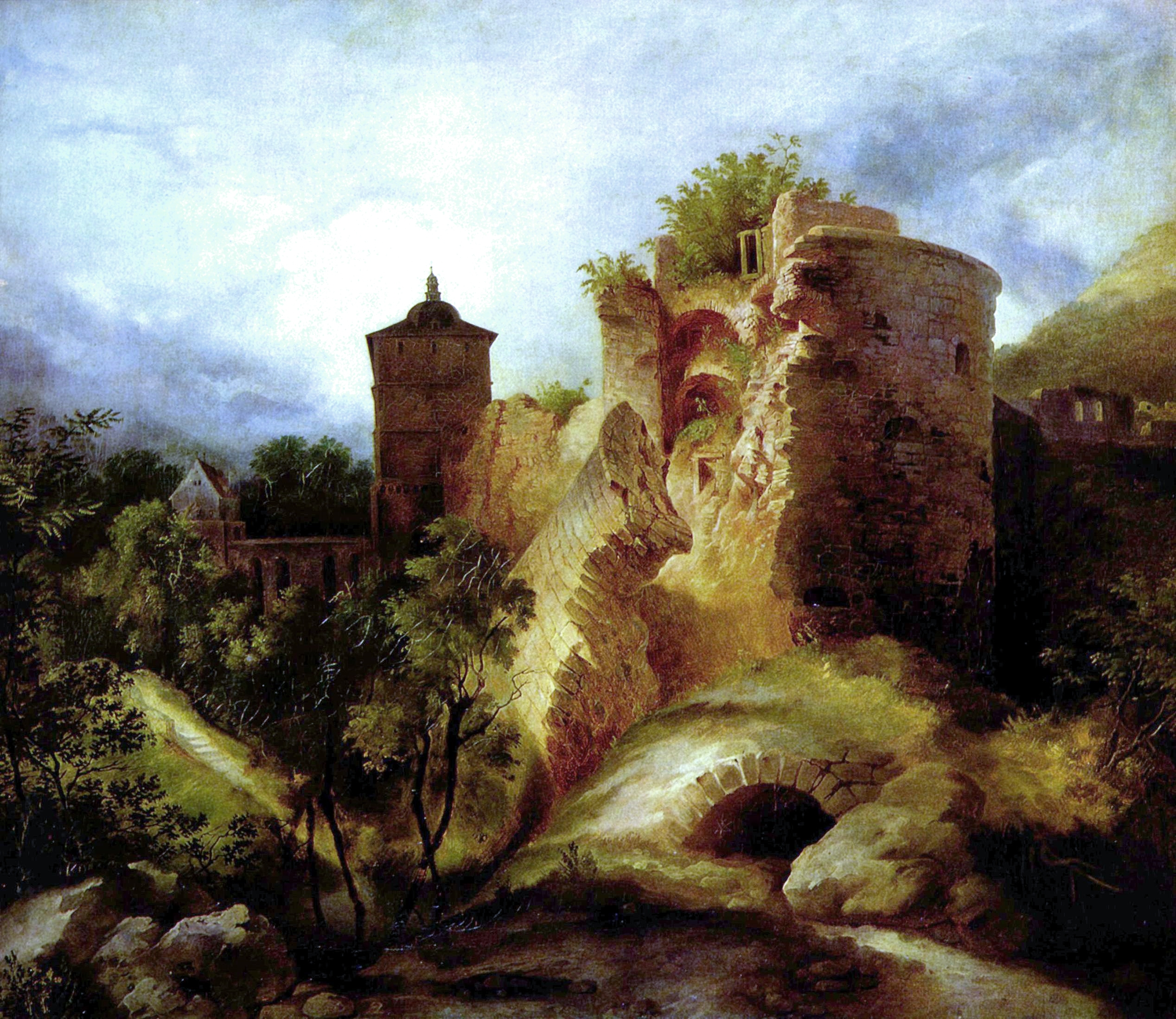
Heidelberg Castle by Carl Blechen, 1829

Eichendorff, a descendant of an old noble family, was born in 1788 at Lubowitz Castle in Lubowitz near Ratibor in Upper Silesia, at that time part of the Kingdom of Prussia (now Łubowice near Racibórz, Poland). His parents were the Prussian officer Adolf Freiherr von Eichendorff (1756–1818) and his wife, Karoline née Freiin von Kloche (1766–1822), who came from an aristocratic Roman Catholic family. Eichendorff sold the family estates in Deutsch-Krawarn, Kauthen, and Wrbkau and acquired Lubowitz Castle from his mother-in-law. The castle's Rococo reconstruction, which was begun by her, was very expensive and almost bankrupted the family. Young Joseph was close to his older brother Wilhelm (1786–1849). From 1793 to 1801, they were home-schooled by tutor Bernhard Heinke. Joseph began writing diaries as early as 1798, witnesses to his budding literary career. The diaries present many insights into the development of the young writer, ranging from simple statements about the weather to notes about finances to early poems. At a young age, Eichendorff was already well aware of his parents' financial straits. On 19 June 1801, the thirteen-year old noted in his diary: "Father travelled to Breslau, on the run from his creditors," adding on 24 June, "mom become terribly faint." With his brother Wilhelm, Joseph attended the Catholic Matthias Gymnasium in Breslau (1801–1804). While previously preferring chapbooks, he was now introduced to the poetry of Matthias Claudius and Voltaire's La Henriade, an epic poem about the last part of the wars of religion and Henry IV of France in ten songs. In 1804 his sister Luise Antonie Nepomucene Johanna was born (died 1883), who was to become a friend of Austrian writer Adalbert Stifter. After their final exams, both brothers attended lectures at the University of Breslau and the Protestant Maria-Magdalena-Gymnasium. Eichendorff's diary from this time shows that he valued formal education much less than the theatre, recording 126 plays and concerts visited. His love for Mozart also goes back to these days. Joseph himself seems to have been a talented actor and his brother Wilhelm a good singer and guitar player.

=== College days ===
Together with his brother Wilhelm, Joseph studied law and the humanities in Halle an der Saale (1805–1806), a city near Jena, which was a focal point of the Frühromantik (Early Romantics). The brothers frequently attended the theatre of Lauchstädt, 13 km where the Weimar court theatrical company performed plays by Goethe. In October 1806 Napoleon's troops took Halle and teaching at the university ceased. To complete their studies, Wilhelm and Joseph went to the University of Heidelberg in 1807, another important centre of Romanticism. Here Eichendorff befriended romantic poet Otto Heinrich von Loeben (1786–1825), met Achim von Arnim (1781–1831) and possibly Clemens Brentano (1778–1842). In Heidelberg, Eichendorff heard lectures by Joseph Görres, a leading member of the Heidelberg Romantic group, a "hermitic magician" and "formative impression", as Eichendorff later explained. In 1808 the brothers finished their degrees, after which they undertook an educational journey to Paris, Vienna, and Berlin. In Berlin they came into closer contact with Romantic writers such as Clemens Brentano, Adam Müller, and Heinrich von Kleist. To further their professional prospects, they travelled to Vienna in 1810, where they concluded their studies with a state examination diploma. Wilhelm procured employment in the Austrian civil service, while Joseph went back home to help his father with managing the estate.

=== Love affairs ===
From Eichendorff's diaries we know about his love for a girl, Amalie Schaffner, and another love affair in 1807–08 during his student days in Heidelberg with one Käthchen Förster. His deep sorrow about the unrequitted love for the nineteen-year-old daughter of a cellarman inspired Eichendorff to one of his most famous poems, Das zerbrochene Ringlein (The Broken Ring).

=== Military service ===
In his deep desperation over this unhappy infatuation, Eichendorff craved death in military exploits as mentioned in his poem Das zerbrochene Ringlein:

Ich möchte’ als Reiter fliegen
Wohl in die blut’ge Schlacht,
Um stille Feuer liegen
Im Feld bei dunkler Nacht.

Translation:

I fain would mount a charger
And glory seek in fight,
By silent camp-fires lying,
When falls the dark of night.

— Translated by Geoffrey Herbert Chase

Although Chase's translation weakens the second line from blut’ge Schlacht (bloody battle) to "in fight" this, actually, happens to be much closer to the historical truth, since Eichendorff's participation in the Lützow Free Corps seems to be a myth – in spite of some authorities asserting the contrary.

In 1813, when conflict flared up again, Eichendorff tried to join the struggle against Napoleon, however he lacked the funds to purchase a uniform, gun, or horse, and, when he finally managed to get the money necessary, the war was all but over.

=== Betrothal, marriage and family life ===
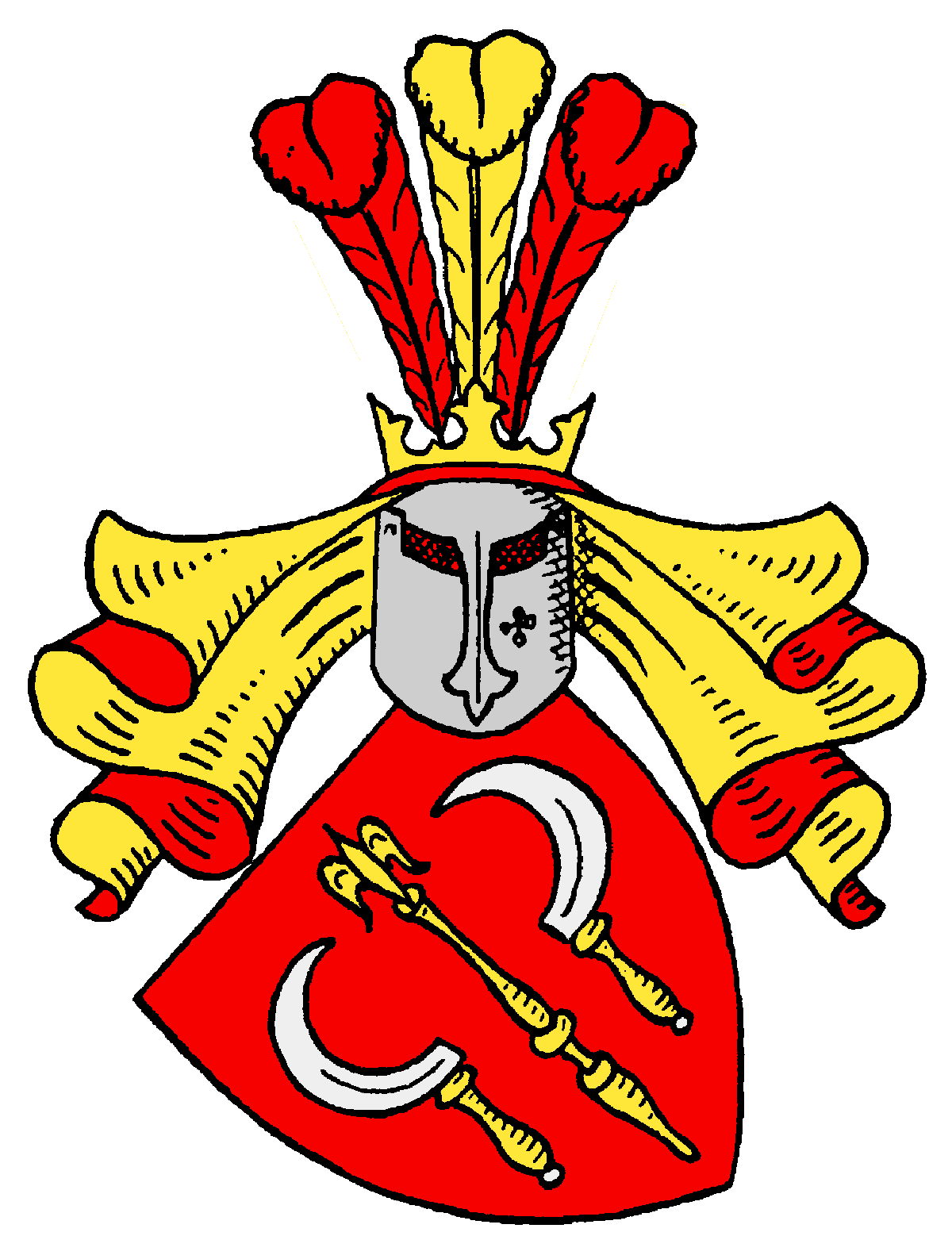
Family arms of von Larisch

His parents, to save the indebted family estate, hoped that Eichendorff would marry a wealthy heiress, however he fell in love with Aloysia von Larisch (1792–1855), called 'Luise', the seventeen-year-old daughter of a prominent, yet impoverished Catholic family of nobles. The betrothal took place in 1809, the same year Eichendorff went to Berlin to take up a profession there. In 1815, the couple was married in Breslau's St. Vinzenz church and that same year Eichendorff's son Hermann was born, followed in 1819 by their daughter Therese. In 1818, Eichendorff's father died and in 1822 his mother. The death of his mother resulted in the final loss of all the family's estates in Silesia.

=== Child mortality ===
During the period, infant mortality was very high. Both Eichendorff's brother Gustav (born 1800) and his sister Louise Antonie (born 1799) died in 1803 at a very young age, as did two of Eichendorff's daughters between 1822 and 1832. The poet expressed the parental sorrow after this loss in the famous cycle "Auf meines Kindes Tod". One of the poems in this series conveys an especially powerful sense of loss in this era:

Die Winde nur noch gehen
Wehklagend um das Haus,
Wir sitzen einsam drinnen
Und lauschen oft hinaus.

Translation:

Only the winds are wandering
Around the house and moan,
And by the window harking
We sit inside, alone.

— Translated by Margarete Münsterberg

=== Travels of a transferee ===
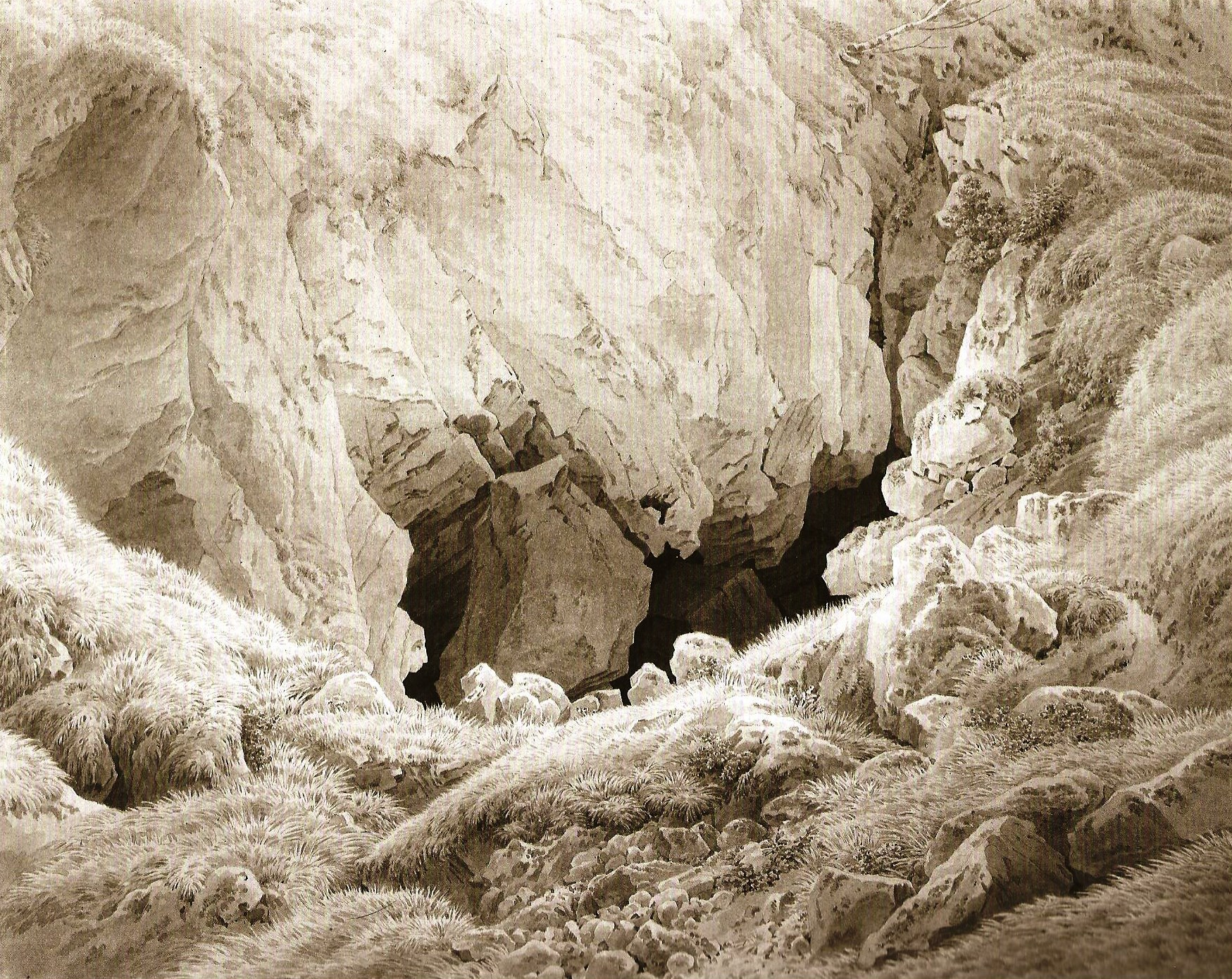
Cave in the Harz Mountains, Caspar David Friedrich, sepia, c. 1811

With his literary figure of the Good-for-Nothing Eichendorff created the paradigm of the wanderer. The motif itself had been central to romanticism since Wilhelm Heinrich Wackenroder and Ludwig Tieck undertook their famous Pfingstwanderung (Whitsun excursion) in the Fichtel Mountains in 1793, an event that began the Romantic movement. Travels through Germany, Austria, and France rounded off Eichendorff's education, however, he himself was not much of a hiker. Apart from some extensive marches on foot during his school and college days (for example from Halle to Leipzig, to see popular actor Iffland), he only undertook one lengthy tour, traversing for seventeen days the Harz mountains with his brother in 1805, a trip partly undertaken using the stagecoach, as witnessed by his diary. Eichendorff was less of a romantic wanderer, but rather displaced again and again by changes of location necessitated by his official activities. The following trips, mainly undertaken by coach or boat, are documented:

- 1794 Prague.
- 1799 Karlsbad and Prague
- 1805/1806 Harz, Hamburg, Lübeck
- 1807 Linz, Regensburg, Nürnberg
- 1808/1809 via Strasbourg, Burgundy, Lothringen, and the Champagne to Paris, a month later from Heidelberg to Frankfurt, and from there on a mailboat via Aschaffenburg, Würzburg, Nürnberg, Regensburg to Vienna,
- 1809/1810 Berlin,
- 1813 Neustadt O.S. (Prudnik),
- 1814 Berlin,
- 1816 Breslau,
- 1819 Berlin,
- 1820 Vienna,
- 1821 Danzig,
- 1823 Berlin,
- 1824 Königsberg,
- 1831 Berlin,
- 1838 Munich and Vienna,
- 1843 Danzig,
- 1846/1847 Vienna,
- 1847 Danzig and Berlin,
- 1848 Köthen and Dresden,
- 1849 Berlin,
- 1855 Neiße (Nysa).

=== Eichendorff as civil servant ===
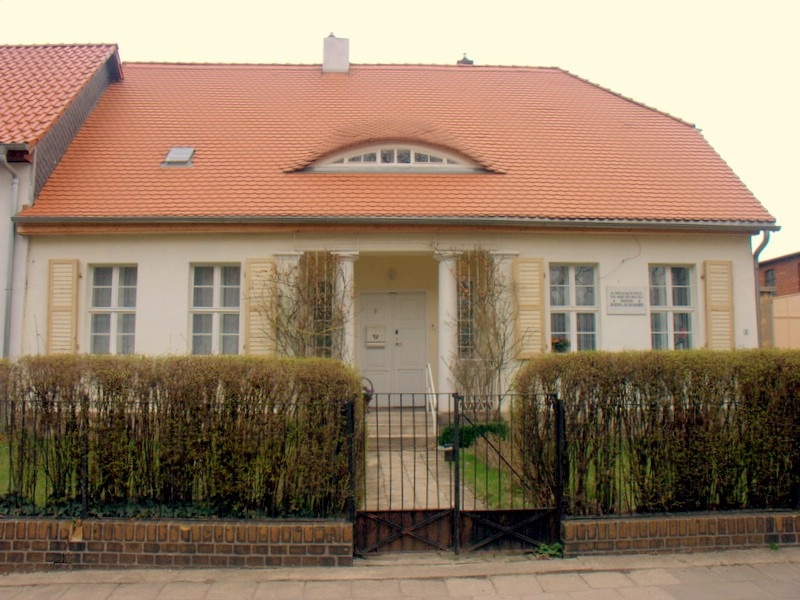
Eichendorff residence in Köthen, where he lived from April to October 1855

Eichendorff worked in various capacities as Prussian government administrator. His career began in 1816 as unpaid clerk in Breslau. In November 1819, he was appointed assessor and in 1820 consistorial councilor for West and East Prussia in Danzig, with an initial annual salary of 1200 thalers. In April 1824, Eichendorff was relocated to Königsberg as "Oberpräsidialrat" (chief administrator) with an annual salary of 1600 thalers. In 1821, Eichendorff was appointed school inspector and, in 1824, "Oberpräsidialrat" in Königsberg. In 1831, he moved his family to Berlin, where he worked as Privy Councilor for the Foreign Ministry until his retirement in 1844.

=== Death and burial ===
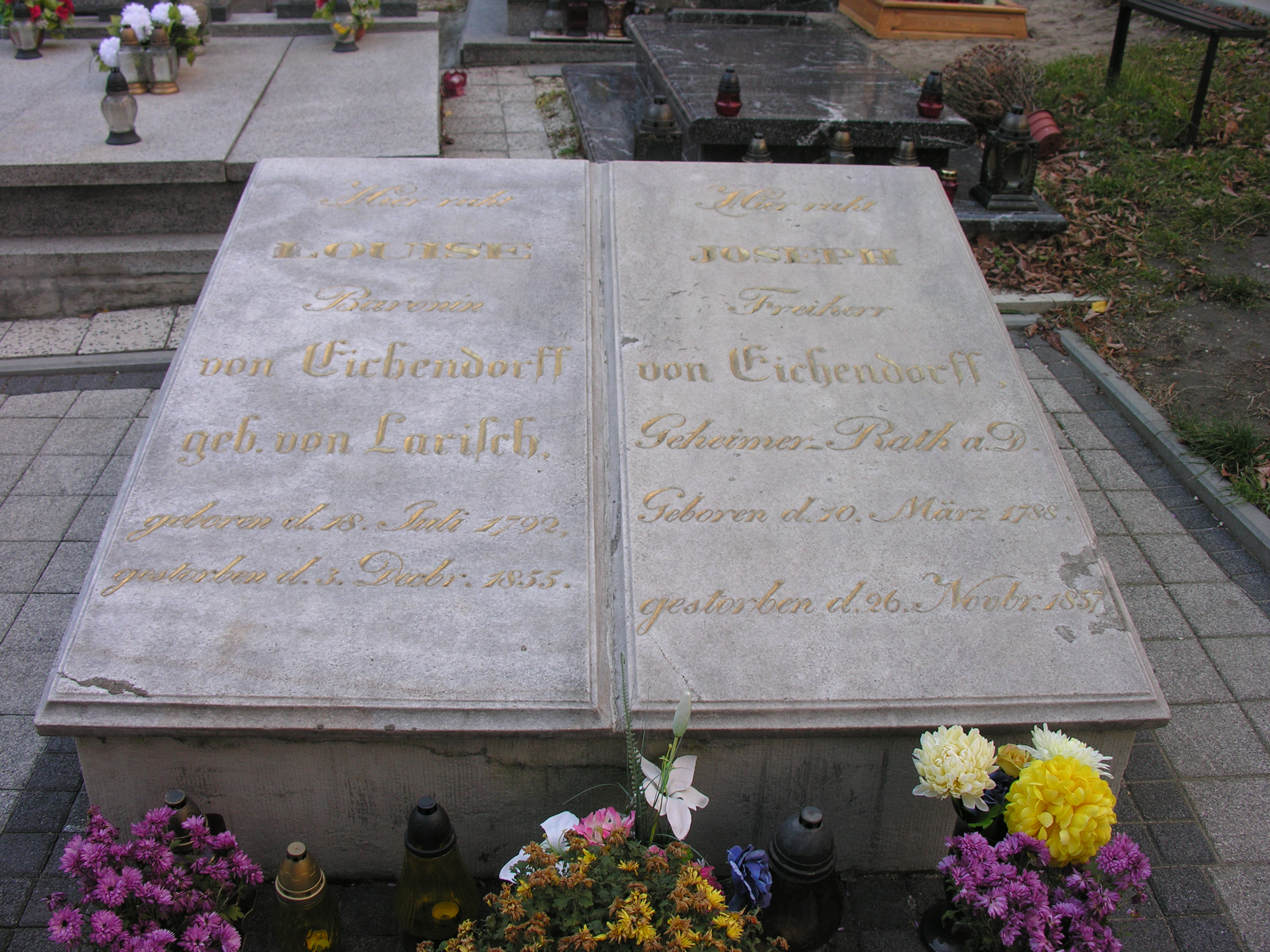
Grave of Joseph von Eichendorff in Nysa, Poland

Eichendorff's brother Wilhelm died in 1849 in Innsbruck. That same year, there was a Republican uprising and the Eichendorffs fled to Meißen and Köthen, where a little house was purchased for his daughter Therese (now a von Besserer-Dahlfingen) in 1854. In 1855, he was much affected by the death of his wife. In September he traveled to Sedlnitz for the christening of his grandchild. Shortly after he made his very last trip, dying of pneumonia on 26 November 1857 in Neiße (now Nysa, Poland). He was buried the next day with his wife.

== Growth of a Romanticist ==
=== Artistic influences ===
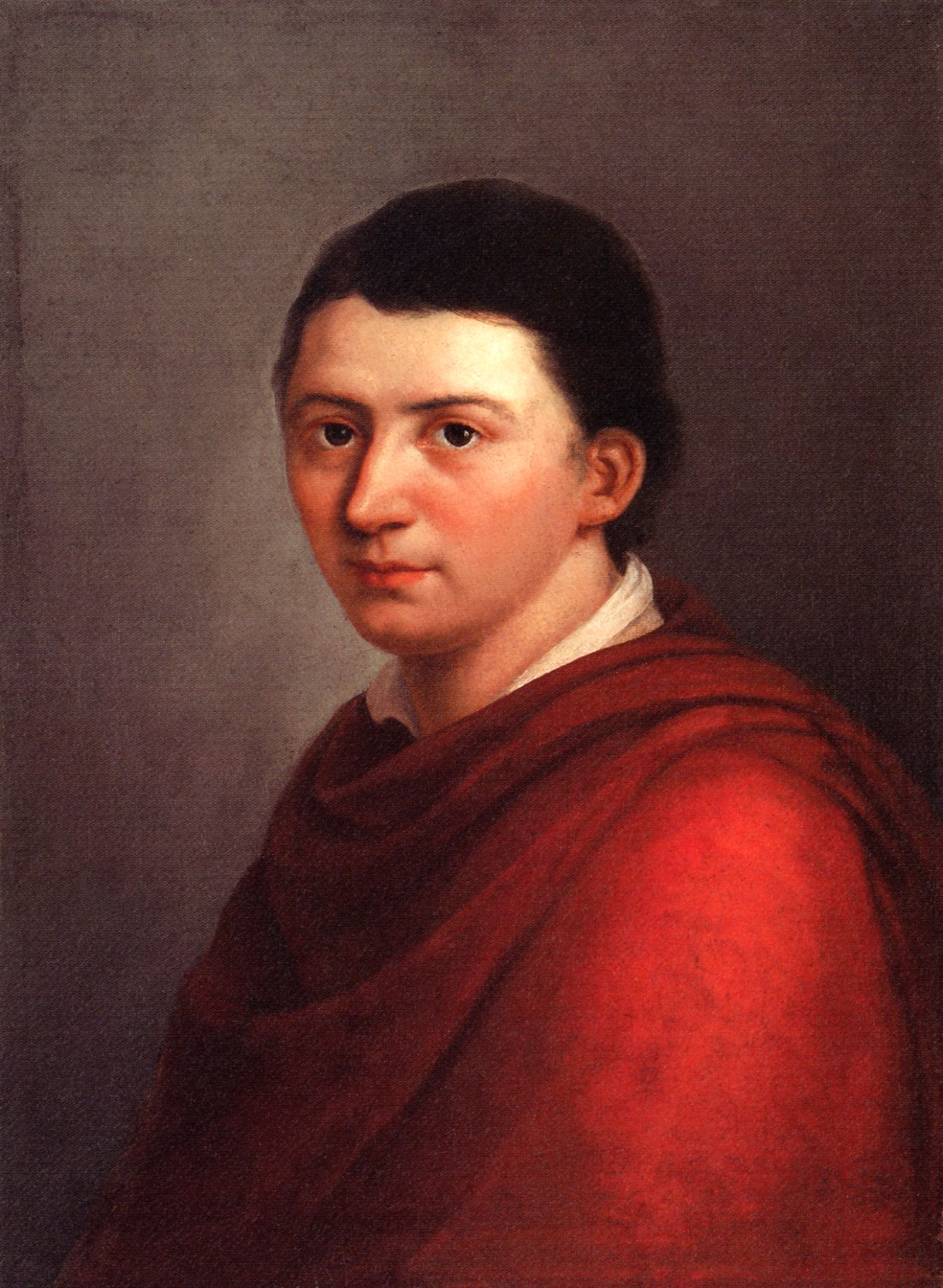
Friedrich Schlegel, painting by Franz Gareis, 1801

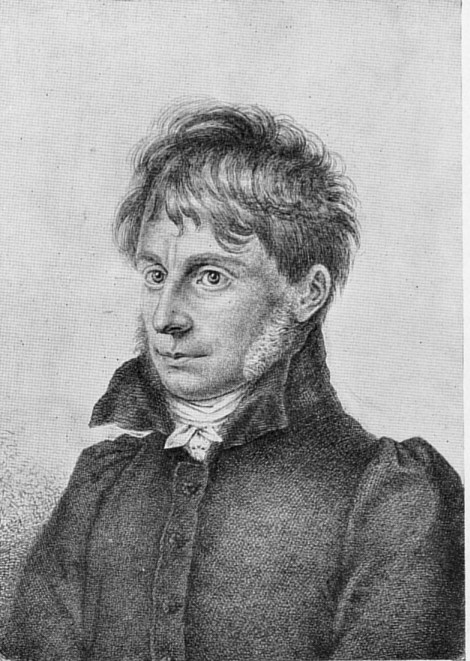
Josef Görres by August Strixner, lithograph (after a painting by Peter von Cornelius)

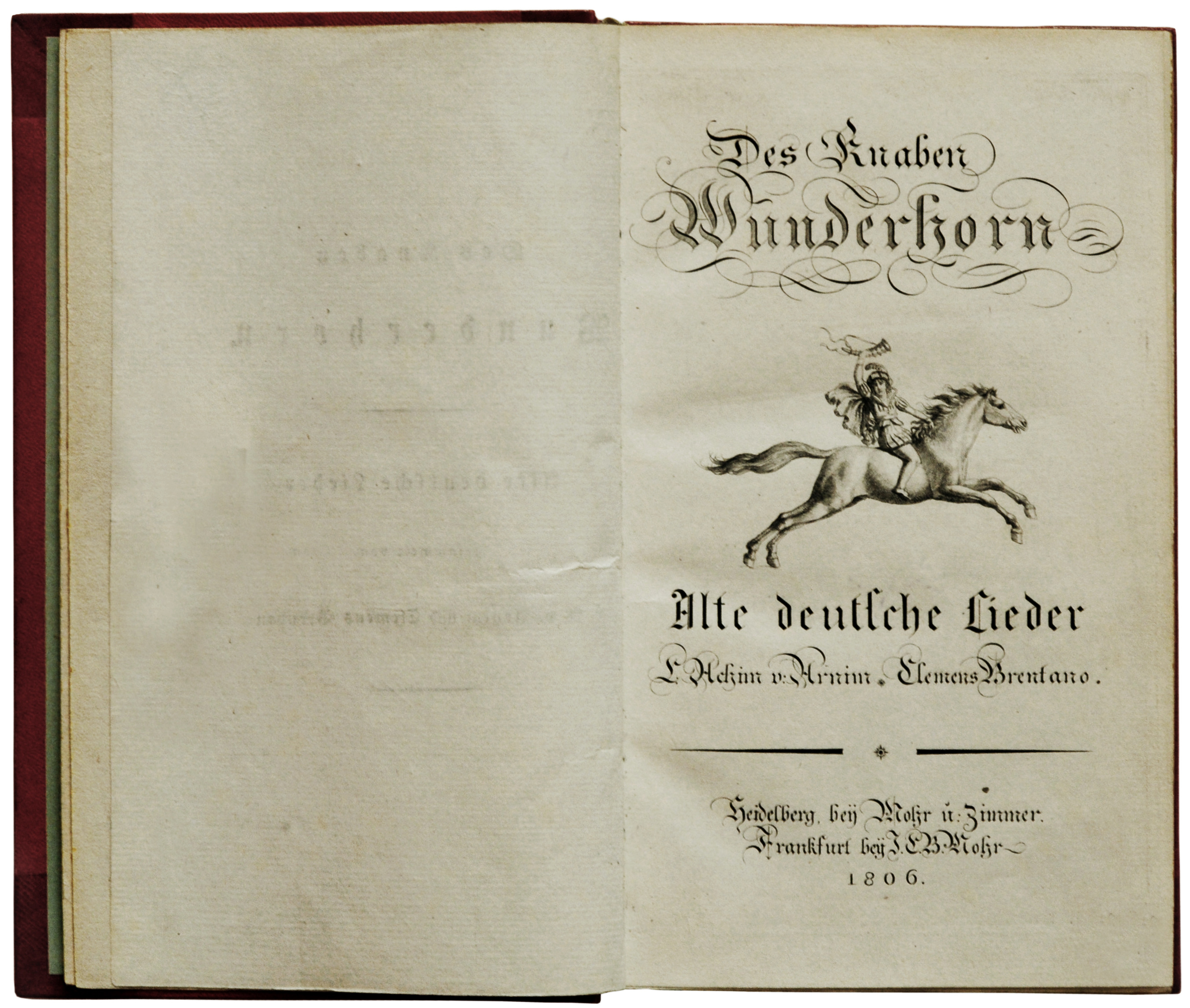
Title page of Des Knaben Wunderhorn, 1806, a major influence on Eichendorff's poetry

The two writers who had the greatest early influence on Eichendorff's artistic development were Friedrich Schlegel, who established the term romantisch (romantic) in German literature, and Joseph Görres. While the writers who gathered around Schlegel inclined more to philosophy and aesthetic theory, the adherents of Görres became mainly known as writers of poetry and stories. Both movements, however, greatly influenced intellectual life in Germany by emphasising the individual, the subjective, the irrational, the imaginative, the personal, the spontaneous, the emotional, the visionary, and the transcendental over classical precepts. One of their fundamental ideas was the "unity of poetry and life".

Eichendorff shared Schlegel's view that the world was a naturally and eternally "self-forming artwork", Eichendorff himself used the metaphor that "nature [was] a great picture book, which the good Lord has pitched for us outside." Arnim's and Brentano's studies and interpretations of the Volkslied (folk song) deeply influenced Eichendorff's own poetry and poetology.

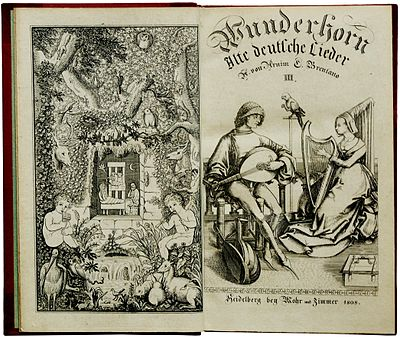
Title page of third edition of Des Knaben Wunderhorn, 1808

Arnim's and Brentano's anthology Des Knaben Wunderhorn: Alte deutsche Lieder, a collection of songs about love, soldiers, wandering, as well as children's songs, was an important source for the Romantic movement. Similar to other early 19th-century anthologists such as Thomas Percy, Arnim and Brentano edited and rewrote the poems in they collected. "Everything in the world happens because of poetry, to live life with an increased sense and history is the expression of this general poetry of the human race, the fate performs this great spectacle," is what Arnim said in a letter to Brentano (9 July 1802).

== Eichendorff's poetical style ==
=== Range ===
Although Eichendorffs poetry includes many metric forms ranging from very simple elegiac couplets and stanzas to sonnets, his main artistic focus was on poems imitating folk songs. A comparison of forms shows that Eichendorff's lyricism is "directly influenced by Brentano and Arnim".

=== Naturalness and artificiality ===
Following the model of Des Knaben Wunderhorn, Eichendorff uses simple words ('naturalness'), adding more meaning ('artificiality') than dictionary definitions would indicate. In this sense, "His words are rich in connotative power, in imaginative appeal and in sound."

=== Emblematic imagery ===
Certain expressions and formulas used by Eichendorff, which are sometimes characterised by critics as pure cliché, actually represent a conscious reduction in favour of emblematics. In Görres' poetology "nature is speaking" us. But before it can happen, the wonderful song sleeping in each thing must be woken up by the poet's word: One notable example used by Eichendorff is the Zauberwort (magic word) – and one of Eichendorff's most celebrated poems, the four-line stanza Wünschelrute (divining rod), is about finding such a Zauberwort:

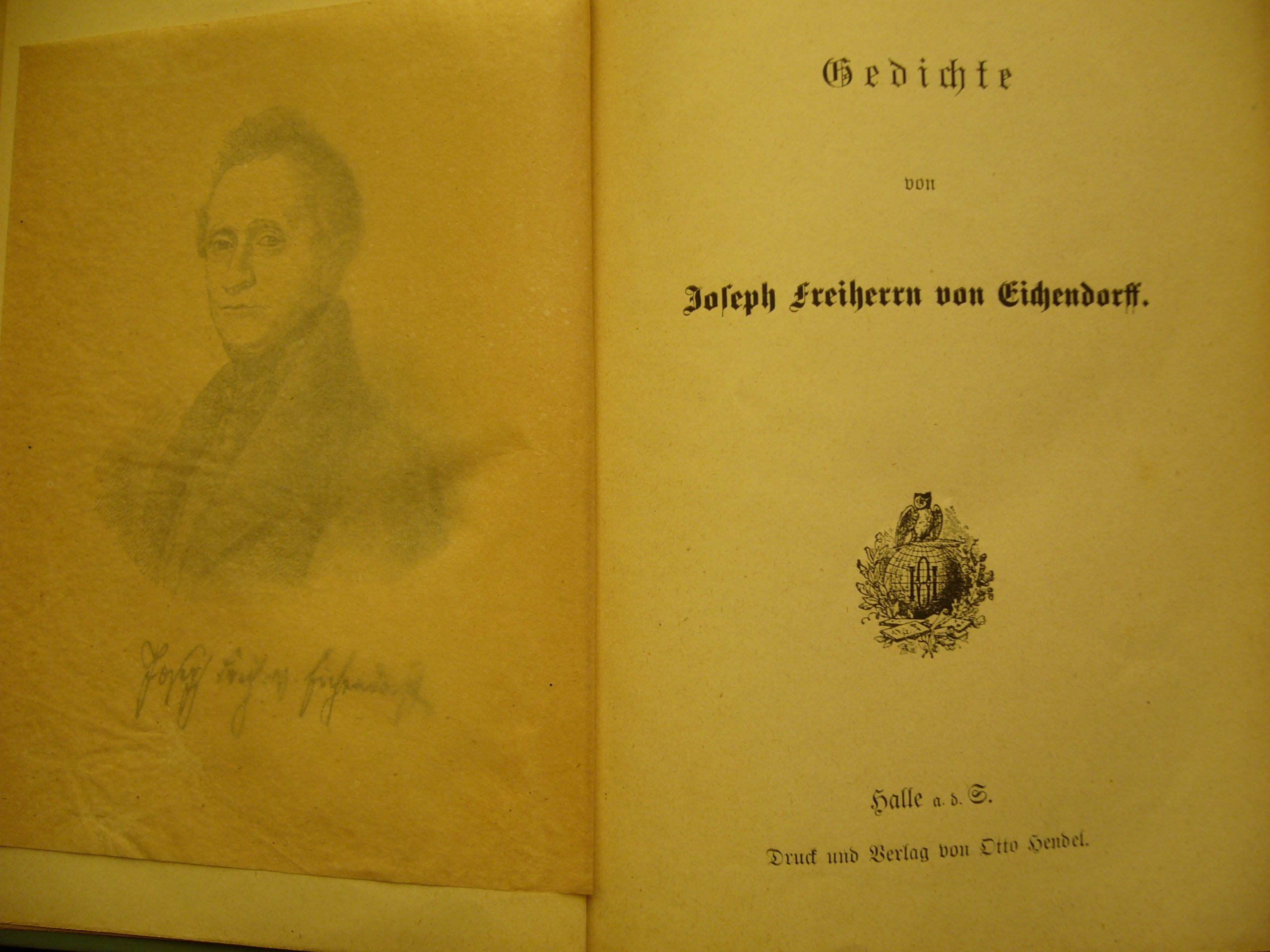
Title page of Eichendorff's Gedichte (Poems), Halle, about 1907

Wünschelrute

Schläft ein Lied in allen Dingen,
die da träumen fort und fort,
und die Welt hebt an zu singen,
triffst du nur das Zauberwort.

Translation:
Wishing Wand

A song sleeps in all things around
Which dream on and on unheard,
And the world begins to resound,
If you hit the magic word.

— Translated by Natias Neutert

=== Main motifs ===
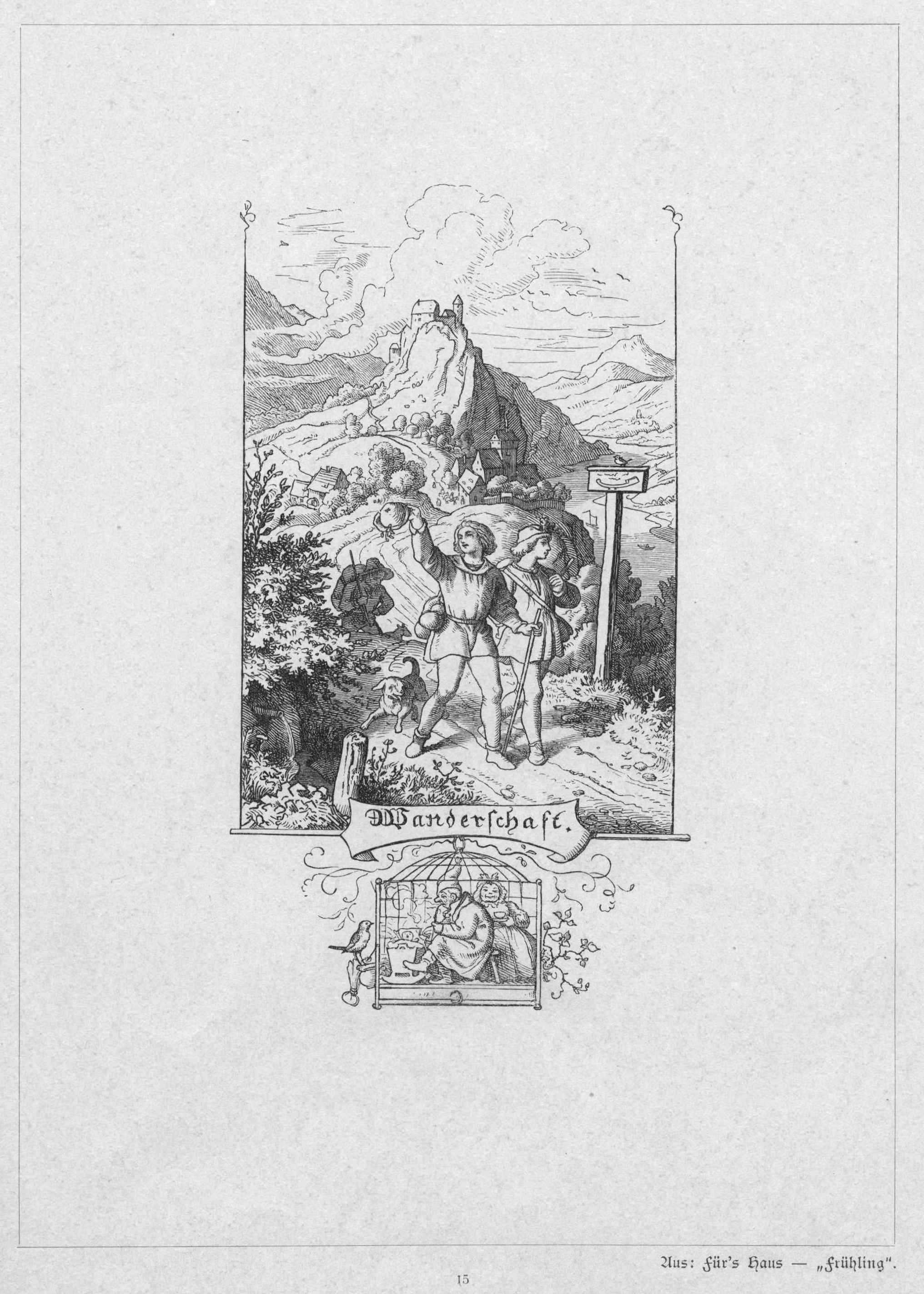
Wanderschaft by Ludwig Richter, illustration for Eichendorff's poem The Happy Wanderer, woodcut 1858–61

The titles of Eichendorff's poems show that, besides the motif of wandering, the two other main motifs of his poetry were the passing of time (transience) and nostalgia. Time, for Eichendorff, is not just a natural phenomenon but, as Marcin Worbs elaborated: "Each day and each of our nights has a metaphysical dimension." The morning, on the other hand, evokes the impression that "all nature had been created just in this very moment," while the evening often acts as a mysterium mortis with the persona pondering transience and death.

Eichendorff's other main motif, nostalgia, is described by some critic as a phenomenon of infinity. However, there is a number of different interpretations. According to Helmut Illbruck: The "simple-minded Taugenichts (...) feels continually homesick and can never come to rest." Katja Löhr distinguishes between nostalgia as an emotion consisting of two components — longing and melancholy: "The inner emotion of longing is to long for, the inner emotion of melancholy is to mourn. As an expression of deep reflection, longing corresponds with intuition (Ahnen), grieving with memory." Theodor W. Adorno, who set out to rescue Eichendorff from his misled conservative admirers, attested: "He was not a poet of the homeland, but rather a poet of homesickness". In sharp contrast, Natias Neutert saw in Eichendorff's nostalgia a dialectical unity of an "unstable equilibrium of homesickness and wanderlust at once".

== Religiosity ==
For a long time it had been argued that Eichendorff's view of Romanticism had been subordinate to religious beliefs. More recently, however, Christoph Hollender has noted that Eichendorff's late religious and political writings were commissioned works, while his poetry represents a highly personal perspective.

== Eichendorff's own résumé ==
Eichendorff summed up the Romantic epoch stating that it "soared like a magnificent rocket sparkling up into the sky, and after shortly and wonderfully lighting up the night, it exploded overhead into a thousand colorful stars."

== Legacy ==
While other authors (such as Ludwig Tieck, Caroline de la Motte Fouqué, Clemens Brentano and Bettina von Arnim) adapted the themes and styles of their writing to the emerging realism, Eichendorff "stayed true to the emblematic universe of his literary Romanticism right through to the 1850s," Adorno stated: "Unconsciously Eichendorff's unleashed romanticism leads right up to the threshold of modernism".

== Works ==
=== Volumes of poetry ===
- First publication of some Poems in Ast's Zeitschrift für Wissenschaft und Kunst, under the pseudonym «Florens»; Heidelberg, (1808),
- Gedichte von Joseph Freiherrn von Eichendorff, Verlag Duncker & Humblot, Berlin, (1837)
- Julian, story in verses, (1853)
- Robert und Guiscard, epic poem, (1855)
- Lucius, epic poem, (1855)

=== Narrative texts ===
==== Novels ====
- Ahnung und Gegenwart. Mit einem Vorwort von de la Motte Fouqué, novel, Nürnberg, bei Johann Leonhard Schrag (1815)
- Dichter und ihre Gesellen, novel, Verlag Duncker & Humblot, Berlin (1834)

==== Novellas ====
- Die Zauberei im Herbste, (1808/09), published posthumously in 1906,
- Das Marmorbild (The Marble Statue), ed. by De la Motte-Fouqué, published in «Frauentaschenbuch für das Jahr 1819» (1819),
- Aus dem Leben eines Taugenichts (Memoirs of a Good-for-Nothing) together with Das Marmorbild (The Marble Statue), (1826),
- Viel Lärmen um Nichts (1833)
- Eine Meerfahrt, (1836); published posthumously (1864)
- Das Schloß Dürande, (1837)
- Die Entführung, in: Urania. Taschenbuch für das Jahr 1839 (1839)
- Die Glücksritter, in: Rheinisches Jahrbuch (1841)
- Libertas und ihre Freier (1848), published posthumously (1858)

==== Play texts ====
- Krieg den Philistern! Dramatisches Märchen in Fünf Abenteuern, (1823)
- Meierbeth's Glück und Ende, (1827)
- Ezelin von Romano, (1828)
- Der letzte Held von Marienburg, (1830)
- Die Freier, (1833)

=== Translations ===
- Juan Manuel: Der Graf Lucanor, (1840)
- Die geistlichen Schauspiele Calderons (2 vol.), (1846–53)

=== As literary critic ===
- Über die ethische und religiöse Bedeutung der neuen romantischen Poesie in Deutschland (On the ethical and religious significance of the new romantic poetry in Germany), (1847)
- Der deutsche Roman des 18. Jahrhunderts in seinem Verhältniss zum Christenthum (The German novel of the 18th century in its relationship to Christianity), (1851)
- Geschichte der poetischen Literatur Deutschlands, (1857)

=== As anthologist ===
- Oberschlesische Märchen und Sagen (Upper Silesian fairytales and sagas) (1808–1810), including five fairy tales (with their respective classification in the Aarne-Thompson-Uther Index):
  - Die schöne Craßna und das Ungeheuer, variant of Beauty and the Beast (tale type ATU 425C);
  - Die Prinzessin als Küchenmagd, variant of Allerleirauh (mostly tale type ATU 510B);
  - Der Faulpelz und der Fisch, variant of Peruonto and Emelian the Fool (tale type ATU 675);
  - Die schöne Sophie, variant of Snow White (tale type ATU 709);
  - Der Vogel Venus, variant of The Golden Bird (mostly tale type ATU 550, combined with ATU 551 and ATU 506).

=== As editor ===
- Lebrecht Blücher Dreves: Gedichte. Ed. and with a foreword by Joseph v. Eichendorff. Verlag Duncker & Humblot, Berlin 1849.

=== Set to music ===
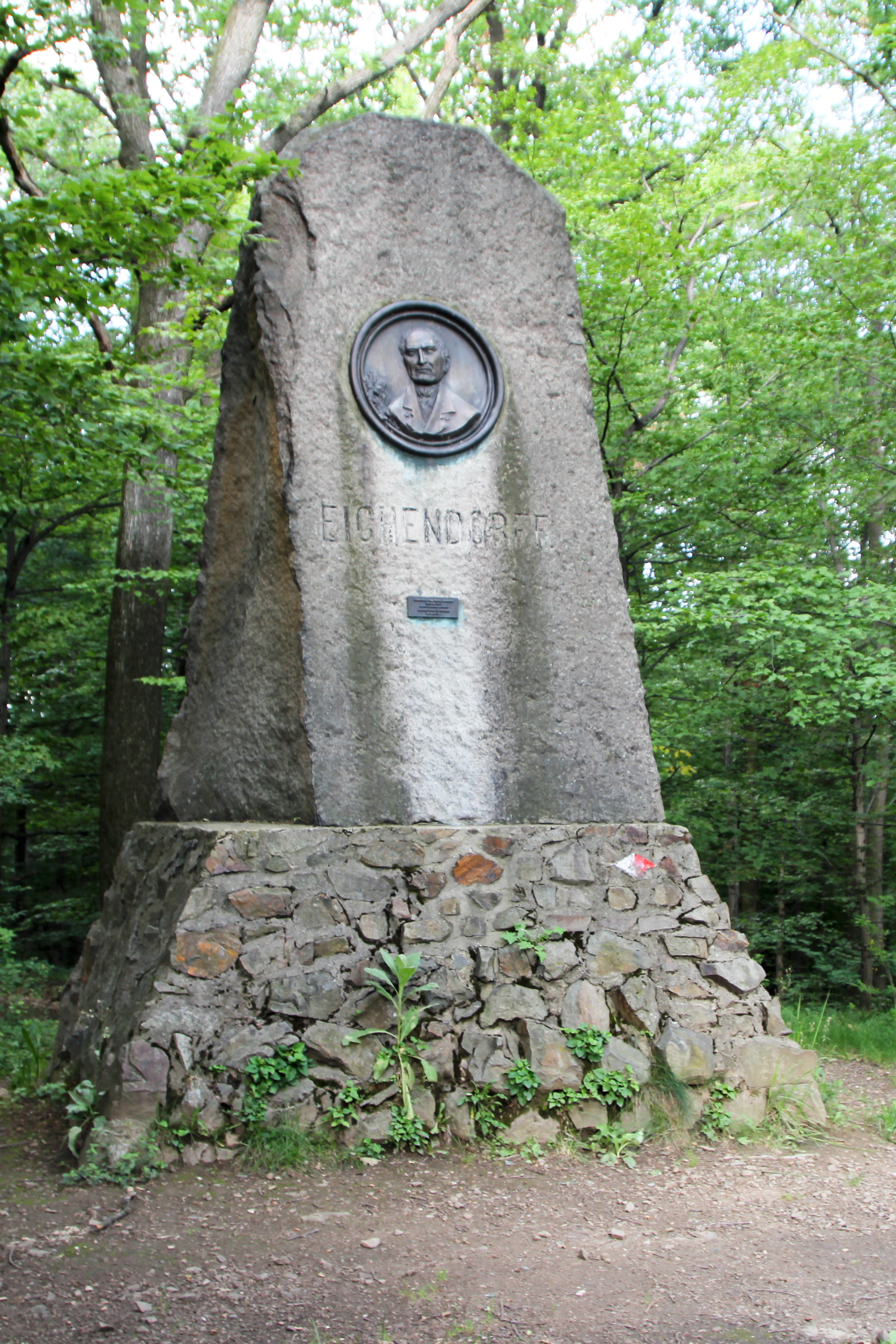
Eichendorff monument in Prudnik, erected in 1911

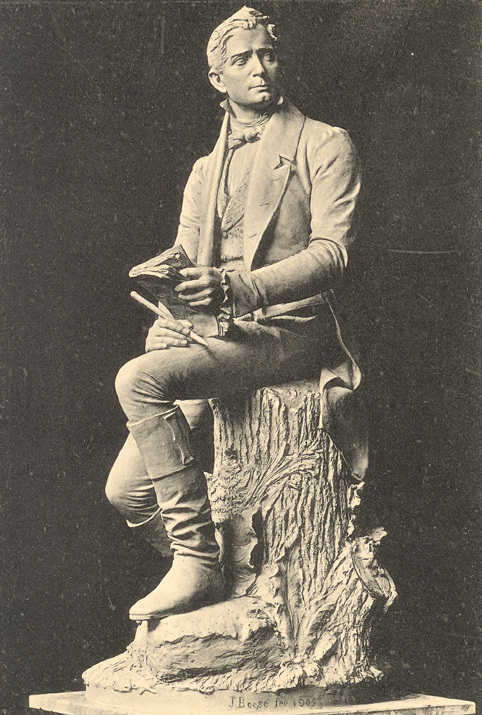
Eichendorff monument in Ratibor by Johannes Boese. Erected in 1909, it was removed in 1945 when the Soviets occupied Silesia and disappeared shortly thereafter. A replacement was put up in 1994.

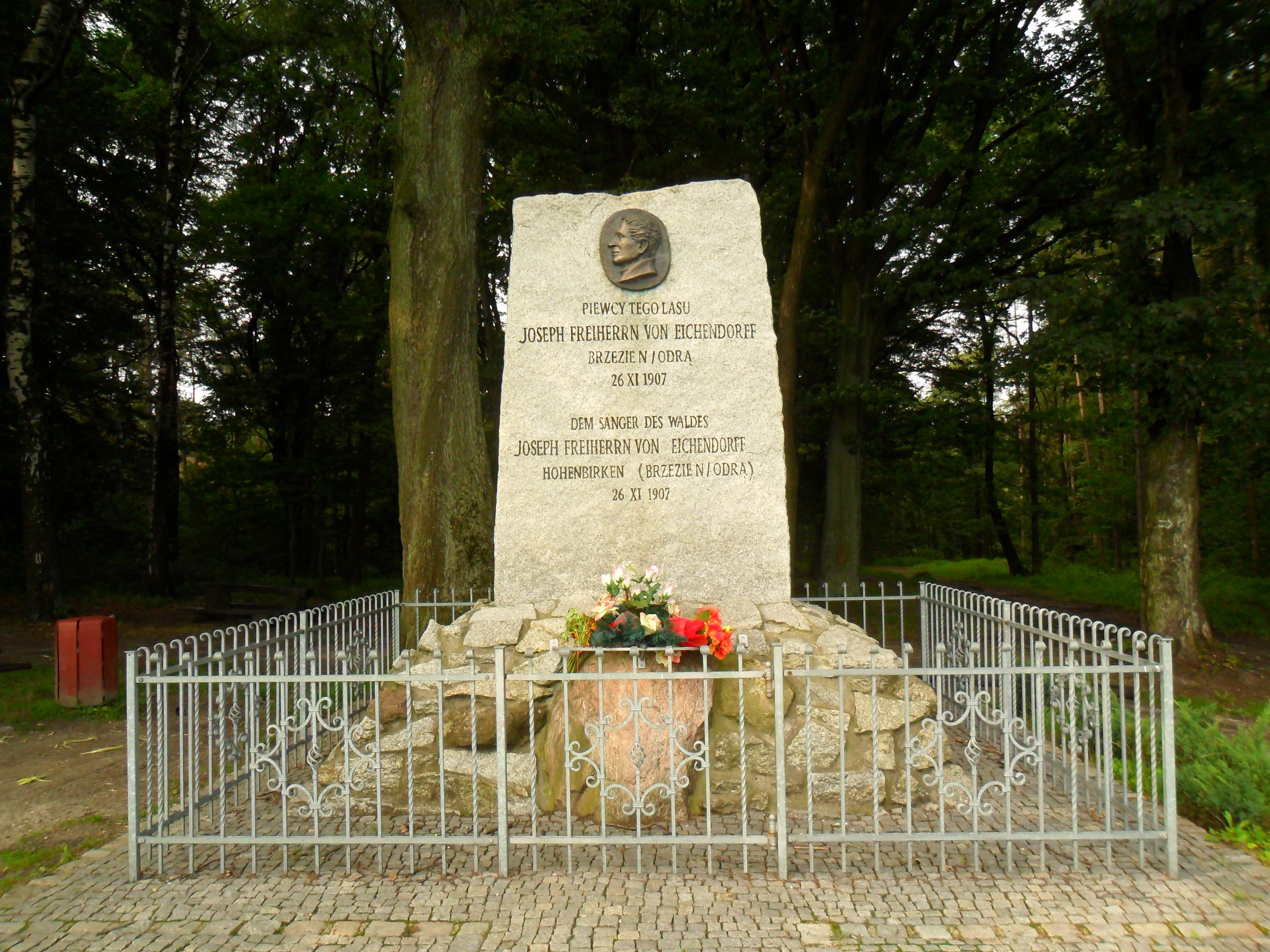
Joseph von Eichendorff memorial monument in Ratibor, Poland, today

With approximately 5000 musical settings, Eichendorff is the most popular German poet set into music. "The magical, enchanting lyricism of his poetry almost seems to be music itself," as it is praised. His poems have been set to music by many composers, including Schumann, Mendelssohn, Max Bruch, Johannes Brahms, Hugo Wolf, Didia Saint Georges, Richard Strauss, Hans Pfitzner, Pauline Volkstein,Hermann Zilcher, Alexander Zemlinsky, Max Reger, and even Friedrich Nietzsche.

His poems also inspired orchestral music, such as Reger's Eine romantische Suite as well as electronic arrangements by Qntal.

=== Collected works ===
Sämtliche Werke des Freiherrn Joseph von Eichendorff. Historisch-kritische Ausgabe (shortened form: HKA). Begründet von Wilhelm Kosch und August Sauer, fortgeführt und herausgegeben von Hermann Kunisch (†) und Helmut Koopmann, Max Niemeyer Verlag, Tübingen.

- HKA I/1: Gedichte. Erster Teil. Text. Ed. by Harry Fröhlich/Ursula Regener (1993).
- HKA I/2: Gedichte. Erster Teil. Kommentar. Aufgrund von Vorarbeiten von Wolfgang Kron. Ed. by Harry Fröhlich (1994).
- HKA I/3: Gedichte. Zweiter Teil. Verstreute und nachgelassene Gedichte. Text. Ed. by Ursula Regener (1997).
- HKA I/4: Gedichte. Zweiter Teil. Verstreute und nachgelassene Gedichte. Kommentar. Ed. by Ursula Regener (1997).
- HKA III: Ahnung und Gegenwart. Ed. by Christiane Briegleb/Clemens Rauschenberg (1984).
- HKA IV: Dichter und ihre Gesellen. Ed. by Volkmar Stein (2001).
- HKA V/1: Erzählungen. Erster Teil. Text. Ed. by Karl Konrad Polheim (1998).
- HKA V/2: Erzählungen. Erster Teil. Kommentar. Ed. by Karl Konrad Polheim (2000).
- HKA V/3: Erzählungen. Zweiter Teil. Fragmente und Nachgelassenes. Ed. by Heinz-Peter Niewerth (2006).
- HKA V/4: Erzählungen. Dritter Teil. Autobiographische Fragmente. Ed. by Dietmar Kunisch (1998).
- HKA VI/1: Historische Dramen und Dramenfragmente. Text und Varianten. Ed. by Harry Fröhlich (1996).
- HKA VI/2: Historische Dramen und Dramenfragmente. Kommentar. Ed. by Klaus Köhnke (1997).
- HKA VIII/1: Literarhistorische Schriften I. Aufsätze zur Literatur. Aufgrund der Vorarbeiten von Franz Ranegger. Ed. by Wolfram Mauser (1962).
- HKA VIII/2: Literarhistorische Schriften II. Abhandlungen zur Literatur. Aufgrund der Vorarbeiten von Franz Ranegger. Ed. by Wolfram Mauser (1965).
- HKA IX: Literarhistorische Schriften III. Geschichte der poetischen Literatur Deutschlands. Ed. by Wolfram Mauser (1970).
- HKA XI: Tagebücher. Ed. by Franz Heiduk/Ursula Regener (2006)
- HKA XII: Briefe 1794–1857. Text. Ed. by Sibylle von Steinsdorff (1993).
- HKA XV/1: Übersetzungen I. Erster Teil. Graf Lucanor von Don Juan Manuel. Geistliche Schauspiele von Don Pedro Calderón la Barca I. Ed. by Harry Fröhlich (2003).
- HKA XV/2: Übersetzungen I. Zweiter Teil. Geistliche Schauspiele von Don Pedro Calderón la Barca II. Ed. by Harry Fröhlich (2002).
- HKA XVI: Übersetzungen II. Unvollendete Übersetzungen aus dem Spanischen. Ed. by Klaus Dahme (1966).
- HKA XVIII/1: Eichendorff im Urteil seiner Zeit I. Dokumente 1788–1843. Günter and Irmgard Niggl (1975).
- HKA XVIII/2: Eichendorff im Urteil seiner Zeit II. Dokumente 1843–1860. Ed. by Günter and Irmgard Niggl (1976).
- HKA XVIII/3: Eichendorff im Urteil seiner Zeit III. Kommentar und Register. Ed. by Günter and Irmgard Niggl (1986).
- HKA II: Epische Gedichte.
- HKA VII: Dramen II. Satirische Dramen und Dramenfragmente. Ed. by Harry Fröhlich.
- HKA X: Historische und politische Schriften. Ed. by Antonie Magen
- HKA XIII: Briefe an Eichendorff. Ed. by Sibylle von Steinsdorff.
- HKA XIV: Kommentar zu den Briefen (Bd. XII und Bd. XIII). Ed. by Sibylle von Steinsdorff.
- HKA XVII: Amtliche Schriften. Ed. by Hans Pörnbacher.
- Joseph von Eichendorff, Werke, 6 Bde. (Bibliothek deutscher Klassiker) Hrsg. von Wolfgang Frühwald. Deutscher Klassiker-Verlag, Frankfurt am Main 1985–93
- Joseph von Eichendorff: Ausgewählte Werke. Ed. by Hans A. Neunzig. Nymphenburger, Berlin 1987. ISBN 3-485-00554-1
- Wolfdietrich Rasch (Ed.): Joseph von Eichendorff. Sämtliche Gedichte. Deutscher Taschenbuch Verlag, Munich, 1975. ISBN 3-446-11427-0

== See also ==
- Eichendorff-Literaturpreis
- 19th_century#Literature
- German Romanticism
