= Denkmäler der Tonkunst in Österreich =

Austrian historical edition of music

Denkmäler der Tonkunst in Österreich (Monuments of Fine Austrian Music; 1894–) is a historical edition of music from Austria covering the Renaissance, Baroque, and Classical periods. The most recent volume in the edition was published in 2017.

Volumes (Bände) 1 to 83 of DTÖ were published in annual issues (Jahrgänge) I to XXXV from 1894 to 1938.

Parallels may be drawn between the historical edition entitled Denkmäler deutscher Tonkunst (DdT) (two series, 1892–1931, and 1900–1931), and DTÖ. The second series of DdT was separately titled Denkmäler der Tonkunst in Bayern (DTB). A new revised edition of DdT was published between 1957 and 1961. Another new, further revised edition of DTB was started in 1962.

== Table of contents ==
The publishers' names are abbreviated for space-saving: AK, Akademische Druck- und Verlagsanstalt; AR, Artaria & Co., Vienna; Ö, Österreichischer Bundesverlag; and, U, Universal-Edition.

Number	Volume, and Year	Annual issue	Composer(s)	Work titles / Translation	Editor(s)	Publisher(s) (First Edition)	Publishers (Second Edition)	Date of composition
1.	Band 1894	I/1	Johann Joseph Fux	Messen / Masses	Habert, J. E., and Glossner, G. A.	AR, 1894		1710-1720
2.	Band 1894	I/2	Georg Muffat (1653-1704)	Florilegium Primum / First Anthology	Rietsch, H.	AR, 1894		1695
3.	Band 1895	II/1	Johann Joseph Fux	Motetten / Motets	Habert, J. E.	AR, 1895		1710-1720
4.	Band 1895	II/2	Georg Muffat (1690-1770)	Florilegium Secundum / Second Anthology	Rietsch, H.	AR, 1895		1698
5.	Band 1896	III/1	Johann Stadlmayr	Hymnen / Hymns	Habert, J. E.	AR, 1896		
6.	Band 1896	III/2	Antonio Cesti (1623-1669)	Il Pomo d'oro (Prolog und 1. Akt) / The golden apple (Prologue, and Act I)	Guido Adler	AR, 1896		1668
7.	Band 1896	III/3	Gottlieb Muffat (1690-1770)	Componimenti Musicali / Musical Compositions	Adler, G.	AR, 1896		1739
8.	Band 1897	IV/1	Johann Jakob Froberger (1616-1667)	Orgel- und Klavierwerke, I / Organ, and keyboard works, I	Adler, G.	AR, 1897		c. 1695
9.	Band 1897	IV/2	Antonio Cesti (1623-1669)	Il Pomo d'oro (2.—5. AKt) / The golden apple (Acts II-V)	Adler, G.	AR, 1897		1668
10.	Band 1898	V/1	Heinrich Isaac (1450-1517)	Choralis Constantinus I / Choral Constance I	Becezny, E., and Rabl, W.	AR, 1898		1512
11.	Band 1898	V/2	Heinrich Ignaz Franz Biber	Violinsonaten / Violin sonatas	Adler, G.	AR, 1898		1681
12.	Band 1899	VI/1	Jacobus Gallus	Opus musicum, I / Musical works, I	Bezecný, E., and Mantuani, J.	AR, 1899		1591
13.	Band 1899	VI/2	Johann Jakob Froberger	Klavierwerke, II / Keyboard works, II	Adler, G.	AR, 1899		1649, and 1656
14. u. 15.	Band 1900	VII		Trienter Codices, I / Trent Codices, I	Adler, G., and Koller, O.	AR, 1900		1400-1500
16.	Band 1901	VIII/1	Andreas Hammerschmidt	Dialoge, I / Dialogues, I	Schmidt, A.W.	AR, 1901		1645
17.	Band 1901	VIII/2	Johann Pachelbel	Kompositionen für Orgel oder Klavier / Compositions for organ or keyboard	Botstiber, H., and Seiffert, M.	AR, 1901		1695
18.	Band 1902	IX/1	Oswald von Wolkenstein	Geistliche und weltliche Lieder / Sacred and secular songs	Schatz, J., and Koller, O.	AR, 1902		1425-1438
19.	Band 1902	IX/2	Johann Joseph Fux	Mehrfach besetzte Instrumentalwerke / Instrumental works in multiple arrangements	Adler, G.	AR, 1902		c. 1700
20.	Band 1903	X/1	Orazio Benevoli	Festmesse und Hymnus / Festal Mass and Hymn	Adler, G.	AR, 1903		
21.	Band 1903	X/2	Johann Jakob Froberger	Orgel- und Klavierwerke, III / Organ, and keyboard works, III	Adler, G.	AR, 1903		
22.	Band 1904	XI/1		Trienter Codices, II / Trent Codices, II	Adler, G., and Koller, O.	AR, 1904		
23.	Band 1904	XI/2	Georg Muffat	Concerti grossi / Concerti grossi	Luntz, E.	AR, 1904		
24.	Band 1905	XII/1	Jacobus Gallus	Opus musicum, II / Musical works, II	Bezecný, E., and Mantuani, J.	AR, 1905		
25.	Band 1905	XII/2	Heinrich Ignaz Franz Biber	Violinsonaten / Violin sonatas	Luntz, E.	AR, 1905		
26.	Band 1906	XIII/1	Antonio Caldara	Kirchenwerke / Church works	Eusebius Mandyczewski	AR, 1906		
27.	Band 1906	XIII/2		Wiener Klavier- und Orgelwerke a. d. zweiten Hälfte d. 17. Jahrh. / Viennese keyboard, and organ works from the second half of the 17th century	Botstiber, H.	AR, 1906		1650-1699
28.	Band 1907	XIV/1	Heinrich Isaac	Weltliche Werke, Instrumentalsätze / Secular works, Instrumental movements	Johannes Wolf	AR, 1907		
29.	Band 1907	XIV/2	Michael Haydn	Instrumentalwerke / Instrumental works	Perger, L. H.	AR, 1907		
30.	Band 1908	XV/1	Jacobus Gallus	Opus musicum, III / Musical works, III	Bezecný, E., and Mantuani, J.	AR, 1908		
31.	Band 1908	XV/2		Wiener Instrumentalmusik vor und um 1750, I / Viennese instrumental music before and circa 1750	Horwitz, K., and Riedel, K.	AR, 1908		
32.	Band 1909	XVI/1	Heinrich Isaac	Choralis Constantinus II, Nachtrag d. weltl. Werken / Choral Constance, and Supplement to the secular works	Anton Webern and Wolf, J.	AR, 1909		
33.	Band 1909	XVI/2	Johann Georg Albrechtsberger	Instrumentalwerke / Instrumental works	Kapp, O.	AR, 1909		
34. u. 35.	Band 1910	XVII	Johann Joseph Fux	Costanza e Fortezza / Constancy and Strength [Festa teatrale in drei Akten / Opera in three acts]	Egon Wellesz	AR, 1910	AK, 1959	1722
36.	Band 1911	XVIII/1	Ignaz Umlauf	Die Bergknappen / The miners [Singspiel in one act]	Robert Haas	AR, 1911		1778
37.	Band 1911	XVIII/2		Österr. Lautenmusik im 16. Jahrh. / Austrian lute-music in the 16th century	Koczirz, A.	AR, 1911		1500-1599
38.	Band 1912	XIX/1		Trienter Codices, III / Trent Codices, III	Adler, G., and Koller, O.	AR, 1912		
39.	Band 1912	XIX/2		Wiener Instrumentalmusik vor und um 1750, II / Viennese instrumental music before and circa 1750	Wilhelm Fischer	AR, 1912		
40.	Band 1913	XX/1	Jacobus Gallus	Opus musicum, IV / Musical works, IV	Bezecný, E., and Mantuani, J.	AR, 1913		
41.	Band 1913	XX/2		Gesänge von Frauenlob, Reinmar von Zweter und Alexander / Songs by Frauenlob, Reinmar von Zweter, and Alexander	Rietsch, H.	AR, 1913		
42.–44.	Band 1914	XXI/1	Florian Leopold Gassmann	La Contessina / The little countess [dramma giocoso]	Haas, R.	AR, 1914		c. 1770
44a	Band 1914	XXI/2	Christoph Willibald Gluck	Orfeo und Euridice / Orpheus and Eurydice	Abert, H.	AR, 1914		
45.	Band 1915	XXII	Michael Haydn	Drei Messen / Three masses	Klafsky, A. M.	AR, 1915		
46.	Band 1916	XXIII/1	Antonio Draghi	Kirchenwerke / Church works	Adler, G.	AR, 1916		
47.	Band 1916	XXIII/2	Johann Joseph Fux	Concentus musico-instrumentalis / A symphony of music and instruments	Rietsch, H.	AR, 1916		
48.	Band 1917	XXIV	Jacobus Gallus	Opus musicum, V / Musical works, V	Bezecný, E., and Mantuani, J.	AR, 1917		
49.	Band 1918	XXV/1		Vier Messen fur Soli, Chor und Orchester a. d. letzten Viertel des 17. Jahrh. / Four masses for soloists, chorus, and orchestra from the last quarter of the 17th century	Adler, G.	AR, 1918		
50.	Band 1918	XXV/2		Österreichische Lautenmusik zwischen 1650 und 1720 / Austrian lute-music between 1650 and 1720	Koczirz, A.	AR, 1918		1650-1720
51. u. 52.	Band 1919	XXV/1	Jacobus Gallus	Opus musicum, VI / Musical works, VI	Bezecný, E., and Mantuani, J.	AR, 1919		
53.	Band 1920	XXVII/1		Trienter Codices, IV / Trent Codices, IV	Ficker, R., and Orel, A.	U, 1920		
54.	Band 1920	XXVII/2		Wiener Lied 1778-91 / Viennese song 1778-1791	Maschek, H., and Kraus, H.	U, 1920		
55.	Band 1921	XXVIII/1	Johann Ernst Eberlin	Der blutschwitzende Jesus / The passion of Jesus	Haas, R.	U, 1921	AK, 1960	
56.	Band 1921	XXVIII/2		Wiener Tanzmusik i. d. 2. Hälfte d. 17. Jahrh. / Viennese dance music in the second half of the 17th century	Nettl, P.	U, 1921		
57.	Band 1922	XXIX/1	Claudio Monteverdi	Il Ritorno d'Ulisse in Patria / The return of Ulysses	Haas, R.	U, 1922		
58.	Band 1922	XXIX/2	Gottlieb Muffat (1690-1770)	12 Toccaten und 72 Versetl / 12 toccatas, and 72 versets	Adler, G.	U, 1922		
59.	Band 1923	XXX/1		Drei Requiem a. d. 17. Jahrh / Three requiems from the 17th century	Adler, G.	U, 1923		
60.	Band 1923	XXX/2	Christoph Willibald Gluck	Don Juan [ballet]	Haas, R.	U, 1923		
61.	Band 1924	XXXI		Trienter Codices, V / Trent Codices, V	Ficker, R.	U, 1924		
62.	Band 1925	XXXII/1	Michael Haydn	Kirchenwerke / Church works	Klafsky, A.M.	U, 1925		
63.	Band 1925	XXXII/2	Johann Strauss II	Walzer / Waltzes	Hans Gál	U, 1925		
64.	Band 1926	XXXIII/1		Deutsche Komödienarien, I / German comedy arias, I	Haas, R.	U, 1926		
65.	Band 1926	XXXIII/2	Joseph Lanner	Ländler und Walzer / Ländler and waltzes	Orel, A.	U, 1926		
66.	Band 1927	XXXIV	Johann Baptist Schenk	Der Dorfbarbier / The village barber [Singspiel in one act]	Haas, R.	U, 1927		
67.	Band 1928	XXXV/1	Emanuel Aloys Förster	Kammermusik / Chamber music	Karl Weigl	U, 1928		
68.	Band 1928	XXXV/2	Johann Strauss I	Walzer / Waltzes	Gál, H.	U, 1928		
69.	Band 1929	XXXVI/1	Stefano Bernardi	Kirchenwerke / Church works	Rosenthal, K. A.	U, 1929		
70.	Band 1929	XXXVI/2	Paul Peuerl and Isaac Posch	Instrumental- u. Vokalwerke / Instrumental and vocal works	Karl Geiringer	U, 1929		
71.	Band 1930	XXXVII/1	Neidhart von Reuental	Lieder / Songs	Wolfgang Schmieder	U, 1930		
72.	Band 1930	XXXVII/2		Das deutsche Gesellschaftslied in Österreich von 1480 bis 1550 / The German bourgeois song in Austria from 1480 to 1550	Koczirz, A.	U, 1930		
73.	Band 1931	XXXVIII/1	Blasius Ammon	Kirchenwerke, I / Church works	Huigens, Pater C.	U, 1931		
74.	Band 1931	XXXVIII/2	Josef Strauss	Walzer / Waltzes	Botstiber, H.	U, 1931		
75.	Band 1932	XXXIX	Antonio Caldara	Kammermusik für Gesang / Chamber music for voice	Mandyczewski, E.	U, 1932		
76.	Band 1933	XL		Trienter Codices, VI / Trent Codices	Ficker, R.	U, 1933		
77.	Band 1934	XLI		Italienische Musiker 1567—1625 / Italian musicians 1567-1625	Alfred Einstein	U, 1934		
78.	Band 1935	XLII/1	Jacobus Gallus	Sechs Messen / Six masses	Pisk, P. A.	U, 1935		
79.	Band 1935	XLII/2		Wiener Lied 1792—1815 / Viennese song 1792-1815	Maschek, H., and Kraus, H.	U, 1935		
80.	Band 1936	XLIII/1		Salzburger Kirchenkomponisten / Church compositions from Salzburg	Rosenthal, K. A., and Schneider, C.	U, 1936		
81.	Band 1936	XLIII/2	Carl Ditters von Dittersdorf	Instrumentalwerke / Instrumental works	Luithlen, V.	U, 1936		
82.	Band 1937	XLIV	Christoph Willibald Gluck	L'innocenza giustificata / Innocence justified [festa teatrale]	Einstein, A.	U, 1937		1755
83.	Band 1938	XLV	Florian Leopold Gassmann	Kirchenwerke / Church works	Kosch, F.	U, 1938		
84.	Band 1942			Wiener Lautenmusik im 18. Jahrh. / Viennese lute-musik in the 18th century	Schnürl, K., with material from Koczirz, A., and Klima, J.	U, 1942		
85.	Band 1947		Johann Joseph Fux	Werke fur Tasteninstrumente / Works for keyboard instruments	Schenk, E.	Ö, 1947		
86.	Band 1949			Tiroler Instrumentalmusik im 18. Jahrh. / Tyrolese instrumental music in the 18th century	Senn, W.	Ö, 1949		
87.	Band 1951		Nicolaus Zangius	Geistliche und weltliche Gesänge / Sacred and secular songs	Sachs, H., and Pfalz, A.	Ö, 1951		
88.	Band 1952		Johann Georg Reutter	Kirchenwerke / Church works	Hofer, N.	Ö, 1952		
89.	Band 1953		Georg Muffat	Armonico tributo 1682. Sechs Concerti grossi 1701 / A tribute to harmony 1682. Six concerti grossi 1701	Schenk, E.	Ö, 1953		
90.	Band 1954			Niederländische und italienische Musiker der Grazer Hofkapelle Karls II. (1564-1590) / Dutch and Italian musicians of the Graz Court Chapel of Karl II (1564-1590)	Hellmut Federhofer and John, R.	Ö, 1954		
91.	Band 1955		Antonio Caldara	Dafne / Daphne [dramma pastorale per musica]	Schneider, C., and John, R.	Ö, 1955		
92.	Band 1956		Heinrich Ignaz Franz Biber	Harmonia artificiosa-ariosa diversimode accordata	Nettl, P., and Reidinger, F.	Ö, 1956		
93.	Band 1958		Johann Heinrich Schmelzer	Sonatae unarum fidium 1664. Violinsonaten handschriftlicher Überlieferung / Sonatas for one player 1664. Violin sonatas in manuscript	Schenk, E.	AK, 1958		
94. u. 95.	Band 1959		Jacobus Gallus	Fünf Messen zu acht und sieben Stimmen quam foro pluribus fidibus concinnatum et concini aptum (1683) / Five masses for eight and seven voices apt and pleasing for the complete congregation in concert	Pisk, P.A.	Ö, 1959		
96.	Band 1960		Heinrich Ignaz Franz Biber	Mensa Sonora seu musica instrumentalis sonatis aliquot liberius sonantibus ad mensam (1680) / [1680 German title: Das klingende Taffel, oder instrumentalische Taffel-Musik mit frisch-lautenden Geigen-Klang]	Schenk, E.	AK, 1960	<No second edition yet.>	
97.	Band 1960		Heinrich Ignaz Franz von Biber	Fidicinium Sacro Profanum tam choro quam foro pluribus fidibus concinnatum et concini aptum (1683)	Schenk, E.	AK, 1960		
98.	Band 1961		Jacobus Vaet	Sämtliche Werke I	Steinhardt, M.	AK, 1961		
99.	Band 1961		Arnold von Bruck	Sämtliche lateinische Motetten und andere unedierte Werke	Wessely, O.	AK, 1961		
100.	Band 1962		Jacobus Vaet	Sämtliche Werke II	Steinhardt, M.	AK, 1962		
101. u. 102.	Band 1962			Geistliche Solomotetten des 18. Jahrhunderts	Schoenbaum, C.	AK, 1962		
103. u. 104.	Band 1963		Jacobus Vaet	Sämtliche Werke III	Steinhardt, M.	AK, 1963		
105.	Band 1963		Johann Heinrich Schmelzer	Duodena selectarum sonatarum (1659). Werke handschriftlicher Überlieferung	Schenk, E.	AK, 1963		
106. u. 107.	Band 1963		Heinrich Ignaz Franz von Biber	Sonatae tam Aris quam Aulis Servientes (1676)	Schenk, E.	AK, 1963		
108. u. 109.	Band 1964		Jacobus Vaet	Sämtliche Werke IV	Steinhardt, M.	AK, 1964		
110.	Band 1964		Tiburtio Massaino	Liber primus cantionum ecclesiasticarum (1592), Drei Instrumentalcanzonen (1608)	Monterosso, R.	AK, 1964		
111. u. 112.	Band 1965		Johann Heinrich Schmelzer	Sacro-profanus Concentus musicus fidium aliorumque instrumentorum (1662)	Schenk, E.	AK, 1965		
113. u. 114.	Band 1966		Jacobus Vaet	Sämtliche Werke V	Steinhardt, M.	AK, 1966		
115.	Band 1966			Suiten für Tasteninstrumente von und um Franz Mathias Techelmann	Knaus, H.	AK, 1966		
116.	Band 1967		Jacobus Vaet	Sämtliche Werke VI	Steinhardt, M.	AK, 1967		
117.	Band 1967		Jacobus Gallus	Drei Messen zu sechs Stimmen	Pisk, P.A.	AK, 1967		
118.	Band 1968		Jacobus Vaet	Sämtliche Werke VII	Steinhardt, M.	AK, 1968		
119.	Band 1969		Jacobus Gallus	Fünf Messen zu vier bis sechs Stimmen	Pisk, P.A.	AK, 1969		
120.	Band 1970			Trienter Codices VII	Rudolf Flotzinger	AK, 1970		
121.	Band 1971			Deutsche Komödienarien 1754-1758 II	Schoenbaum, C., and Zeman, H.	AK, 1971		
122.	Band 1971		Hieronymus Bildstein	Orpheus christianus (1624) I	Pass, W.	AK, 1971		
123.	Band 1971		Alard du Gaucquier	Sämtliche Werke	Steinhardt, M.	AK, 1971		
124.	Band 1972			Komponisten der Fürstlich Esterhazyschen Hofkapelle., Luigi Tomasini. Ausgewählte Instrumentalwerke	Schenk, E.	AK, 1972		
125.	Band 1973			Frühmeister des Stile Nuovo in Österreich., Bartolomeo Mutis conte di Cesena, Francesco degli Atti, Giovanni Valentini	Wessely, O.	AK, 1973		
126.	Band 1976		Hieronymus Bildstein	Orpheus christianus (1624) II	Pass, W.	AK, 1976		
127.	Band 1976		Heinrich Ignaz Franz Biber	Instrumentalwerke handschriftlicher Überlieferung	Sehnal, J.	AK, 1976		
128.	Band 1979		Romanus Weichlein	Encaenia musices (1695) I	Wessely, H., and Wessely, O.	AK, 1979		
129.	Band 1979		Andreas Christophorus Clamer	Mensa harmonica (Rudolf Scholz - Karl Schütz)	Scholz, R., and Schütz, K.	AK, 1979		
130.	Band 1980		Romanus Weichlein	Encaenia musices II	Wessely, H., and Wessely, O.	AK, 1980		
131.	Band 1980		Anton Cajetan Adlgasser	Drei Sinfonien	Rainer, W.	AK, 1980		
132.	Band 1981		Johann Bernhard Staudt	Ferdinandus Quintus Rex Hispaniae Maurorum Domitor	Pass, W., and Plepelits, K.	AK, 1981		
133.	Band 1981			Parodiemagnificat aus dem Umkreis der Grazer Hofkapelle (1564-1619)	Gruber, G.	AK, 1981		
134.	Band 1983		Salomon Sulzer	Schir Zion (1839) I. Sabbathliche Gesänge	Eric Werner	AK, 1983		
135.	Band 1983		William Young	Sonate a 3, 4, e 5	Wessely, H., and Wessely, O.	AK, 1983		
136.	Band 1983		Anton Diabelli	Anton Diabellis Vaterländischer Künstlerverein. Zweite Abteilung (Wien 1824)	Brosche, G.	AK, 1983		
137.	Band 1984		Johann Jakob Stupan von Ehrenstein	Armonia Compendiosa (1703). Rosetum musicum (1702)	Schneider, C., and Winkler, K.	AK, 1984		
138. u. 139.	Band 1985		Alexander Utendal	Bußpsalmen und Orationen (1570)	Schulze, S.	AK, 1985		
140. u. 141.	Band 1986			In questa tomba oscura. Giuseppe Carpanis Dichtung in 68 Vertonungen (1808-1814)	Litschauer, W.	AK, 1986		
142-144.	Band 1987			Huldigung der TonsetzerWiens, an Elisabeth Kaiserin von Österreich (Wien 1854)	Brosche, G., and Brigitte Hamann	AK, 1987		
145.	Band 1988		Jacobus Vaet (1529-1567)	Sämtliche Werke. Supplement	Steinhardt, M.	AK, 1988		
146.	Band 1988		Antonio Salieri (1750-1824)	Messe in B-Dur (1809)	Hettrick, J. S.	AK, 1988		
147. u. 148.	Band 1990		Wolfgang Schmeltzl (1500/05-1564)	Guter seltzamer und kunstreicher teutscher Gesang	Flotzinger, R.	AK, 1990		
149.	Band 1995		Pieter Maessins (1505-1562)	Sämtliche Werke	Wessely, O., and Martin Eybl	AK, 1995		
150.	Band 1997		Joseph Lanner (1801-1843)	Walzer	Angerer, P.	AK, 1997		
151.	Band 1997		Heinrich Ignaz Franz von Biber (1644-1704)	Instrumentalwerke handschriftlicher Überlieferung	Sehnal, J.	AK, 1997		
152.	Band 2000		Johann Bernhard Stuadt (1654-1712)	Mulier Fortis. Drama des Wiener Jesuitenkollegium	Pass, W., and Niiyama-Kalicki, F.	AK, 2000		
153.	Band 2003		Heinrich Ignaz Franz von Biber (1644-1704)	Rosenkranz-Sonaten	Glüxam, D., and Rainer, I.	AK, 2003		
154.	Band 2007		Karlmann Pachschmidt (1700–1734)	Missa Sancti Carolomanni und Sinfonia	Opatrny, A.	AK, 2007		
155.	Band 2010		Franz Xaver Süssmayr (1766-1803)	Missa solemnis in D	Wlcek, W., and Duda, E.	AK, 2010		
156.	Band 2013		Antonio Bertali (1605-1669)	Dramatische Sakralwerke	Erhardt, T.; text revision by Noé, A.	AK, 2013		
157.	Band 2014		Ignaz Holzbauer (1711-1783)	Hypermnestra	Bennett, L.	AK, 2014		
158.	Band 2015		Gottlieb Muffat (1690-1770)	Componimenti Musicali per il Cembalo / Musical compositions for the harpsichord	Opatrny, A.	AK, 2015		
159.	Band 2016			Parnassus musicus ferdinandeus	Antonicek, T.	AK, 2016		c. 1615
160.	Band 2017		Johann Stadlmayr	Missae breves	Drexel, K.	AK, 2017		1641

== Alphabetical list of editors, and volumes ==
- Abert, Hermann, 44a
- Adler, Guido (1855-1941), 6, 7, 8, 9, 11, 13, 14. u. 15, 19, 20, 21, 22, 38, 46, 49, 58, 59
- Angerer, Paul, 150
- Bennett, Lawrence, 157
- Bezecný, Emil, 10, 12, 24, 28, 30, 40, 48, 51. u. 52
- Botstiber, Hugo, 17, 27, 74
- Brosche, Günter, 136, 142-144
- Duda, Erich, 155
- Einstein, Alfred, 77, 82
- Erhardt, Tassilo, 156
- Eybl, Martin, 149
- Federhofer, Hellmut, 90
- Ficker, Rudolf, 53, 61, 76
- Fischer, Wilhelm, 39
- Flotzinger, Rudolf, 120, 147. u. 148
- Gál, Hans, 63, 68
- Geiringer, Karl, 70
- Glossner, Gustav Adolf, 1
- Glüxam, DagmAr, 153
- Gruber, Gernot, 133
- Haas, Robert, 36, 42-44, 55, 57, 60, 64, 66
- Habert, Johann Evangelist, 1, 3, 5
- Hamann, Brigitte (1940-2016), 142-144.
- Hettrick, Jane Schatkin, 146
- Hofer, Norbert, 88
- Horwitz, Karl, 31
- Huigens, Pater Caecilianus (1878-1966), 73
- John, Rudolf, 90, 91
- Kapp, OskAr, 33
- Klafsky, Anton Maria, 45, 62
- Klima, Josef, 84
- Knaus, Herwig, 115
- Koczirz, Adolf, 37, 50, 72, 84
- Koller, Oswald, 14. u. 15, 18, 22, 38
- Kosch, Franz, 83
- Kraus, Hedwig, 54, 79
- Litschauer, Walburga, 140. u. 141.
- Luithlen, Victor, 81
- Luntz, Erwin, 23, 25
- Mandyczewski, Eusebius (1857-1929), 26, 75
- Mantuani, Joseph, 12, 24, 30, 40, 48, 51. u. 52
- Maschek, Hermann, 54, 79
- Monterosso, Raffaello, 110
- Nettl, Paul, 56, 92
- Niiyama-Kalicki, Fumiko, 152
- Noé, Alfred, 156
- Opatrny, Alexander, 154
- Orel, Alfred, 53, 65
- Pass, Walter, 122, 126, 132, 152
- Perger, Lothar Herbert, 29
- Pfalz, Anton (1885-1958), 87
- Pisk, Paul Amadeus, 78, 94. u. 95, 117, 119
- Plepelits, Karl, 132
- Rabl, Walter, 10, 28
- Rainer, IngomAr, 153
- Rainer, Werner, 131
- Reidinger, Friedrich, 92
- Riedel, Karl, 31
- Rietsch, Heinrich (1860-1927), 2, 4, 41, 47
- Rosenthal, Karl August, 69, 80
- Sachs, Hans, 87
- Schatz, Joseph, 18
- Schenk, Erich, 85, 89, 93, 96, 97, 105, 106. u. 107, 111. u. 112, 124
- Schmidt, Anton W., 16
- Schmieder, Wolfgang (1901-1990), 71
- Schneider, Constantin, 80, 91, 137
- Schnürl, Karl, 84
- Schoenbaum, Camillo, 101. u. 102, 121
- Scholz, Rudolf, 129
- Schulze, Stefan, 138. u. 139.
- Schütz, Karl, 129
- Sehnal, Jiří (b. 1931), 127, 151
- Seiffert, Max, 17
- Senn, Walter, 86
- Steinhardt, Milton, 98, 100, 103. u. 104, 108. u. 109, 113. u. 114, 116, 118, 123
- Webern, Anton von (1883-1945), 32
- Weigl, Karl (1881-1949), 67
- Wellesz, Egon (1885-1974), 34. u. 35.
- Werner, Eric (1901-1988), 134
- Wessely, Helen, 128, 130, 135
- Wessely, OthmAr, 99, 125, 128, 130, 135, 149
- Winkler, Klaus, 137
- Wlcek, Walter, 155
- Wolf, Johannes (1869-1947), 28, 32
- Zeman, Herbert, 121
