= Martin Eybl =

Austrian musicologist

Martin Eybl is an Austrian musicologist.

== Early life and education ==
Martin Eybl was born on December 7, 1960, in Neumarkt im Hausruckkreis, a town in the province of Upper Austria, and was educated at the Gymnasium in Kremsmünster where he graduated in 1979. Thereafter, he studied at the Anton Bruckner Conservatory in Linz and, in 1984, majored there in Piano Performance (class of Horst Matthaeus). At the same time, he studied composition (German: Tonsatz) at the University of Music and Performing Arts Vienna, as well as musicology at the University of Vienna, from where he graduated in 1988 (Master of Philosophy) and 1995 (Doctor of Philosophy).

== Professional activities and career ==
Martin Eybl has taught lectures and courses at the University of Vienna from 1991 until 2004, and has been teaching at the University of Music and Performing Arts Vienna since 1994 (until 2004 in the fields of Schenkerian analysis and history of music theory).

From 1994 until 2006, he held a course about Schenkerian analysis (German: Lehrgang für Tonsatz nach Heinrich Schenker). In 1996, he was a visiting scholar at Harvard University. Since 2000, he is on the editorial board of Denkmäler der Tonkunst in Österreich (DTÖ – German for Monuments of Musical Art in Austria), becoming editor-in-chief in 2007 (together with Theophil Antonicek).

Martin Eybl obtained his habilitation in music theory in 2004, and since that time holds an academic chair for music history at the University of Music and Performing Arts Vienna. From 2007 to 2009, he served as a member of the university's academic senate.

== Research interests and activities ==
Martin Eybl's main research focus lies on the aesthetics and theory of early 20th century music, as well as on music in Austria during the 18th century and on the edition of pre-classical music. He was involved in several peer-reviewed research projects, among which

- Instrumental ensemble music in the wake of Vienna 1730-1760, 1993-1995;
- Modernity in Vienna and Central Europe around 1900, 1994–2002;
- Changes in musical taste around 1760. The solo concerto in Maria Theresia's Vienna, 2002–2003.

From 2007 until 2010, he acted as the principal investigator of a project called

- The diaries of Heinrich Schenker 1918–1925: commented edition.

== Major publications 1992-2010 ==
=== Books ===
- Ideology and method. Schenker's theory of music in the context of the history of ideas. (German: Ideologie und Methode. Zum ideengeschichtlichen Kontext von Schenkers Musiktheorie). Wiener Veröffentlichungen zur Musikwissenschaft 32. Tutzing 1995 (Ph.D. thesis, Vienna).
- The emancipation of the instant. Schoenberg's scandalizing concerts 1907 and 1908. A documentation (German: Die Befreiung des Augenblicks: Schönbergs Skandalkonzerte von 1907 und 1908. Eine Dokumentation). Wiener Veröffentlichungen zur Musikgeschichte 4. Wien 2004.
- Schenkerian traditions. A Viennese school of music theory and its international dissemination (English/German: Schenker-Traditionen. Eine Wiener Schule der Musiktheorie und ihre internationale Verbreitung), Martin Eybl and Evelyn Fink-Mennel (eds.). Wiener Veröffentlichungen zur Musikgeschichte 6. Wien 2006.
- Celebrations: On occasion of the 70th birthday of Theophil Antonicek (German: Feste. Theophil Antonicek zum 70. Geburtstag), Martin Eybl, Stefan Jena, Andreas Vejvar (eds.), Studien zur Musikwissenschaft 56. Tutzing 2010.

=== Musical Editions ===
- Pieter Maessins, Complete Works (German: Sämtliche Werke). Published by Othmar Wessely und Martin Eybl (DTÖ 149). Graz 1995.
- Johann Joseph Fux, Trio sonatas. Complete Works (German: Sämtliche Werke), Ser. VI, Vol.. 4. Graz 2000.
- Johann Joseph Fux, Trio sonatas. Complete Works (German: Sämtliche Werke), Ser. VI, Vol. 5. Graz 2009.

=== Scholarly Articles ===
==== Music in 18th-century Austria ====
- Nightingale, quail, cuckoo, Adler and Fux. Remarks on the stylistic change in the 18th century on the basis of the recovered Leipzig overture (German: Nachtigall, Wachtel, Kuckuck, Adler und Fux. Bemerkungen zum Stilwandel im 18. Jahrhundert anhand der wiederaufgefundenen Leipziger Ouverture). In Rudolf Flotzinger (ed.), J. J. Fux-Symposium Graz ’91. Proceedings (Grazer musikwissenschaftliche Arbeiten 9), pp. 63–83. Graz 1992.
- Two weddings at the Vienna court 1744 and 1760. Self-conception, representation, and audience of the courtiers during the enlightenment process (German: Zwei Hochzeiten am Wiener Hof 1744 und 1760. Höfisches Selbstverständnis, Repräsentation und Publikum im Prozess der Aufklärung). In: Martin Eybl, Stefan Jena, Andreas Vejvar (eds.), Feste. Theophil Antonicek zum 70. Geburtstag (Studien zur Musikwissenschaft 56), pp. 153–170. Tutzing 2010.
- The secularization of devotion. Perception of music between emancipation and disciplining (German: Die Säkularisierung der Andacht. Musikrezeption im Spannungsfeld zwischen Emanzipation und Disziplinierung). In: Franz M. Eybl (ed.), Strukturwandel kultureller Praxis. Beiträge zu einer kulturwissenschaftlichen Sicht des theresianischen Zeitalters (Jahrbuch der Österreichischen Gesellschaft zur Erforschung des achtzehnten Jahrhunderts 17), pp. 71–93. Wien 2002.
- Early sources of concert symphonies in Kremsmünster 1762–1769. Music in the evolution of public sphere in the wake of Vienna (German: Frühe Quellen von Konzertsinfonien in Kremsmünster 1762–1769. Zur Entwicklung musikalischer Öffentlichkeit im Einflußbereich Wiens) In: Miscellanea Musicae. (Musicologica Austriaca 18), pp. 93–113. Wien 1999.
- Franz Bernhard Ritter von Keeß – Collector, patron and promoter. Vienna's musical life in the spirit of enlightenment (German: Franz Bernhard Ritter von Keeß – Sammler, Mäzen und Organisator. Materialien zu Wiens Musikleben im Geist der Aufklärung) In: Elisabeth Theresia Hilscher (ed.), Österreichische Musik – Musik in Österreich. Beiträge zur Musikgeschichte Mitteleuropas. (Wiener Veröffentlichungen zur Musikwissenschaft 34), pp. 239–250. Tutzing 1998.
- Mozart's earliest concerto movement. The Pasticcio concertos K. 37, 39, 40 and 41 in context of contemporary Vienna (German: Mozarts erster Konzertsatz. Die Pasticcio-Konzerte KV 37, 39, 40 und 41 im zeitgenössischen Wiener Kontext). In: Joachim Brügge et al. (eds.), Musikgeschichte als Verstehensgeschichte, pp. 199–214. Tutzing 2004.
- The Kremsier copies of W.A.Mozart's piano concertos (German: Die Kremsierer Abschriften von Klavierkonzerten W.A. Mozarts). In: Manfred Hermann Schmid (ed.), Mozart-Studien 17, pp. 215–238. Tutzing 2008.

==== From Richard Wagner to modern music ====
- Menacing innovation. Conservative views of music history in Vienna around 1900 (German: Das bedrohliche Neue. Konservative Konzepte von Musikgeschichte in Wien um 1900). In: Gerhard Anselm (ed.), Musikwissenschaft – eine verspätete Disziplin? Die akademische Musikforschung in der ersten Hälfte des 20. Jahrhunderts zwischen Fortschrittsglauben und Modernitätsverweigerung, pp. 119–127. Stuttgart 2000.
- Schoenberg's frightening innovations. Assumptions on a paradigm shift in aesthetics (German: Schönbergs schreckliche Neuerungen. Thesen zu einem ästhetischen Paradigmenwechsel). In: Petr Macek, Mikuláš Bek (eds..), Horror novitatis (Colloquium Musicologicum Brunense 37, 2002), pp. 111–116. Praha 2004.
- Schopenhauer, Freud, and the concept of deep structure in music. In: Martin Eybl, Evelyn Fink-Mennel (eds.), Schenker-Traditionen. Eine Wiener Schule der Musiktheorie und ihre internationale Verbreitung/A Viennese school of music theory and its international dissemination (Wiener Veröffentlichungen zur Musikgeschichte 6), pp. 51–58. Vienna 2006.
- Expressivity versus adherence to the text. Seven observations on Heinrich Schenker's performance indications (German: Texttreue und Expressivität. Sieben Beobachtungen zu Heinrich Schenkers Vortragshinweisen). In: Markus Grassl, Reinhard Kapp (eds.), Die Lehre von der musikalischen Aufführung in der Wiener Schule. Verhandlungen des Internationalen Colloquiums Wien 1995 (Wiener Veröffentlichungen zur Musikgeschichte 3), pp. 411–427. Vienna 2002.

==== Analysis and theory of music ====
- "Tota pulchra es" by Pieter Maessins. Purpose and notion of canon around 1550 (German: "Tota pulchra es" von Pieter Maessins. Zu Begriff und Funktion des Canons um 1550) In: Studien zur Musikwissenschaft 42, S. 34–52 (1993).
- Tonal music as a cross-linked patchwork. A catalog of attributes of harmonic tonality (German: Tonale Musik als vernetztes Stückwerk. Ein Merkmalkatalog der harmonischen Tonalität). In: Ariane Jeßulat, Andreas Ickstadt, Martin Ullrich (eds.), Zwischen Komposition und Hermeneutik, pp. 54–66.Würzburg 2005.
- Purpose and historical preconditions of Heinrich Schenker's analytics (German: Zweckbestimmung und historische Voraussetzungen der Analytik Heinrich Schenkers). In: Gernot Gruber (ed.), Zur Geschichte der musikalischen Analyse (Schriften zur musikalischen Hermeneutik 5), pp. 145–156. Laaber 1996.
- Archaeology of musical art: Heinrich Schenker's analyses of works by Mozart (German: Archäologie der Tonkunst. Mozart-Analysen Heinrich Schenkers). In: Gernot Gruber, Siegfried Mauser (eds.), Mozartanalyse im 19. und frühen 20. Jahrhundert (Schriften zur musikalischen Hermeneutik 6), pp. 133–145. Laaber 1999.
- Grandiose cells of isolation and rattling fugue mechanism – Schenker's critique of his teacher Bruckner (German: Grandiose Isolierzellen und rasselnde Fugenmechanik – Zu Schenkers Kritik an seinem Lehrer Bruckner). In: Othmar Wessely (ed.), Bruckner-Symposion Linz 1988, Proceedings, pp. 137–145. Linz 1992.
- Exploring the perception of Magnus Lindberg's kinetics. An analytical dialogue (jointly with Tomi Mäkelä). In: Tomi Mäkelä (ed.), Topics. Texts. Tensions. Essays in Music Theory on Paavo Heininen, Joonas Kokkonen, Magnus Lindberg, Usko Meriläinen, Einojuhani Rautavaara, Kaija Saariaho & Aulis Sallinen, pp. 64–84. Magdeburg 1999.
