= Franz Födermayr =

Austrian musicologist (1933–2020)

Franz Födermayr (13 September 1933 – 4 April 2020) was an Austrian musicologist.

== Life ==
Born in Grieskirchen, Upper Austria, Födermayr studied musicology from 1954 at the University of Vienna with Erich Schenk (doctorate 1964). From 1964 to 1974 he worked as a university assistant at the musicological institute of the university, and in 1972 he received his habilitation.

From 1973 he held the professorship for comparative musicology at the University of Vienna, where he became emeritus in 1999. From 1986 he served as president of the Österreichische Gesellschaft für Musikwissenschaft for four years. From 1987 to 1997 he was a member of the board of directors of the International Musicological Society.

== Publications ==
- Die musikwissenschaftlichen Phonogramme Ludwig Zöhrers von den Tuareg der Sahara, Dissertation, Vienna 1964
- Zur gesanglichen Stimmgebung in der außereuropäischen Musik, 1971
- with Rudolf Flotzinger and Josef-Horst Lederer edition of the MusAu 6 (1986)
