= Heinrich Besseler =

German musicologist (1900–1969)

- Born: April 2, 1900; Dortmund, Germany
- Died: July 25, 1969 (aged 69); Leipzig, Germany
- Occupation: Musicologist

Heinrich Besseler (April 2, 1900 – July 25, 1969) was a German musicologist born in Hörde. He is particularly known for his colossal work, Die Musik des Mittelalters und der Renaissance (1931), which provided a new perspective on historical musicology by taking a history-of-ideas approach to music history.

== Life ==
Besseler studied philosophy (under Martin Heidegger), German language, mathematics and natural science in Freiburg im Breisgau. Subsequently, he studied music (under Hans Gál) and musicology (under Wilibald Gurlitt, Guido Adler and Wilhelm Fischer) in Vienna and Freiburg. In 1923 he obtained a doctoral degree in musicology from the University of Freiburg. The subject of his thesis was the history and stylistic development of dance suites in seventeenth-century Germany. After further studies at the University of Göttingen, he wrote a professorial thesis on medieval music, spanning the years between 1250 and 1350. From 1928 he taught at the University of Heidelberg.

In 1934, Besseler became a member of the Sturmabteilung. While admittedly failing to distance himself from National Socialism, he did come into some conflicts with Herbert Gerigk, the most notorious antisemitic musicologist in Germany. From 1949 to 1956 he taught at the University of Jena, and from 1957 to 1965 at the University of Leipzig. He was awarded an honorary doctorate at the University of Chicago in 1967, and died in Leipzig two years later.

== Books ==
- Beiträge zur Stilgeschichte der deutschen Suite im 17. Jahrhundert (doctoral thesis, 1923)
- Die Die Motettenkomposition von Petrus de Cruce bis Philipp von Vitry (professorial thesis, 1925)
- Die Musik des Mittelalters und der Renaissance (Potsdam: Akademische Verlagsgesellschaft Athenaion, 1931)
- Guillaume Dufay: zwölf geistliche und weltliche Lieder [Guillaume Dufay: Twelve Sacred and Secular Songs]. Das Chorwerk. Vol. 19. Wolfenbüttel: G. Kallmeyer Verlag. 1932. OCLC 1240177.
- Zum Problem der Tenorgeige, Musikalische Gegenwartsfragen I, 1949
- Bourdon und Fauxbourdon – Studien zum Ursprung der niederländischen Musik, 1950
- Fünf echte Bildnisse Johann Sebastian Bachs, 1956
- Das musikalische Hören der Neuzeit, 1959
- Das Schriftbild der mehrstimmigen Musik, 1973 (co-authored with Peter Gülke).
