= Theophil Antonicek =

Austrian musicologist

Theophil Antonicek (22 November 1937 – 19 April 2014) was an Austrian musicologist.

== Career ==
Born in Vienna, Antonicek studied musicology at the University of Vienna with Erich Schenk. He received his doctorate in 1962 and his habilitation in 1978. Until his retirement he was a lecturer at the University of Vienna.

Antonicek was a corresponding member of the philosophical-historical class of the Austrian Academy of Sciences since 1984 and a full member since 1995, as well as editor of the Denkmäler der Tonkunst in Österreich since 1998. From 1998 to 2010 he also supervised the publication series "Studien zur Musikwissenschaft". As co-founder of the Austrian Society for Musicology, he directed it from 1973 to 1983.

On the occasion of his 70th birthday he was honoured by a symposium.

Antonicek died in Vienna at the age of 76 and was buried at the Romantic Cemetery in Maria Enzersdorf.

== Publications ==
- Ignaz von Mosel (1772–1844). Biographie und Beziehungen zu den Zeitgenossen, Maschinenschriftl. Dissertation, Universität Wien 1962.
- Das Musikarchiv der Pfarrkirche St. Karl Borromäus in Wien. Vienna 1968 and 1973.
- Musik im Festsaal der Österreichischen Akademie der Wissenschaften. Vienna, Cologne, Graz 1972.
- Studien zum Wiener Musikleben in der Zeit der Klassik und des Biedermeier. Vienna 1978.
- Anton Bruckner und die Wiener Hofmusikkapelle. [with Tab.] Graz: Akadem. Druck- u. Verlagsanst. 1979.
- Theophil Antonicek and Elisabeth Hilscher: Vivaldi. Akademische Druck- und Verlagsanstalt, Graz 1997. ISBN 3-201-01677-2.
- Theophil Antonicek (edit.): Musikwissenschaft als Kulturwissenschaft: damals und heute; internationales Symposion (1998) zum Jubiläum der Institutsgründung an der Universität Wien vor 100 Jahren. (Wiener Veröffentlichungen zur Musikwissenschaft; vol. 40) Tutzing 2005.

== Honours ==
- Presentation of the professional title Extraordinary University Professor by the Federal President (based on the resolution of the Federal President, Federal Law Gazette II No. 2008/49, the professional title University Professor may be used since 2008)
- Awarded an honorary doctorate from Masaryk University in Brno 2000.
- Elisabeth Theresia Hilscher (edit.): Austrian music - music in Austria. Contributions to the music history of Central Europe. Theophil Antonicek on his 60th birthday. Hans Schneider, Tutzing 1998
