= List of compositions by Johann Jakob Froberger =

This is a list of compositions by Johann Jakob Froberger, taken from the Froberger Neue Ausgabe sämtlicher Werke (Froberger New Edition of the Complete Works, or NFA), edited by Siegbert Rampe. The list is organized by genres, in a way that makes adding newly found pieces easier than in most other work-lists: numbers 1xx are reserved for toccatas, numbers 2xx for fantasias, etc.

Within each section, Rampe has retained the order of the DTÖ numbers, which were assigned by Guido Adler in the early 20th century Denkmäler der Tonkunst in Österreich series. For example, DTÖ Canzona No. 4 is FbWV 304, DTÖ Suite No. 7 is FbWV 607, etc. Adler, in turn, had followed the ordering in the composer's autograph manuscripts known at the time.

Many works listed here are of uncertain attribution (not all such cases are specially noted). New manuscripts containing Froberger's music are found occasionally (as of 2015, the latest important one being an autograph manuscript from the 1660s that contains 6 fantasies and 6 capriccios (all previously unknown), 5 suites (one of which is new) and three "laments" (two of which are unknown). The authorship of these most recent discoveries is not disputed, but they are currently unavailable); this list lacks some recently identified pieces as well as others that have been attributed to Froberger.

== Toccatas (101–130) ==
FbWV	Composition	Notes
101	Toccata in A minor (DTÖ Toccata No. 1)	Libro Secondo, 1649.
102	Toccata in D minor (DTÖ Toccata No. 2)	Libro Secondo, 1649.
103	Toccata in G major (DTÖ Toccata No. 3)	Libro Secondo, 1649.
104	Toccata in C major (DTÖ Toccata No. 4)	Libro Secondo, 1649.
105	Toccata da sonarsi alla Leuatione in D minor (elevation toccata) (DTÖ Toccata No. 5)	Libro Secondo, 1649.
106	Toccata da sonarsi alla Leuatione in G minor (elevation toccata) (DTÖ Toccata No. 6)	Libro Secondo, 1649.
107	Toccata in G major (DTÖ Toccata No. 7)	Libro Quarto, 1656.
108	Toccata in E major (DTÖ Toccata No. 8)	Libro Quarto, 1656.
109	Toccata in C major (DTÖ Toccata No. 9)	Libro Quarto, 1656.
110	Toccata in F major (DTÖ Toccata No. 10)	Libro Quarto, 1656.
111	Toccata in E minor (elevation toccata, although not labelled as such) (DTÖ Toccata No. 11)	Libro Quarto, 1656.
112	Toccata in A minor (DTÖ Toccata No. 12)	Libro Quarto, 1656.
113	Toccata in E minor (DTÖ Toccata No. 13)	
– 113a	[Fugue, fourth tone] in E minor	
114	Toccata in G major (DTÖ Toccata No. 14)	
115	Toccata in G minor (DTÖ Toccata No. 15)	
– 115a	Fugue (second tone) in G minor	
116	Toccata in C major (DTÖ Toccata No. 16)	
– 116a	Toccata Quinti toni in C major	
117	[Unassigned]	DTÖ Toccata No. 17 is by J. C. Kerll.
118	Toccata in F major (DTÖ Toccata No. 18)	
– 118a	Fugue (sixth tone) in F major	
119	Toccata in D minor (DTÖ Toccata No. 19)	
– 119a	Toccata in D minor	
120	Toccata in A minor (DTÖ Toccata No. 20)	
121	Toccata in D major (DTÖ Toccata No. 21)	
122	[Unassigned]	DTÖ Toccata No. 22 is a variant of No. 16.
123	Toccata in A minor (DTÖ Toccata No. 23)	Authorship questionable (Pachelbel?).
124	Toccata in D minor (DTÖ Toccata No. 24)	Authorship questionable (Pachelbel?).
125	Toccata in F major (DTÖ Toccata No. 25)	Authorship questionable (Pachelbel?).
126	Praeludium in G major	
127	Toccata P[rima]. in C major	Chigi manuscript. Authorship questionable.
128	Toccata 2.a in F major	Chigi manuscript. Authorship questionable.
129	Toccata 3.a in C minor	Chigi manuscript. Authorship questionable.
130	Toccata, tone 2, in G minor	

== Fantasias (201–214) ==
FbWV	Composition	Notes
201	Fantasia Sopra Ut, Re, Mi, Fa, Sol, La in C major (DTÖ Fantasia No. 1)	Libro Secondo, 1649.
202	Fantasia in E minor (DTÖ Fantasia No. 2)	Libro Secondo, 1649.
203	Fantasia in F major (DTÖ Fantasia No. 3)	Libro Secondo, 1649.
204	Fantasia Sopra Sol, La, Re in G major (DTÖ Fantasia No. 4)	Libro Secondo, 1649.
205	Fantasia in A minor (DTÖ Fantasia No. 5)	Libro Secondo, 1649.
206	Fantasia in A minor (DTÖ Fantasia No. 6)	Libro Secondo, 1649.
207	Fantasia in G major (DTÖ Fantasia No. 7)	
208	Fantasia in G major (DTÖ Fantasia No. 8)	Authorship questionable on stylistic grounds.
209	Fantasia in A minor	Sotheby's manuscript, unpublished.
210	Fantasia in E minor	Sotheby's manuscript, unpublished.
211	Fantasia in F major	Sotheby's manuscript, unpublished.
212	Fantasia in G minor	Sotheby's manuscript, unpublished.
213	Fantasia in B♭ major	Sotheby's manuscript, unpublished.
214	Fantasia in F major	Sotheby's manuscript, unpublished.

== Canzonas (301–308) ==
FbWV	Composition	Notes
301	Canzona in D minor (DTÖ Canzona No. 1)	Libro Secondo, 1649.
302	Canzona in G minor (DTÖ Canzona No. 2)	Libro Secondo, 1649.
303	Canzona in F major (DTÖ Canzona No. 3)	Libro Secondo, 1649.
304	Canzona in G major (DTÖ Canzona No. 4)	Libro Secondo, 1649.
305	Canzona in C major (DTÖ Canzona No. 5)	Libro Secondo, 1649.
306	Canzona in A minor (DTÖ Canzona No. 6)	Libro Secondo, 1649.
307	Fugue in D minor	Authorship not certain.
308	Canzona	Unpublished.

== Ricercars (401–416) ==
FbWV	Composition	Notes
401	Ricercar in C major (DTÖ Ricercar No. 1)	Libro di capricci e ricercate, c. 1658.
402	Ricercar in G major (DTÖ Ricercar No. 2)	Libro di capricci e ricercate, c. 1658.
403	Ricercar in F major (DTÖ Ricercar No. 3)	Libro di capricci e ricercate, c. 1658.
404	Ricercar in C major (DTÖ Ricercar No. 4)	Libro di capricci e ricercate, c. 1658.
405	Ricercar in G minor (DTÖ Ricercar No. 5)	Libro di capricci e ricercate, c. 1658.
406	Ricercar in C♯ minor (DTÖ Ricercar No. 6)	Libro di capricci e ricercate, c. 1658.
407	Ricercar in D minor (DTÖ Ricercar No. 7)	Libro Quarto, 1656.
– 407a	Ricercar in D minor	Later version of 407.
408	Ricercar in G minor (DTÖ Ricercar No. 8)	Libro Quarto, 1656.
409	Ricercar in E minor (DTÖ Ricercar No. 9)	Libro Quarto, 1656.
410	Ricercar in G major (DTÖ Ricercar No. 10)	Libro Quarto, 1656.
411	Ricercar in D minor (DTÖ Ricercar No. 11)	Libro Quarto, 1656.
412	Ricercar in F♯ minor (DTÖ Ricercar No. 12)	Libro Quarto, 1656.
413	Fugue in C major	
– 413a	Ricercar in C major	Authenticity doubtful.
414	Fugue in D minor	
415	Fugue in F major	
416	Fugue in D minor	

== Capriccios (501–525) ==
FbWV	Composition	Notes
501	Capriccio in G major (DTÖ Capriccio No. 1)	Libro di capricci e ricercate, c. 1658.
502	Capriccio in A minor (DTÖ Capriccio No. 2)	Libro di capricci e ricercate, c. 1658.
– 502a	Capriccio (fourth tone) in E minor	Short version, possibly by Wolfgang Ebner.
503	Capriccio in D minor (DTÖ Capriccio No. 3)	Libro di capricci e ricercate, c. 1658.
504	Capriccio in F major (DTÖ Capriccio No. 4)	Libro di capricci e ricercate, c. 1658.
– 504a	Capriccio in G major	Short version, possibly by Wolfgang Ebner.
505	Capriccio in G minor (DTÖ Capriccio No. 5)	Libro di capricci e ricercate, c. 1658.
– 505a	Fugue in G minor	Authorship doubtful.
506	Capriccio in C major (DTÖ Capriccio No. 6)	Libro di capricci e ricercate, c. 1658.
507	Capriccio in G major (DTÖ Capriccio No. 7)	Libro Quarto, 1656.
508	Capriccio in G minor (DTÖ Capriccio No. 8)	Libro Quarto, 1656.
509	Capriccio in G major (DTÖ Capriccio No. 9)	
– 509a	[Fugue eighth tone] in G major	Short version, possibly by Wolfgang Ebner.
– 509b	Capriccio in G major	Short version.
510	Capriccio in D minor (DTÖ Capriccio No. 10)	
– 510a	Capriccio in D minor	Variant of 510.
511	Capriccio in D minor (DTÖ Capriccio No. 11)	Authorship questionable.
512	Capriccio in F major (DTÖ Capriccio No. 12)	
– 512a	Canzona in F major	Variant of 512.
513	Capriccio in E minor (DTÖ Capriccio No. 13)	
514	Capriccio in E minor (DTÖ Capriccio No. 14)	Libro Quarto, 1656.
515	Capriccio in F major (DTÖ Capriccio No. 15)	Libro Quarto, 1656.
516	Capriccio in F major (DTÖ Capriccio No. 16)	Libro Quarto, 1656.
517	Capriccio in A minor (DTÖ Capriccio No. 17)	Libro Quarto, 1656.
518	Capriccio in C major (DTÖ Capriccio No. 18)	
519	Capriccio in C major	
– 519a	Capriccio in A minor	
520	Capriccio in A minor	Sotheby's manuscript, unpublished.
521	Capriccio in E minor	Sotheby's manuscript, unpublished.
522	Capriccio in B♭ major	Sotheby's manuscript, unpublished.
523	Capriccio in E minor	Sotheby's manuscript, unpublished.
524	Capriccio in G major	Sotheby's manuscript, unpublished.
525	Capriccio in F major	Sotheby's manuscript, unpublished.

== Suites (designated "Partitas" by Rampe) and suite movements (601–659) ==
FbWV	Composition	Notes
601	Partita in A minor (DTÖ Suite No. 1)	Libro Secondo, 1649.
– 601a	Partita in A minor	
602	Partita in D minor (DTÖ Suite No. 2)	Libro Secondo, 1649.
– 602a	Partita in D minor	
– 602b	Partita in D minor	
– 602c	Partita in D minor	
603	Partita in G major (DTÖ Suite No. 3)	Libro Secondo, 1649.
– 603a	Partita in G major	
604	Partita in F major (DTÖ Suite No. 4)	Libro Secondo, 1649.
– 604a	Partita in F major	
605	Partita in C major (DTÖ Suite No. 5)	Libro Secondo, 1649.
– 605a	Partita in C major	
– 605b	Partita (Fragment) in C major	Authorship questionable.
606	Partita auff die Mayerin in G major (DTÖ Suite No. 6)	Libro Secondo, 1649.
– 606a	Partita in G major	
607	Partita in E minor (DTÖ Suite No. 7)	Libro Quarto, 1656.
– 607a	Gigue in E minor	
– 607b	Partita in E minor	
– 607c	Gigue in E minor	
608	Partita in A major (DTÖ Suite No. 8)	Libro Quarto, 1656.
609	Partita in G minor (DTÖ Suite No. 9)	Libro Quarto, 1656.
610	Partita in A minor (DTÖ Suite No. 10)	Libro Quarto, 1656.
611	Partita in D major (DTÖ Suite No. 11)	Libro Quarto, 1656.
– 611a	Partita in D major	First movement titled Meditation faist sur ma Mort future la quelle se jove lentement avec discretion.
– 611b	Partita in D major	Appears to be an earlier version of 611.
– 611c	Gigue in D major	
612	Partita in C major (DTÖ Suite No. 12)	Includes Lamento sopra la dolorosa perdita della Real Maestà di Ferdinando IV Rè de Romani.
– 612a	Partita in C major	Early version of 612. Lamentation titled faite sur la tres douloreuse mort de sa mastè Ferdinand le quatrieme Roy de Romanis.
613	Partita in D minor (DTÖ Suite No. 13)	
– 613a	Partita in D minor	Perhaps earlier version of 613.
– 613b/1	Gigue in D minor	
– 613b/2	Gigue in D minor	
– 613b/3	Gigue in D minor	
614	Partita in G minor (DTÖ Suite No. 14)	Includes Lamentation sur ce que j'ay été volé.
615	Partita in A minor (DTÖ Suite No. 15)	Autograph in Sotheby's manuscript, with first movement titled Allemande faicte sur le Couronnement des Sa Majesté Imperiale à Franckfurt.
– 615a	Partita in A minor	
616	Partita in G major (DTÖ Suite No. 16)	
– 616a	Partita in G major	
617	Partita in F major (DTÖ Suite No. 17)	
618	Partita in G minor (DTÖ Suite No. 18)	Autograph in Sotheby's manuscript.
– 618a	Partita in D minor	Later, transposed version of 618.
619	Partita in C minor (DTÖ Suite No. 19)	Autograph in Sotheby's manuscript.
620	Partita in D major (DTÖ Suite No. 20)	Autograph in Sotheby's manuscript. Includes Méditation sur ma mort future, and 'signed' by the composer at the end NB Memento Mori Froberger?.
621	Partita in F major (DTÖ Suite No. 21)	
622	Partita in E minor (DTÖ Suite No. 22)	
623	Partita in E minor (DTÖ Suite No. 23)	
– 623a	Partita in E minor	
– 623b	Saraband in E minor	
– 623c	Chique in E minor	
624	Partita in D major (DTÖ Suite No. 24)	
– 624a	Partita in A minor	
625	Partita in D minor (DTÖ Suite No. 25)	
– 625a	Partita in D minor	Courant only.
626	Partita in D minor (DTÖ Suite No. 26)	
627	Partita in E minor (DTÖ Suite No. 27)	First movement titled Allemande, faite en passant le Rhin dans une barque en grand péril
628	Partita in A minor (DTÖ Suite No. 28)	
– 628a	Partita in A minor	
629	Partita in A minor (DTÖ Suite No. 29)	First two movements of doubtful authenticity.
630	Partita in A minor (DTÖ Suite No. 30)	Includes Plainte faite à Londres pour passer la melancholie.
631	Partita in E♭ major	Numbered 29 nova in Schott's edition. Previously misattributed to Georg Böhm.
632	Tombeau in C minor	Tombeau fait à Paris sur la mort de Monsieur Blanceroche.
– 632a	Tombeau in C minor	Later, extended version.
633	Lamentation / Tombeau in F minor	Autograph in Sotheby's manuscript. Includes Lamentation faite sur la mort très douloureuse de Sa Majesté Impériale, Ferdinand le troisième and inscribed at the end Requiescat in Pace, Amen....
– 634a	Allemande (Fragment) in D minor	Related to an unknown partita?
– 634b	Allemande tres bonne in D minor	Anonymous, probably not by Froberger.
635	Allamand in D minor	Anonymous, attributed to Froberger on stylistic and technical grounds.
636	Aria in D minor	
637	Partita (Fragment) in G major	
638	Partita in A major	Anonymous, attributed to Froberger on stylistic and technical grounds.
– 638a	Partita in A major	Anonymous, likely an early version of 638.
639	Partita in D minor	Anonymous, attributed to Froberger on stylistic and technical grounds.
640	Sarabande in C minor	Related to an unknown partita?
641	Partita in G minor	Anonymous, attributed to Froberger on stylistic and technical grounds.
642	Partita in E minor	Anonymous, attributed to Froberger on stylistic and technical grounds.
643	Partita in E minor	Anonymous, attributed to Froberger on stylistic and technical grounds.
644	Partita in C minor	Anonymous, attributed to Froberger on stylistic and technical grounds. Some movements likely by Froberger's father, Basilius.
645	Partita in E major	Anonymous, attributed to Froberger on stylistic and technical grounds.
646	Partita in F♯ minor	Anonymous, attributed to Froberger on stylistic and technical grounds.
647	Courrante in D minor	Anonymous, related to an unknown partita?
648	Partita Dolorosa in D minor	Anonymous, attributed to Froberger on stylistic and technical grounds.
649	Partita in G minor	Anonymous, attributed to Froberger on stylistic and technical grounds.
650	Allemande in G minor	Anonymous, attributed to Froberger on stylistic and technical grounds.
651	Partita in E minor	Originally attributed to Pachelbel, now attributed to Froberger on stylistic and technical grounds.
652	Partita in B minor	
653	Partita Die Hochstädter Leuchte in F minor	
654	Partita Das Nachtlager in E♭ major	
655	Partita Der Naseweise Orgelprobierer in B major	
656	Partita Der Clavier Trompler in E major	
657	Partita in F major	Sotheby's manuscript, unpublished.
658	Meditation in G minor	Sotheby's manuscript, unpublished. Meditation sur la Mort future de Son Altesse Serenis Madame Sibylle, Duchess de Wirtemberg, Princess de Montbeliard.
659	Tombeau in D minor	Sotheby's manuscript, unpublished. Tombeau sur la tres douloreuse Mort de Son Altesse Serenis Monseigr. le Duc Leopold Friderich de Wirtemberg, Prince de Montbeliard.

== Ensemble Works (701–707) ==
FbWV	Composition	Notes
701	Motet 'Alleluia! Absorpta est mors'	SST, 2 vn, bc.
702	Motet 'Apparuerunt apostolis'	SST, 2 vn, bc.
703	Psalm	SSS, bc. Referenced in literature, but unknown and unpublished.
704	Motetten	Referenced in literature, but unknown and unpublished.
705	Jauchzet dem Herrn	3 voices, 4 instruments. Referenced in literature, but unknown and unpublished.
706	Capriccio in C major	Four instruments.
707	17 Instrumental Dances	Violin, viola da gamba and continuo. Unpublished.

== Appendix ==
FbWV Anh.	Composition	Notes
IV/01	Gique in G major	
IV/02	Partita in B/B♭ major	
IV/03	Gigue in A major	
IV/04	Sarabande in G minor	
IV/05	Partita (Fragment) in G minor	
IV/06	Allemande in D minor	
IV/07	Courante (Fragment) in G minor	
IV/08	Partita in F major	
IV/09	Allemande in A major	
IV/10	Sarabande in F major	
