= Academic press =

Academic press may refer to:

- An independent commercial press or subsidized university press focusing on the academic publishing market
- Academic Press, an academic publishing company

== See also ==
- Library publishing
- University press
- Akademie Verlag
- Spektrum Akademischer Verlag (SAV)
- Akademische Verlagsanstalt (AVA)
- Akademische Druck- und Verlagsanstalt (ADEVA)
- Akademische Verlagsgesellschaft (disambiguation)
