= Walter Graf =

- Walter Graf may refer to:
- Walter Graf (bobsledder) (1937–2021), Swiss bobsledder
- Walter Graf (musicologist) (1903–1982), Austrian musicologist
- Walter S. Graf (1917– 2015), American cardiologist
