= Josef-Horst Lederer =

Austrian musicologist

Josef-Horst Lederer (born 18 September 1944) is an Austrian musicologist.

== Life ==
Born in Celje, Styria, today Slovenia, Lederer studied musicology with Othmar Wessely at the University of Music and Performing Arts Graz. He also studied piano and music theory at the University of Music and Performing Arts Graz. He gained his Doctorate in 1971 with a thesis on Lorenzo Penna. (1613–1693). Josef-Horst Lederer: Lorenzo Penna und seine Kontrapunkttheorie.

Initially he worked as an assistant at the Musicological Institute of the University of Mainz in 1971/1972 with Hellmut Federhofer.In 1973 he moved back to Graz where he habilitated in 1985 in the field of historical musicology. In 1987 he was awarded the rank of associate professor.

Lederer is involved in the New Mozart Edition, the Gluck and the Johann Joseph Fux complete editions, but also on various committees.

His research focuses on opera and symphonic music.
