= Karl Geiringer =

Austrian-American musicologist (1899–1989)

Karl Geiringer (April 26, 1899 – January 10, 1989) was an Austrian-American musicologist, educator, and biographer of composers. He was educated in Vienna but at the beginning of the Nazi years he emigrated to England and ultimately the United States, where he had a lengthy and distinguished career at several universities. He was a noted authority on Brahms, Haydn, and the Bach family, and a prolific author.

== Life ==
Geiringer was born in Vienna, the son of Louis and Martha (nee Wertheimer) Geiringer. He studied music history at the University of Vienna under Guido Adler and Curt Sachs, and studied composition under Hans Gál. He also studied at the University of Berlin under Curt Sachs. He received his Ph.D. in musicology from the University of Vienna in 1923. The topic of his doctoral thesis was the musical instruments appearing in Renaissance painting. Following his degree he worked as an editor for Adler's journal Denkmäler der Tonkunst in Österreich; he remained on the editorial board of this publication for the rest of his life.

In 1930 he won a top position in the musicological field, as the curator of the archives at the Gesellschaft der Musikfreunde in Vienna, a position previously held by his mentor Eusebius Mandyczewski and other distinguished scholars. The job gave Geiringer access to much valuable primary source material on Western music, which he used extensively in his scholarship. An unusual responsibility Geiringer bore at the Gesellschaft archives was the curatorship of Joseph Haydn's skull, which had been stolen from his grave in 1809. In the first English edition of his Haydn biography (1946), Geiringer reminisced about bringing forth the skull to show to visitors; see Haydn's head.

In 1938, Austria was incorporated into Nazi Germany in the Anschluss. With the Nazi occupation, the Gesellschaft was closed. Geiringer, although he had been baptized a Roman Catholic, was the child of Jewish parents; hence he and his family were in grave danger, and they fled the country. He first went to London, where he taught at the Royal College of Music and served as a broadcaster for the BBC. He also worked extensively as an editor for the Grove Dictionary of Music and Musicians; according to his later colleagues he was "in all but name a co-editor".

In 1940, Geiringer moved to America, becoming an American citizen in 1945. He taught first for a year as a visiting professor at Hamilton College in Clinton, N.Y. The following year he took up a professorial appointment at Boston University, where he directed the graduate program and remained for 21 years. Among his students was H. C. Robbins Landon. His final academic appointment began in 1962, when he moved to the University of California at Santa Barbara, in order to establish the graduate program in musicology. Throughout this time, he continued to publish extensively.

In 1973 he became an emeritus professor, but continued to be very active: his colleagues said of him, "His 'retirement' ... proved to be more of a technicality than a reality—his teaching and research continued unabatedly and were interrupted only by death itself." He died in Santa Barbara at the age of 89 of complications from injuries sustained in a fall.

Geiringer was twice married. His first wife, and longtime coauthor, was Irene Geiringer (1899–1983). He was later married to Bernice Geiringer (née Abrams, 1918–2001), a concert pianist and student of Arnold Schoenberg. He had twin sons, Martin and Ludwig.

== Scholarship ==
Geiringer served twice as president of the American Musicological Society. In 1959 he was elected to the American Academy of Arts and Sciences. His last university, UC Santa Barbara, established a lecture program in his name in 1994 and named a concert hall in his honor.

As Crutchfield notes, "It was Mr. Geiringer's habit to take on the largest topics". His work included extensive biographies of Brahms, Haydn, and of the Bach family, which went through multiple editions. He also wrote many scholarly articles. He was responsible for the rediscovery of minor works by Brahms and by Hugo Wolf that had gone missing.

Following his death, his colleagues assessed his research as follows:

[His] prolific scholarly output, when viewed in its totality, is remarkable for its great scope and depth. His writings and editions span practically the complete range of music history and all carry the mark of a discipline he must have possessed as a student and an excellence we know he had as a teacher. His most significant achievements, if they can at all be pinpointed, lay in the areas of Bach and Haydn research, in his studies of these two masters written, revised and enlarged over a period of a halfcentury in collaboration with his brilliant first wife, Irene, and in his lifelong effort to see that a collected edition of Haydn's works be realized for the first time in our century.

Geiringer himself assessed his career as follows: "It seems to me that, as far as my fate allowed it, I have made adequate use of the modest resources with which nature endowed me".

== Notable works ==
- (1936) Brahms: His Life and Work, Houghton Mifflin.
- (1945) Musical Instruments, Their History in Western Culture from the Stone Age to the Present, Oxford University Press. ISBN 978-0-19-519027-4.
- (1946 (1st ed.), 3rd and final edition 1984 with Irene Geiringer) Haydn: A Creative Life in Music, W. W. Norton.
- (1954) The Bach Family: Seven Generations of Creative Genius, Oxford University Press.
- (1966) Johann Sebastian Bach: The Culmination of an Era, Oxford University Press. ISBN 0-19-500554-6.
- (1981) with Irene Geiringer, Stephen and Nancy Storace in Vienna, in Essays on the Music of J.S. Bach and other divers subjects: a tribute to Gerhard Herz, pages 235–244. Edited by Eobert L. Weaver. University of Louisville, Louisville, Kentucky. ISBN 9992663537
- (1993) This I Remember. Santa Barbara, CA: Fithian Press.
- (2002) Joseph Haydn and the Eighteenth Century: Collected Essays of Karl Geiringer. Edited by Robert N. Freeman. Warren, MI: Harmonie Park Press. ISBN 0-89990-112-3.
- (2006) with George S. Bozarth, On Brahms and his circle: Essays and documentary studies, revised and enlarged by George S. Bozarth with a foreword by Walter Frisch. Sterling Heights, Mich.: Harmonie Park Press. ISBN 978-0-89990-136-7.
