= Patricia Jünger =

Swiss-Austrian multi-media artist, conductor, sound director and composer

Patricia Jünger (born 6 August 1951) is a Swiss-Austrian multi-media artist, conductor, sound director and composer. Jünger studied at the Vienna Music Academy, and worked first as a pianist and organist before becoming a composer and conductor. Jünger has won a number of awards, among them the Theodor Körner Prize for Composition, the Vienna Cultural Foundation Prize, scholarships from the Viennese Alban Berg Foundation and Basel's Paul Sacher Foundation, and was the first woman composer to win the Karl Sczuka Prize from SWF Baden-Baden, which she was awarded in 1986, for the radio play 'Sehr geehrter Herr - ein Requiem'.

== Biography ==
Jünger was born during an airplane trip from Dublin to Vienna, at a stop in Frankfurt am Main, and has Swiss and Austrian citizenship. Her parents were a jazz singer and a pianist. Jünger studied piano, organ, composition and directing in Frankfurt am Main, Vienna and Paris. At the Vienna Music Academy between 1971 and 1978, she studied organ with Alois Forer and Robert Scholz, composition with Erich Romanovsky, and conducting with Karl Österreicher. She completed her studies in 1977 and then worked first as a pianist and organist. She later became a full-time composer, with her own studio, and a conductor. Recently she has leaned toward more electroacoustic works. When she was awarded the Karl Sczuka Prize from SWF Baden-Baden in 1986, for the radio play 'Sehr geehrter Herr - ein Requiem', she was the first woman composer to receive the prize.

== Honours and awards ==
Jünger has won a number of awards, including:

- Theodor Körner Prize for Composition, 1979
- Vienna Cultural Foundation Prize, 1979
- Scholarship from the Viennese Alban Berg Foundation, 1980
- Scholarship from Basel's Paul Sacher Foundation, 1980
- Bursary for composition by the Austrian state, 1981 and 1983
- Sabbatical year for composition, canton of Aargau, 1983
- Karl Sczuka Prize from SWF Baden-Baden, 1986, for the radio play 'Sehr geehrter Herr - ein Requiem'

== Works ==
Selected works include:

- Sehr geehrter Herr - ein Requiem, radio play (1986)
- Transmitter
- Valse éternelle – ein Brief, radio play
- Muttertagsfeier, oder Die Zerstückelung des weiblichen Körpers (1984)
- Erziehung eines Vampirs, radio play (1986)
- Die Klavierspielerin, opera (1988)

== Selected recordings ==
Jünger's works have been recorded and issued on CD, including:

- Patricia Jünger: Eva Csapo, Collegium Musicum Zürich, Musiques Suisses (CD, 2006), ASIN: B000J10K4Q
- Die Klavierspielerin (Der Audio Verlag, September 2005), ISBN 3-89813-479-2
- Bright Light, for mezzo-soprano, clarinet, drums and orchestra (MGB, DDD, 1989)
