= Grieskirchen =

- Municipality
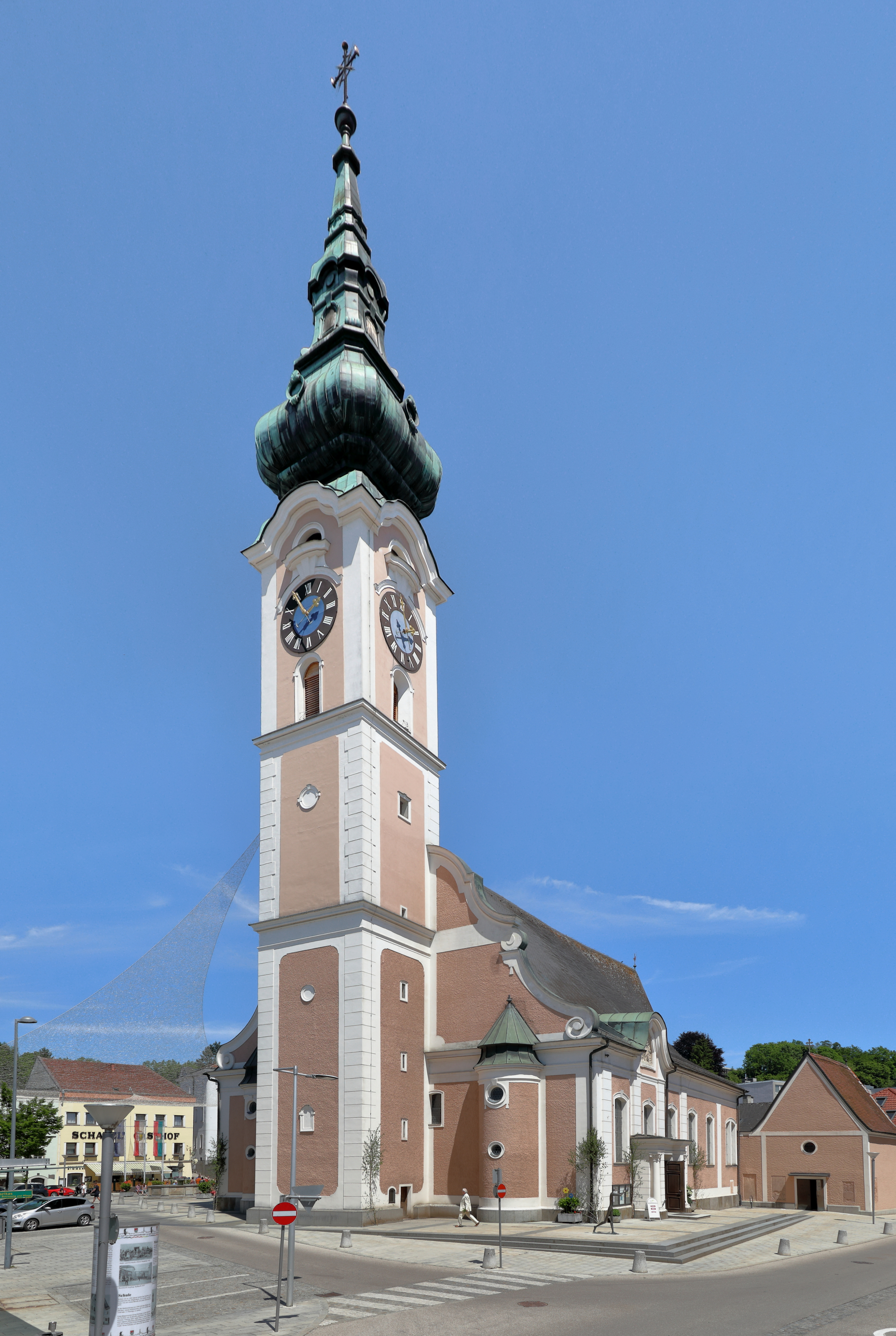
- Saint Martin Church

- Coat of arms

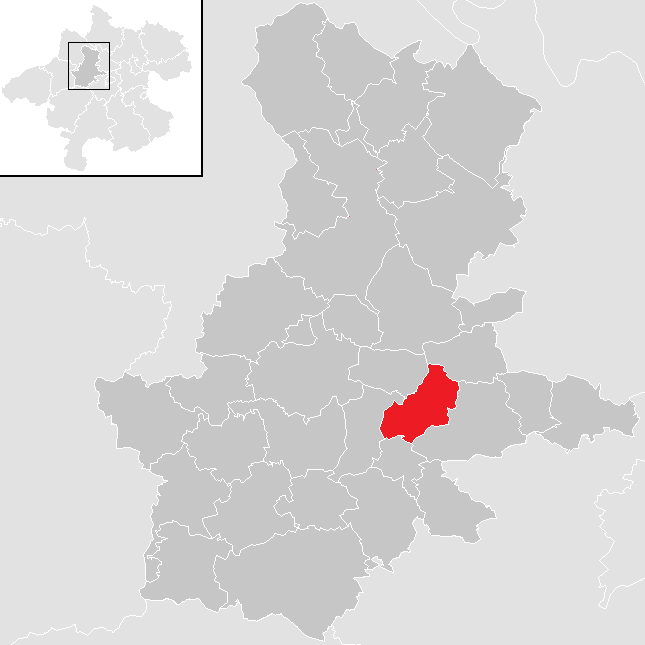
- Location in the district

- Location within Austria
- Coordinates: 48°14′08″N 13°49′35″E
- Country: Austria
- State: Upper Austria
- District: Grieskirchen

Government
  - Mayor: Maria Pachner (ÖVP)

Area
  - Total: 11.72 km^{2} (4.53 sq mi)
- Elevation: 335 m (1,099 ft)

Population (2018-01-01)
  - Total: 5,002
  - Density: 426.8/km^{2} (1,105/sq mi)
- Time zone: UTC+1 (CET)
  - Summer (DST): UTC+2 (CEST)
- Postal code: 4710
- Area code: 07248
- Vehicle registration: GR
- Website: www.grieskirchen.at

Grieskirchen is a town in Austria. It is capital of the Grieskirchen district of Upper Austria, in the Trattnachtal valley.

== Notable people ==
- Karin Bonelli (born 1988), flutist with the Vienna State Opera orchestra
- Franz Födermayr (1933–2020), musicologist, was born in the town
- Otto Prechtler (1813–1881), dramatist and librettist, was born in the town
- Ferdinand von Sammern-Frankenegg (1897–1944), SS functionary

== Population ==
Historical population
Year	Pop.	±%
1869	2,322	—
1880	2,379	+2.5%
1890	2,372	−0.3%
1900	2,473	+4.3%
1910	2,593	+4.9%
1923	2,749	+6.0%
1934	2,935	+6.8%
1939	3,075	+4.8%
1951	4,039	+31.3%
1961	4,237	+4.9%
1971	4,534	+7.0%
1981	4,814	+6.2%
1991	4,960	+3.0%
2001	4,802	−3.2%
2011	4,870	+1.4%
2016	4,902	+0.7%
2018	5,002	+2.0%
