= Alban Berg Foundation =

The Alban Berg Foundation (Alban Berg Stiftung) is an Austrian organisation dedicated to the legacy of the composer Alban Berg (1885–1935). Founded in 1969 by the composer's widow, it cultivates the memory and works of the composer, and awards scholarships.

== History ==
After Alban Berg's death in 1935, his widow Helene Berg (1885–1976) looked after his inheritance and estate, including the preservation of manuscripts and important documents, and in later years she made preparations to establish a foundation; in accordance with Berg's wishes, it would receive the proceeds of the composer's works after her death. The establishment of the foundation was finally prepared in 1967–68, and approved by the municipal council of Vienna in 1969.

== Aims and activities ==
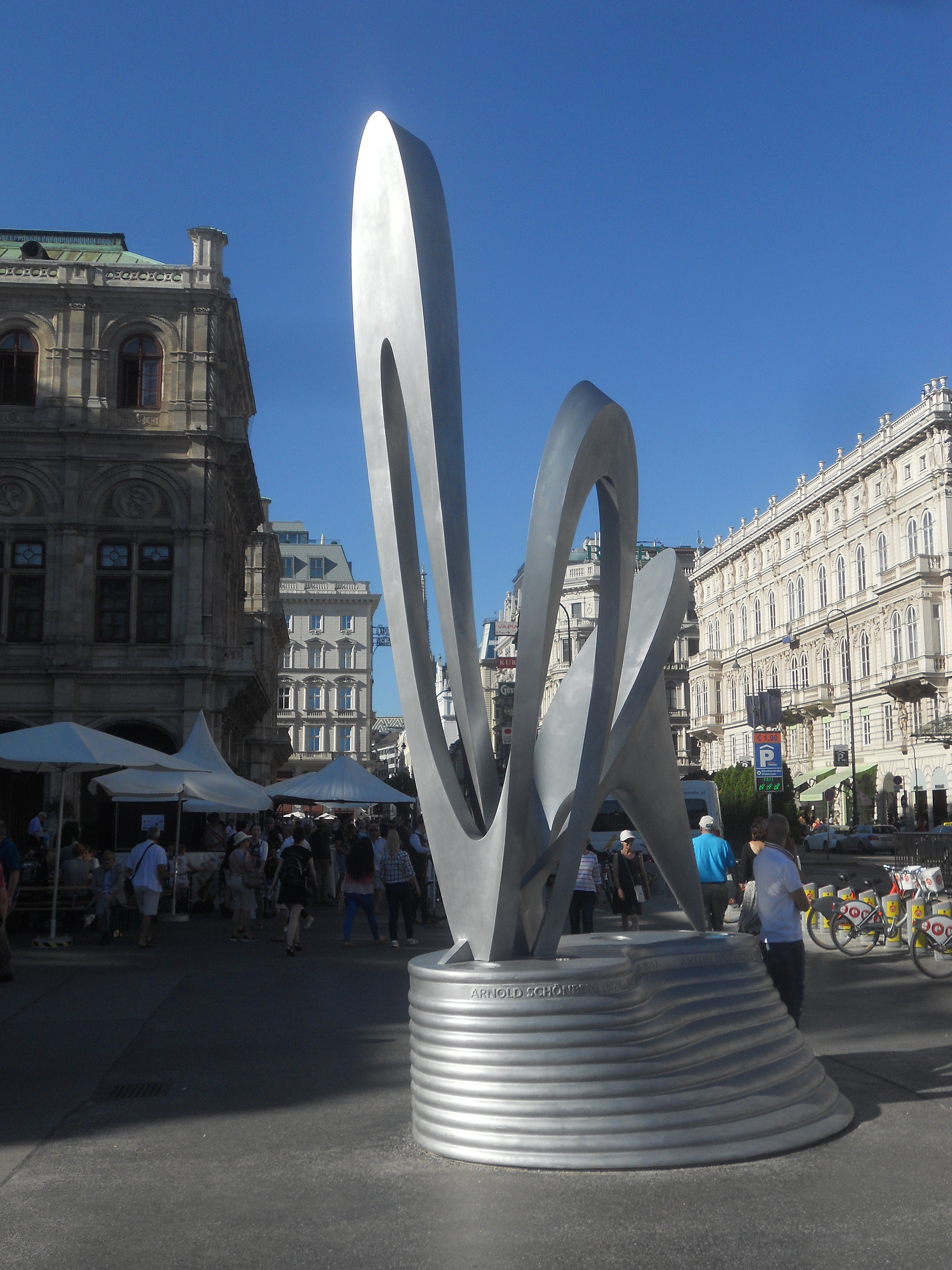
The Alban Berg Monument, Vienna

The foundation serves the promotion of music, by awarding scholarships and grants to deserving music students, and by caring for the memory and works of Alban Berg. The board of trustees, which holds an ordinary meeting in spring and autumn, decides on funding in accordance with the foundation's purpose.

The foundation publishes the Gesamtausgabe (complete edition) of Berg's works. It is based on all the available surviving sources, in particular the autograph scores and the printed works approved by the composer. Overall responsibility for the complete edition was in the hands of Rudolf Stephan until 2015; since 2015 Martin Eybl has taken responsibility.

The Alban Berg Monument, funded by the foundation, and designed by Wolf Dieter Prix and Sophie C. Grell of Coop Himmelb(l)au, was erected in 2016 in front of the Vienna State Opera.
