= Alard du Gaucquier =

Holy Roman Empire choirmaster

- Born: c. 1534; Lille
- Died: c. 1582 (aged 47–48)
- Other name: Alard Nuceus
- Occupations: kappellmeister, composer, teacher

Alard du Gaucquier (c. 1534 – c. 1582) was a choirmaster at the Imperial Chapel of the Holy Roman Empire. He began composing noted Magnificats and masses in 1574.

According to the City Archives of Antwerp, Gaucquier was born in Lille sometime around 1534. Approximately in the year 1558 he entered the service of the Holy Roman Emperor, Maximilian II as a tenor singer.

At the January 1567 death of Jacobus Vaet, Gaucquier was appointed interim Kapellmeister and was given a trial. Evidently Emperor Maximillian II did not find Gaucquier entirely suitable to the role, for he appointed his ambassador to Rome, Count Prospero d'Arco, to find a permanent replacement for Vaet, with a note expressing dissatisfaction with Gaucquier's performance. He was indeed replaced by Philippe de Monte on 1 May 1568, but the position of vice-Kapellmeister was created specifically for Gaucquier. He was given a patent of nobility at the same time, acquiring a coat of arms depicting a nut tree. In addition to his court duties he was music teacher to the younger sons of Maximilian. In 1578, he requested release from his employment after having served the Holy Roman Emperor for twenty years, which was granted by Rudolf II along with a lifelong pension of 100 guilders. He moved to the Netherlands to become a conductor for his former pupil, Matthias, while the latter was acting as Governor-General there.

He received an invitation from Archduke Ferdinand II to become Kapellmeister at his Innsbruck court. Gaucquier left Brussels on 29 October 1581 to accept this position but he never arrived there. There is no further mention of Gaucquier until his widow was granted a pauper's pension of 50 florins in March, 1583.

== Works ==
In 1574 eight Magnificats, scored for four to six voices, were published in Venice. A set of four masses scored for five to eight voices was published in Antwerp in 1581. An additional four-voice mass has been attributed to him. His works are in cantus firmus, with significant instances of indirect chromaticism and dissonant false relations.
