= Akademische Verlagsgesellschaft (disambiguation) =

Akademische Verlagsgesellschaft (AVG), also with Becker & Erler and Geest & Portig additions, is a former (East-)German publishing house founded in Leipzig in 1906 and dissolved in 1991. There was a West-German namesake in Frankfurt am Main and Wiesbaden.

Akademische Verlagsgesellschaft may also refer to:

- Akademische Verlagsgesellschaft AKA (AKA), a German publisher since 1996
- Akademische Verlagsgesellschaft Athenaion (Ath), a former German publisher in Potsdam
- Jenaer Akademische Verlagsgesellschaft (JAVG), a German publisher in Jena

== See also ==
- Akademische Verlagsanstalt (AVA), a German publisher founded in Leipzig in 1992
- Akademische Druck- und Verlagsanstalt (ADEVA), an Austrian publisher in Graz
- Akademischer Verlag, a former publisher in (East-)Berlin
- Akademischer Verlag Hans-Dieter Heinz, a German publisher in Stuttgart
- Spektrum Akademischer Verlag (SAV), a former German publisher founded 1991 in Heidelberg
- Akademie Verlag, a German publisher founded in 1946 in Berlin
- Academic Press, an American publisher founded in 1941/1942 in New York
- Kluwer Academic Publishers
