= Christoph Kammertöns =

German musicologist (born 1966)

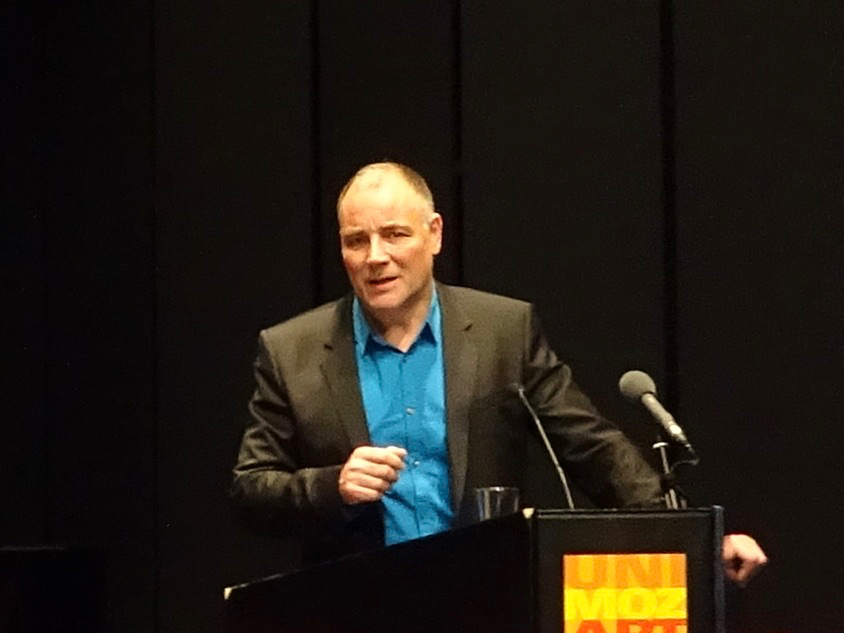
Christoph Kammertöns, seminar about "András Schiff and the Goldberg Variations", 22 November 2018, Mozarteum University Salzburg

Christoph Kammertöns (born 1966) is a German musicologist and music educator.

== Life ==
Born in Bochum, Kammertöns studied instrumental pedagogy (piano) at the Folkwang University of the Arts as well as musicology, educational science, philosophy and history at the same place, at the University of Duisburg-Essen and at the University of Hagen. With a dissertation on Henri Herz in the mirror of the French music criticism of his time, he was awarded the doctorate in 1999.

His musicological interest is directed towards the piano and its music, the distinctive character of the piano as an "instrument of domination", and generally on instrumental and symbolic functions of bourgeois musical culture. In addition, he is concerned with musical-philosophical questions among others on openness and incompleteness, corporeality and performative utterance. Kammertöns is also a teacher of music, education and philosophy. He previously worked, among other things, as a dramaturge for dance at the Luzerner Theater as well as a ballet pianist.

== Publications (selection) ==
- Friedrich Wiecks "Clavier und Gesang" und andere musikpädagogische Schriften. Annotated ed. by Tomi Mäkelä and Christoph Kammertöns. Von Bockel Verlag, Hamburg 1998, ISBN 3-932696-02-6.
- Chronique Scandaleuse. Henri Herz – ein Enfant terrible in der französischen Musikkritik des 19. Jahrhunderts (Folkwang-Texte Volume 15). Die blaue Eule, Essen 2000, ISBN 3-89206-999-9 (323 p.; Dr. phil. thesis, 1999).
- Lexikon des Klaviers. Baugeschichte, Spielpraxis, Komponisten und ihre Werke, Interpreten. Edited by Christoph Kammertöns and Siegfried Mauser, with a foreword by Daniel Barenboim. Laaber-Verlag, Laaber 2006, ISBN 3-89007-543-6.
- Das Klavier. Instrument und Musik (Beck'sche Reihe. 2752; C. H. Beck Wissen), Munich 2013, ISBN 978-3-406-63719-3.
- Friedrich Wieck – Gesammelte Schriften über Musik und Musiker. Aufsätze und Aphorismen über Geschmack, Lebenswelt, Virtuosität, Musikerziehung und Stimmbildung, mit Kommentaren und mit einer historischen Einführung (Interdisziplinäre Studien zur Musik, vol. 10). Edited by Tomi Mäkelä, Christoph Kammertöns and Lena Esther Ptasczynski. Peter Lang, Berlin 2019, ISBN 978-3-631-76747-4.
