= Rudolf Flotzinger =

Austrian musicologist

Rudolf Flotzinger (born 22 September 1939) is an Austrian musicologist.

== Career ==
Born in Vorchdorf (Austria), Flotzinger graduated from the Stiftsgymnasium Kremsmünster where he was a student from 1951 to 1958. He then pursued concurrent studies at the Academy of Fine Arts Vienna (1958–1964) and the University of Vienna (1959–1964). At the Academy of Fine Arts he studied music composition with Karl Schiske, and at the University of Vienna he studied musicology with Erich Schenk and Walter Graf.

In 1964 Flotzinger's doctoral dissertation on lute tablatures in Kremsmünster, Die Lautentabulaturen des Stiftes Kremsmünster, was published by the University of Vienna, and he received his doctorate from that institution in 1965. He remained at that institution doing further research and teaching, and received his habilitation at the University of Vienna in 1969 following his scholarly research into early music at the Notre-Dame de Paris.

In 1971 Flotzinger left Vienna to succeed Othmar Wessely as chairman of the institute for musicology of the University of Graz. He remained in that post until 1999 when he became chairman of the board of the Kommission für Musikforschung at the Austrian Academy of Sciences; a position he held until 2006.

As a musicologist, Flotzinger has mainly published content and pursued research in the areas of medieval music (particularly early polyphony) and the music history of Austria. From 1992 until 1999 he was editor of the journal Acta musicologica. He also co-edited the three-volume Musikgeschichte Österreichs and was editor of the five-volume Oesterreichisches Musiklexikon in addition to serving as a member of the Academia Europaea in London as well as corresponding member of the Academy of Sciences in Vienna, Zagreb and Ljubljana.

Composer Georg Friedrich Haas remembers Flotzinger as part of an informal group that continued to adhere to the aesthetic and political norms of the 1938–45 era in post-war Austria. Within the circle of the Secretary of State for Cultural Affairs in Styria during the Nazi period, Josef Papesch, Haas records in his memoir Through Poisoned Times (Durch vergiftete Zeiten), he had met in the 1960s "the Nazi painter Ernst von Dombrowski. I also came across Rudolf Flotzinger, soon to be appointed to the Chair of Musicology at the University of Graz. [...] [Dombrowski] died without children; he gave his money to a private foundation that would bestow, in his name, awards on Styrian composers, writers and visual artists. Member of jury of the first award for musical composition turned out to be the very professor of musicology I had met at Papesch′s home." Flotzinger granted the first Dombrowski award for a composer in 1988 to Hannes Kuegerl (1906–1990) who had garnered attention, i.a., with his 1942 Heroic Suite (Heldische Suite) for symphony orchestra, a musical glorification of Germany’s war of aggression at the time, first performed in Graz in 1943.
