= Alban Berg Monument, Vienna =

Alban Berg Monument
- Alban-Berg-Denkmal
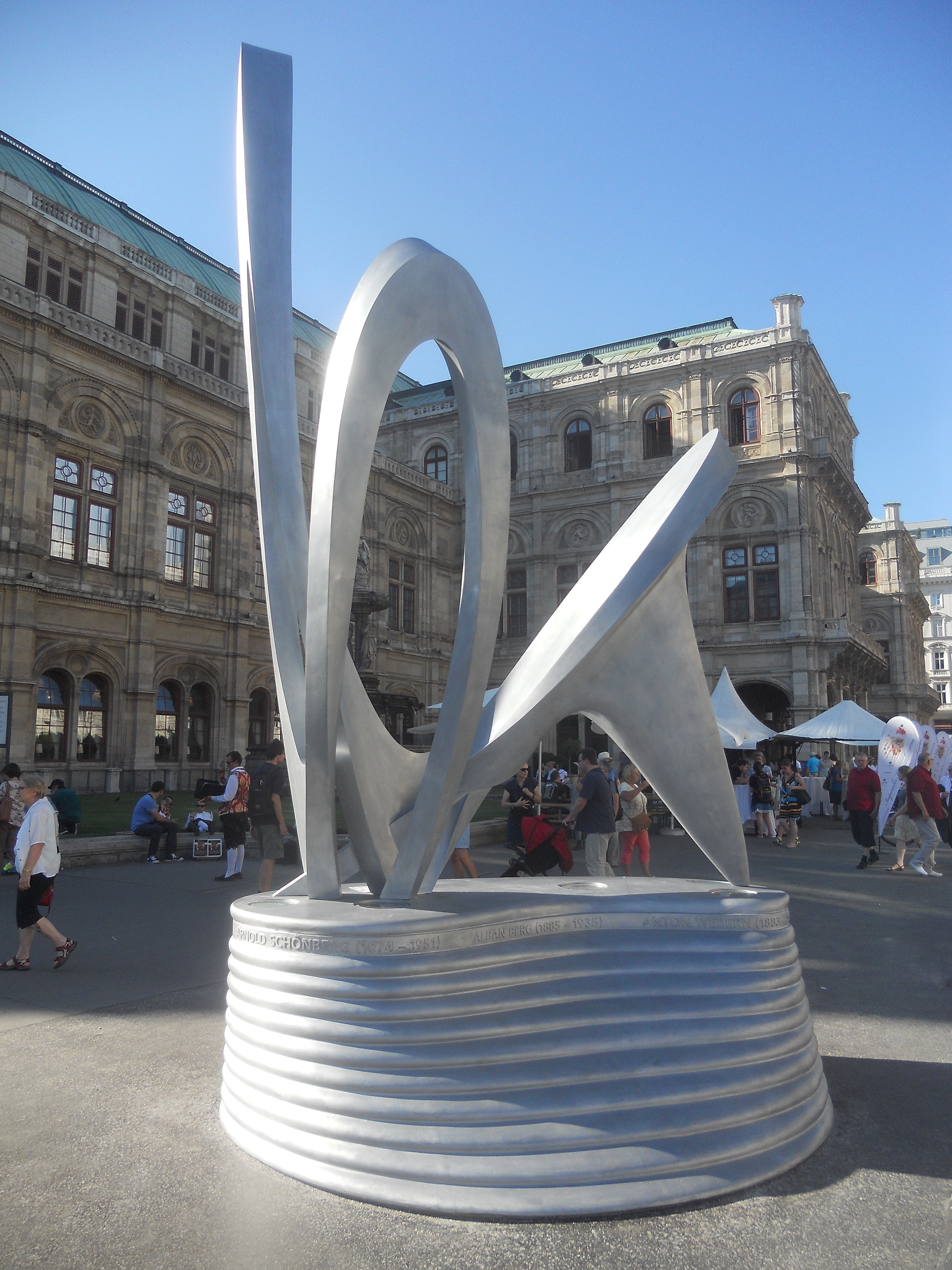
- Interactive map of the Alban Berg Monument area

General information
- Location: Herbert-von-Karajan-Platz, Austria
- Coordinates: 48°12′09.63″N 16°22′10.57″E
- Inaugurated: June 2016

Technical details
- Material: Aluminium

Design and construction
- Architecture firm: Coop Himmelb(l)au

The Alban Berg Monument, in Vienna, Austria, is a memorial to the composer Alban Berg (1885–1935), unveiled in 2016. It is situated on Herbert-von-Karajan-Platz next to Vienna State Opera.

== History ==
The project, funded by the Alban Berg Foundation, began in April 2015, and was managed by Werner Baumüller. The monument was designed by Wolf Dieter Prix and Sophie C. Grell of Coop Himmelb(l)au, and the structural design was by Bollinger & Grohmann.

== Description ==
The monument was unveiled in June 2016. It is made of cast aluminium, and weighs about 1.5 tonnes. Its height is about 5.5 metres (18 ft).

Prix, whose great-uncle Klaus Maetzl was a violinist in the Alban Berg Quartet, described the sculpture as reacting to the expressive lines of the music with expansive loops. He said that it is "frozen music, that stands in the right place." The sculpture is on a pedestal one metre high, consisting of twelve steps, referring to the twelve-tone technique used by the composer.

The monument is also intended to pay tribute to three composers who were colleagues of Berg: Arnold Schoenberg, Anton Webern and Gustav Mahler, director of the court opera in Vienna.

Andreas Mailath-Pokorny, Viennese councillor for culture during the realization of the project, said that the monument is "a striking symbol of artistic obstinacy and the courage to innovate".
