= Johann Evangelist Habert =

Composer, organist, and writer on music (1833–1896)

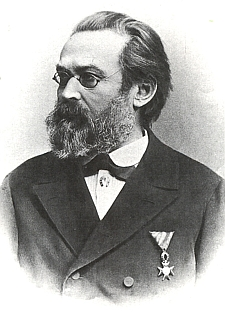
Johann Evangelist Habert, 1894

Johann (Note: Also Johannes or Jan) Evangelist (Note: Also Evangelista) Habert (18 October 1833 – 1 September 1896) was a Czech composer, organist, and writer on music.

== Life ==
Habert was born in Oberplan (Horní Planá). His nationality may be Austrian or Czech. He received music education from his family and learned several instruments. He took a teacher training course in Linz under Wenzel Pranghofer, becoming a schoolteacher in Naarn im Machlande (from 1852) and Waizenkirchen (from 1857). In 1861, Habert settled in Gmunden as an organist. From 1878, he was a choral director there. He founded in 1868 and edited the Zeitschrift für katholische Kirchenmusik (Magazine for Catholic Church Music) until 1883. He also published the four-volume composition textbook Beiträge zur Lehre von der musikalischen Komposition (Leipzig, 1899). He died in Gmunden.

== Works ==
Habert was a prolific composer of sacred music, including masses, offertorios, litanies, and motets. The composer also wrote orchestral, chamber music, piano pieces, and songs. His complete works were published by Breitkopf & Härtel.

In his magazine which he edited until 1883, Habert opposed the Cecilianist movement, supporting instrumentally-accompanied liturgical music. His editions included works by Robert Führer and three volumes of church music.
