= Nicolaus Zangius =

German composer (1570–1619)

Nicolaus Zangius (also Zange; 1570–1619) was a German composer.

Zangius was born in Woltersdorf, and became kapellmeister for Philipp Sigismund, Prince Bishop of Osnabrück and later John Sigismund, Elector of Brandenburg. He died in Berlin.

== Works, editions and recordings ==
- Schoene newe außerlesene Geistliche und Weltliche Lieder mit drey Stimmen. Frankfurt an der Oder 1594.
- Geistliche und weltliche Lieder mit fünf Stimmen. Cologne 1597.

=== Modern editions ===
- Geistliche und weltliche Lieder mit fünf Stimmen. Merseburger 1960.
- Ducke dich, Hänsel. Möseler-Verlag 1972.
- Dialogus 1617. Moeck 1972.
- Der Kölner Markt. Edition Peters 1986.
