= Tomi Mäkelä =

Finnish and German musicologist and pianist

Tomi Matti Mäkelä (born 3 January 1964 in Lahti) is a Finnish musicologist and pianist, professor at the Martin-Luther-Universität Halle-Wittenberg in Germany. He studied music and musicology in Lahti, Vienna, Berlin (West) and Helsinki. As a pianist he studied with Rauno Jussila and Noel Flores. He got his doctoral degree 1988 in Berlin under the guidance of Carl Dahlhaus. He has published widely on the music of the nineteenth and twentieth century. His German book on Sibelius Poesie in der Luft (Breitkopf & Härtel 2007) got the award Geisteswissenschaft international 2008 and was published in English translation by Steven Lindberg as Jean Sibelius (2011). 2023 Tomi Mäkelä received the Fredrik-Pacius-Award of the Swedish Literature Society in Finland (Svenska litteratursällskapet i Finland).

== Works ==
- Die Schuld des Bossa Nova? Heilsame, mächtige und sündhafte Töne im Wandel der Zeiten, Schüren: Marburg 2026; ISBN 978-3-7410-0564-0; 330 pages.
- Sichtbare, hörbare und denkbare Töne. Inszeniertes Musikgeschehen im Tonfilm zwischen The Jazz Singer und Anora, Peter Lang: Berlin, Bruxelles, Chennai, Lausanne, New York, Oxford 2025, ISBN 978-3-631-93589-7
- with Christoph Kammertöns & Lena Esther Ptasczynski (eds.): Friedrich Wieck – Gesammelte Schriften über Musik und Musiker [...] mit einer Einführung [by Tomi Mäkelä] (Interdisziplinäre Studien zur Musik 10), Peter Lang, Frankfurt am Main etc. 2019; ISBN 9783631767450; 390 pages
- Saariaho, Sibelius und andere. Neue Helden des neuen Nordens. 100 Jahre Musik und Bildung in Finnland, Georg Olms, Hildesheim etc. 2014; ISBN 978-3-487-15128-1
- Friedrich Pacius. Ein deutscher Komponist in Finnland. Mit einer Edition der Tagebücher, Briefe und Arbeitsmaterialien von Silke Bruns, Georg Olms, Hildesheim etc. 2014; ISBN 978-3-487-15123-6
- Jean Sibelius und seine Zeit, Laaber, Laaber 2013; ISBN 978-3-89007-767-3
- Jean Sibelius, Boydell, Woodbridge, Suffolk, and Rochester, NY 2011; ISBN 9781843836889; 536 pages
- Fredrik Pacius, kompositör i Finland, Svenska Litteratursällskapet i Finland, Helsinki 2009; ISBN 978-951-583-192-7; 268 pages
- Sibelius, me ja muut, Teos, Helsinki 2007; ISBN 978-951-851-097-3
- Jean Sibelius. "Poesie in der Luft“. Studien zu Leben und Werk, Breitkopf & Härtel, Wiesbaden-Leipzig-Paris 2007; ISBN 978-3-7651-0363-6
- Klang und Linie von Pierrot lunaire bis Ionisation. Studien zur Wechselwirkung von Spezialensemble, Formbildung und Klangfarbenpolyphonie (Interdisziplinäre Studien zur Musik 3), Peter Lang, Frankfurt/ M 2004
- Tomi Mäkelä, Tobias Robert Klein (Eds.), Mehrsprachigkeit und regionale Bindung in Musik und Literatur (Interdisziplinäre Studien zur Musik 1), Peter Lang, Frankfurt/ M 2004
- Aarre Merikantos Konzert ("Schott-Konzert“) (Nordische Meisterwerke 2, Eds. Heinrich W. Schwab/ Harald Herrestahl), Florian Noetzel, Wilhelmshafen 1996
- Virtuosität und Werkcharakter. Eine analytische und theoretische Untersuchung zur Virtuosität in den Klavierkonzerten der Hochromantik. (Berliner musikwissenschaftliche Arbeiten 37, Eds. Carl Dahlhaus/ Rudolf Stephan), Katzbichler, München/ Salzburg 1989
- Training and the Knowledge-Based Society. An Evaluation of Doctoral Education in Finland / David D. Dill, Sanjit K. Mitra, Hans Siggaard Jensen, Erno Lehtinen, Tomi Mäkelä, Anna Parpala, Hannele Pohjola, Mary A. Ritter & Seppo Saari, PhD (Publications of the Finnish Higher Education Evaluation Council 2006, 1, FHEEC, Tampere 2006
