= Pieter Maessins =

Choirmaster and composer (1505–1562)

Pieter Maessins (Ghent, 1505; Benfeld 12 December 1562) was choirmaster of Notre Dame de Courtrai, and a composer at the Habsburg court of Ferdinand II and Maximilian II.

== Selected works ==
- Discessu
- En venant de Lyon
- In dedicatione huius templi
