= Johannes Wolf (musicologist) =

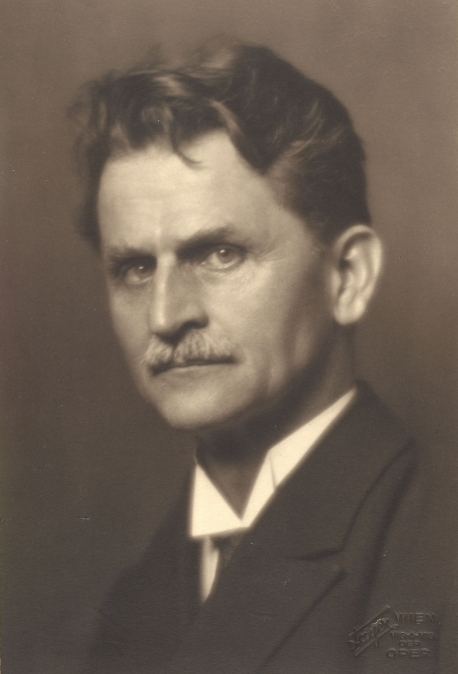
- Johannes Wolf in 1927
- Born: Johannes Wolf; 17 April 1869; Berlin, Germany
- Died: 25 May 1947 (aged 78); Munich, Germany
- Education: Friedrich Wilhelm University; Berlin University
- Occupations: musicologist, archivist and teacher

Johannes Wolf (17 April 1869 – 25 May 1947) was a German musicologist, archivist and teacher, known for his research on medieval and Renaissance music, particularly Ars Nova, and early music notation.

Born in Berlin, Wolf studied music history under Philip Spitta and Heinrich Bellermann at the Friedrich Wilhelm University. He completed his doctorate at the Berlin University in 1902.

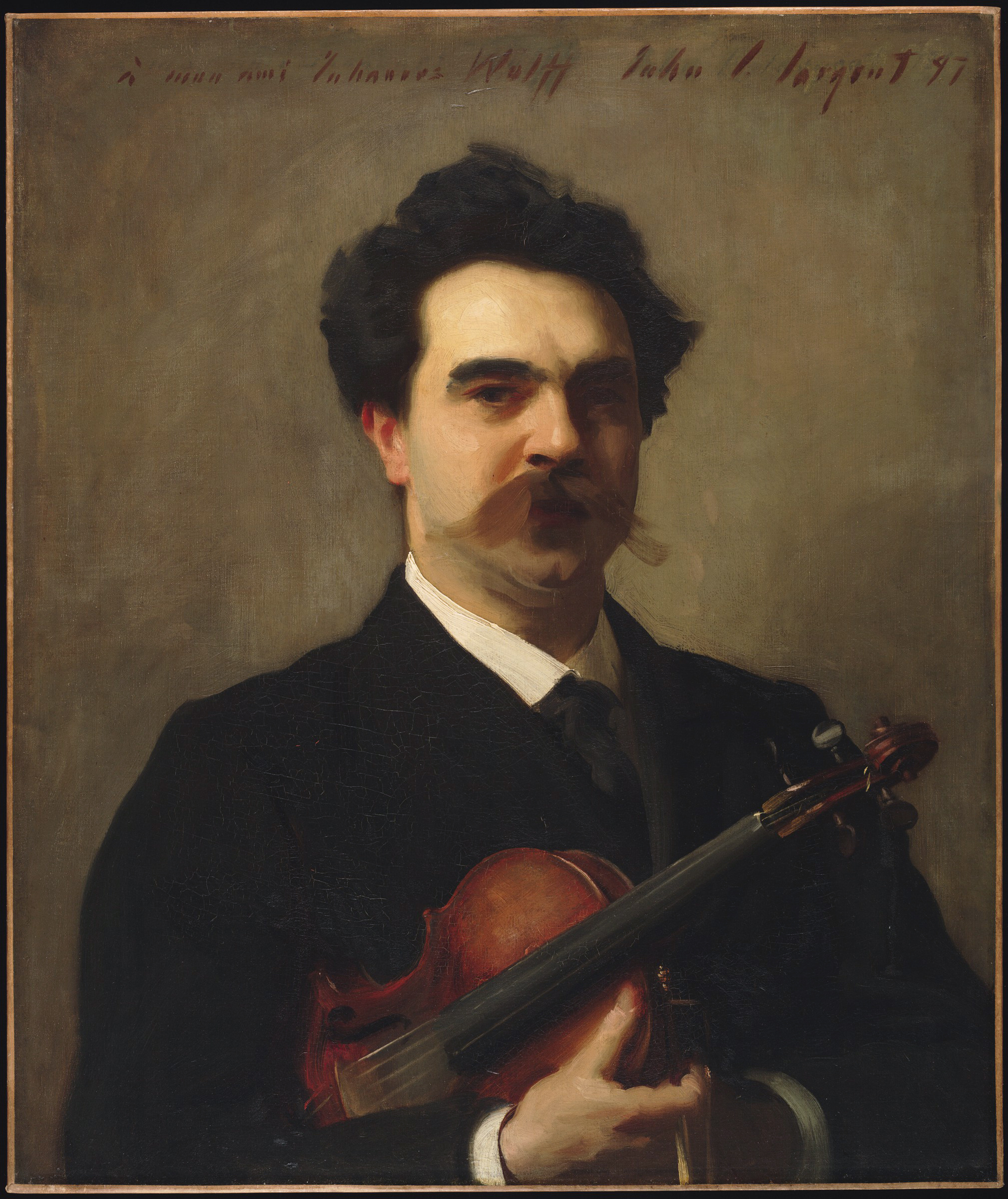
Portrait of Wolff by artist John Singer Sargent

Wolf is viewed as one of the last great universal musicologists of the twentieth century, his published researches and editions ranging from the Middle Ages to the Romantic period. He devoted particular attention to music of the Reformation, the history of music theory and the interpretation of Ars Nova notation. He died in Munich aged 78.

== Selected publications ==
- Geschichte der Mensural-Notation von 1250–1460. Leipzig 1904
- Handbuch der Notationskunde. 2 vol. Leipzig 1913–1919
- Geschichte der Musik in allgemeinverständlicher Form. 3 vol., Leipzig 1925–1929
- Musikalische Schrifttafeln. Bückeburg/Leipzig 1927
