= Wilhelm Fischer (musicologist) =

Austrian musicologist (1886–1962)

Wilhelm Fischer (19 April 1886 – 26 February 1962) was an Austrian musicologist.

== Life ==
Born in Vienna, Fischer studied musicology at the University of Vienna with Guido Adler, as well as geography and history and took private composition lessons with Hermann Graedener. From 1912 to 1928 he was assistant to his former teacher and now patron Adler. After his habilitation with the topic Zur Entwicklungsgeschichte des Wiener klassischen Still (On the Developmental History of Viennese Classical Style) in 1915, he was appointed professor in 1923. In 1928 he took over the chair of musicology at the University of Innsbruck as successor of Rudolf von Ficker.

After the Anschluss, Fischer was forced to retire as a Jew in April 1938. When a "Gauverbot" was imposed on him for Tyrol in 1939, he had to move back to Vienna and was employed in a metal factory as a forced labourer until 1945. Other family members were murdered in The Holocaust, including his sister in the Auschwitz concentration camp. His 85-year-old mother died after the forced evacuation of her apartment in an emergency shelter.

In 1945 Fischer was rehabilitated and appointed director of the Music and Arts University of the City of Vienna until 1948. The same year he was reinstated to his chair in Innsbruck, where he taught as professor from 1951 to 1961.

Fisher died in Innsbruck at the age of 75.

== Literature ==
- Paul Frank, Wilhelm Altmann: Kurzgefasstes Tonkünstler Lexikon. at Gustav Bosse Verlag, Regensburg 1936.
- Paul Nettl: In memoriam Wilhelm Fischer. In Acta Musicologica. 34, 1962, pp. 85–87.
- Rita Egger: Verzeichnis der gedruckten Schriften Wilhelm Fischers. in Die Musikforschung. 15, 1962, pp. 356–358.
- Hanns-Bertold Dietz (2001). "Fischer, Wilhelm". Grove Music Online (8th ed.). Oxford University Press. doi:10.1093/gmo/9781561592630.article.09735. ISBN 978-1-56159-263-0. (subscription, Wikilibrary access, or UK public library membership required)
- Kurt Drexel: Musikwissenschaft und NS-Ideologie dargestellt am Beispiel der Universität Innsbruck von 1938 bis 1945. Publication office of the University of Innsbruck, Innsbruck 1994, ISBN 3-901249-16-8.
- Susanne Blumesberger, Michael Doppelhofer, Gabriele Mauthe: Handbuch österreichischer Autorinnen und Autoren jüdischer Herkunft 18. bis 20. Jahrhundert. Vol. 1: A–I. Published by the Austrian National Library. Saur, Munich 2002, ISBN 3-598-11545-8, p. 2545.
- Elisabeth Th. Hilscher-Fritz: Fischer, Wilhelm. In Oesterreichisches Musiklexikon. Online edition, Vienna 2002 ff., ISBN 3-7001-3077-5; Printed edition: Vol. 1, publishing House of the Austrian Academy of Sciences, Vienna 2002, ISBN 3-7001-3043-0.
