= Erich Schenk =

Austrian music historian

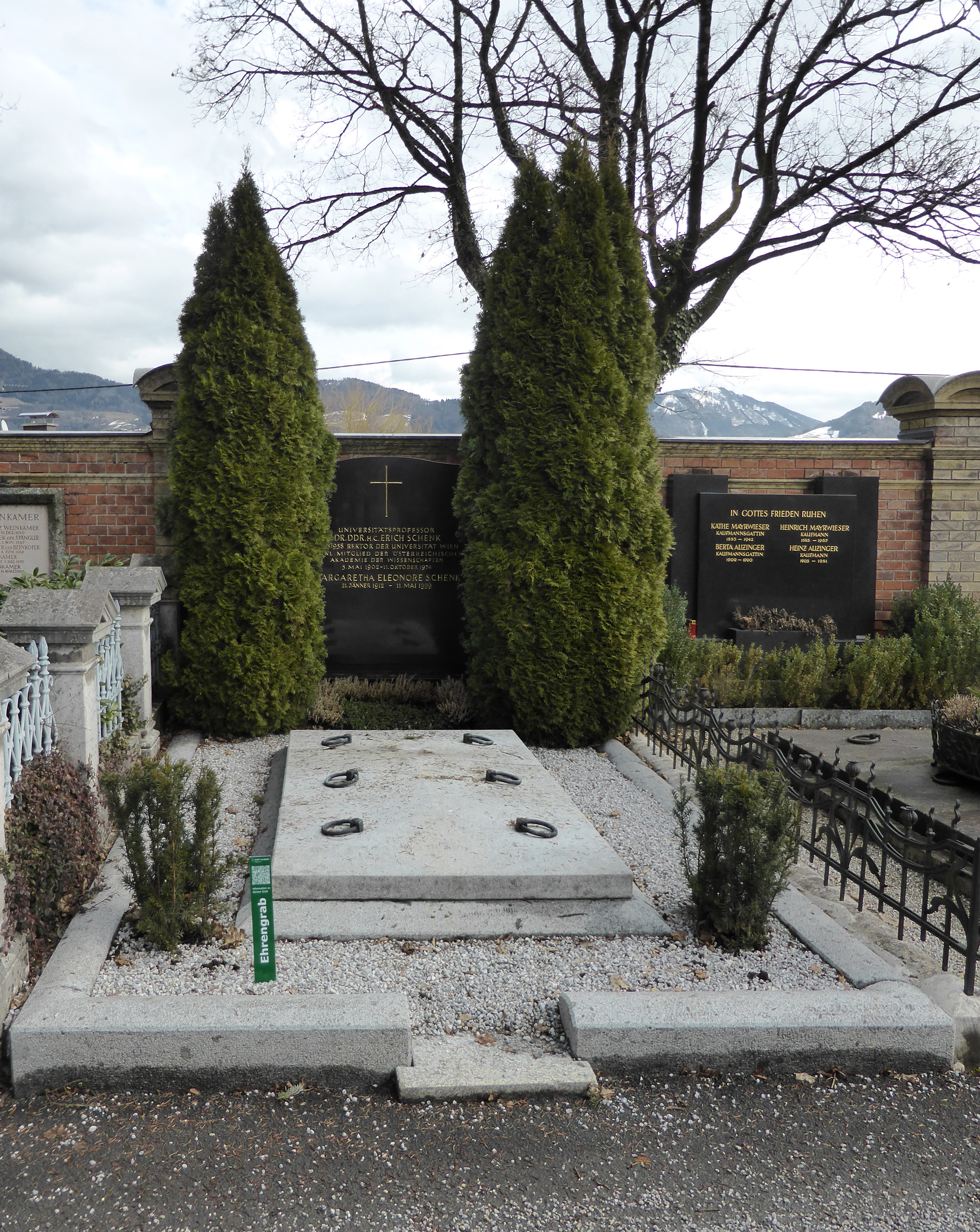
Tomb of Erich and Margaretha Eleonore Schenk at the Salzburger Kommunalfriedhof.

Erich Schenk (5 May 1902 – 11 October 1974) was an Austrian musicologist and music historian.

== Personal and scientific life ==
Born in Salzburg (Austria-Hungary), Schenk studied at the Salzburg Mozarteum and then at the Ludwig-Maximilians-Universität München, where he also received his doctorate in 1925. His habilitation followed in 1930 at the University of Rostock, and four years later he founded the Musicological Institute at that institution in 1934. He remained director of Musicological Institute through 1940.

After the retirement of Robert Lach in 1940, Schenk followed him as full professor at the Institute of Musicology at the University of Vienna. He was able to hold on even after the end of the National Socialist regime and was accepted into the Austrian Academy of Sciences in 1946. In 1950, he was elected Dean of the Faculty of Philosophy and in 1957 he was finally appointed Rector of the University of Vienna.

He gained his reputation as a musicologist as editor of the musicological series Denkmäler der Tonkunst in Österreich (DTÖ) and through his research on Viennese classical music and Baroque music. Schenk received numerous honours for his services to musicological research, including the Decoration of Honour for Services to the Republic of Austria in 1952. He also received honorary doctorate from Masaryk University in Brno and the University of Rostock. In 1966, he received the Wilhelm Hartel Prize, in 1970 the Austrian Decoration of Honour for Science and Art, until he retired in 1971. Since 2003, the Mozart Society of Vienna has been awarding a new prize to young musicians under the name "Erich-Schenk-Preis". This was decreed in her will by the musicologist's widow and replaces the interpretation prize previously awarded by the City of Vienna.

Schenk died in Vienna at age 72. His burial place is at the Salzburger Kommunalfriedhof.

== Anti-Semitism of Erich Schenk ==
It is undisputed that Schenk had a pronounced anti-Semitic attitude from the beginning of the 1930s and did not correct this until his death. This can be proven several times. For example, Schenk, a member of the National Socialist Teachers League then of the National Socialist German Lecturers League, as lecturer and temporary employee for the Amt Rosenberg activities by providing information about former Jewish students of musicology and worked closely with Herbert Gerigk and his Lexikon der Juden in der Musik. Gerigk thanked Schenk warmly: "A close examination of the Viennese doctoral candidates [sic!] would probably reveal some more fat Jews" Schenk had been exempted from military service because of his collaboration in Rosenberg's "Sonderstab Musik" and also contributed to Rosenberg's journal Musik im Kriege.

In the biography of Johann Strauss II, published in 1940, which continues to be of great importance to Strauss research in musicological terms, every single Jew is meticulously identified and research findings on the proven pathologies of Johann Strauss are dismissed by Ernst Décsey (and which are undoubtedly based on the statements of Strauss' third wife Adele) as "autocratic interpretation" and "journalistic eloquence", which did not appear in Strauss's life picture, "[...] until after the World War the Jew Decsey set out to underpin it in terms of local and contemporary history [...]".

=== Donation and expropriation of the Adler Library ===
A particularly inglorious chapter in Schenk's biography is his role in the expropriation of musicologist Guido Adler's private library after his death in 1941, which is presented here in detail because it is stereotypical for the behavior of National Socialist musicologists during National Socialism. For decades, Schenk deceived the public by claiming, in the article he wrote about himself in Die Musik in Geschichte und Gegenwart, that he was the "Library before the access of the Nazi authorities". It was not until 2000, when a manuscript of Gustav Mahler, which was part of the library, was to be auctioned at Sotheby's in Vienna, that the "Causa Schenk-Adler-Bibliothek" was examined more closely.

The librarian Yukiko Sakabe has 2004 and 2007 the state of knowledge is summarized. She speaks of the "confiscation of Guido Adler's library with the participation of university professor Erich Schenk": "Immediately after Guido Adler's death, Schenk began to claim the library and also Adler's scientific estate for himself and for the Institute. Schenk informed the Reich Ministry of Science, Education and National Education in Berlin in a report dated 31 March 1941 about his unauthorized seizure of the library.

The expropriation took place in several steps:

- After Schenk's "unauthorized seizure of the library", the Director General of the National Library Paul Heigl opposes in a letter dated 5 May 1941: "Although I do not wish to ignore the reasons given in your above-mentioned report, I consider a loyal division of the holdings between the Vienna National Library and your institute to be appropriate, especially with regard to the manuscripts, first prints and other unica that may be held in the Library Guido Israel Adler. You therefore wish to consult the Director General of the Vienna National Library about such a division. Signed on behalf of Frey".
- On 6 May and 9 June 1941, a tour of Adler's Library takes place in the presence of two university professors, Leopold Nowak and Robert Haas. Nowak was Schenk's assistant at the time. Haas headed the music collection of the Austrian National Library from 1920 to 1945. Melanie Adler writes: "The visit on Tuesday was forced on me by the lawyer [Richard Heiserer, the one who stole the Mahler manuscript, he was commissioned by Schenk], who in my absence took possession of the key to the library. He threatened to go to the Gestapo to intimidate me and play the matter into the hands of the others." On 9 June 1941, Karl Borufka and Christian Nebehay from the antiquarian bookstore Heck were present as experts. "Some objects were not on their list. For example, the manuscript of Gustav Mahler's song I am lost to the world, another one by Arthur Schnitzler and a death mask by Ludwig van Beethoven. In a report Schenks submitted to the Lower Austrian Financial Directorate after the war, it is stated that some mobile holdings, including the death mask of Beethoven, were lost after a bombing attack on Liebiggasse or after fighting in April 1945 at the Musicological Institute. Hall and Köstner maintain that Schenk would have taken over the death mask before Borufka made his estimate."
- "Shortly after the second viewing Melanie Adler terminated her lawyer Richard Heiserer. Now lawyer Johann Kellner should represent Melanie. Melanie Adler tried to sell her father's library to the Munich City Library. On August 6, 1941 she wrote to Rudolf von Ficker: 'The day before yesterday the lawyer [...] spent a whole morning at the Gestapo. The Gestapo wants the library and the apartment for free'"
- In October 1945, von Ficker wrote in a memorandum on the confiscation of the Adler Library: "During a visit to the musicology seminar on 8 May [1942], I happened to witness how the Adler Library was being unloaded and piled up there, along with all the personal documents and accessories. Prof. Schenk, whom I did not know before, told me for clarification that Ms. Adler had behaved very stupidly, she had violated the law because she had protested against the confiscation of the library by the Gestapo. She had fled, but had already been found by the Gestapo and then it was: "March, to Poland!'" Adler's daughter, Melanie Adler was deported on 20 May 1942 and murdered on 26 May 1942 in the Maly Trostinets extermination camp.
- Several institutes were interested in acquiring the estate: e.g. the National Library and the collections of the Gesellschaft der Musikfreunde in manuscripts and unicums, the Städtische Sammlung der Stadt Wien an der Wiener Musik, the Reichshochschule für Musik from the point of view of increasing its library, the Kulturamt der Stadt Wien (today the library of the Musikschule der Stadt Wien), the Musikwissenschaftliche Institut der Universität Wien, and the Generalreferat für Kunstförderung in the theatre studies holdings for the archive. "On May 12, 1942 the joint inspection and discussion of the division of the collection took place. Schenk justified his claim to Adler's library by saying that Guido Adler had stolen the books during his teaching activities. Approximately three quarters of the available book material was to be considered the property of the Musicological Institute. However, according to the inventory, there was no proof of a claim of ownership by the university."
- In 1943 a part of the books and sheet music from Adler's library was transferred from the Musicological Institute to the various Viennese institutions. Finally, parts of Adler's library had to be ceded to the following institutions by order of the Reichsgau Vienna: Vienna University Library, Library of the University of Music and Performing Arts, Library of the Society of Friends of Music and Music Department of the National Library.
- Later the divided library was returned to Adler's son Hubert-Joachim, who sold it to the University of Georgia.

=== Legal proceedings against Schenk ===
A complaint against Schenk was only filed with the American occupying power after the war. At that time, Section Chief Otto Skrbensky in the Ministry of Education was in charge of the investigation. He denied all charges against Schenk. With regard to the confiscation of Adler's library, he said: "in itself, probably not against Professor Schenk, since it is in the interest of Austria that this library be preserved for our fatherland". The expropriation, as an act of public welfare, seemed to Skrbensky unquestionably an appropriate measure. On 30 June 1952, Federal Minister Ernst Kolb wrote to Schenk: "After a thorough examination of the events at the time, the Federal Ministry recognized these accusations as incorrect and determined your correct behavior when the library was taken over by the musicological institute of the university in the sense of securing your assets".

=== After the Second World War ===
As Gösta Neuwirth In the early sixties, when he began work on Franz Schreker, he was dispatched by the Viennese Ordinary: "I don't associate myself with Jews". A case against Schenk initiated for this purpose was discontinued in 1967 without result.

To the geschichtsklitternden Schenk's conduct also includes the fact that he verifiably corrected and re-coloured his writings written during National Socialism on the occasion of the new edition of his Selected Essays, Speeches and Lectures.

== Publications ==
- Giuseppe Antonio Paganelli. Sein Leben und seine Werke. Nebst Beiträgen zur Musikgeschichte Bayreuths. Dissertation 1925, München. Waldheim-Eberle, Wien 1928.
- Johann Strauss II, in der Reihe Herbert Gerigk (Hg) Unsterbliche Tonkunst, Athenaion, Potsdam 1940.
- Das Ahnenerbe, in W. A. Mozart. Zur Mozart-Woche des Deutschen Reichs in Zusammenarbeit mit dem Reichsministerium für Volksaufklärung und Propaganda und dem Reichsstatthalter in Wien, edited by Walther Thomas, Vienna 1941, pp. 16–22.
- Mozart und der italienische Geist, in Geist der Zeit. Wesen und Gestalt der Völker, Organ des Deutschen Akademischen Austauschdienstes 19 (1941), pp. 580–590.
- Musik in Kärnten, in Schriften zu den Klagenfurter Hochschulwochen, Klagenfurt 1941.
- Organisationsformen deutscher Gemeinschaftsmusik, in Musikverein für Kärnten. Festschrift 1942, Klagenfurt [1942], pp. 58–63.
- 950 Jahre Musik in Österreich. 1946.
- Kleine Wiener Musikgeschichte. Neff, Vienna 1947.
- W. A. Mozart. Amalthea-Verlag, Vienna among others 1955. (Neudruck Piper-Schott, Wien-München 1989. ISBN 3-7957-8268-6)
- Die italienische Trio sonata. Das Musikwerk, Cologne 1955.
- Mozart and His Times
- Ausgewählte Aufsätze, Reden und Vorträge (Wiener musikwissenschaftliche Beiträge 7), Graz 1967.
- Die außeritalienische Triosonate. Das Musikwerk, Cologne 1970.

=== Editions ===
- Franz Aspelmayr: Op. 1/4. Trio per due Violini e Basso continuo. Österreichischer Bundesverlag, Vienna 1954.
- Giovanni Battista Bassani: Op. 5/9. Sonata a tre per due Violini e Basso continuo. Österreichischer Bundesverlag, Vienna 1955/56.
- Heinrich Ignaz Franz Biber: Mensa sonora seu musica instrumentalis, sonatis aliquot liberius sonantibus ad mensam(1680). (Denkmäler der Tonkunst in Österreich 96) Akademische Druck- und Verlagsanstalt, Graz 1960.
- Heinrich Ignaz Franz Biber: Fidicinium sacroprofanum, tam choro, quam foro pluribus fidibus concinnatum et concini aptum (1683). (Denkmäler der Tonkunst in Österreich 97) Akademische Druck- und Verlagsanstalt, Graz 1960.
- Heinrich Ignaz Franz Biber: Sonate tam aris quam aulis servientes (1676). (Denkmäler der Tonkunst in Österreich 106/107) Akademische Druck- und Verlagsanstalt, Graz 1963.
- Tomaso Albinoni: Op. 8/4a. Sonata da chiesa a tre. Per 2 Vl., Vc. e B.c. Doblinger, Wienna and Munich 1975.
