= Hellmut Federhofer =

Hellmut Federhofer (6 August 1911 – 1 May 2014) was an Austrian musicologist. Born in Graz, he studied music there and in Vienna at the University of Music and Performing Arts, Vienna, graduating in 1936. In 1937, he became a librarian at the library of the Technische Hochschule Graz (BTH) and later the Universitätsbibliothek Graz. He became director of the BTH in 1940. In 1959 he became professor of musicology. From 1962 until 1979 he was director of the musicology Institute of Mainz University, where he became Emeritus Professor of musicology.

Federhofer was an honorary member of the Österreichische Gesellschaft für Musikwissenschaft and the Akademie für Mozart-Forschung (founded in 1931 as Zentralinstitut für Mozart-Forschung) In 2001 he received an honorary doctorate from the Philosophy department of the University of Graz. He turned 100 in August 2011. He died in 2014 at the age of 102.
