= Jacobus Vaet =

Flemish composer

Jacobus Vaet (c. 1529 – 8 January 1567) was a Flemish composer of the Renaissance. He was a representative of the generation between Josquin and Palestrina, writing smooth polyphony with pervasive imitation, and he was a friend both of Clemens non Papa and Lassus.

== Life ==
He was born in either Kortrijk or Harelbeke, but about when and where he was born is for now not yet fully determined. From his "Modulationes" (1562) he calls himself "Flemish" but later he says that he is "Belgian", so at least we can say he is from the low countries. His first appearance in the historical record is from Kortrijk, where he was admitted in 1543, at age 13, as a singer to the Onze-Lieve-Vrouwekerk (Church of Our Lady). In 1547 he was enrolled at the University of Leuven, and by 1550 he was in the court of Charles V, where he was listed as tenor in the chapel choir. He may have been recruited for the choir by Pieter Maessens who had been magister cantus at Notre Dame in Courtrai when Vaet was a boy. He became Kapellmeister to Maximilian II in 1554, and held that post for the rest of his life. Evidently Maximilian was fond of his Kapellmeister, and mourned him both in his diary, and by having elegies written for him by other prominent composers in his circle.

== Music and influence ==
Vaet's influences included Nicolas Gombert, whose style of unbroken, smooth polyphony can be seen in most of Vaet's music; his friend Clemens non Papa; and Lassus, whose style he often imitated. Vaet used cross-relations to a degree rare at the time (though they are also significant in the music of Gombert), and they pungently spice contrapuntal passages; sometimes they are even simultaneous, resulting in dissonant clashes: no one would mistake his music for that of Palestrina, for this reason alone. Vaet also sometimes ended compositions on minor triads (for example the motet Postquam consummati essent – ending on a minor chord was very rare between the mid-sixteenth and mid-seventeenth centuries). Another peculiarity of his style was a liking for progressions based on the circle of fifths, as well as dominant-tonic cadences, both features which foreshadow the changes in music which were to come at the end of the century. His use of circle-of-fifths progressions may be an influence from Lassus; it is also a feature of Spanish polyphony of the period, and as a member of the chapel of Charles V, and later Maximilian II, he may have been familiar with the music of Spaniards such as Guerrero, who wrote in a similar idiom and also worked for Maximilian.

Even more unusual than his pungent cross-relations was his liking for quotation and parody. He was the first to write a Missa quodlibetica, a five-voice mass which was a series of quodlibets—simultaneous presentations of several familiar tunes, from both sacred and secular sources. In other compositions he also borrowed sections of pieces by his associates and predecessors, including Josquin, Jean Mouton, Jacquet of Mantua, Clemens non Papa and Cipriano de Rore.

Vaet wrote nine complete masses which have survived, including a setting of the Requiem, one of relatively few from before the mid-16th century. His many surviving motets are both sacred and secular. Furthermore, he wrote eight settings each of the Magnificat and the Marian antiphon Salve Regina; the antiphons were all late works, published in the 1560s. Vaet also wrote a handful of chansons in French, and one setting in German of "Vater unser im Himmelreich".

== Works, editions and selected recordings ==
Extant works

- 10 masses
- 8 magnificats
- 66 motets
- 8 hymns
- 8 Salve Reginas
- 3 chansons

Published collections

- Modulationes quinque vocum 1562, Venice.
- Modulationes quinque et sex vocum 1562, Venice.

== References and further reading ==
- Gustave Reese, Music in the Renaissance. New York, W.W. Norton & Co., 1954. ISBN 0-393-09530-4
- Steinhardt, Milton. L. Macy (ed.). Jacobus Vaet. Grove Music Online. (subscription required)
