= Othmar Wessely =

Austrian musicologist and university teacher

Othmar Wessely (31 October 1922 – 20 April 1998) was an Austrian musicologist.

== Career ==
Born in Linz, Wessely studied musicology at the University of Vienna with Erich Schenk. From 1963 to 1971 he was a university professor at the Karl-Franzens-University of Graz, and from 1972 to 1992 he succeeded his teacher Schenk at the University of Vienna.

From 1974 Wessely was the director of publications of the Denkmäler der Tonkunst in Austria (DTÖ). From 1982 to 1998, he was chairman of the Kommission für Musikforschung of the Austrian Academy of Sciences and scientific director of the Anton Bruckner Institut Linz.

Wessely died in Vienna at age 75. He had been married since 1951 to the musicologist Helene Wessely-Kropik (1924-2011). Both were buried at Döbling Cemetery (group 32, row 4, number 25) (tombstone toppled over).

== Publications ==
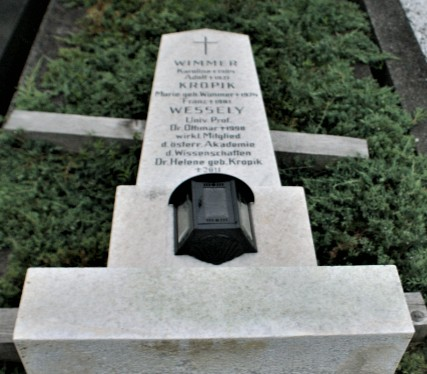
Grave of Othmar Wessely

- Musik in Oberösterreich, Linz 1951.
- Die Musikinstrumentensammlung des Oberösterreichischen Landesmuseums, Linz 1952.
- Johannes Brassicanus, Linz 1948 and 1954.
- Arnold von Bruck, Habilitationsschrift, Vienna 1958 (1961).
- Musik, Darmstadt 1972.
- Bruckner-Studien, Vienna 1975.
- Die älteren Libretti der Bibliothek des Instituts für Musikwissenschaft der Universität Wien, Vienna 1998.
