= Walter Graf (musicologist) =

Austrian musicologist

Walter Graf (June 20, 1903 – April 11, 1982) was an Austrian musicologist.

== Life and career ==
Born in Sankt Pölten, Walter Graf was educated at the University of Vienna where he earned his doctorate in 1933 with a dissertation on German influences on Estonian folksong. At the University of Vienna he studied musicology with professors Robert Lach (who oversaw his dissertation), Guido Adler, Egon Wellesz, and Robert Haas. In addition to studies in musicology, he also pursued studies in anthropology, folklore, philosophy, psychology and phonetics at that institution. In 1952 he was awarded his habilitation at the University of Vienna with a study of the music of the north coast of New Guinea made through an analysis of field recordings made by Rudolf Pöch.

From 1957 to 1963 Graf was the head of the records archive at the Austrian Academy of Sciences. His tenure in that post was a landmark for the archive in several ways. First, Graf more than doubled the size of the collection; acquiring more materials in that five-year period than had been collected by all his predecessors combined between 1899 and 1957. Second, Graf established several new global partnerships with similar archives on the international stage, and helped raise the profile of the Vienna archive by organizing an international conference of archive directors in Vienna. He was elected member of the Austrian Academy of Sciences in 1962, and served as chairman of its 1972 research commission on sound.

While working for the Austrian Academy of Sciences, Graf was also active as a director and vice president of the Gesellschaft zur Herausgabe der Denkmäler der Tonkunst in Österreich (1957–1974). He also taught on the faculty at the University of Vienna where he served first as lecturer (1958–1961), then assistant professor (1962), then associate professor in comparative musicology at the university (1963–1964), and finally professor of musicology (1965–1974).

Graf published several work in comparative musicology based in an anthropological conception of music. He also wrote on the nature of sound and the ways human process and understand sound using the sonagraphic method.

Graf died in Vienna on April 11, 1982, at the age of 78.
