= Akademische Druck- und Verlagsanstalt =

Austrian book publishing company

There also were unrelated publishing houses Akademischer Verlag (Hans-Dieter) Heinz in Stuttgart and Akademischer Verlag in (East-)Berlin, and there is the Jenaer Akademische Verlagsgesellschaft (JAVG).

The Akademische Druck- und Verlagsanstalt (ADEVA) is an Austrian book publisher in Graz that specialises primarily in publishing lavish facsimile editions.

== History ==
The publishing house was founded by Paul Struzl (1914–1973) in Graz. Trained as a typesetter and with a doctorate in economics, Struzl began work in 1947 by acquiring a Rotaprint machine from the province of Styria and founding an offset printing company under the name of his father-in-law Franz Hacker. In 1949, Struzl founded the Akademische Druck- und Verlagsanstalt and brought in the printing works he had established in 1947. Numerous library holdings had been destroyed in World War II, therefore the focus of activity was first on reprinting scholarly works, often in collaboration with the Wissenschaftliche Buchgesellschaft. In the course of the 1960s, the catalogue already contained over a thousand titles, including not only the major German-language bibliographies but also the largest encyclopaedias in German such as Johann Heinrich Zedler's famous Grosses vollständiges Universal-Lexicon Aller Wissenschafften und Künste and the 168-volume Allgemeine Encyclopädie der Wissenschaften und Künste by Johann Samuel Ersch and Johann Gottfried Gruber. In addition to these reprints of old works, new scholarly literature in the fields of philology, historiography, art history, musicology, numismatics, philosophy and theology was published. In addition, the publisher had a pronounced interest in codicology and manuscript books. In cooperation with libraries, mainly in Austria, Italy and the Vatican, the Akademische Druck- und Verlagsanstalt became one of the leading international publishing houses for the production of elaborate facsimile editions. The publisher's best-known book series, entitled Codices Selecti, was begun in 1960.

== Awards ==
The Akademische Druck- und Verlagsanstalt received the Maecenas Art Prize in 1995 for its publishing activities.
