= Guido Adler =

Moravianian-Austrian musicologist and writer (1855–1941)

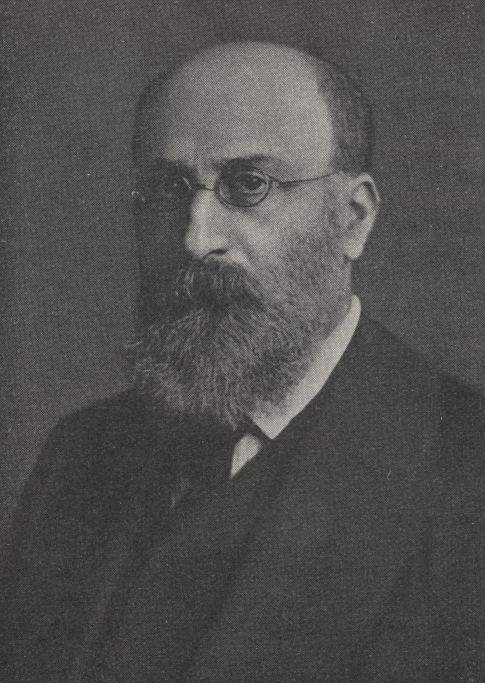
Guido Adler

Guido Adler (1 November 1855 – 15 February 1941) was a Moravian-Austrian musicologist and writer.

== Early life ==
Adler was born at Eibenschütz in Moravia in 1855 of Jewish parentage. He moved with his family to Vienna nine years later. His father Joachim, a physician, died of typhoid fever in 1857. Joachim contracted the illness from a patient, and therefore told his wife Franciska to "never allow any of the children to become a doctor".

Adler studied at the University of Vienna and — at the same time (1868–1874) — the Vienna Conservatory of Music (where he studied piano (main subject) and music theory and composition under Anton Bruckner and Otto Dessoff). He even briefly served at the Vienna Handelsgericht before deciding to pursue his interest in music history. He received an arts diploma from the conservatory in 1874. In 1878, he graduated from University of Vienna as doctor of jurisprudence, and in 1880 as doctor of philosophy. His dissertation, Die Grundklassen der Christlich-Abendländischen Musik bis 1600 (The Chief Divisions of Western Church Music up to 1600), was reprinted in Allgemeine Musikzeitung. Two years later, he completed his accreditation as a university lecturer, also known as Habilitation, with a dissertation on the history of harmony.

== Career ==
In 1883 Adler became lecturer in musicology at University of Vienna, on where he wrote "Eine Studie zur Geschichte der Harmonie" (An Essay on the History of Harmony), published in Sitzungsberichte der Philosophisch-Historischen Klasse der Wiener Academie der Wissenschaften, 1881.

In 1884 he founded (with Friedrich Chrysander and Philipp Spitta) the Vierteljahresschrift für Musikwissenschaft (Musicology Quarterly). Adler provided the first article of the first issue, "Umfang, Methode und Ziel der Musikwissenschaft" ("The Scope, Method, and Aim of Musicology", 1885), the first attempt at a comprehensive description of the study of music. It famously divides the discipline into two subdisciplines, Historische Musikwissenschaft (historical musicology) and Systematische Musikwissenschaft ("systematic musicology"). Systematic musicology included Musikologie or vergleichende Musikwissenschaft (comparative musicology), which later became an independent discipline (cf. ethnomusicology). Although these subfields do not precisely conform to current practice, they are roughly maintained in modern European musicology and roughly correspond to the North American division of musicology into music history (often called "musicology"), music theory, and ethnomusicology.

In 1885 he was called to the newly established German University of Prague, Bohemia, as ordinary professor of the history and theory of music, and in 1898, in the same capacity, to the University of Vienna, where he succeeded Eduard Hanslick and established the Musikwissenschaftliches Institut (Musicological Institute). His students there included composers Anton Webern, Egon Wellesz and Karel Navrátil; conductor Theo Buchwald; violinist Rudolf Kolisch; music editor Felix Greissle; and musicologists Pavao Markovac, Heinrich Jalowetz, and Walter Graf.

In 1886, he published Die Wiederholung und Nachahmung in der Mehrstimmigkeit; in 1888, Ein Satz eines Unbekannten Beethovenischen Klavierkoncerts. In 1892-93 he edited a selection of musical compositions of the Emperors Ferdinand III, Leopold I, and Joseph I. Between 1894 and 1938 he was editor of Denkmäler der Tonkunst in Österreich, a seminal publication in music history.

Adler was the first music historian to emphasize style criticism in research. His attitudes and procedures are evident in the Handbuch der Musikgeschichte (Handbook of Music History), of which he became editor in 1924.

== National Socialist period ==
After the Anschluss in 1938, Adler was forced to resign from his position as editor of Denkmäler der Tonkunst in Österreich. Following his death in Vienna in 1941, his library was taken from his daughter, Melanie Karoline Adler, and subsumed into the collections of the University of Vienna. At the end of World War II, most of the library was returned to his son and is now housed at the University of Georgia while other important items are in the Houghton Library at Harvard University.

== Legacy ==
Adler was one of the founders of musicology as a discipline (Musikwissenschaft). He was also among the first scholars in music to recognize the relevance of sociocultural factors to music (Musiksoziologie), thereby providing a broader context for aesthetic criticism which, with biography, had been the primary focus of 19th century music scholarship. Empirical study was for him the most important part of the discipline. His own emphasis was on the music of Austria, specifically the music of the First Viennese School: Haydn, Mozart and their contemporaries.

== Works ==
- 1911. Der Stil in der Musik. Leipzig: Breitkopf & Härtel.

== See also ==
- Second Viennese School
