= International Piano Competition J. S. Bach, Würzburg =

The International Piano Competition J. S. Bach, Würzburg is a triennial piano competition that is held in Würzburg, Germany. It was founded by Walter Blankenheim, with the inaugural competition being held in 1992. With 825 competitors from 59 countries (as of the 10th competition in 2019), it is the largest Bach piano competition in the world, and the only international Bach piano competition where the repertoire consists of only the works of J. S. Bach.

The competition is open to pianists of all nationalities who are not older than 36 at the time of the competition. The program consists exclusively of the original keyboard works of J. S. Bach. The competition aims to encourage competitors to demonstrate stylistically well-developed Bach interpretations on the piano, study Bach’s works, and to encounter different interpretations of those works.

Walter Blankenheim was the director of the competition for the first 5 editions (1992, 1995, 1998, 2001, and 2004). The competition was held at the Hochschule für Musik Saar in Saarbrücken, where Blankenheim was a professor of piano. After Blankenheim's death in 2007, Inge Rosar succeeded him as the director of the competition and moved the competition to Würzburg (where she is a professor of piano at the Hochschule für Musik Würzburg) for the 6th edition of the competition that same year, where it has remained ever since. Traditionally, the competition is held between March 11 and March 21, culminating in the awards ceremony and final concert of the prizewinners on March 21 (J. S. Bach's birthday). The preliminary, quarter-final, and the semi-final rounds are typically held in the Hochschule für Musik Würzburg, while the final round is played at the theater on the Bibrastrasse in Würzburg. Due to the COVID-19 pandemic, the 11th competition, originally scheduled for 2022, was held online from September 2021 to March 2022.

== Structure ==
The competition consists of four stages or rounds. All works are to be performed by memory and with all repeats (the only exceptions are the repeats of the Goldberg Variations, and repeats in the preludes of the Well-Tempered Clavier). The program is as follows:

Preliminary Round: One French Suite BWV 812–817 + one other obligatory work. These works differ with each competition, but have included Toccatas BWV 910–916, Fantasias, Aria variata alla maniera italiana in A minor BWV 989, and the three-part Ricercar from The Musical Offering.

Quarter-final Round: One English Suite BWV 806–811 or one Partita BWV 825-830 (alternates each competition) + Preludes and Fugues from The Well-Tempered Clavier

Semi-final Round: The program for the semi-final round varies, with a duration between a minimum of 30 minutes to maximum of 40 minutes (with the only exception being the Goldberg Variations):

One Partita or one English Suite (alternates each competition) + one or more original works by J. S. Bach chosen by the performer; or the French Overture B minor BWV 831 + one or more original works by J. S. Bach chosen by the performer; or the Goldberg Variations BWV 988 (without repeats); or a set of Preludes and Fugues from the Well-Tempered Clavier (excluding those of the quarter-final round)

Final Round: One of the four Keyboard Concertos BWV 1053-1056

Typically, there are 40 pianists who participate in the preliminary round, 16 who advance to the quarter-final round, 8 who advance to the semi-final round, and 4 who advance to the final round.

== Honorary Committee and Jury ==
The Honorary Committee consists of a number of notable musicians, including: Julius Berger, Dr. Kurt Bohr, Aldo Ciccolini, Ekaterina Dershavina, Karl Engel, Bernd Glemser, Adam Harasiewicz, Dr. Ryuichi Higuchi, Ulf Hoelscher, Dr. Klaus Hofmann, Zoltán Kocsis, Emanuel Krivine, Robert Leonardy, Jean Micault, Siegmund Nimsgern, Vera Nossina, Gerhard Oppitz, Siegfried Palm, Günter Philipp, Dr. Helmuth Rilling, Klaus Schilde, H.-P. und V. Stenzl, Fanny Waterman, Bruno Weil, Dr. Markus Brändle.

Members of the jury have included Prof. Walter Blankenheim, Prof. Inge Rosar, Prof. Arne Torger, Vera Nosina, Amadeus Webersinke, Monique Duphil. Several former prize-winners have since been invited into the jury, including Chih-Yu Chen and Andrea Padova.

== Prize winners ==
The competition allows for a number of finalists. However, only four prizes are awarded. Prizes may be shared without diminishing the monetary award to each contestant. Diplomas and special prizes for best interpretation are also awarded. A number pianists that have won prizes in this competition have gone on to have international careers as performers or educators, such as Andrea Padova, Christopher Hinterhuber, Gerold Huber, Gianluca Luisi, Maria Perrotta, Esther Birringer, and Hilda Huang, who is currently the only pianist that has received top prizes in all Bach competitions (Leipzig 2014, Würzburg 2010, and Tureck 2010).

Prize-winners of the International Piano Competition “Johann Sebastian Bach” Würzburg / Germany
Year	1st	2nd	3rd	4th	Diplomas	Special Prizes and Acknowledgements
1992	(Russia) Ekaterina Dershavina	(Austria) Nana Mamaeva	(Russia) Nataliya Kislenko and (Belarus) Elena Metelskaya	(Italy) Andrea Padova and (Latvia) Kalvis Jordans	not awarded	not awarded
1995	(Italy) Andrea Padova	(Russia) Nataliya Kislenko	(Germany) Andreas Woyke and (Russia) Anton Boldyrev	not awarded	(Uzbekistan) Julia Schirinova	(Russia) Marina Ivanova and (Russia) Mariya Massycheva
1998	not awarded	(Germany) Yorck Kronenberg	(Russia) Inga Kazanteva	(Germany) Marrett Popp and (Austria) Christopher Hinterhuber	(Russia) Marina Ivanova	(Russia) Ludmilla Hallaeva and (Germany) Thomas Walczak
2001	(Italy) Gianluca Luisi	(Japan) Keiko Ishitobi and (Russia) Maria K.-Westerman	(Russia) Marina Ivanova and (Germany) Gerold Huber	(Japan) Eri Nakamura	(Taiwan) Chih-Yu Chen and (Estonia) Ave Kruup	(Spain) Jorge García Herranz and (South Korea) Young-Sook Cho and (Germany) Natalia Kaiser and (Japan) Naoya Seino
2004	(Taiwan) Chih-Yu Chen	not awarded	(Italy) Maria Perrotta	not awarded	(Germany) Esther Birringer and (South Korea) Myoung-Joon Cho and (South Korea) Eun-Jung Kim and (South Korea) Se hwa Yoon	(Ukraine) Oleksandra Pershyna and (Germany) Anne Salie and (Spain) Jorge Garcia Herranz and (Hungary) Adam Szvoren
2007	(Germany) Esther Birringer	(Japan) Yukiko Nakai	(Ukraine) Kirill Zwegintsow	(Japan) Rie Kawata	(Russia) Sholpan Barlykova and (Italy) Rosamaria Bene and (Germany) Andreas Hecker	(Germany) Olga Witthauer
2010	not awarded	not awarded	(United States) Hilda Huang	(Hungary) Ágnes Juhász and (Italy) Rosamaria Bene	(Australia) Kirill Monorosi and (Russia) Elizaveta Ivanova	not awarded
2013	not awarded	(Netherlands) Daniel van der Hoeven	(Italy) Rosamaria Bene	(Japan) Ai Kayukawa and (Japan) Naoya Fujiwara	not awarded	(United States) Victoria Young
2016	not awarded	(Poland) Maciej Słapiński	not awarded	(Netherlands) Laurens de Man	(Sweden) Max Nyberg and (Bulgaria) Georgi Boykin	(Poland) Maciej Słapiński and (Sweden) Max Nyberg and (South Korea) Daae JEON
2019	not awarded	not awarded	(Italy) Mattia Fusi	(Russia) Alexander Koryakin	(Japan) Iuchi Saori and (Poland) Joanna Krauze	(Italy) Mattia Fusi and (Russia) Alexander Koryakin and (Poland) Joanna Krauze and (Bulgaria) Georgi Boykin and (Germany) Philipp Adrian Voepel and (United States) Victoria Frances Young and (Russia) / (Germany) Sergey Korolev
2021-2022 (online)	(Australia) Hongyi Sophia Cai	(France) Julien Cohen	(Japan) Mai Higuchi	not awarded	(United States) Chung Hon Michael Cheng and (Japan) Shion Ota	not awarded
