= El Decameron Negro =

El Decameron Negro may refer to:

- El Decamerón Negro, a 1981 solo guitar work by Leo Brouwer
- El Decameron Negro, a 1997 album by Michael Tröster
- Latin American Guitar Music 'El Decameron Negro', a 1993 album by Evangelos & Liza

== See also ==
- The Black Decameron (Italian: Il decamerone nero), a 1972 Italian costume drama comedy film
