= Vincent Dubois =

Vincent Dubois may refer to:

- Vincent Dubois (organist) (born 1980), French organist
- Vincent Dubois (politician) (born 1981), French Polynesian politician and lawyer
