= Margaret Brouwer =

American composer

Margaret Brouwer (born February 8, 1940, in Ann Arbor, Michigan) is an American composer and composition teacher. She founded the Blue Streak Ensemble chamber music group.

== Biography ==
Brouwer studied at Oberlin College, graduating in 1962, and received her master's degree from Michigan State University. Having started her musical career as a professional violinist with the Fort Worth Symphony and Dallas Symphony, she went on to earn her DMA in composition from Indiana University. Her teachers have included Donald Erb, Harvey Sollberger, Frederick A. Fox, and George Crumb. From 1996 to 2008 Brouwer served as head of the composition department and holder of the Vincent K. and Edith H. Smith Chair in Composition at the Cleveland Institute of Music. She is now professor emeritus at CIM.

Brouwer was in residence at the Wellesley Composers Conference in 2002 and at the MacDowell Colony in 2001, and was a Norton Stevens Fellow there in 1999. She served as Composer-in-Residence at Indiana University in 2004.

In 2004 Brouwer was named a Guggenheim Fellow. In 2006, she received an American Academy of Arts and Letters award in music. In 2010 she received a Meet The Composer Commissioning/USA award to compose Path at Sunrise, Masses of Flowers which was premiered by the Cleveland Women's Symphony. In 1999 she received the Cleveland Arts Prize.

In 2011, Brouwer founded Blue Streak Ensemble, a mixed chamber group devoted to performing her work and the works of other living composers, alongside arrangements of core repertoire. With Blue Streak Ensemble, Brouwer launched the 'Music by the Lake' series, with summer performances around the northern Ohio Lake Erie region. Brouwer's Violin Concerto was performed by Michi Wiancko with both the South Carolina Philharmonic and Columbus Georgia Symphonies.

Her students have included composers Peter Gilbert and Joseph Hallman.

== Performances ==
Ensembles in New York, Seattle, San Francisco, Washington, D.C., Boston, and Cleveland have programmed her works. In New York, Brouwer's music has been programmed by the Chamber Music Society of Lincoln Center, American Composers’ Orchestra at Carnegie Hall, Merkin Hall, the Cutting Room, and Symphony Space; by the Orchestra of St. Luke's on its “Second Helping” series; and by the Cassatt and Cavani String Quartets. In Washington, D.C. her music has been performed at the Kennedy Center, the Concoran Gallery, and the Phillips Gallery.

Formerly published by Carl Fischer and Theodore Presser, Brouwer's music is now available through Brouwer New Music Publishing.

=== 1999–2004 ===
In June 2001 the Cleveland Museum of Art presented a concert devoted entirely to Brouwer's chamber music, in which two of the four works performed, (Light and Under the Summer Tree) were premieres. Other premieres during the 2001–02 season included Mandala for the Cleveland Chamber Symphony and Quartet for Franklin Cohen, principal clarinet of the Cleveland Orchestra. Brouwer's Diary of an Alien and Skyriding were heard in Washington, D.C., in a Prelude Concert of the National Symphony Orchestra in June, 2001. Other performances included Demeter Prelude by the Cavani String Quartet, Crosswinds by the Aurora String Quartet on San Francisco's Composers, Inc. concert series, “Horn Sonata” with Richard King, principal hornist with the Cleveland Orchestra, Quartet at the Composers Conference at Wellesley College in Massachusetts, and Diary of an Alien at the National Flute Association Convention in Washington, D.C. Brouwer's SIZZLE was premiered by the Women's Philharmonic of San Francisco in September 2000 in a concert which also included her Symphony No. 1.

The 2002–03 season saw the November 2002 premiere of Brouwer's Concerto for Percussion, Aurolucent Circles, by Evelyn Glennie and the Seattle Symphony conducted by Gerard Schwarz. In the words of the Seattle Post-Intelligencer: “(Brouwer) has written a marvelous display piece… music (that is) effective and solid, often rather atmospheric, and gives the percussion soloist many opportunities.” In September 2002, the Cleveland Public Theater and Ursuline College presented Brouwer's Mystical Connections, a 75-minute work which incorporates musicians and music from other cultures. Brouwer was selected to compose the Ohio Bicentennial commissioned work premiered by the ProMusica Chamber Orchestra in February, 2003. In April, 2003 the Roanoke Symphony premiered Pulse, for which Brouwer received a grant from the National Endowment for the Arts. In January, New York City's Steinway Hall presented an evening of her chamber music including Quartet, Winter’s Dream, Under the Summer Tree and Demeter Prelude.

=== 2005–2009 ===
Brouwer's Light for Soprano, harpsichord, flute, clarinet, violin, cello, and percussion was performed at the Tanglewood Music Center's 2005 Festival of Contemporary Music. Reviewing this concert Allan Kozinn wrote in the New York Times, “Margaret Brouwer’s fantastically eclectic “Light” filtered fragments of medieval and Renaissance pieces through a prism of free-ranging melody.” Brouwer was awarded an Ohio Council for the Arts Individual Fellowship for 2005.

In January 2006, Naxos released a CD of her orchestral entitled Aurolucent Circles (CD # 8.559250) featuring Evelyn Glennie, solo percussionist and The Royal Liverpool Philharmonic Orchestra with Gerard Schwarz conducting. Skyriding was performed at the Contemporary Music Forum in Washington, D.C., in February 2005.

In 2007, violinist Michi Wiancko and conductor James Gaffigan premiered Brouwer’s Concerto for Violin and Chamber Orchestra with CityMusic Cleveland Chamber Orchestra. In reviewing this work, Donald Rosenberg wrote about its “surprising tension between skittish and poetic material... the violinist has long, bravura statements that melt seamlessly into tender utterances and back again.”

In 2009, premieres included Brouwer's Rhapsody for Orchestra commissioned and premiered by the Detroit Symphony, Leonard Slatkin, conducting, and BREAKDOWN, a collaborative work by Brouwer and video/sound artist Kasumi, commissioned and premiered by the American Composers Orchestra, George Manahan conducting, at Carnegie's Zankel Hall.

=== 2010- ===
Brouwer's Concerto for Viola and Orchestra, commissioned by the Dallas Symphony, was premiered in January 2010. A 2010 Voices of Change concert in Dallas featured several of Brouwer's works including Trio, Skyriding, and Diary of an Alien. Her first children's symphonic drama, Daniel and Snakeman, was premiered by CityMusic Cleveland in May 2011.

The Rochester Philharmonic Orchestra, Arild Remmereit conducting, premiered Brouwer's new orchestral work which they commissioned, Caution Ahead – Guard Rail Out, in May 2012. Brouwer was one of five American women composers to be commissioned by American Piano Awards to write a work for solo piano. Her composition Prelude and Toccata premiered in Indianapolis on April 15, 2013, by Eric Zuber, for the APA's 2013 ProLiance Energy Classical Fellowship Awards. On April 18 and 19, 2013 the Rochester Philharmonic Orchestra performed Brouwer's Remembrances. Violinist Michi Wiancko, conductor Gary Schneider and the Orchestra for the Next Century gave the east coast premiere of Margaret Brouwer's highly acclaimed Violin Concerto at Merkin Hall in New York.

== Style ==
Brouwer's music has been noted for its use of imagery, memorable melodies, and accessible and engaging nature while making "no obvious concessions toward styles of the day." In the words of Sarah Bryan Miller of the St. Louis Post Dispatch, Brouwer is "accessible and engaging for a wide range of audiences... not afraid to be spiky when spikiness is indicated, but there’s never a sense in any of these works that she’s using atonality for its own sake.” Furthermore, Brouwer's music has been noted for having "a keen balance between contemporary and tonal language." Fanfare magazine described Brouwer's music as having "a sense of stylistic independence and an openness of spirit.

== Recordings ==
Title	Year	Label	Catalog No.	Notes
Shattered: Chamber Music of Margaret Brouwer	2014	Naxos Records	8.559763	Shattered Glass, Clarinet Quintet, Whom do you call angel now?, Lonely Lake, Arrangements of Clair de lune and Bach's 2-part Invention in F-Major
The Verdehr Trio - American Images 5 (Making of a Medium Vol. 20)	2011	Crystal Records	CD 970	Contains performance of Trio
CityMusic Cleveland LIVE	2007	CityMusic Cleveland	CMC4, 2007	Contains performance of Violin Concerto
Aurolucent Circles	2006	Naxos Records	8.559250	Aurolucent Circles, Mandala, Pulse, Remembrances, SIZZLE
Margaret Brouwer - Light	2003	New World Records	80606	Lament, Light, Under the Summer Tree, Skyriding, Demeter Prelude
Crosswinds	1999	New World Records	NWCR821	Crosswinds, Prelude and Vivace, Diary of an Alien, Sonata for Horn and Piano
New Mexico Brass Quintet	1993	Crystal Records	CD563	Contains Performance of Timespan
Works by Allan Blank and Margaret Brouwer	1993	Centaur Records	CRC 2138	Skyriding, SCHerZOid, Two Pieces for Viola

== Works ==
=== Chamber music ===
- Inner Voices (2014) - flute, voice, violin, cello, trombone, piano
- Rhapsodic Sonata for Viola and Piano (2012)
- Lonely Lake (2011) - Flute (Piccolo), Clarinet (Bass Clarinet), Violin, Cello, Percussion and Piano
- Shattered Glass (2007) - Flute, Cello, Percussion, Piano
- Fling (2006) - String Quartet
- Trio (2005) - Violin, Clarinet, Piano
- Quintet for Clarinet in A and String Quartet (2005) - Clarinet, 2 violins, viola, cello
- Declaration (2005) - Soprano or mezzo-soprano, violin, piano
- Clarinet Quintet (2005)
- Lament (2002) - Violin, clarinet, bassoon, percussion
- Wedding Song (2001) - String Quartet
- Light (2001) - Soprano, harpsichord, flute, clarinet, violin, cello, percussion
- Rapunzel (1998) - Soprano, Flute, Bassoon, French Horn, Trombone, Percussion, Narrator/Synthesizer
- Celebration (1998) - Brass Quintet
- Demeter Prelude (1997) - String Quartet
- Sonata for Horn and Piano (1996)
- A Little Renaissance Music - Violin, oboe, clarinet, cello, double bass
- Crosswinds (1995) - String quartet
- Tolling the Spirits (1994) - Brass Quintet: 2 trumpets (doubling fluegelhorns), Horn, Trombone, Tuba
- Chamber Concerto (1993) - Solo clarinet, Percussion, Piano
- Skyriding (1992) - Flute, Violin, Cello, Piano
- Two Songs (1990) - Soprano, flute, violin, cello, tuba or trombone, percussion, piano
- Two Pieces for Viola (1989) - Viola and Piano
- Sonata for Violin and Piano (1987)
- Timespan (1986) - Brass Quintet - 2 trumpets (doubling Fluegelhorns), Horn, Trombone, Tuba
- Aurolucent Echoes (1985) - Solo Harp; Echo Harp, 2 Percussion, Violin, Viola, Cello
- Dream Drifts (1983) - Viola (with tape delay) and Piano (with Percussion)
- Ruins of Riveaulx (1982) - Electronic tape with optional visuals

=== Chamber orchestra ===
- Daniel and Snakeman (2011) - A Children's Symphonic Drama for Narrator and Chamber Orchestra
- Century's Song (2003) - Version available for community and high school orchestra
- Wedding Song (2001) - String Orchestra
- Mandala (2001)
- Prelude and Vivace for Clarinet and Chamber Ensemble (1996)
- Then the Bells (1991)
- Skattle (1990)

=== Orchestral ===
- Caution Ahead - Guard Rail Out (2012)
- Path at Sunrise, Masses of Flowers (2010)
- Rhapsody for Orchestra (2009)
- Breakdown (2009) - A sample based hybrid opera in one act
- Stardance (2007)
- Pulse (2003)
- Centennial Bells (2003) - From Century's Song. Easy arrangement for middle school and high school orchestras
- Sizzle (2000)
- Symphony No. 1, Lake Voices (1997)
- Pluto - A Sequel (1997) - Orchestra and Women's Chorus
- Remembrances (1996)
- Third From the Sun (1988)

==== Concerti ====
- Concerto for Viola and Orchestra (2010)
- Concerto for Violin and Orchestra (2007)
- Aurolucent Circles (2002) - Concerto for Percussion and Orchestra
- Concerto for Clarinet and Orchestra (1994)

=== Solo Instrumental ===
==== Piano ====
- Prelude and Toccata (2013)
- Under the Summer Tree (2000)
- Sonata for Solo Piano (1998)
- Dancing on Hot Coals (1998)

==== Other ====
- No Rotary Phone (1995) - Clarinet
- Diary of an Alien (1994) - Flute
- SCHerZOid (1989) - Horn

=== Vocal ===
- Sing with the Lark (2003) - SATB, a cappella, optional piano, optional handbells. Also available with chamber or orchestra accompaniment.
- Winter Dream (2000) - Soprano and piano
- Missa Brevis (1991) - Men's chorus and piano (3 Chimes or Hand Bells, played by chorus members)
- Washington and Lee Hymn (1990) - SATB a cappella

=== Band and Wind Ensemble ===
- Pulse (2013)
- Red Hill Special March (2003)
- Sizzle (2002) - Wind Ensemble, college, and high school bands

=== Arrangements ===
- Bach - Two Part Invention in F Major (BWV 779) - arranged for Flute, Clarinet, Violin, Cello, Piano and Percussion
- Debussy - Clair de Lune - arranged for Flute, Clarinet, Violin, Cello and Piano
