= Manuel Gera =

German church musician and organist

- Born: 1963 (age 62–63); Germany
- Genres: Church music, classical
- Occupations: Church musician, organist, choirmaster
- Instrument: Organ
- Years active: 1991–present
- Spouse: Anne-Katrin Gera
- Award: Festival Europäische Kirchenmusik 3rd prize (1995)

Manuel Gera (born 1963) is a German church musician and organist.

Gera studied Protestant church music at the Robert Schumann Hochschule Düsseldorf. There, he passed the A-Examen (Kirchenmusik) in 1991. His teachers included Hartmut Schmidt (choir conducting), Hans-Dieter Möller (organ) and Gustav Adolf Krieg (organ improvisation). After postgraduate studies at the Hochschule für Musik Saar with Daniel Roth and Theo Brandmüller, he completed the Konzertexamen in 1995 in the subject organ improvisation. Also in 1995, he was awarded third prize at the Festival Europäische Kirchenmusik in Schwäbisch Gmünd.

After working as a cantor in Oberhausen and Soest, he was appointed to St. Michael's Church, Hamburg in 2001. There, he served as organist and choirmaster until 2021. In 2006, he was appointed church music director by the church leadership of North Elbian Evangelical Lutheran Church. On 1 May 2021, he took up the post of district cantor in Jüterbog south of Berlin.

The main focus of his activity is organ improvisation. Together with his wife Anne-Katrin, he conceives organ concerts for children.

== Compositions ==
- Credo novum (2005)
- Engel-Triptychon (2006)
- Missa de Angelis (2007)
