= Gerd Boder =

German composer

Gerd Boder (13 June 1933, Saarbrücken – 2 June 1992) was a German composer. He studied music at the Hochschule für Musik Saar, the Conservatoire à rayonnement régional de Poitiers, and the Conservatoire de Paris. Among his teachers were Heinrich Konietzny, Jean Rivier, and Noël Gallon. He won the Stuttgart Award for Young Composers in 1963 and 1968, was awarded the Prix de Composition Prince Pierre de Monaco in 1963, and received the Kunstpreis des Saarlandes, the most important cultural prize of this German federal state, in 1976.

== Sources ==
- Kreutzer, Tomas: Ein Hoffnungsträger - Leben und Werk des Komponisten Gerd Boder. in: Musik in Saarbrücken - Nachklänge einer wechselvollen Geschichte (Im Auftr. des Saarländischen Rundfunks, SR 2 <Kulturradio>). Hrsg.: Nike Keisinger, Ricarda Wackers. Saarbrücken: 2000. pg. 207–210
- Lücke, Martin: Gerd Boder: Leben und Werk, hrsg. von der Stadt Soest, Soest 2003
