= Frederick A. Fox =

American classical composer (1931–2011)

- Born: January 17, 1931
- Died: August 24, 2011 (aged 80)
- Occupations: Composer of Classical Music; Professor of Composition, Jacobs School of Music, Indiana University
- Writing career
- Genre: Contemporary

Frederick A. Fox (January 17, 1931 – August 24, 2011) was an American composer and former music educator specializing in contemporary classical music.

== Early years ==
Frederick Alfred Fox Jr. was born January 17, 1931, in Detroit, Michigan. His early musical training in his native Detroit encompassed the saxophone (with Laurence "Larry" Teal) and music theory and arranging (with Ray McConnell). He subsequently studied composition with Ruth Shaw Wylie and received the B.Mus. degree from Wayne State University in 1953. He worked for a year with Ross Lee Finney at the University of Michigan, but took a leave from his studies to tour as a jazz saxophonist (tenor and baritone), a career he gave up in 1956–57 to return to serious composing. Fox then went to Indiana University School of Music (now the Jacobs School of Music) in Bloomington, where he studied composition with Bernhard Heiden, and from which he was graduated with the Masters of Music (1957) and Doctor of Music (1959).

== Composer, teacher ==
After serving in various faculty and foundation posts in the United States, Fox returned to the Indiana University School of Music in 1974 as professor of composition. One of his first undertakings was the founding of the Indiana University New Music Ensemble in 1975–76, with himself as its first director. During his leadership tenure, the New Music Ensemble began to take its place as one of the foremost university ensembles of its kind in the country; it has since toured to cities such as Chicago, Washington, D.C., San Francisco, New York City, among others. Fox was appointed chair of the Indiana University School of Music composition department in 1981, and lead that department for 13 years, a period during which it gained increasing recognition and became one of the highest-ranked programs in the United States.

Notable students of Fox include: James Aikman, Margaret Brouwer, David Dzubay, Keith Fitch, Jeffrey Hass, Jeeyoung Kim, Robert Paterson, Mark Phillips, and Stephen Suber.

== Compositions ==
With more than 55 published compositions in various media, Fox's catalog ranges from solo instrumental and choral pieces to large-scale works for orchestra; a good number of them are commercially recorded.

Like many young American composers in the 1950s and 1960s, Fox had some experience as a jazz performer and arranger before he took up composing. His music grows principally out of this background, experience, and interest in jazz, in addition to serial techniques, and some informal systematic formations which tend to possess qualities of improvisation. Though he found serialism to be essentially at odds with his creative outlook, his jazz background was to find its echo in several of his characteristic works.

== Selected works ==
=== Orchestra ===
- Impressions (1995)
- Echo Blues (1992)
- In the Elsewhere (1988)
- Now and Then (1988) [Chamber Orchestra]
- Januaries (1984)
- Night Ceremonies (1979)

=== String orchestra ===
- Nightscenes (1988); string orchestra, harp, piano/celeste, percussion (5)

=== Symphonic band ===
- Four Times Round (1996)
- Polarities (1987)

=== Ensemble/chamber ===
- Blind Time (1996) – orchestra brass, percussion (2)
- Dreamcatcher (1994) – flute, oboe, clarinet, horn, trumpet, trombone, violin, viola, cello, double bass, piano, percussion (2)
- Time Weaving (1993) – clarinet trio (Eb, Bb, Bass Cl)
- Devil's Tramping Ground (1991) – flute, oboe, clarinet, violin, cello, piano, percussion (1)
- The Avenging Spirit (1989) – saxophone quartet
- Auras (1988) – flute, clarinet, cello, piano, percussion (1)
- Time Messages (1988) – brass quintet
- Shaking the Pumpkin (1986) – saxophone, piano, percussion (2)
- 3 Diversions (1987) – saxophone quartet
- Vis-A-Vis (1985) – horn and string quartet
- Dawnen Grey (1984) – string quartet
- Sonaspheres 5 (1983) – flute/alto flute, fl/picc, clarinet, trumpet, trombone, violin, viola, cello, piano, percussion (2)
- Bren (1982) – brass ensemble
- Sonaspheres 1 (1980) – flute/alto, flute/picc, clarinet, trumpet, trombone, violin, viola, cello, piano, percussion (2)
- S.A.X. (1979) – solo alto saxophone, saxophone quartet;
- Ambient Shadows (1978) – flute/alto, clarinet, trombone, violin, viola, cello, piano, percussion (1)

=== Choral/voice ===
- Time Excursions (1976) – soprano, speaker, flute, clarinet, violin, cello, piano, percussion (2)
- The Descent (1969) – SATB, piano, percussion (2)

=== Solo ===
- When the Thunder Speaks (1998) – alto saxophone and piano;
- Five Mementos for Trumpet & Piano (1995) – trumpet and piano;
- Kokopelli (1994) – flute and piano;
- Fantasy (1993) – viola and piano;
- Echos and Shadows (1993) – violin and piano;
- Hear Again in Memory (1991) – saxophone;
- Annexus (1980) – alto saxophone and piano

== Selected discography ==
- The Music of Frederick Fox, Indiana University School of Music, 1992.
- The Music of Frederick Fox, Volume 2, Indiana University School of Music, 2000.
- New Music from Indiana University – Volume 2, Indiana University School of Music, 1998.
- Thomas Walsh. Shaking the Pumpkin. RIAX, Inc., 1998.
- Zagreb Saxophone Quartet with Eugene Rousseau. Tsunagari, Zagrebačka banka, 2002.
- Trio Indiana, Crystal Records, Inc., 1996.
- Michael Jacobson, saxophone. Mixed Company, Equilibrium, 2000.
