= Martin Galling =

German pianist and harpsichordist

Martin Galling (born 1935 in Halle (Saale)) is a German pianist, harpsichordist and chamber musician.

Galling first took cello lessons and studied the piano from 1945 at the Peter Cornelius Conservatory of Mainz with Louise Wandel. He studied at the Hochschule für Musik Mainz, counterpoint with Günter Raphael, and chamber music and musicology with Günter Kehr. In 1956 he was in the master class of Hans Leygraf, followed by concerts in Germany and tours of Western Europe, the U.S., Israel and Japan. Galling was a soloist on numerous tours of the Stuttgart Chamber Orchestra under Karl Münchinger, and collaborated with Helmuth Rilling. From 1970 to 2000 he was a professor of chamber music at the Hochschule für Musik Saar (Music Academy of the Saarland). In 2003 he founded the piano duo Galling-Olivieri.

Galling recorded the complete harpsichord music of Bach for a series of six three-LP sets released on the Vox label (repackaged in 1970 as an 18-disc set by Murray Hill Records). The series contains all of Bach's major, and many minor, pieces, with the exception of some youthful productions (preludes, fugues, sonatas, and the like), and also does not include a harpsichord rendition of The Art of Fugue. For this recording, Galling used a "revival" instrument, a modern harpsichord with stops not found on harpsichords modeled on ancient instruments, including a 16-foot stop (one octave below the two 8-foot stops) and a lute stop which was probably not modeled on the same stop found on ancient instruments. This recording of the complete harpsichord works of Bach is currently (2017) available as a vinyl rip in the form of Mp3 files on Amazon.com.
