= Premio Mario Zanfi =

The Premio Mario Zanfi, also known as the Franz Liszt Competition in Parma, is an international piano competition held at the Parma Conservatory since 1981. Past jurors include Lazar Berman, Louis Kentner, Jenő Jandó, Leslie Howard, Azio Corghi, Gleb Axelrod and Boris Petrushansky. It is a member of the Alink-Argerich Foundation.

Past winners have been:

Year	1st prize	2nd prize	3rd prize	Honorable mention
1981	Roger Muraro	(not awarded)	Kemal Gekić	
1984	Bernd Glemser	Fred Höricke	Michael Gaechter	Chiharu Hanaoka
1986	Wonmi Kim	Giovanni Bellucci; Vittorio Bresciani (ex-a.)	Rie Nakajima	
1989	(not awarded)	Fred Höricke	Irina Nikolayeva	Elena Kuschnerova; Sergei Reznikov
1992	Nikolai Maloff	Masatoshi Matsumoto	Katariina Liimatainen	
1996	Alexander Onkin	Ave Nahkur	Ekaterina Magdalitz	
2000	Massimiliano Motterle	(not awarded)	Alexei Gulenco; Wojciech Waleczek (ex-a.)	
2007	(not awarded)	Pietro Ceresini	(not awarded)	
2011	(not awarded)	Goran Filipec	Matteo Andri; Manila Santini (ex-a.)	
2015	(not awarded)	Eduard Kiprskiy	Chiyan Wong	
