= Adolf Scherbaum =

Czech-German classical trumpet player

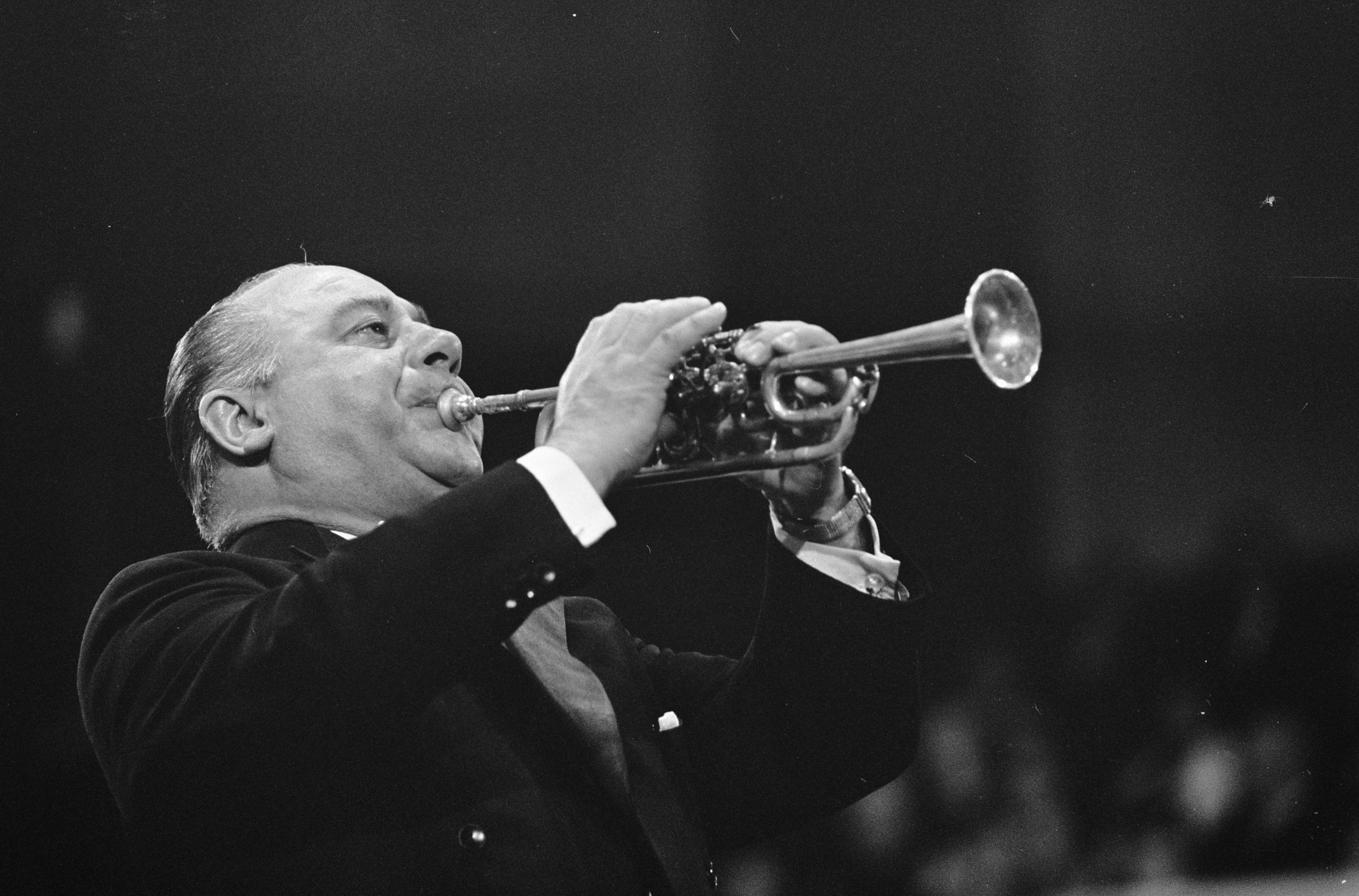
- Scherbaum in 1967

Background information
- Born: 23 August 1909; Cheb, Bohemia, Austria-Hungary
- Died: 2 August 2000 (aged 90) Sulzbach-Rosenberg, Bavaria, Germany
- Instruments: Trumpet, piccolo trumpet
- Formerly of: Berlin Philharmonic

Adolf Scherbaum (23 August 1909 – 2 August 2000) was Czech-German a trumpet player who specialised in the piccolo trumpet. Until 1951, he lived in Czechoslovakia, but then he became a citizen of West Germany.

== Life ==
Scherbaum was born on 23 August 1909 in of Cheb in Bohemia, Austria-Hungary (now the Czech Republic). He studied at the Military Music School in Prague in 1923–1928, then he studied in Vienna with Prof. Dengler until 1929. He received his first appointment as trumpet soloist at the National Theatre Brno, where he worked from 1930 to 1939, followed by performances in Prague at the Deutsche Philharmonie under Joseph Keilberth (in 1939–1941) and in Berlin with the Berlin Philharmonic under Wilhelm Furtwängler (in 1941–1945).

In 1946, he was appointed to the Academy of Performing Arts in Bratislava. In 1951, he was able to leave legally Czechoslovakia and move to West Germany. There he performed with the Norddeutscher Rundfunk in Hamburg in 1951–1964 and taught at the Hochschule für Musik Saar in Saarbrücken.

In 1962–1963, Scherbaum toured in North America, where he performed as a soloist with various orchestras. He died on 2 August 2000 in Sulzbach-Rosenberg, a few days before his 91st birthday.

== Honours ==
In 1968, Scherbaum received the internationally renowned Nordgau Prize. In 1979, the town of Sulzbach-Rosenberg awarded him the Culture Prize. In 1979, he also received the Albert Schweitzer Peace Medal, and the Sudeten German Association awarded him with the Culture Prize for Performing and Artistic Arts.
