= Walter Blankenheim =

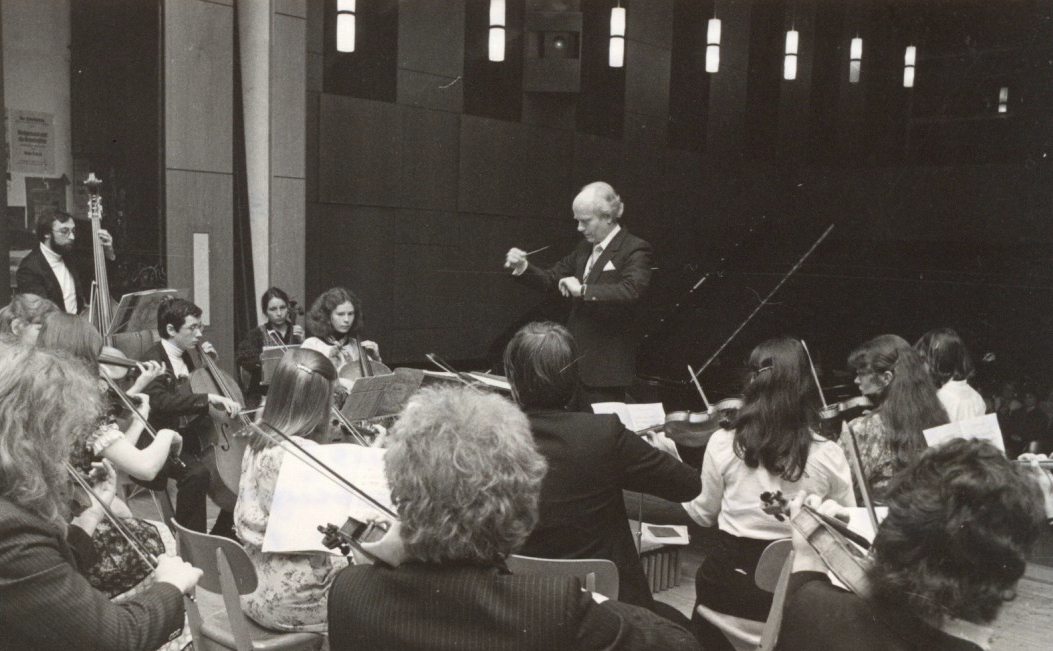
Walter Blankenheim conducting

Walter Blankenheim (30 August 1926 – 11 March 2007) was a German pianist, teacher and conductor, noted for his advocacy of the music of Johann Sebastian Bach.

He studied at the Musikhochschule Stuttgart (1946–1954) with Jürgen Uhde and Vladimir Horbowski and later in Paris with Marguerite Long. Further studies included courses with Géza Anda and Wilhelm Kempff. He won prizes in a number of competitions, including: Vercelli 1952 (2nd Prize), München – ARD 1952 and 1953 (Diplomas), Paris 1953 (Diploma), Casella 1954 (1st Prize). He was renowned for his interpretations of Johann Sebastian Bach and Wolfgang Amadeus Mozart, and he toured extensively as a recitalist and concerto soloist for over 50 years, performing in West Europe, Russia, the near and far East, the United States and Latin America. He recorded works from the Baroque to the 20th century with different radio stations, such as Saarland Radio (Saarländischer Rundfunk) in Germany. Some of his recordings (such as the 1996 recording of the Six Partitas BWV 825–830) have been re-released.

Walter Blankenheim had an active teaching career, being a professor of piano at the Hochschule für Musik Saar (Conservatorium of Music in Saarbrücken), while his masterclasses on Bach interpretation took him to a number of countries. He was also frequently invited to be on the jury of piano competitions.

== Contribution ==
Well known in his time for his interpretations of the music of Mozart and Bach, and his pedagogical activity (in particular his courses devoted to Bach interpretation), he is now remembered as the founder of the International Piano Competition J. S. Bach, Würzburg. The competition was founded in 1990 and took place for the first time in 1992. It was initially held in Saarbrücken, but is now held in Würzburg, under the direction of Inge Rosar. With 825 competitors from 59 countries (as of the 10th competition in 2019), it is the largest Bach piano competition in the world, and the only international Bach piano competition where the repertoire consists solely of the works of J. S. Bach.

His contribution to Bach interpretation was the development of a system of interpreting Bach's keyboard works on the modern piano, processing the neutral urtext of the works to help the performer understand and convey parameters such as tempo, structure, articulation, ornaments, dynamics as well as the architecture of the work, portraying a "living structure" and a balance between "energy and relaxation". Walter Blankenheim wrote an essay exploring these ideas, titled: "Problems and Chances in the interpretation of J. S. Bach's keyboard works on the modern piano"
