= Theo Brandmüller =

German contemporary composer and organist

Theo Brandmüller (* 2 February 1948 in Mainz; † 26 November 2012 in Saarbrücken) was a German composer of contemporary music, organist and university Professor.

== Life ==
Brandmüller studied school and church music as well as composition with Giselher Klebe, Olivier Messiaen and Cristóbal Halffter and instrumental theatre with Mauricio Kagel; he was accepted as a scholarship holder of the Studienstiftung des deutschen Volkes.

After working as organist at St. George's in Mainz-Bretzenheim, he received a call to the Hochschule für Musik Saar in 1979. There he first worked as professor for music theory, then for composition, analysis and organ improvisation. Later he was also director of the Institute for Contemporary Music. Since 1982 he has also been titular organist at the Ludwigskirche in Saarbrücken and since 1986 consiliarius of the Consociatio Internationalis Musicae Sacrae in Rome.

He achieved his international breakthrough as a composer in 1977 at the World Music Days in Athens with the work Ach, trauriger Mond, a commissioned work for Südwestfunk.

His compositional output, consisting of some 130 works, includes secular music and church music, chamber and vocal music as well as music for stage works and symphonic compositions. An opera commissioned by the Saarland State Theatre remained unfinished. He found inspiration for his compositions in the poetry of Christian Morgenstern and Federico García Lorca, among others, as well as in the fine arts (such as Paul Klee).

In addition to his work as a university lecturer, he was also active as a lecturer in various composition courses: he supervised the youth composition courses of the Jeunesses Musicales and taught at the "Forum junger Komponisten". He was also active internationally as a lecturer in organ composition and improvisation.

In his worldwide organ concerts, Brandmüller preferred contemporary works and improvisations. He worked with internationally renowned conductors such as Marcello Viotti, Max Pommer, Gabriel Chmura, Leif Segerstam, Cristóbal Halffter and Peter Ruzicka.

== Awards ==
- 1972: Prize for Composers of the State of Rhineland-Palatinate
- 1977: Composition Prize of the City of Stuttgart
- 1979: Rome Prize of the Villa Massimo
- 1986: Art Prize of the Saarland
- 1986: Prix Marzena, Seattle
- 1998: Art Prize of Rhineland-Palatinate
- 2005: Honorary Diploma of the Observatoire des Relations Franco-Allemandes pour la Construction Européenne
- 2007: Guest of Honour of the Villa Massimo (Rome)

== Works (selection) ==
=== Chamber music ===
- Musik der Stille und Obertöne (1972, rev. 1978) für for piano trio and percussion
- Cis-Cantus II (1986) for viola, violoncello and double bass
- Still und heiter (1991) for recorder (Sino.A.T.B) and percussion
- Konzert auf dem E-Zweig (1991) (after a picture by Paul Klee) for viola solo (dedicated to Eckart Schloifer)
- Imaginations (1991) for viola and chamber ensemble
- Nirwana-Fax I – in memoriam John Cage (1996) for chamber ensemble
- Nirwana-Fax II – in memoriam Olivier Messiaen (1996/97) for chamber ensemble
- Nachtflug mit Messiaenfenster (2008) for piano quartet
- Geheime Botschaften (2012) for clarinet quintet

=== Concert works ===
- Sonata a tre (1973) for flute, mezzo-soprano and violoncello
- Apokalyptische Vision (1975) for bass voice and organ after words from the Holy Scriptures
- Reminiszenzen (1975, rev. 1976) for orchestra
- Ach, trauriger Mond (1977).. Lament for Federico García Lorca for percussion solo and strings
- Morgenstern – Abendstern (1977). "Settings" of some evening poems by Christian Morgenstern for baritone, two pianos, tuba, double bass and percussion.
- Wie Du unseren Vätern geschworen hast (1978). Cantata for alto voice, two trumpets, two trombones, organ after texts of the Holy Scripture
- Dramma per Musica (1979/80) for large orchestra
- Venezianische Schatten (1981). Epitaph to Igor Stravinsky for small orchestra
- Konzert für Orgel und Orchester (1981) - Concerto for organ and orchestra
- U(h)rtöne (1985) for large orchestra
- Cis-Cantus III „Lorca-Kathedralen" (1987) for large orchestra
- OrganuM–zart (1991). Orchestral fantasy on a Mozartian minor triad for clarinet, strings, percussion and organ
- Und der Mond heftet ins Meer ein langes Horn aus Licht und Tanz (1992/93). 5 cosmic episodes for viola, violoncello, double bass and large orchestra (with tape) after text ideas by Federico García Lorca
- Chimères (1996) for saxophone quartet and orchestra (with tape)
- Antigone (1999) 3rd sound song for choir with soli, 2 pianos and percussion
- Lass den Balkon geöffnet (2004/05). 5 Night Calls for orchestra

=== Stage music ===
- for Zwei zu Ross und einer auf dem Esel by Oldřich Daněk
- for Die Bluthochzeit by Federico García Lorca
- for Hamlet by William Shakespeare
- for Sir John und Goldjunge Heinz (freely based on The Merry Wives of Windsor)
- for Katharina Knie by Carl Zuckmayer
- Löwe, leih mir deine Stimme. Luzifer-Monodram (1999–2000) after a poem by Johannes Kühn

=== Organ works ===
- Hommage à Pérotin (1978) for organ
- La nuit de Pâques (1980). A Litany for Organ and Live Electronics
- Innenlicht (1982) for organ
- Sieben Stücke zur Passionszeit (1983) for organ
- Enigma I (1989) for violin and organ
- Monodie für I. in memoriam Isang Yun (1995) for organ
- Drei Engel für Scelsi (2001) for three clarinets and organ
- Norge (2007). Mountain resonances with shepherd calls for Organ

== Pupils ==
His students include, among others: Manuel Gera (* 1963), Zeynep Gedizlioğlu (* 1977), Wolfram Graf (* 1965), Han Aseon (* 1963), Christian Klein (* 1967), Stefan Lindemann (* 1969), Karola Obermüller (* 1977), Javier Party (* 1980), Marc Schubring (* 1968), Wang Lin (王琳) (* 1976), Anton Steinecker (* 1971) and the organist Dan Zerfaß (* 1968), Seunglim Kim(* 1971), Seunghyuck Lim(* 1978), Jaekyung Lim(* 1978), Hyeyoon Ahn(* 1980).

== Literature ==
- Theo Brandmüller: Arrièregarde – Avantgarde. Texte zur Musik 1980–1998. (= Quellentexte zur Musik des 20. Jahrhunderts. Bd. 6.1.) Edited by Stefan Fricke, Wolfgang Frobenius, Sigrid Konrad and Friedrich Spangemacher. Pfau-Verlag, Saarbrücken 1998, ISBN 3-89727-006-4.
- Joachim Dorfmüller: Impulse von Perotin bis Messiaen. Zum Schaffen Theo Brandmüllers für und mit Orgel. In: Musica Sacra. Regensburg 1980. Pages 316–318.
- Jörg Abbing, Sigrid Konrad: Vingt Regards sur Theo. Komponist, Konzertorganist, Hochschullehrer. Pfau-Verlag, Saarbrücken 2013, ISBN 978-3-89727-496-9.
- Friedrich Spangemacher: Creator, Spiritus, Musicus: Theo Brandmüller – eine Biographie. Pfau-Verlag, Saarbrücken 2013, ISBN 978-3-89727-497-6.

== Discography ==
- Canzona lirica e danza di morte. Reinbert Evers (guitar). CD Darbinghaus and Grimm 3292
- Cis-Cantus II. trio basso. CD Koch-Schwann 310 041
- Enigma I. Christiane Edinger (violin), Theo Brandmüller (organ). CD MDG 625 0551-2
- Enigma III „Ex oriente lux". Albert Schönberger (organ), Benedikt Sturm and Christopher Ludwig (boy sopranos of the Mainz Cathedral Choir), Mainzer Dombläser, Direction: Mathias Breitschaft. CD "Komponisten aus Rheinland-Pfalz", Studio Tonmeister 10778-01
- "Und der Mond heftet ins Meer ein langes Horn aus Licht und Tanz ...". Contra-Trio, Radio-Sinfonieorchester Saarbrücken, direction: Marcello Viotti. CD MDG 625 0551-2
