= Pedro Ipuche Riva =

Uruguayan composer

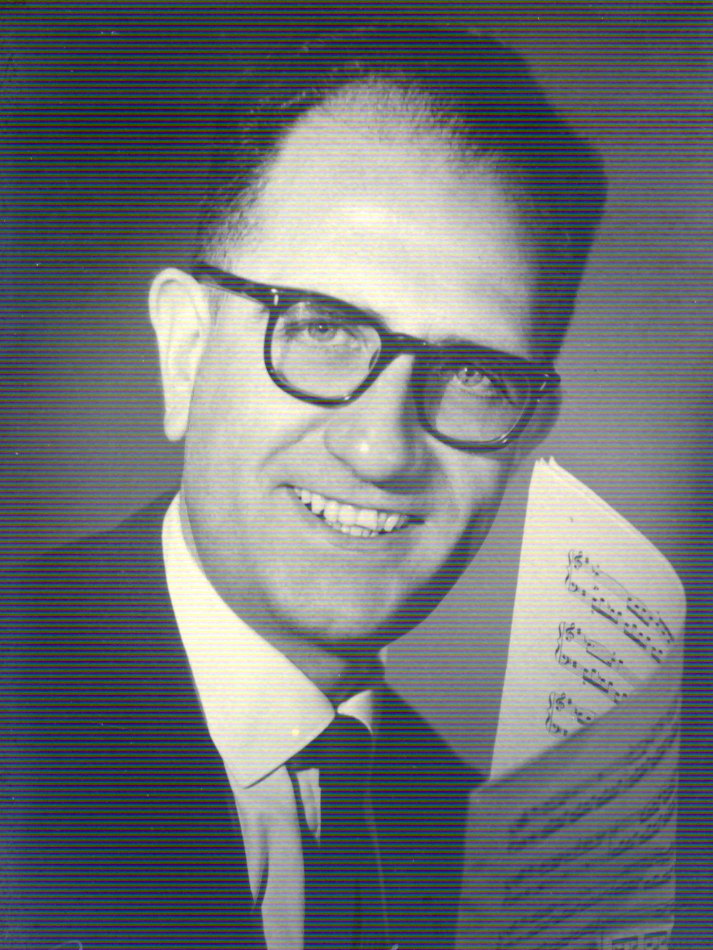
fotografía de Pedro Ipuche Riva

Pedro Ipuche Riva (26 October 1924 – 25 December 1996) was an Uruguayan composer of classical music. According to the catalogue by the Uruguayan musicologist Elsa Sabatés in Músicos de aquí, Vol 4 (published by C.E.M.A.U. in 1997) he wrote 150 compositions, including 6 symphonies and 2 operas.

== Life and career ==
Ipuche Riva was born in Montevideo, the son of Uruguayan poet Pedro Leandro Ipuche. His sister, Rolina Ipuche, was a writer. He began his musical studies with the composers Carlos Giucci and Vicente Ascone, but dissatisfied with his first compositions, he destroyed them all and became a lawyer.

When Carlos Estrada created the Conservatorio Nacional de Música (National Conservatory of Music), Ipuche Riva completed the course in composition. Some of his fellow students were the future conductors José Serebrier and Beatriz Lockhart. After receiving his diploma he went to Paris to study with Jean Rivier and Noël Gallon at the Conservatoire National Supérieur de Musique.

On his return to Uruguay, he tried to be more experimental while working independently from the avant-garde mainstream of his time. He called this his "obscure period".

He was appointed to several official posts including Artistic Director of the Uruguayan national broadcasting service SODRE, and director of the Conservatory, which he re-founded as "Conservatorio Universitario de Música". He held those positions for many years. After attending a congress in Jamaica about the relationship between classical and popular music he started his "Classic pop period".

After retiring from his official posts, he began an "introspective period" and devoted himself mainly to composing two operas.

== Personal life ==
Ipuche Riva was married to the soprano Natalia Zimarioff. His son Gabriel Ipuche is a composer and pianist.

== Main works ==
- Sarabanda, Recitativo y Allegro for oboe and piano
- Aire de octubre for soprano and piano
- Concerto Grosso for strings orchestra
- First Simfonietta
- Sonata en re for viola and piano (1959–1961)
- Suite Barroca for piano (including Siciliana)
- Cantata a Artigas for baritone, chorus and orchestra
- Chemical products
- Kleine Suite for guitar published by TONOS, Darmstadt
- Pedro de Urdemalas, music for the last work staged by Margarita Xirgu
- Animales ilustres for wind quintet
- The artist and his world, 3rd Symphony
- Classic pop 2 for orchestra
- Pop Symphony, 4th Symphony
- Jazz Funeral, 5th Symphony
- Mateando for guitar, published by TONOS, Darmstadt
- Concerto for piano and orchestra
- Concerto for timpani and orchestra
- Maja (opera based on La maja desnuda by Ruben Loza Aguerrebere)
- Opera Opus Operatorum (opera for puppets conceived by Roberto Rius)
- Padrenuestro rioplatense año 2000 (his last composition for voice and piano)

== Performers of Ipuche Riva's music ==
- Conductors: José Serebrier, José Antonio Abreu, Howard Mitchell, John Carewe, Tõnu Kalam, Gisele Ben-Dor, Jacques Houtmann, Jean Meylan, Pedro Pirfano, Mario Benzecry, Piero Gamba, Jacques Bodmer, Nino Stinco, Juan Carlos Zorzi, Carlos Estrada, Hugo López Chirico, Juan Protasi
- Orchestras: OSSODRE, Orquesta Sinfónica Municipal de Montevideo, Moscow Radio Symphony Orchestra, CBC Winnipeg Orchestra (Canada), Orquesta de Cámara Mayo (Buenos Aires, Argentina), Orquesta Sinfónica Nacional de Santiago de Chile, University of Miami Orchestra (USA), Orquesta Sinfónica Simón Bolívar (Caracas, Venezuela), Tasmanian Symphony Orchestra (Australia)
- Pianists: Nibya Mariño, Fanny Ingold, Élida Gencarelli, Raquel Boldorini, Victoria Schenini, Alba Acone, Carlos Cebro
- Other instrumental soloists: oboists Jean-Louis Leroux and León Biriotti, bandoneónist René Marino Rivero, and harpsichordist María Teresa Chenlo
- Singers: Natalia Zimarioff, Martha Fornella, Rita Contino, Graciela Lassner, Jovita Gómez Couto, Cecilia Latorre, Rina Baffa, Walter Mendeguía, Claudio Sotelo, Enrique Guberna, Eduardo García de Zúñiga
