= Joseph Hallman =

American composer

Joseph Hallman (born Nov. 20, 1979) is an American composer. A functional orphan, Hallman was born and raised in the Kensington neighborhood of Philadelphia, Pennsylvania. He attended Girard College from first to twelfth grades. Based in Philadelphia, Hallman's works have been performed internationally. His music has been described as eclectic, merging classical, Renaissance, and contemporary popular styles. Hallman also teaches composition at Drexel University.

== Early life ==
Hallman began composing at the age of 12. He graduated from the Cleveland Institute of Music, where he studied with Margaret Brouwer. He continued his studies with masterclasses by George Crumb. Christopher Rouse, John Corigliano, Steven Mackey, John Harbison and others.

== Career ==
Hallman is composer-in-residence at the Rosenbach Museum & Library of Philadelphia and the Pikes Falls Chamber Music Festival. He has collaborated with leading performers and ensembles. Cellist Alisa Weilerstein performed his concerto for cello and chamber ensemble with the St. Petersburg Chamber Philharmonic in Russia. A series of concerti grossi, inspired by Johann Sebastian Bach's Brandenburg Concertos, was performed by members of the Philadelphia Orchestra, New York Philharmonic, Pittsburgh Symphony, and Cleveland Orchestra. The Cavani Quartet has premiered his compositions. His ballet Alice was performed in April 2010 by the Colette Harding Dance Company in San Diego. He has worked closely with poet Jessica Hornik, and his settings of three of her poems is included in the album "Sprung Rhythm" by the Washington DC ensemble Inscape, which was nominated for the 2014 Grammy award.

Hallman has worked with many other writers including the Vermont Poet Laureate, Sydney Lea. Lea called his collaboration with Hallman, which was sponsored by the Vermont College of Fine Arts, “a high point of my term as poet laureate. It’s been so refreshing and so different, a great shot in the arm.” He also collaborated on a new choral work with the writer and director Antwone Fisher.

== Awards and accolades ==
Hallman's compositions have won numerous awards, including the Marcel Dik prize, the Donald Erb prize, and the Darius Milhaud award He has won numerous accolades, including selection as one of the 100 leading composers under 40 by NPR in 2011, and was nominated for a 2014 Grammy Award.

Critics have praised Hallman's work. "[Hallman's music] is for acoustic instruments -- no computers, no electronic processing -- and it is music that is long on harmonic and melodic interest and blessedly short on intellectual or mathematical gimmicks, without sounding overly neo-Romantic or derivative", wrote music critic Charles Downey of the Washington Post "Two pieces by Joseph Hallman singled him out as the one to watch, especially 'Imagined Landscapes,' six atmospheric miniatures inspired by the nightmares of H. P. Lovecraft. Even the use of whispers, shouts and other noises did not seem like a cheap effect but part of a musical whole, a complement to the composer’s skillful handling of each instrument," wrote Downey in a separate review. of his "Three Hornik Poems" the critic Steve Smith stated in the New York Times [that it is] "a buoyant song cycle by Mr. Hallman that simply must be heard". Ronni Reich of the Washington post wrote that Hallman's compositions are "reminiscent of Dominick Argento, contemporary soundscapes and Renaissance music.". Joseph again collaborated with Alisa Weilerstein in 2024-5, writing a work to be featured in her multiyear, multimedia "Fragments" project. This work will be performed at halls across the globe, including Carnegie Hall. "FRAGMENTS" weaves together the individual movements of Bach’s Six Solo Cello Suites with newly-commissioned works.
