= Marc Engelhardt =

German bassoonist

Marc Engelhardt is a German bassoonist.

From 1976 to 1982, he studied with Günter Pfitzenmaier in Cologne and from 1982 to 1986, with Klaus Thunemann in Hannover. Engelhardt is an alumnus of the German National Youth Orchestra and the European Union Youth Orchestra, and was appointed principal bassoonist with the Saarbrücken Radio Orchestra in 1986. He has performed as a soloist with European orchestras and has also performed as guest principal bassoonist in several major German orchestras such as: Bavarian Radio Symphony Orchestra, WDR Symphony Orchestra Cologne, Hessischer Rundfunk Symphony Orchestra, North German Radio Symphony Orchestra, Southwest German Radio Symphony Orchestra and Bamberg Symphony.

Since 1995 Marc Engelhardt has taught at both the Saar Academy of Music and the State University of Music and Performing Arts Stuttgart, where he has been Professor of Bassoon since 2004. Engelhardt has given master classes in Russia, China, Korea and Europe, and is a faculty member of the Internationale Bachakademie Stuttgart's Festival Ensemble programme for young musicians.
