= Cavani String Quartet =

The Cavani String Quartet is an American string quartet based in Cleveland, Ohio. The quartet is named for the 19th century violin makers Giovanni and Vincenzo Cavani.

The quartet formed in 1984 and became the Quartet-in-Residence at the Cleveland Institute of Music in 1988. They have collaborated for many years in special performances with the poet Mwatabu Okantah.

The quartet has recorded music by Béla Bartók, Maurice Ravel, Antonín Dvořák, Robert Schumann, Johannes Brahms, Dan Welcher, Donald Erb, Ernest Chausson, Leo Brouwer, and James Primosch for the Albany, Azica, Gasparo, New World, and Pantheon labels. They won the Naumburg Chamber Music Award in 1989. For their 20th anniversary, they commissioned the work Musings for String Quintet from composer Joseph Hallman. The premiere took place with Alisa Weilerstein, cellist, at the Cleveland Institute of Music.

The quartet has been partners with many organizations, including the Chamber Music Connection, led by Debbie Price. They also run many free concerts for growing and learning string players, many of whom are under age 18.

In June 2018, the Cleveland Institute of Music announced the severance of its affiliation with the Cavani String Quartet.

== Members ==
- Annie Fullard, violin I (founding member)
- Catherine Cosbey, violin II (joined 2019)
- Eric Wong, viola (joined 2016)
- Kyle Price, cello (joined 2019)

== Past members ==
- Kirsten Docter, viola (1993–2016)
- Merry Peckham, cello (founding member 1984–2016)
- Erika Eckert, viola (founding member 1984–1993)
- Mari Sato, violin (1995–2019)
- Susan Waterbury, violin (founding member)
- Si-Yan Darren Li, cello (2017–2018)
