= Karola Obermueller =

German classical music composer (born 1977)

- Karola Obermüller
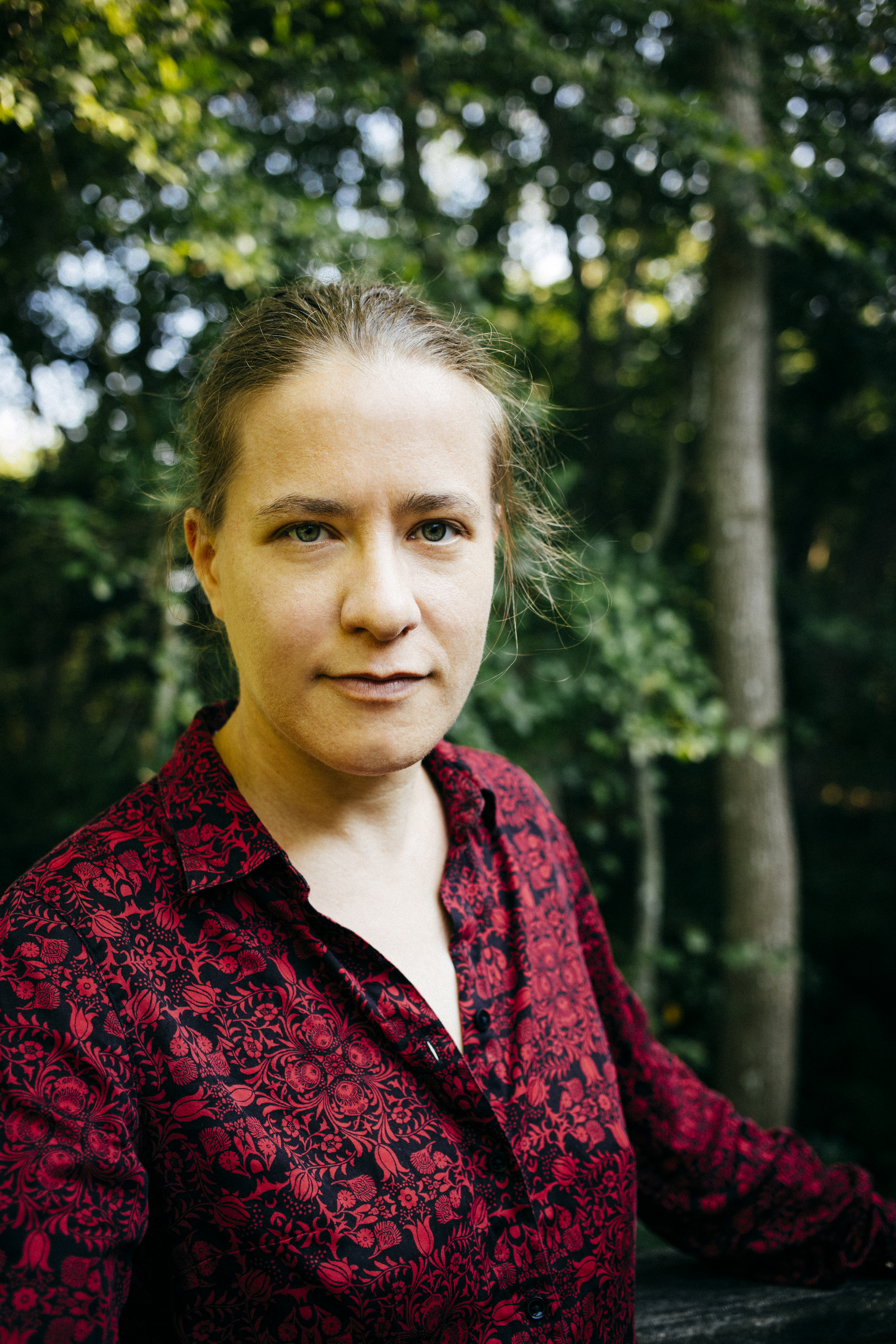
- Born: 21 March 1977 (age 49); Darmstadt, West Germany
- Occupations: Composer and teacher
- Website: www.karolaobermueller.net

Karola Obermueller (born 21 March 1977, Darmstadt) is a German composer and teacher.

== Life ==
Obermueller began her training at the Akademie für Tonkunst in Darmstadt. She studied composition with Volker Blumenthaler of the Meistersinger-Konservatorium and the Hochschule für Musik Nürnberg, Theo Brandmüller of the Hochschule für Musik Saar, and Adriana Hölszky of the Mozarteum Salzburg. In 2010, she completed a doctorate at Harvard University in Cambridge, Massachusetts, where she studied with Mario Davidovsky, Bernard Rands, Julian Anderson, Chaya Czernowin, Magnus Lindberg, and Harrison Birtwistle. She has taught at Wellesley College and the Young Composers Program at the Cleveland Institute of Music. Since 2010, Obermueller has been one of the directors of the composition program at the University of New Mexico.

A portrait CD of hers was released as part of the WERGO Contemporary Music Edition by the German Music Council. She has received the Darmstädter Musikpreis and the Bayerischer Jugendpreis des Indien-Instituts München, as well as awards and commissions from the Fromm Foundation commission, the ASCAP Morton Gould Awards, and the Bohemians New York Musicians Club. She did a residency at the Deutsches Studienzentrum in Venedig.

Obermueller frequently collaborates with her husband, American composer, Peter Gilbert. In addition to two operas, they have created an interactive installation piece called An Overlapping of Spaces, which combined a series of hanging surround-sound speaker arrays with unique iPod-based audience-interactivity. The work was featured as a centerpiece of the Perceiving Space in Art Gallery at the Davis Museum and Cultural Center between 2008 and 2010, which had previously chosen it as an Artwork of the Month. Their most recent collaboration, Listening to Mountains, was presented in Germany and Australia.

Obermueller and Gilbert teach together at the University of New Mexico and have two children.

== Operas ==
Obermueller's first opera, Dunkelrot ("Dark Red"), was written for the opera in Nürnberg after an original libretto by Gabriele Strassmann. The opera tells the tale of an African woman seeking asylum in Germany who gets lost in the German immigration system. Her second opera, Helges Leben ("Helge's Life"), was an adaptation of the eponymous play by Sibylle Berg, and was written with composer Mark Moebius. In 2009, the opera had its well-received premiere by the Theater Bielefeld, in cooperation with the Deutsche Bank Stiftung and the NRW KULTURsekretariat.

Gilbert and Obermueller have collaborated on two operas. Their multi-media, electronic chamber opera, Dreimaldrei gleich unendlich ("Three times three equals eternity"), has been performed in Germany and the United States, including a premiere as part of the Musik der Jahrhunderte festival in Stuttgart. A prize-winner at the National Opera Association awards, their opera was included in an exhibition celebrating the 20th anniversary of the Center for Art and Media Karlsruhe. They also worked together on Robert S., an opera performed with Theater Bonn, with the composers Georg Katzer, Annette Schlünz, Peter Gilbert, and Sergej Newski. The complete opera is published by Ricordi.

== Works ==
=== Stage works ===
- Robert S. (2011), opera for 4 singers, and chamber orchestra
- Helges Leben (2008/09)
- dreimaldrei gleich unendlich (2009), opera for 4 singers, 2 actors, clarinet, cello, accordion, live electronics and live video
- Dunkelrot (Dark Red) (2005–2007), opera for 7 singers, actress, live electronics and chamber orchestra
- Protuberanzen II (2001/02) for trumpet, organ, violoncello, percussion and dancers
- Protuberanzen I (2001) for trumpet, organ, violoncello and dancers
- My name is Urlappi(1998/99), chamber opera for soprano, mezzo-soprano, violin, saxophone and percussion

=== Vocal works ===
- mass.distance.time (2010) for choir
- Untergegangen der Mond (2008) for countertenor/bass and ensemble
- in zwischen (in between / in the meantime) (2004) for soprano, recorder, 3 violas, 2 viola da gambas and harpsichord
- Einseitige Dialogue(one-sided dialogues) (2000–2002), three for mezzo-soprano and piano
- Three songs about love (1992–94) for mezzo-soprano, baritone, piano, marimbaphone and two violoncelli
- The Gold (1999) for mezzo-soprano and percussion

=== Orchestra works ===
- Glaube. Merke Rolle. (2011) Hommage à Mauricio Kagel for 10 instruments and voice
- Kohlenmonoxyd.Nachtstück (2006) for two sopranos, narrator, choir and nine instruments (flute, clarinet, horn, trombone, percussion, 2 violins, viola and violoncello)
- helical (2005/2006) for chamber orchestra
- Schalen (peels / shells) (2005) for orchestra
- volatile (2003/2004/2005) for chamber orchestra
- Im Vorraum (In the anteroom) (2000–2002) for orchestra

=== Chamber music ===
- Las cosas, unas conducen an otras (2002/08) for two flutes
- Für Wilfried (2008) for horn solo, collaborative composition with Peter Gilbert
- ...silbern (2008) for bass flute solo
- ...und Licht sich breitet aufs Meer... (2008) Sapphic Stanzas for soprano saxophone and live electronics
- reflejos distantes (2006) for bass flute, bass clarinet, violin and violoncello
- Red Lake Fields 2 (2002/2006) for flute, clarinet, violin, violoncello and percussion
- will o' wisp (2006) for recorder, flute, bass-koto and accordion
- WindKaskaden (2006) for clarinet and accordion
- gegen.wind.stärken 1 (2005/2006) for great bass recorder and electronics
- Nichts Fettes nichts Süßes. (Nothing Fat nothing Sweet.) (2001/2005) – in memoriam Clara & Robert Schumann – for clarinet, alto saxophone, piano and percussion
- xs (2005) for string quartet
- Knotenpunkte (points of knotting) (2005) for alto flute, clarinet, harp and string quartet
- les sables mouvants(quicksand / drifting sand) (2004) for clarinet, piano, violin and violoncello
- shraeng (2004) for two electric guitars, dedicated to the guitar duo
- but one adagio smile still lingers (2004) in memoriam Rose Ausländer for violoncello solo
- Metamorphosen (metamorphoses) (since 2003) for oboe solo
- Kalpa><Pralaya (2002) for bansuri, sitar, mridangam and orchestra
- Red Lake Fields (2001/02) for flute, clarinet, violin, violoncello and piano
- Protuberanzen II (2001/02) for trumpet, organ, violoncello, percussion and dancers
- duo variabile I (2001/02) for flute and recorder
- Protuberanzen I (2001) for trumpet, organ, violoncello and dancers
- the great secret lies (2001) for pipa, kayagum and marimbaphone
- ....incalzando....(1999-01) cor anglais and organ
- Music for recorder, harp and harpsichord (1999/00)
- Five scraps of fury(1995–98) for piano solo
- String Quintet 1997 (1996–98) for two violins, viola, violoncello and double-bass

=== CDs ===
- 2018 Edition Zeitgenössische Musik
- 2020 Voices of the Pearl, Vol. 3
- 2020 Music for English Horn Alone

=== Video ===
- Trailer for Dreimaldrei Gleich Unendlich
- "VIDEO". DW-TV. Archived from the original on 15 April 2014.
- Listening to Mountains demo

=== Books ===
- Charlotte Martin: …denn Kunst meint ja immer ein Sich-Preisgeben. Drei Portraits. Darmstadt 2006. ISBN 978-3873902060

== Sources ==
- The University of New Mexico – Karola Obermueller
