= Piccolo trumpet =

High-pitched brass instrument in the trumpet family

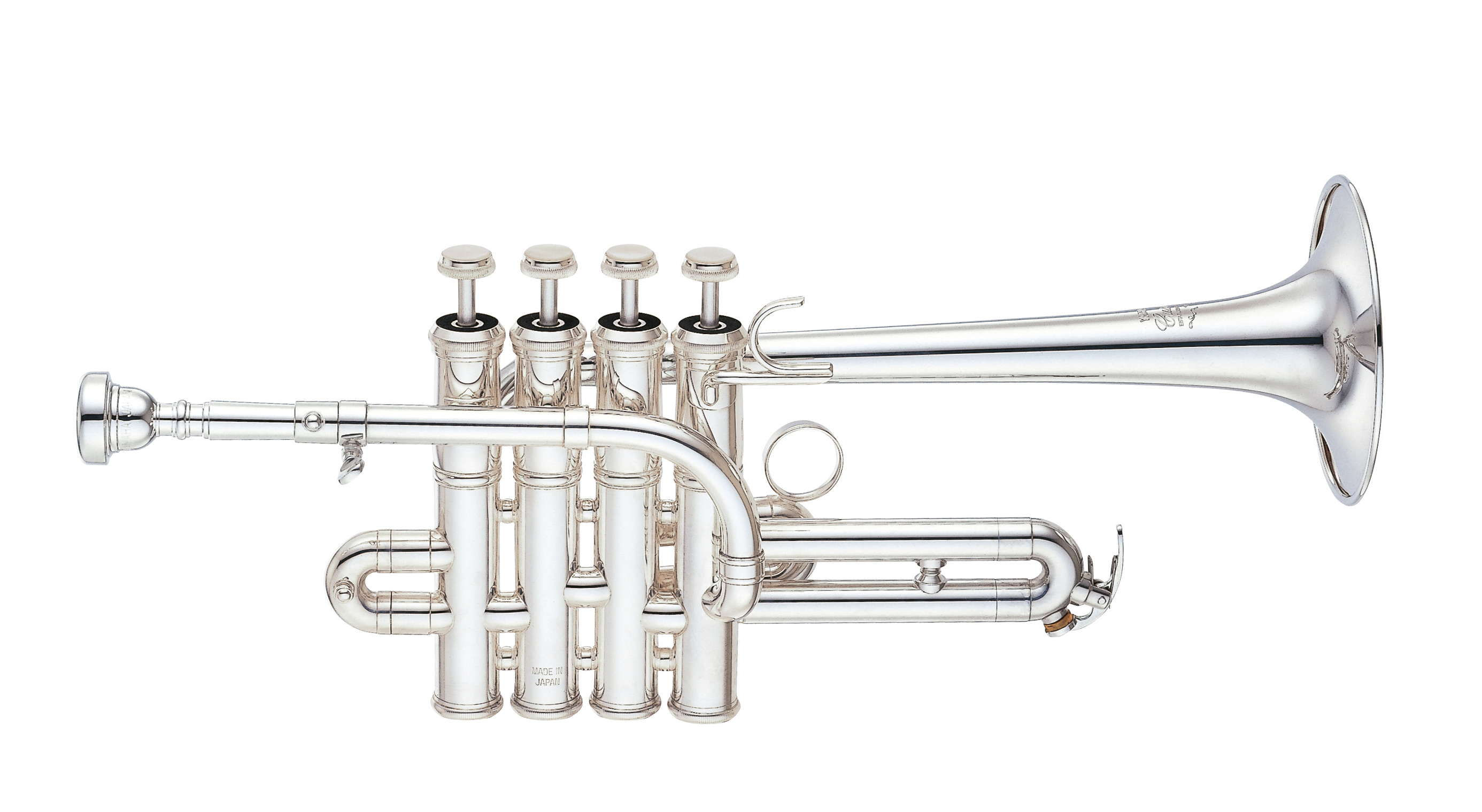
- Piccolo trumpet in B♭

Brass instrument
- Other names: Sopranino trumpet
- Hornbostel–Sachs classification: 423.233 (Valved aerophone sounded by lip vibration)
- Developed: Modern piccolo developed from the valved Bach trumpet in D, late 19th century

Playing range
- Range of the four-valve piccolo trumpet in B♭

Related instruments
- Clarion; trumpet; piccolo trombone; soprano cornet

Builders
- Bach; Getzen; Schilke; Schiller; Selmer; Thein; Yamaha

The piccolo trumpet is the smallest member of the trumpet family, pitched one octave higher than the standard B♭ trumpet. Most piccolo trumpets are built to play in either B♭ or A, using a separate leadpipe for each key. The tubing in the B♭ piccolo trumpet is one-half the length of that in a standard B♭ trumpet. Piccolo trumpets in G, F, and even high C are also manufactured, but are rarer.

The piccolo trumpet should not be confused with the pocket trumpet, which plays in the same pitch as the regular B♭ trumpet.

== Types and details ==
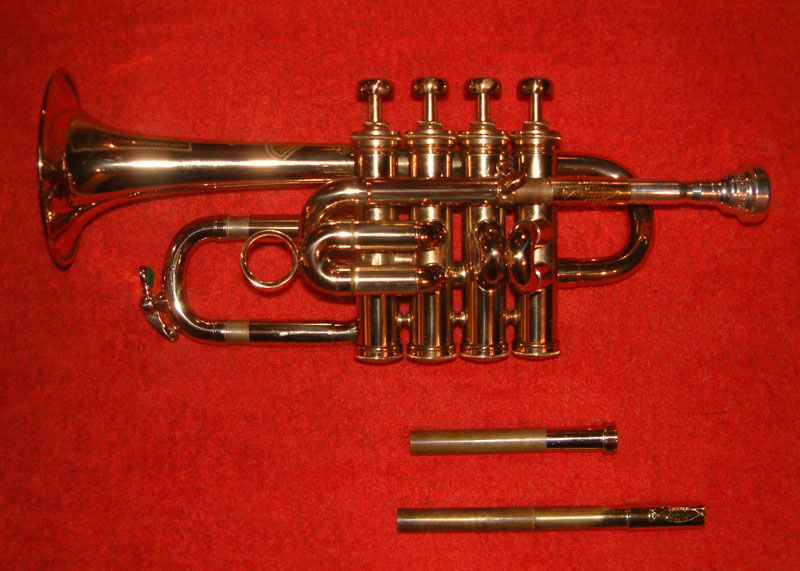
Piccolo trumpet in B♭, with separate lead pipes to tune the instrument to B♭ (shorter) or A (longer).

The piccolo trumpet in B♭ is a transposing instrument, which sounds a minor seventh higher than written. Not often called for specifically, it is often used at the player's discretion to cover high material as appropriate.

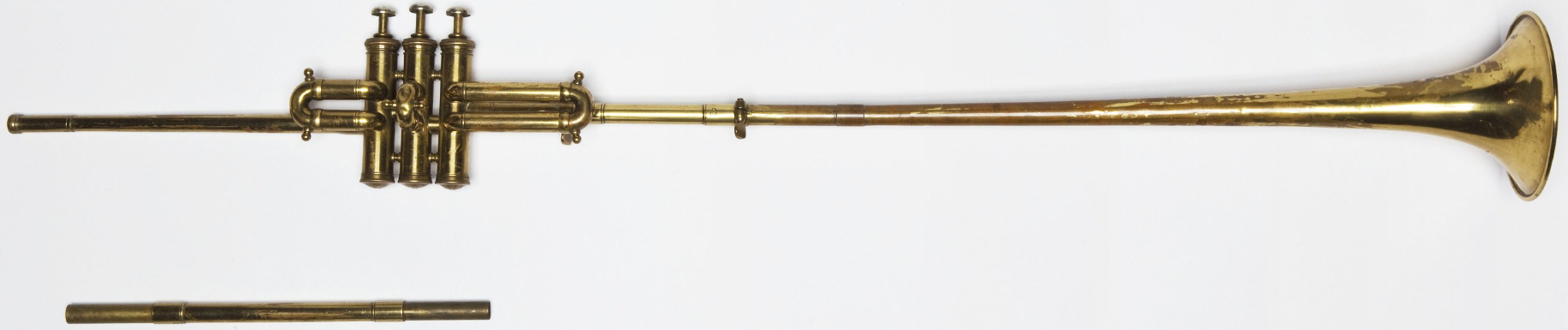
Bach trumpet, with midpipes for either E♭ or D

The piccolo trumpet in D, also known as the Bach trumpet, was invented by the Belgian instrument maker Victor Mahillon and first used in the late 19th century to play the high trumpet parts in music by Bach and Handel. Initially built in a long linear form with three piston valves, by the early 20th century it was mostly made with the more compact wrap of modern C and B♭ trumpets. The trumpet in D was called for by several composers, including Stravinsky (The Rite of Spring, Petrushka), Ravel (Boléro), and Britten (Peter Grimes).

Czech instrument maker Červený first made a piccolo cornet in high B♭ in 1862, but it did not catch on. The modern four-valve piccolo trumpet was promoted by Adolf Scherbaum and Maurice André at the Conservatoire de Paris. Scherbaum was first to specialize in the piccolo trumpet repertoire, to discover new baroque works, and to create original transcriptions, and André continued that work in collaboration with instrument builder Selmer Paris over a long career. The instrument enables players to play the difficult high trumpet parts of Baroque music, such as Bach's second Brandenburg Concerto and Mass in B minor.

The sound production technique is basically the same as that used on the larger B♭ trumpet. Air pressure and tonguing are different, and players use a shallower mouthpiece for the piccolo trumpet. Almost all piccolo trumpets have four valves instead of three; the fourth valve usually lowers the pitch by a fourth. This extends the low range and provides alternate fingerings and improved intonation for some notes.

== Use in "Penny Lane" and elsewhere ==
The piccolo trumpet solo in the Beatles' "Penny Lane", which introduced the instrument to pop music, was played by David Mason. Paul McCartney was dissatisfied with the initial attempts at the song's instrumental fill (one of which is released on Anthology 2), and was inspired to use the instrument after seeing Mason's performance in a BBC television broadcast of the second Brandenburg Concerto and asking George Martin what the "tremendously high" trumpet was. Eventually Mason recorded the solo using a piccolo trumpet in A. The piccolo trumpet was also used to quote Bach's Invention no. 8 in F major (BWV 779) during the fade-out of "All You Need Is Love".

Use of the instrument is now commonplace in many musical genres. Maurice André, Otto Sauter, Guy Touvron, Reinhold Friedrich, Adolf Scherbaum, Ludwig Güttler, Wynton Marsalis, Matthias Höfs and Håkan Hardenberger are some well-known piccolo trumpet players.

== See also ==
- Brass instrument
- Piccolo (flute)
