= Siegfried Behrend =

German musician (1933–1990)

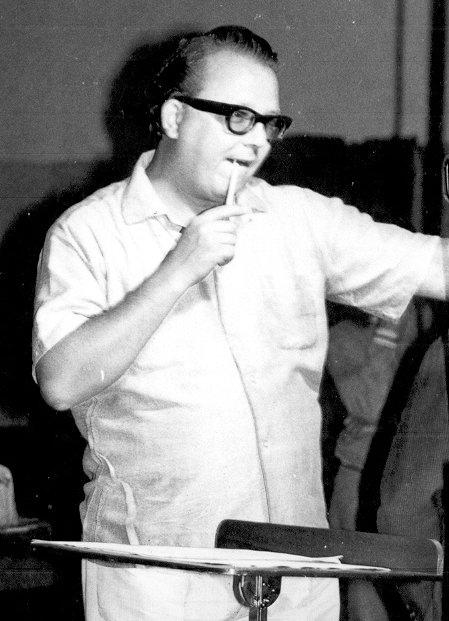
Guitarist, composer and conductor Siegfried Behrend

Siegfried Behrend (19 November 1933 – 20 September 1990) was a German classical guitarist and composer.

== Biography ==
Behrend was born in Berlin. He studied piano, harpsichord, conducting and composition at the Klindworth-Scharwenka Conservatory in Berlin and taught himself classical guitar. In 1953, he gave the first German performance of Rodrigo's Concierto de Aranjuez. At the age of 30 he already was a world-renowned artist with this instrument, playing for the Shah of Persia, the Emperor of Japan and Gamal Abdel Nasser in Cairo.

In 1962, he met singer Belina during the making of a TV show and they endeavoured to create some musical projects together. With their chansons, folk songs and Yiddish songs, they became highly respected and well-known representatives of German culture in the aftermath of World War II. They performed in more than 120 countries and were regular guests on German television and talkshows. In these years, they recorded several LP albums. In the 1970s Behrend married the German actress Claudia Brodzinska, also a singer. In performances with her, Behrend focused more on contemporary art music.

Behrend was also renowned as a teacher for classical guitar. Martin Maria Krüger began studying the instrument with Behrend. In later years, Behrend and Krüger became famous as 'The German Guitar Duo'. In the 1970s, Behrend gave several "International Masterclasses for Artistic Guitar Play" which were attended by individuals such as Michael Tröster and Manuel Negwer.

Behrend was (co-)editor of several books aimed at a professional audience, including Volkslieder aus aller Welt (Folk Songs from the World) and Gitarrenstunden für Kinder (Guitar Lessons for Children).

Together with Konrad Wölki, Herman Ambrosius, Heinrich Konietzny and others, Behrend was one of the leading proponents in the development of mandolin and plucked string music towards higher quality and enhanced expressivity in Germany after the war. Apart from many arrangements of baroque and folk music for plucked string instruments, Behrend focused on contemporary music. He conducted many premieres of works of Anestis Logothetis, Heinrich Konietzny, Klaus Hashagen, Dietrich Erdmann, Friedrich Gaitis and others. In the years 1960 to 1973, Behrend was conductor of the Saarland Plucked String Orchestra – at that time the leading plucked string orchestra in Germany. From 1968 to 1990, he conducted the newly founded German Plucked String Orchestra.

As a performer with an interest in the contemporary avant-garde, Behrend encouraged a number of composers to write works for the guitar. These included Xavier Benguerel (born 1931), Brian Boydell (1917–2000), Sylvano Bussotti (born 1931), Mario Castelnuovo-Tedesco (1895–1968), Tomás Marco (born 1942), Isang Yun (1917–1995), and Thea Musgrave (born 1928).

Behrend died in Hausham, aged 56.

== Discography (selection) ==
- Belina – Behrend 24 SONGS AND ONE GUITAR (Columbia)
- Belina and Siegfried Behrend MUSIC AROUND THE WORLD (Columbia)
- Yiddish Songs Es brennt (Columbia)
- Eviva la Guitarra – Siegfried Behrend und seine spanische Gitarre (BASF)
- Requiem auf Hiroshima (Thorofon)
- Galleria Gitarrenkonzert (Deutsche Grammophon)
- Siegfried Behrend in Memoriam (Thorofon)
- Boccherini, Schnabel: Gitarrenquintette - Siegfried Behrend, Zagreb String Quartet (Da Camera, Sastruphu, SM 93606, 1973)
- Vivaldi: Concerti for Mandolin and Other Favorites - The German String Orchestra, Siegfried Behrend (CBS 35878)

== Bibliography ==
- Helmut Richter: Siegfried Behrend 1933–1990 – Stationen. Publisher: Karl Maria Laufen, Oberhausen 2000, ISBN 3-87468-171-8. (in German)
- Maren Trekel: Siegfried Behrend: Ein Leben für die Gitarre, die Zupforchester und deren Musik (Siegfried Behrend: A life for the guitar, plucked string orchestras and their music). Diploma thesis. Published by: Trekel, Hamburg (Germany) 2000. 82 pages. (in German)
