= Maria Perrotta =

- Born: 6 November 1974 (age 51); Cosenza
- Genres: Classical
- Instrument: Piano
- Label: Decca Records

Maria Perrotta is an Italian classical pianist and Decca Records artist based in Paris.

== Life and career ==
Maria Perrotta came to the limelight in 2012, with her critically acclaimed live performance of Bach’s Goldberg Variations:

"A perfect blend of the lush pianism of Alexis Weissenberg and the laser-like focus of Glenn Gould".

In 2013, Decca released a CD of Beethoven's last three piano sonatas played live by Maria Perrotta. The recording was acclaimed in leading music journals and major newspapers:

"Where Pollini is fast and formalistic, Perrotta is analytical and expressive, but, like Pollini, always maintains a sense of formal unity."

Maria Perrotta has appeared on TV and radio broadcasts and has performed with orchestras including the RAI Symphony Orchestra and the Filarmonica Arturo Toscanini. A child prodigy, she made her debut with a symphony orchestra at the age of 11, performing Beethoven's Piano Concerto No. 1 at the Rendano Theatre of Cosenza, her native city.

A graduate of the Milan Conservatoire, the École Normale de Musique in Paris and the National Academy of St Cecilia in Rome, she has won top prizes in several international piano competitions including the 2004 International Piano Competition J.S. Bach in Germany and the 2008 Shura Cherkassky International Piano Competition in Milan.

Maria Perrotta is married to the Italian baritone Lucio Prete, with whom she has two daughters.

== Discography ==
- J.S. Bach: Goldberg Variations – 2014 Decca
- Beethoven: Piano Sonatas Nos. 30, 31, 32 – 2013 Decca
- Chopin: Maria Perrotta plays Chopin (Live, 2014) – 2015 Decca
- Schubert: Sonatas D784 & 960 – Grazer Fantasy D605A – 2017 Decca
- J.S. Bach: The Art of Fugue – 2026 EnPhases
