= Sabine Grofmeier =

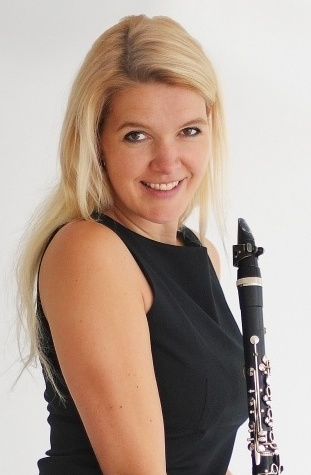
- Sabine Grofmeier in 2020
- Born: 4 April 1973 (age 53); Marl, North Rhine-Westphalia
- Education: Hochschule für Musik Detmold; University of Music and Performing Arts Graz; Saar University of Music
- Occupation: Clarinetist

Sabine Grofmeier (born 4 April 1973) is a German classical clarinetist. She performs as a soloist in orchestral music and as a chamber musician in Germany and several other countries.

== Education ==
Sabine Grofmeier studied the clarinet with Hans-Dietrich Klaus and Frits Hauser at the Hochschule für Musik Detmold from 1991 to 1996, graduating with a diploma in music education. From 1996 to 1999, she studied with Stefan Schilling at the University of Music and Performing Arts Graz, where she passed her Künstlerische Reifeprüfung in 1999. She then pursued further studies with Eduard Brunner at the Saar University of Music. She also attended masterclasses with, among others, Sabine Meyer, Wolfgang Meyer, and Ralph Manno. In 1996, she received the Advancement Award from the Society for the Promotion of Westphalian Cultural Work in Münster; she was a scholarship recipient of the Villa Musica Foundation of the State of Rhineland-Palatinate, the Richard Wagner Society, the Schwetzingen Festival, and the German Academic Exchange Service (DAAD).

== Career ==
As a solo clarinetist, Grofmeier has performed with, among others, the Junge Deutsche Philharmonie, the Philharmonie der Nationen and the Klassische Philharmonie Bonn under conductors such as Hans Zender, Justus Frantz and Semjon Bytschkow. One piece regularly performed is Carl Maria von Weber's "Grand Duo Concertante".

Near Kaiserslautern, Grofmeier founded the Diemersteiner Konzertreihe chamber music series. She lived in Mallorca for many years and directed the Capdepera International Music Festival there.

As a soloist, Sabine Grofmeier has performed at venues including the Hamburg Musikhalle (Laeiszhalle), Bremen Die Glocke, Berlin Konzerthaus am Gendarmenmarkt, Hanover Großer NDR-Sendesaal, Bielefeld Rudolf-Oetker-Halle, Karlsruhe Kongresszentrum, Nuremberg Meistersingerhalle, Bonn Beethovenhalle, Stuttgart Liederhalle, and Munich Herkulessaal der Residenz. Her concert activities as a chamber musician, soloist, and teacher have taken the clarinetist throughout Germany, Austria, Switzerland, Israel, England, Spain, Sweden, Turkey, Kosovo, France, Australia, and South America.

Grofmeier taught as a lecturer at, among other places, the Villa Denis Foundation House of the Technical University of Kaiserslautern and the Joseph Joachim Conservatory Dortmund. The Goethe-Institut Mexiko repeatedly invited her to Central and South America to lead masterclasses for young musicians at an orchestra academy, such as in 2012 with the Central American Youth Orchestra in El Salvador.

As a soloist, she has recorded well-known works by composers such as Mozart, Schumann, and Weber, as well as some rarities. These include clarinet studies by Carl Baermann and, most recently, the clarinet concerto by Ignaz Pleyel. Furthermore, in January 2016, the radio station WDR3 recorded a live chamber concert with Grofmeier as part of their "concerto discreto" series. She has performed in Hamburg as part of the Hamburg Serenade Concerts. In 2025, she was honoured by being made a patron of Marl debut. She performed a concert in her hometown.

== Personal life ==
Grofmeier lives in Hamburg.

== Discography ==
- Berg, Fromm-Michaels, Messiaen, Schumann & von Weber. Mit Tra Nguyen, Klavier (Verlag GWK Münster; 2007)
- Sabine Grofmeier – Clarinet Tales: Schumann Romanzen op. 94, Weber Silvana Var. op. 33, Winding, Reinecke, Reissiger. Mit Tra Nguyen, Klavier (ARS Production; 2010)
- Berg, Fromm-Michaels, Messiaen, Schumann & von Weber (2014)
- Baermann: Complete Studies for Clarinet, op. 64. Mit Ulugbeg Palvanov, Klavier (Menuetto Classics; 2015)

=== Appears on ===
- 20 Basics: The Clarinet. Various artists (2015)
- I Like the Clarinet!. Various artists (2015)
- The Night in Classical Music. Various artists (2018)
- Se va el tren. Hamburg Tango Quintet (2021)
