= Jean Rivier =

French composer (1896–1987)

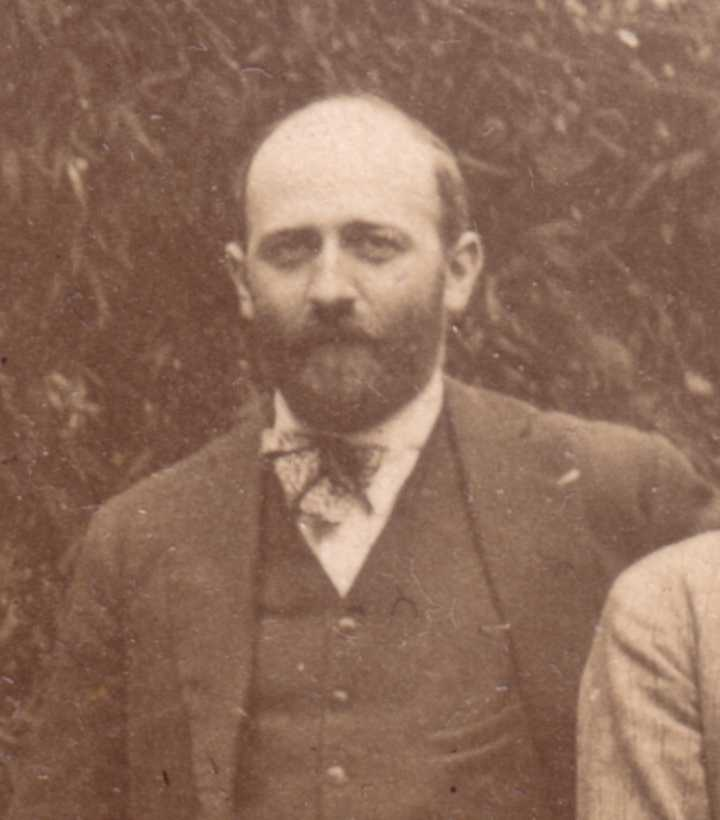
Jean Rivier

Alexis Fernand Félix Jean Rivier (21 July 1896 – 6 November 1987) was a French composer of classical music in the neoclassical style.

The son of Henri Rivier, a co-inventor of Armenian paper, he composed over two hundred works, including music for orchestra, chamber groups, chorus, piano, and solo instruments.

Rivier served as professor of composition at the Paris Conservatory from 1948 until his retirement in 1966. During the period 1948–1962, he shared this position with composer Darius Milhaud. Three of his notable students at the Paris Conservatory were Gareth Walters, Pedro Ipuche Riva, and Gerd Boder. See: List of music students by teacher: R to S#Jean Rivier.

== Quote ==
Jean Rivier (1896–1987), a twentieth-century French composer of the neo-classical school, is remembered primarily for his flute compositions. However, this prolific composer was extremely active in French musical circles from the period after World War I until his death. He composed over two hundred works, including symphonies, chamber music, concertos, choral music, piano works, music for solo instruments, and accompanied songs. For fourteen years, he shared with Darius Milhaud a position as Professor of Composition at the Paris Conservatory, and continued as sole professor from 1962 until his retirement in 1966. Rivier was a founding member of Triton, a musical society that promoted new music, and he was associated extensively with the French Radio (ORTF). Despite his successful career, Rivier's music was often eclipsed by the increasingly avant-garde compositions of more progressive French composers. Rivier's songs are best represented by his twenty-nine published mélodies or poèmes, notable for their brevity, attention to detail, and their lyrical melodies, tonal harmonies with creative dissonances, and carefully structured forms (especially ABA forms). With music set to poems by Guillaume Apollinaire, Henri Mahaut, Arthur Rimbaud, Pierre de Ronsard, Clément Marot, Joachim du Bellay, René Chalupt, and Paul Gilson, the songs are characterized by quartal and quintal harmonies, modality, polychords, parallelism, contrasting moods, and expressive emotions.

— The published songs of Jean Rivier

== Compositions ==
- 3 Points Seches for piano
- 4 Fantasmes for piano
- 4 Sequences Dialogues (need instrumentation)
- Alternances for piano
- Andante espressivo ed allegro burlesco (three movements) for clarinet and piano
- Aria for trumpet (or oboe) and organ
- Brillances for 2 trumpets, 2 French horns, 2 trombones and 1 tuba
- Capriccio (need instrumentation)
- Comme une tendre berceuse for flute and piano
- Concerto (arranged by Rene Decouais) (need instrumentation)
- Concerto for alto saxophone, trumpet and string orchestra (1955)
- Concerto for alto saxophone, baritone saxophone, 2 bassoons, trumpet, double bass
- Concerto for bassoon and strings (1963)
- Concerto for clarinet and string orchestra (1958)
- Concerto for flute and piano
- Concerto for oboe and orchestra (or piano) (1966)
- Concerto for trumpet and strings
- Concerto #1 in C for piano and orchestra (1940)
- Concerto Brève for piano and strings (1953)
- Concertino for saxophone and orchestra (or piano)
- Concertino for viola and orchestra (1947)
- Déjeuner sur l'herbe (need instrumentation)
- Doloroso et giocoso for viola and piano (1969)
- Duo for flute and clarinet in B♭
- Espagnole for violin and piano
- Grave et presto for saxophone quartet
- Nocturne, his contribution to Variations sur le nom de Marguerite Long
- Le petit gondolier for piano
- Les trois "S" for clarinet
- Oiseau tendre for solo flute
- Ouverture pour une opérette imaginaire
- 3 Pastorales for Orchestra (1929)
- Petite suite (for oboe, clarinet & bassoon, 1934)
- Piece in D (Pièce en Ré pour contrebasse et piano, 1920)
- Pour des mains amies for piano
- Prière (need instrumentation)
- Quatuor à cordes No. 1 (String Quartet No. 1) (1924)
- Quatuor à cordes No. 2 (1940)
- Rapsodie for trombone and piano
- Requiem (need instrumentation)
- Sonate for piano
- Sonatine for flute and piano (1946)
- Stridences for piano
- String Trio
- Symphony No. 1 (1931)
- Symphony No. 2 in C major for string orchestra (1937)
- Symphony No. 3 in G major for string orchestra (1937)
- Symphony No. 4 in B-flat major for string orchestra (1947)
- Symphony No. 5 in A minor (1950)
- Symphony No. 6 in E minor "Les Présages" (1958)
- Symphony No. 7 in F major "Les Contrastes" (1971)
- Symphony No. 8 for string orchestra (1978)
- Torrents for piano
- Trois mouvements for clarinet and piano
- Virevoltes for flute

His complete piano works have been published in one volume by Salabert.

== Discography ==
- Concerto for Alto Saxophone, Trumpet and Orchestra appears on French Saxophone Concertos, Naxos 8.225127; and on Virtuose Saxophonkonzerte, Koch Schwann
- Oiseaux tendres appears on Manuela Wiesler: Flute Music Naxos BIS-CD-689
- String Quartets Nos 1 and 2, Mandelring Quartett. Audite 97.710 (2021)
- Symphonies No. 3 in G, No. 4 in B♭, and No. 8 (all for strings) Calmel Chamber Orchestra conducted by Bernard Calmel, on Pavane CD ADW 7328 (1994) (currently out of print)
