= Peter Gilbert (composer) =

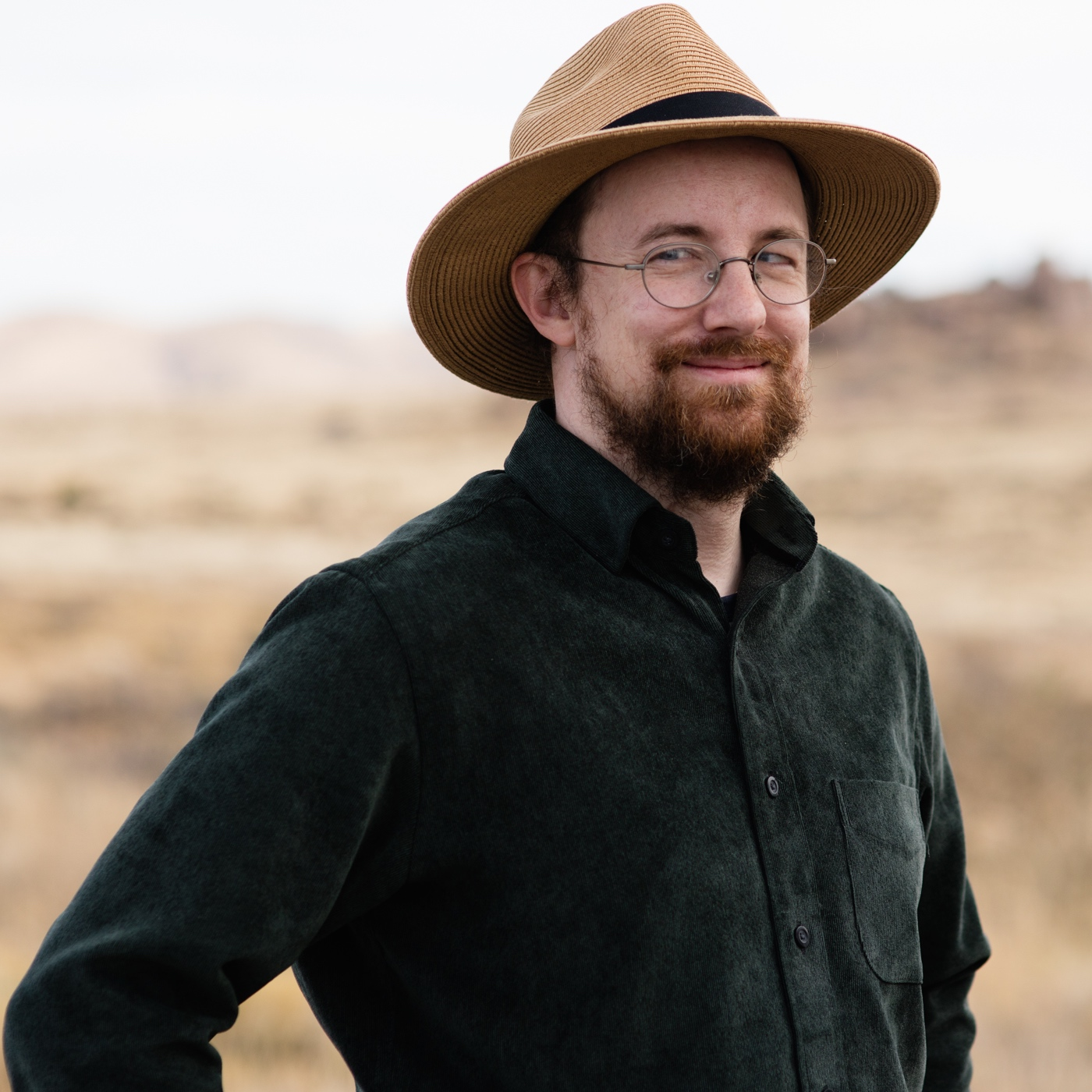
- Born: December 23, 1975 (age 50); Louisville, Kentucky, United States
- Occupations: Composer and teacher of music composition
- Website: www.petergilbert.net

Peter Gilbert (born December 23, 1975) is an American composer and teacher of music composition.

== Biography ==
Gilbert did his doctorate in composition at Harvard University with Bernard Rands and Mario Davidovsky as well as Joshua Fineberg and Hans Tutschku and worked with Chaya Czernowin, Helmut Lachenmann and Magnus Lindberg. He also studied at Illinois Wesleyan University with David Vayo and at the Cleveland Institute of Music with Margaret Brouwer.

He has taught at Wellesley College, Northeastern University, the Cleveland Institute of Music, Case Western Reserve University, UMass-Dartmouth and Harvard University. In 2003 he founded the Cleveland Institute of Music's summer composition course, the Young Composers Program at CIM with Orianna Webb. They served as artistic directors and faculty until 2010. Since 2010, Gilbert has been one of the directors of the composition program at the University of New Mexico. Gilbert is a winner of the Barlow Prize, the Look and Listen Prize and a Siemens Music Foundation grant.

Gilbert collaborates frequently with his wife, German composer Karola Obermueller. Their multi-media, live-electronic chamber opera dreimaldrei gleich unendlich has been performed in Germany and the United States, including a premiere as part of the Musik der Jahrhunderte festival in Stuttgart. A prize-winner at the National Opera Association awards, Dreimaldrei was selected for the Imagining Media exhibition celebrating the 20th anniversary of ZKM. They have created multiple interactive installation pieces including Listening to Mountains, and An Overlapping of Spaces, which combined a series of hanging surround-sound speaker arrays with unique iPod-based audience-interactivity. It was featured as a center-piece of the Perceiving Space in Art Gallery at the Davis Museum (Wellesley College) from 2008 to 2010 where it was chosen early on as an Artwork of the Month. They also worked together on Robert S., an opera with Theater Bonn. Gilbert and Obermueller teach together at the University of New Mexico and run the John Donald Robb Composers Symposium.

== Recordings ==
The first feature release of Gilbert's music was from New Focus Recordings entitled The Bold Arch of Undreamt Bridges. The May/June 2011 American Record Guide wrote of it: "Peter Gilbert's program is filled with the ghosts of sounds. He captures a dark, yet hopeful wonder through variation in color, mood, and the semblance of melodies. ...Everything here has the same kind of atmospheric, chromatic language with an absence of extreme dissonance. Resolutions are continually hidden just below the top layer of sound, and slow shifts in color are constantly changing the soundscape gradually." He has works on the following CDs:

- The Bold Arch of Undreamt Bridges
- Resonance, Daniel Lippel
- Sustenance, Daniel Lippel, Flexible Music, et al.
- Deviation, Boston Conservatory Wind Ensemble
- Third Practice
- Walk in Beauty, Emanuele Arciuli
- Impermanence, Lorelei Ensemble

He has also served as a producer for several New Focus Recordings releases.

== Writings ==
Gilbert has written a book called The Listen with Christopher Jon Honett which explores nine different experiences listening to nine extraordinary pieces of contemporary repertoire. Each piece inspires its own journey through idiosyncratic philosophical musings on creativity, listening and their connections to living. Trevor Hunter says of it: "What Honett and Gilbert are really engaging in here is a new type of criticism. ...The book outright doesn't accept the rarely spoken but widely held assumption that a high-ish level of musical training is needed to appreciate these works. But why it's subversive is that this completely undercuts the just-as-widely held and far-more-frequently spoken accusations that new music is abstrusely elitist, forever trapped in some sort of academic iron lung." He has also written for the online music journal Zeitschichten.

== Listening ==
- Revealing Distant Cities
- Trailer for Dreimaldrei Gleich Unendlich
- Songs from the Tundra
