= Hochschule für Musik Saar =

Music conservatory in Saarbrücken, Germany

Coordinates: 49.2303°N 6.9978°E

University of Music Saarbrücken
- Hochschule für Musik Saar, Saarbrücken
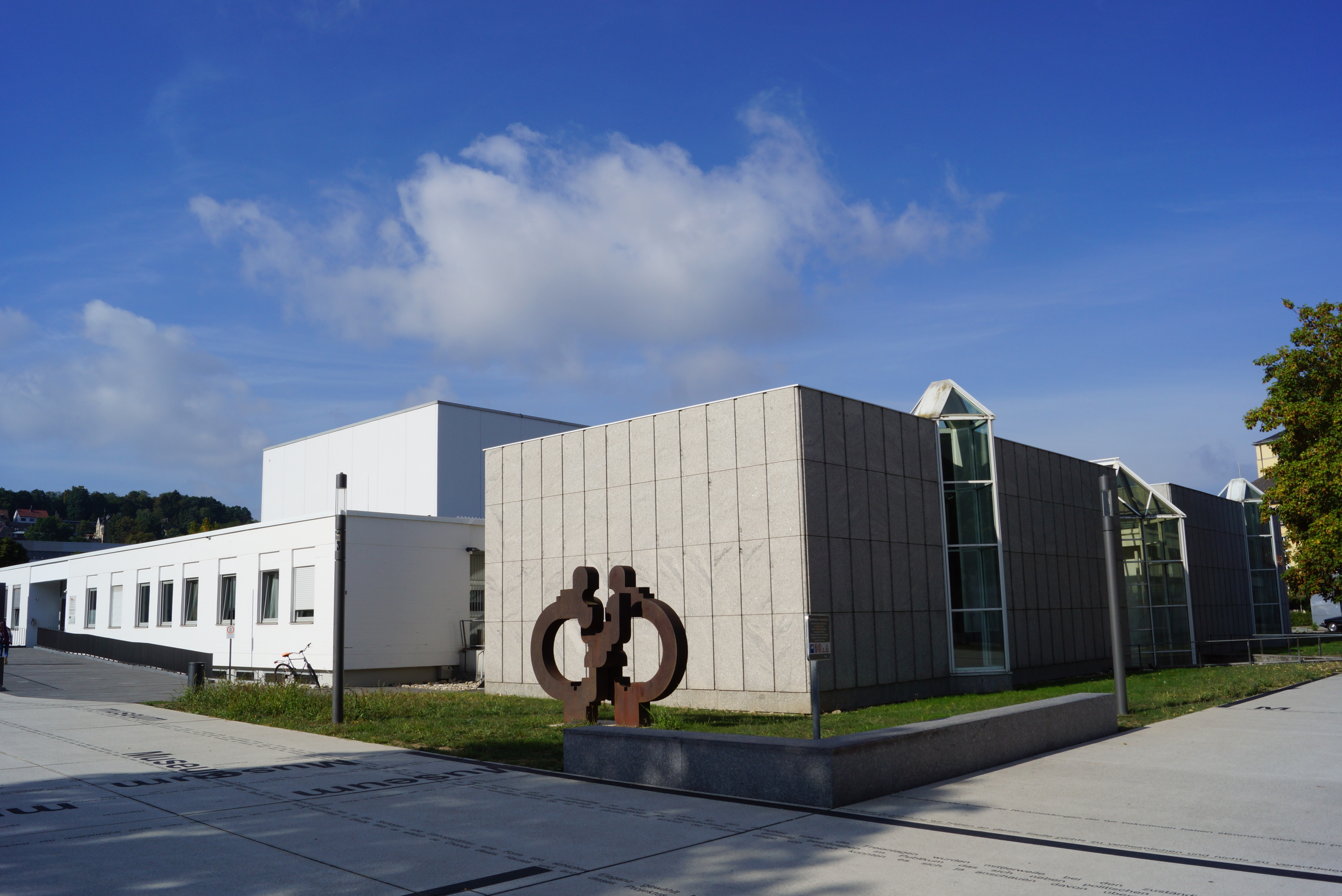
- Exterior of the school
- Former names: State Conservatory of Music (Staatliches Konservatorium Saarbrücken)
- Type: Public university
- Established: 1947
- Rector: Hans Peter Hofmann
- Administrative staff: 159
- Students: 463
- Location: Saarbrücken, Germany
- Website: www.hfmsaar.de

The Hochschule für Musik Saar is a conservatory of music in Saarbrücken, Germany and dates back to 1947. From 1994 until 2002, it was named Hochschule des Saarlandes für Musik und Theater (University of Music and Drama Saarbrücken). Since 2024, the rector is Prof. Hans Peter Hofmann. As of 2023, 463 students are enrolled and taught by 159 teachers in courses and classes for musicians and music teachers.

== History and Location ==
The Hochschule was founded in 1947 as "Staatliches Konservatorium Saarbrücken," following the model of the Conservatoire de Paris. In 1971, the Hochschule moved into the newly opened building at Bismarckstrasse near the city center. Three years later, a new organ by Klais Orgelbau for the main auditorium was dedicated. In 1988, an extension building was added to the existing main building. Following the establishment of a department offering drama classes in 1990, the Hochschule was renamed "Hochschule des Saarlandes für Musik und Theater" in 1994. After the closure of this department, the Hochschule was renamed into "Hochschule für Musik Saar" (University of Music) in 2002.

== Courses and Degrees ==
The Hochschule für Musik Saar offers bachelor's and master's degrees in the following areas:

- Sacred Music
- Music education
- Early childhood music education
- Cultural Institutions Studies
- Choral and Orchestra Conducting
- Music Theory
- Composition
- Chamber Music
- Jazz and Contemporary Music
- Performance Major (Keyboard instruments, orchestral instruments, voice)

== Notable alumni ==
- Martin Berger (Choral Conductor and University Professor)
- Gerd Boder (Composer)
- Franz Danksagmüller (Organist, Composer and University Professor)
- Helmut Freitag (Organist, Conductor and University Professor)
- Zeynep Gedizlioğlu (Composer)
- Sabine Grofmeier (Clarinetist)
- Alexandra Kertz-Welzel (Pianist and University Professor)
- Siegmund Nimsgern (Singer)
- Karola Obermueller (Composer)
- Caroline Peters (Actress)
- Peter Reulein (Organist)
- Wolfram Schmitt-Leonardy (Pianist and University Professor)
- Marc Schubring (Composer)
- Jonas Stark (Pianist)
- Martin Welzel (Organist, Musicologist and Academic Teacher)

== Notable faculty ==
- Tanja Becker-Bender (Professor of Violin 2006–2009)
- Walter Blankenheim (1926–2007; Professor of Piano 1963–1992)
- Theo Brandmüller (1948–2012; Professor of Composition, Musical Analysis and Organ Improvisation)
- Eduard Brunner 1939–2017; Professor of Clarinet 1992–2007)
- Vincent Dubois (Professor of Organ and Improvisation since 2022)
- Thomas Duis (Professor of Piano since 1998, Rector 2004–2012)
- Marc Engelhardt (Lecturer of Bassoon until 2004)
- Joshua Epstein (Professor of Violin 1978–2005)
- Andor Foldes (1913–1992; Professor of Piano 1957–1965)
- Irwin Gage (1939–2018; Professor of Piano Accompaniment 2001–2011)
- Martin Galling (Professor of Chamber Music 1970–2000)
- Walter Gieseking 1895–1956; Professor of Piano 1947–1956)
- Bernd Glemser (Professor of Piano 1989–1996)
- Georg Grün (Professor of Choral Conducting since 2012)
- Wilfried Gruhn (Lecturer of Music Education 1972–1973)
- Jean Guillou (1930–2019; Honorary Professor of Organ 2015–2019)
- Bernhard Haas (Lecturer of Organ 1989–1995)
- Matthias Handschick, Professor of Music Education since 2014
- Wolfgang Helbich (1943–2013; Visiting Professor of Choral Conducting 1995–1996)
- Arnulf Herrmann (Professor of Composition since 2014)
- Toshiyuki Kamioka (Professor of Conducting since 2004)
- Siegfried Köhler (conductor) (1923–2017; Professor of Conducting 1964–1974)
- Heinrich Konietzny (1910–1983; Professor of Composition, Orchestration, and Chamber Music)
- Kristin Merscher (Professor of Piano since 1990)
- Siegmund Nimsgern (Professor of Voice until 1997)
- Gustav Rivinius (Professor for Violoncello)
- Daniel Roth (Professor of Organ 1988–1995)
- Wolfgang Rübsam (Professor of Organ 1997–2011)
- Adolf Scherbaum (1909–2000; Professor of Trumpet 1964–1977)
- Jakob Stämpfli (1934–2014; Lecturer of Voice 1993–1969)
- Maxim Vengerov (Professor of Violin 2000–2005)
- Ruth Ziesak (Professor of Voice since 2008)
- Tabea Zimmermann (Professor of Viola 1987–1989)

== See also ==
- Saarland University
