= Wolfram Schmitt-Leonardy =

German classical pianist

Wolfram Schmitt-Leonardy (born 1967) is a German classical pianist and professor of piano.

== Life and career ==
Schmitt-Leonardy studied among others with Bernd Glemser, Michael Ponti, Adrian Aeschbacher, Vitaly Margulis, György Sebok and Alexis Weissenberg. He has won prizes at major pianist competitions such as for example the International Piano Competition Sergei Rachmaninoff and received cultural and sponsorship awards.

As a soloist he plays with renowned orchestras such as among others the Berliner Symphoniker, the Staatsphilharmonie Rheinland-Pfalz, the Saint Petersburg Philharmonic Orchestra, the Philharmonie der Nationen and the Philharmonia Hungarica and performs in major concert halls and festivals worldwide such as the Berlin Philharmonic Hall, St. Petersburg Philharmonic Hall, Teatro Olimpico, Adrian Arsht Center of the Arts Miami, Alte Oper Frankfurt, Forbidden City Concert Hall Beijing, Grand Canal International Lang Lang Piano Festival, Hangzhou.

He works among others with artists such as Wolfgang Emanuel Schmidt, Ingolf Turban, Guido Schiefen, Georg Friedrich Schenck, Maurizio Baglini, Michael Ponti and Tuncay Yılmaz as well as with the Philharmonia Quartet Berlin, the Melos Quartet, the Amati Quartet and the Rodin Quartet.

Since 2007 he has taught at the École Normale de Musique de Paris Alfred Cortot and since 2018 he has led a piano class at the International Piano Academy Brescia. From 2010 to 2017 he was Professor of Piano at the University of Music and Performing Arts Munich in 2016 he received a call to the Hanns Eisler Hochschule Berlin and in 2017 to the Hochschule für Musik und Darstellende Kunst Mannheim where he has since led a piano class. In 2020 he was appointed Vice Educational Director of the Lang Lang Art World in Hangzhou (China) and in 2022 Educational Director and Professor at the Académie du Bout du Monde Durtal.

He gives master classes among others for the Lang Lang International Music Foundation, for the Tonkünstlerverband Bayern, and at the invitation of various festivals and universities in Canada, Russia, Italy, France, Austria, Germany, Romania, Poland, Finland, Spain, Japan, China, Malaysia and Thailand. He is also jury Member of international piano competitions e.g. the international German Piano Award Frankfurt, Concours International de Piano d'Epinal, International Lang Lang Piano Competition.

== Awards ==
- 1987: Walter Gieseking Competition Saarbrücken (2nd prize and special prize)
- 1988: International Piano Competition Carlo Soliva (1st prize and special prize)
- 1991: European Music Competition Turin (3rd prize)
- 1993: International Piano Competition Sergei Rachmaninoff (2nd prize)
- 1994: International Competition for Piano and Orchestra in Sicily (3rd prize)
- 1994: Scholarship of the state capital Saarbrücken
- 1997: Art Prize of the District of Saarlouis
- 1998: International Piano Competition in Pietrà Ligure (1st prize)
- 2007: Coup de Cœur (Piano Le Magazine)

== Recording ==
- Domenico Scarlatti: 17 Sonatas (Audio-CD 2022)
- Frédéric Chopin: 3 Sonatas (Audio-CD 2017)
- Frédéric Chopin: 4 Ballades and 4 Impromptus (Audio-CD 2015)
- Frédéric Chopin: 24 Préludes Op. 28 and 2nd Sonata Op. 35 (Audio-CD 2012)
- Felix Mendelssohn Bartholdy: Mendelssohn: Piano Works (Audio-CD – 2009)
- Robert Schumann: Schumann: Piano Works Vol. 3 (2 Audio CDs – 2008)
- Sergei Rachmaninoff/Alexander Warenberg: Rachmaninoff/Warenberg: Klavierkonzert No. 5 (Audio-CD – 2008)
- Johannes Brahms: Brahms: Complete Variations (2 Audio CDs – 2007)
- Robert Schumann: Schumann: Piano Works – SACD (Audio-CD – 2007)
- Dimitri Kabalewsky: Kabalewsky Piano Solo Works (Audio-CD – 2002)
- Peter Tschaikowsky/George Gershwin: Klavierkonzert 1, B-Moll/Rhapso (Audio-CD – 2000)
