= Heinrich Konietzny =

German musician, professor and composer (1910-1983)

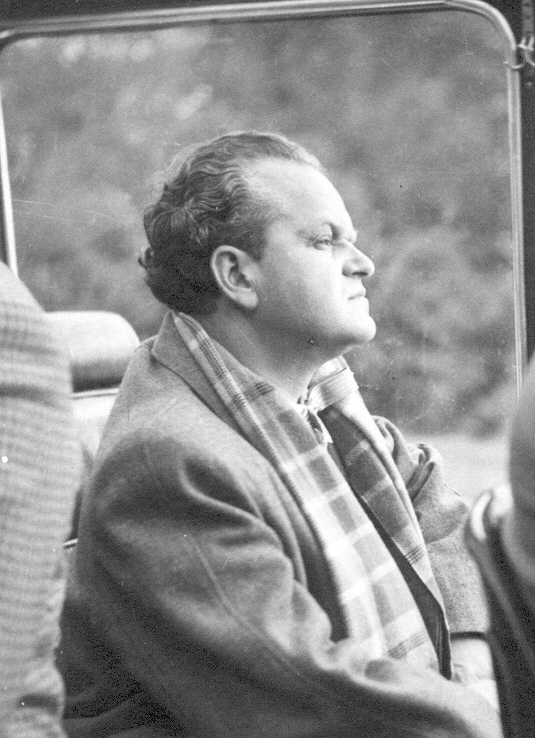
Heinrich Josef Konietzny, 1954

Heinrich Josef Konietzny (born 7 May 1910 in Gliwice; died 23 April 1983 in Saarbrücken-Dudweiler) was a German musician, professor and composer.

== Life ==
Heinrich Konietzny was born as the son of a Prussian Silesian military officer and socialist mayor. He gathered his first musical experiences on the mandolin, in singing and playing percussion instruments. At the age of eight he began his studies on the violin. Nine years old, he became student of the Konvikt of Bad Ziegenhals, where he chanted in a choir and received his first systematic education in music theory. He studied composition in Berlin in the class of Paul Hindemith. Since 1936 he played the bassoon in the symphonic orchestra of the Reichssender Saarbrücken (today: Saarländischer Rundfunk). 1947 he became an instructor at the Konservatorium Saarbrücken (University of Music Saarbrücken, today: Hochschule für Musik Saar). He was leader of the master class for composition, instrumentation and chamber music. He wrote six symphonies and a wealth of scores for radio plays and movies. Additionally he composed works for plucked string instruments in which he developed new sounds and ways to express musical ideas on these instruments. The documentary motion picture "Neue Musik" (Contemporary Music), directed by Manfred Heikaus and produced by the Saarländischer Rundfunk in the 60's gives insight in the creative work of the composer.

== Musician ==
Konietzny received his first violin lessons in the year 1918. At the age of 17 he became concert master in the so-called Kurorchester of Bad Kudowa. In the year 1929 he became concert master of the Silesian Philharmonic Orchestra. A broken left hand after an accident finished his career as a violinist in 1930. Following the advice of Hindemith, he began to study the bassoon in the same year. In the years from 1933 to 1936 he played the bassoon in several professional orchestras. From 1936 to 1939 he held a permanent position as solo bassoon player in the radio orchestra of the Reichssender Saarbrücken (today: Saarländischer Rundfunk). In the years 1939–1945 he had to join the German army in World War II. In 1946 he became first bassoon player in the symphony orchestra of the radio station of Saarbrücken (Saarländischer Rundfunk). He held this position until 1964. Parallel to this activity he also conducted a woodwind ensemble of the same orchestra.

== Composer ==
Today, Konietzny is best known as a composer. Beginning in the year 1930 he studied composition in the class of Paul Hindemith at the University of Music Berlin, Germany. (Staatliche Musikhochschule Berlin). 1934 Konietzny met Hugo Distler who had a major impact on Konietzny's style of composing. From 1949 to 1975, Konietzny was the main composer and lector of the radio station of Saarbrücken.

Konietzny was very productive (approx. 500 to 600 pieces of music). His work is differentiated and has been performed in a multitude of countries: Six symphonies, one percussion symphony, several string quartets, 25 concertos, chamber music for a great variety of instruments – often in quite unusual combinations (e.g. voice and percussion), several pieces of ballet music, more than 300 scores for movies and radio plays and about 200 songs and cantatas. For several songs Konietzny also wrote the lyrics. Beside of that, he composed numerous works for amateur musicians: pieces for accordion, woodwind and brass instruments and about 40 compositions for plucked strings. Up till now, a complete index of Konietzny's works doesn't exist. He used not to number his works and a lot of autographs are lost. Therefore, the total number of Konietzny's works can only be estimated. 42 autographs are collected in the Landesarchiv Saarbrücken in Saarbrücken, Germany. Konietzny's works have been published by the following (mostly German) companies: Bärenreiter, Boosy&Hawkes, Edition Modern, Gering, Junne, Köbl, Piwa&Wolf, Sandvoss, Simrock, Schott, Trekel, Vogt&Fritz, Wunn, Zimmermann.

Konietzny premieres have been conducted by:

- Rudolf Michl
- Philipp Wüst
- Paul Angerer
- Bruno Maderna
- Wolfgang Sawallisch
- Siegfried Köhler
- Antonio Janigro
- Siegfried Behrend
- Marcel Wengler

Well known dedicatees or interpreters of Konietzny's works have been:

- Maurice Gendron
- Siegfried Palm
- Max Strub
- Siegfried Fink
- Robert Leonardy
- Hans and Kurt Schmitt
- Norio Oshima
- Takashi Ochi
- Wilhelm Werner

== Professor at the University of Music Saarbrücken ==
In 1947 Konietzny attained a teaching position for composition, instrumentation and chamber music (woodwind instruments) at the University of Music Saarbrücken (Konservatorium Saarbrücken, today: Hochschule für Musik Saar). He became a full professor in 1963.

Well known former students of Heinrich Konietzny include:

- Manfred Kelkel
- Clemens Kremer
- Gerd Boder
- Heinz Martin Lonquich
- Peter Hoch
- Marcel Wengler

== Awards and prizes ==
- 1952: International composition price Radio Luxembourg for his concerto for strings and timpani
- 1959: Artist prize of the Saarland, Germany. (Kunstpreis des Saarlandes)
- 1962: Villa Massimo fellowship
- 1970: honorable member of the Bund für Zupf- und Volksmusik Saar, Germany
- 1972: honorable member of the Bund deutscher Zupfmusiker, Germany
- 1975: Saarland Order of Merit, Germany. (Saarländischer Verdienstorden)
- 1975: Johann-Wenzel-Stamitz-Staatspreis, Stuttgart, Germany

== Works ==
- Heinrich Konietzny: 13 Lieder für eine Singstimme und Klavierbegleitung (13 songs for voice and piano). With a foreword by Joseph Müller-Blattau. Schneider, St. Ingert (Germany) 1954.
- Heinrich Konietzny: Die Toten von Parga. Dramatische Kantate (The Dead of Parga. Dramatic cantata). Libretto by Karl Christian Müller. Meister, Heidelberg (Germany) 1963.
- Heinrich Konietzny: Triade für Xylophon, Vibraphon, Marimbaphon und drei Becken (Triad for xylophone, vibraphone, marimba and three cymbals). Schott, Mayence (Germany) 1973
- Heinrich Konietzny: CD + Booklet. Fono-Schallplatten-Gesellschaft, Laer (Germany) 1994. Recordings: Saarländischer Rundfunk (Saarland broadcasting station) 1962–1994. Interpretation: Saarländisches Zupforchester (Saarland Plucked String Orchestra)
- Heinrich Konietzny: Concerto for speaking voice, viola, guitar, organ, percussion and strings. LP disk. Interpreters: Men's Choir 1902 Dillingen Saar, Rundfunk-Sinfonieorchester Saarbrücken (Symphonic Orchestra of the Saarland Broadcasting Station). TELDEC Telefunken-Decca, Hamburg (Germany) 1965. Editor: Association of friends of contemporary Music (Vereinigung der Freunde zeitgenössischer Musik, Saarbrücken) in collaboration with the Saarland Broadcasting Station (Saarländischer Rundfunk).

== Bibliography (all texts in German) ==
- Ernst Meeß: Heinrich Konietzny. Musik aus der Zeit (Heinrich Konietzny. Music from the Time). In: Saarheimat (Germany). Vol. 1, 1957, p. 8.
- Karl Conrath: Commentary on the Awarding of the Artist Prize to Heinrich Konietzny. In: Saarheimat (Germany). 1959.
- Hans Bünte: Heinrich Konietzny. Musik als Bekenntnis (Heinrich Konietzny. Music as a confession). In: SR-Information (Germany). 1975, Vol. 5, p. 15.
- Horst-Dieter Veeck: Der Komponist Heinrich Konietzny (The composer Heinrich Konietzny). In: Saarheimat (Germany). Vol 34, 1990, pp. 50–51.
- Roland Kunz: Visionär und Pragmatiker. Der Komponist Heinrich Konietzny (Visionary and Pragmatic. The composer Heinrich Konietzny). In: Nike Keisinger, Ricarda Wackers (editors.): Musik in Saarbrücken. Nachklänge einer wechselvollen Geschichte (Music in Saarbrücken. Echos of a history rich of changes). Staden, Saarbrücken 2000, ISBN 3-935348-02-9.

== External links (texts in German) ==
- Short biography by Edwin Mertes. Includes a complete index of Konietzny's works for plucked string instruments. (PDF-file; 480 kB)
- Articles about Konietzny in the collection of Robert Hahn, PhD. (Institute for musicology, Saarland University, Germany).
