= Michael Tröster =

German classical guitarist (born 1956)

Michael Tröster (born 1956) is a classical guitarist from Germany.

Tröster studied under Gerhard Vogt before studying with Professor Heinz Teuchert, Dieter Kirsch, Konrad Ragossnig, and Siegfried Behrend at the music academies in Frankfurt, Würzburg and Basel.

In 1997 Tröster was a recipient of the Echo Classic award for musician of the year for his solo album El Decameron Negro. He won the Diapason d'Or prize in France the following year. He has gained renown for his recitals of Heitor Villa-Lobos and Miguel Llobet, having recorded all of their major works, and he has won the Villa-Lobos-Contest Milano. He has released over 40 CDs, mainly Villa-Lobos and Llobet recordings, but he has also recorded Conciertos para Guitarra with the Warsaw Symphony Orchestra, and won acclaim for his recital of Joaquin Rodrigo's "Concierto de Aranjuez".

Tröster has been teaching at the Musikakademie Kassel since 1986. He also often performs in a duo setting (Duo Capriccioso) with his wife Gertrud Tröster, or with chamber musicians, or orchestra. He has toured Europe, the United States, Canada, Israel, Jordan, Egypt, Saudi Arabia, United Arab Emirates, Laos, Thailand, Brunei, Korea, Japan, New Zealand, and Australia.
