= Mwatabu S. Okantah =

American writer

Mwatabu S. Okantah (born August 18, 1952 in Newark, New Jersey, United States) is an American poet, essayist, professor, and vocalist.

== Life and career ==
Born Wilbur Thomas Smith in 1952 in Orange, New Jersey, he was raised in Vauxhall, NJ, and graduated from Union High School (Union Township) in 1970. He holds a B.A. degree in English and African Studies from Kent State University (1976), where he studied with Halim El-Dabh and Fela Sowande. He earned a M.A. in creative writing from the City College of New York in 1982.

He has said of his name change during the 1970s: "I made this decision after having been introduced to Richard Wright's Native Son, and The Autobiography of Malcolm X during the spring of my freshman year at the university. Reading those books literally changed my life. I changed my name because my study of the African experience in America affected me - quite to my surprise - on a very profound and personal level.” His chosen surname, Okantah, means "breaker of rock" in the Ga language of Ghana. "Mwatabu" is Swahili for "born in a time of tribulation or sorrow."

He is currently a Professor and Chair of the Department of Africana Studies at Kent State University, and also serves as the Director of that university's Ghana Study Abroad Program.

He is the lead vocalist with the Muntu Kuntu Energy Ensemble and has performed frequently with the Cavani String Quartet and with Vince Robinson and the Jazz Poets of Cleveland, Ohio.

== Bibliography ==
- (1977) To Sing a Dark Song. Beachwood, Ohio: Sharaqua Pub. Co.
- (1983) Afreeka Brass. Cleveland, Ohio: Cleveland State University Poetry Center.
- (1984) Collage: Poems. Detroit, Michigan: Lotus Press.
- (1987) Legacy: for Martin & Malcolm
- (1997) Cheikh Anta Diop: Poem for the Living. Philadelphia, Pennsylvania: Black History Museum, UMUM/LOH Publishers.
- (2004) Reconnecting Memories: Dreams No Longer Deferred. Trenton, New Jersey: Africa World Press.
- (2013) Muntu Kuntu Energy: New and Selected Poetry. Indianapolis, Indiana: Charter House Press.
- (2019) Guerrilla Dread: Poetry for Hearts and Minds. Trenton, New Jersey: Africa World Press.
