= Marc Schubring =

German composer (born 1968)

Marc Schubring (born 13 April 1968 in Berlin) is a German composer.

Marc Schubring was born in Berlin, studied composition with Theo Brandmüller at the University of the Saarland, was Head of Theatrical Music at the Theater Saarbrücken from 1994 to 1999 and is a member of the BMI Lehman Engel Musical Theatre Workshop, New York and the Dramatists Guild of America.

He has been associated with the author Wolfgang Adenberg since 1990 in a productive collaboration which has given birth to two of the most frequently produced German-language musicals: Fletsch – Saturday Bite Fever (1993, book: Holger Hauer) and Emil und die Detektive, which was premiered at the Theater am Potsdamer Platz in Berlin in 2001. The partnership also created Cyrano de Bergerac (1995, revised 2009), Moulin Rouge Story (2008), Der Mann, der Sherlock Holmes war (2009), Tell (2012, book: Hans Dieter Schreeb) and Zum Sterben schön (2013). Most recently, the latest Schubring-Adenberg musical, »Pünktchen und Anton« after Erich Kästner, was given its first performance at the Junges Theater Bonn in September 2014.

In 2000 Marc Schubring wrote the chamber opera nimmerlandmensch based on texts by Birger Sellin, and in 2003 he adapted the music of Das Feuerwerk by Paul Burkhard for the Burgtheater in Vienna, for which he also created the arrangements. For the Friedrichstadt-Palast in Berlin, he produced compositions for the review Rhythmus Berlin (2003) and the score for the children's review Der Zauberer von Camelot (2007, book/lyrics: Lutz Hübner). He wrote additional songs for the musical Friedrich – Mythos und Tragödie (2012) and for Kolpings Traum (2013). For the Koblenz Theatre, he created the music for the family musicals Das Dschungelbuch (2012) and Jim Knopf (2013). The Hanau Brothers Grimm Festival commissioned him to write the musical Aschenputtel (2014).

In addition, Marc Schubring regularly writes film music for feature films and documentaries for television stations such as ZDF, KiKa, WDR and arte. In 2015 he wrote musicals such as "Gefährliche Liebschaften (Dangerous Liaisons) for the Staatstheater am Gärtnerplatz in Munich, Der gestiefelte Kater (Puss in Boots) for Hanau and Double Trouble based on Kästner's Das doppelte Lottchen for Washington, D.C.
