= Vincent Dubois (organist) =

French organist (born 1980)

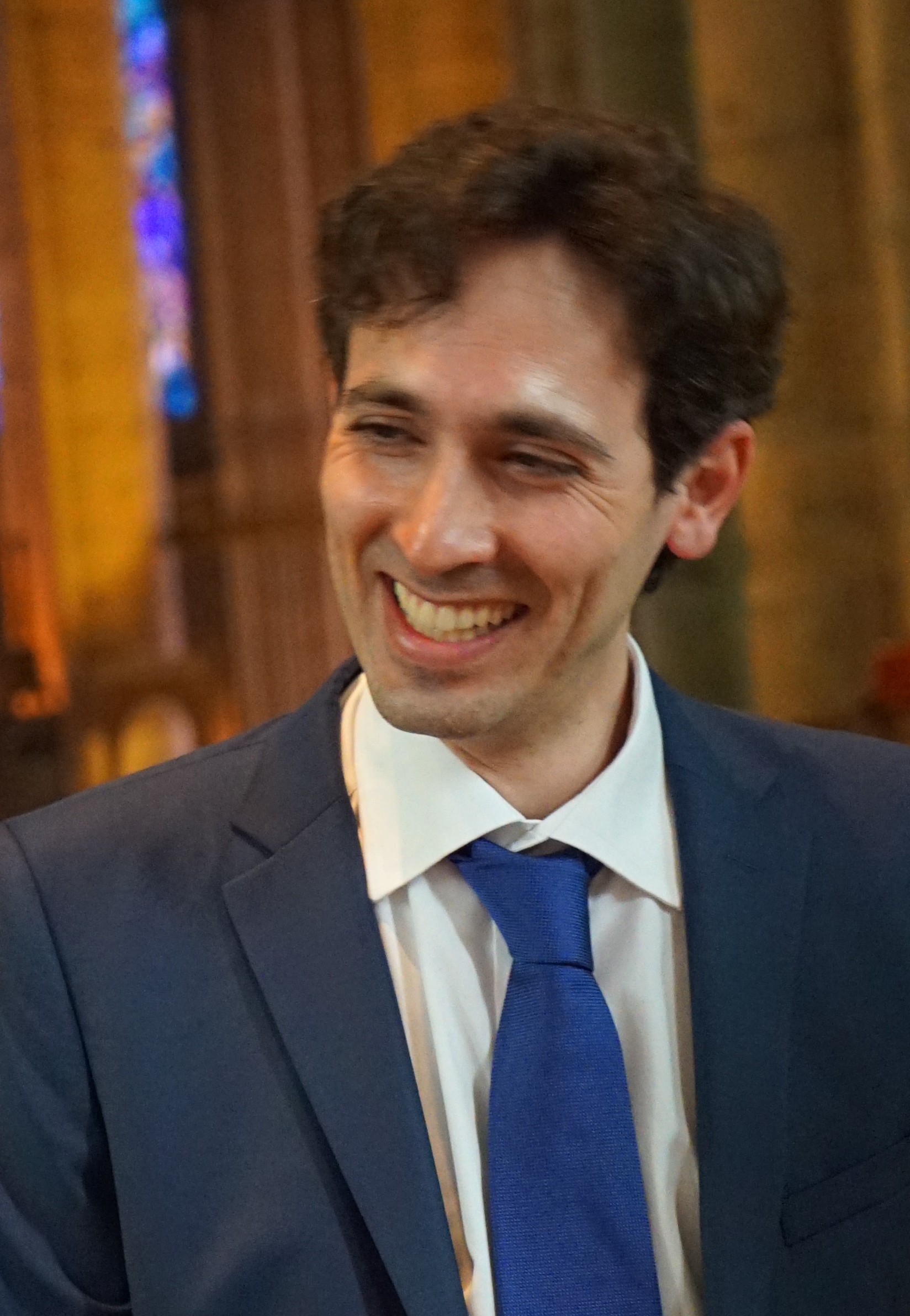
- Dubois in 2017
- Born: 1980 (age 45–46); Saint-Brieuc, France
- Education: Conservatoire de Paris
- Occupations: Organist; Improviser; Academic teacher
- Organizations: Notre-Dame de Paris; Hochschule für Musik Saar
- Predecessor: Jean-Pierre Leguay

Vincent Dubois (born 1980) is a French concert organist, titular organist at Notre-Dame de Paris. As a teacher, he has directed the Conservatoire à rayonnement régional in Strasbourg from 2011 and has been professor of organ and improvisation at the Hochschule für Musik Saar from 2022.

== Life and career ==
Dubois was born in Saint-Brieuc in 1980. He studied at the Conservatoire de Paris with Olivier Latry, earning first prizes in organ, harmony, counterpoint, fugue, and composition. In 2002 he won both the Calgary International Organ Competition, as the first French laureate, and the Xavier Darasse Competition in Toulouse.

He has played concerts internationally, also with orchestras such as the Philadelphia Orchestra, the Los Angeles Philharmonic Orchestra, the Orchestre Philharmonique de Radio France, the Orchestre National de France and the Orquesta Filharmónica de Gran Canaria.

In 1996 Dubois was appointed titular organist at the Cavaillé-Coll organ of the Saint-Brieuc Cathedral, and in 2001 he also became titular organist at the Soissons Cathedral. He has been director of the Conservatoire à rayonnement régional in Strasbourg from 2011. In January 2016 Dubois was appointed titular organist at Notre-Dame de Paris, succeeding Jean-Pierre Leguay, where he works with Latry and Philippe Lefebvre. They all played during the 2025 opening of the cathedral after restoration.

Dubois became professor of organ and improvisation at the Hochschule für Musik Saar in 2022. One of his students is Niklas Jahn. Bubois lives in Alsace.

== Recordings ==
- Dubois Plays Cavaille-Coll. Jav Recordings, 2010.
- Camille Saint-Saëns: 3 Symphonies. Cascavelle, 2009.
- Vierne: Organ Symphony No. 3 / Marcel Dupré: Trois Préludes et Fugues. Temperamen, 2008.
- Franz Liszt: Organ works. Vox Coelestis, 2006.
