= Bernd Glemser =

German musician

Bernd Glemser (born 1962, Dürbheim) is a German pianist. A student of Vitaly Margulis, in 1989 he became Germany's youngest piano professor at Saarbrücken's Musikhochschule.

Glemser has recorded major pieces by Rachmaninoff, Prokofiev, Schumann, Scriabin, and Tchaikovsky as well as pieces by Liszt, Tausig, Godowsky and Busoni. He has worked with numerous orchestras, including the Philadelphia Orchestra, Gewandhausorchester Leipzig, London Philharmonic Orchestra, Tonhalle-Orchester Zürich, Orchestra dell'Accademia Nazionale di Santa Cecilia, Sofia Philharmonic Orchestra, Polish National Radio Symphony Orchestra, RTÉ National Symphony Orchestra, Armenian National Philharmonic Orchestra, Belgrade Philharmonic Orchestra and Dortmund Philharmonic Orchestra. Conductors with whom he has collaborated include Herbert Blomstedt, Riccardo Chailly, Myung-whun Chung, Dmitri Kitayenko, Andrés Orozco-Estrada, Wolfgang Sawallisch, Muhai Tang, Franz Welser-Möst, Antoni Wit, Jerzy Maksymiuk, Eduard Topchjan, Mei-Ann Chen, Martin Panteleev, Alexei Kornienko, Nayden Todorov, Mateusz Molęda and Gabriel Feltz.

In 2003 Glemser was decorated with the Bundesverdienstkreuz.

His recording of Rachmaninoff's Piano Concerto No. 2 was featured in the 2007 film Spider-Man 3.

Record of piano prizes, incomplete
Year	Competition	Prize	1st prize winner / Ex-aequo with...
1983	(Spain) María Canals, Barcelona	2nd prize	1st prize void / (Japan) Kyoko Koyama
1984	(Italy) Ferruccio Busoni, Bolzano	3rd prize	(Canada) Louis Lortie
1984	(Italy) Mario Zanfi, Parma	1st prize	
1985	(Australia) Sydney International Piano Competition	2nd prize	(China) Du Ning-Wu
1986	(Italy) Rina Sala Gallo, Monza	1st prize	
1987	(West Germany) ARD, Munich	2nd prize	1st prize void / (Brazil) Ricardo Castro.
1987	(Spain) Paloma O'Shea Santander International Piano Competition, Santander	3rd prize	
1988	(Canada) Concours de Montreal	2nd prize	(Canada) Angela Cheng
1992	(Hungary) Andor Földes Prize	1st prize	
1993	(Europe) European Pianists Prize	1st prize	
