= Reinhard Kluth =

German church musician and composer (1950–2020)

Reinhard Theodor Kluth (31 July 1950 – 12 July 2020) was a German church musician and composer.

== Life ==
Born in Dülken, Kluth studied church music at the Robert Schumann Hochschule Düsseldorf. In 1976, he passed his exams, and in 1978 his artistic maturity examination. His teachers were Jürg Baur, Hans-Dieter Möller, Heinz Bernhard Orlinski, Friedemann Gottschick and Alberte Brun. He attended master class in choral and orchestral conducting for historical performance practice with Hermann Max. During his studies Kluth worked part-time as assistant organist at the Basilica of St. Vitus, Mönchengladbach with Viktor Scholz.

From 1978 to 1982, he was cantor at St. Michael, Mönchengladbach. From 1983 to 1985, he was cantor at St. Peter in Düsseldorf, and from 1986 to 1988 cantor at St. Michael, Wermelskirchen. From 1989 to 2001, Kluth was cantor at the church of St. Antonius in the Düsseldorf district of Friedrichstadt. He was a member of the Hermann Schroeder Society. From 2001 to 2013, he was pastoral area cantor of the Düsseldorf Pfarreiengemeinschaft Eller-Lierenfeld.

Kluth lived in Tübingen-Kilchberg from 2013 to 2016 as a freelance composer, church musician and music teacher; he was organist at St. Petrus and Pankratius in Tübingen and, since 2016, deputy cathedral organist in Rottenburg. In Tübingen-Bühl, he directed the choir community Bühl 1878 from 2015 to 2016. From 2016, he was director of the "Kleine Kantorei Tübingen", which he founded. From 1 October 2016 to 31 August 2018, he was collegiate church musician and organist of the Collegiate Church in Horb am Neckar.

Luth died in Tübingen at the age of 69.

== Prizes ==
- 1984: Preis der deutschen Schallplattenkritik
- 1996: Johann Wenzel Stamitz Prize
- 2013: Kompositionsstipendium der Stadt Düsseldorf

== Recordings ==
- Camillo Schumann: 6 Orgelsonaten
- Jürg Baur: Orgelwerke
- Louis James Alfred Lefébure-Wély: Ausgewählte Orgelwerke.
- Johann Krieger: Anmuthige Clavierübung.
- Sigfrid Karg-Elert: Sempre Semplice.
- Sigfrid Karg-Elert: Romantische Träumereien auf der Orgel. Transkriptionen romantischer Komponisten.
- Carl Sattler: Weihnachtliche Orgelromantik.
- Die Weimbs-Orgel der Pfarrkirche St.Peter in Zell/Mosel. Mit Werken von Torner, Bach, Ritter, Becker.
- Die Metzler-Orgel in St. Cyriakus, Krefeld-Hüls. Clemens Ingenhoven: Sämtliche Orgelwerke.
- Die Titz-Gilmann-Orgel der Kreuzherrenkirche zu Brüggen. Mit Werken barocker Komponisten.
- Franz Aumann: Missa in F; Chor- und Orgelwerke von Hiller, Rinck, Weber, Kluth, Kolb, Murschhauser and Jürg Baur; Ausführende: Cappella Cantabo, Parnass-Ensemble Düsseldorf, Ltg. Reinhard Kluth.
- Die Orgel der Barockkirche in Eckenhagen. Works by Händel, Bach, Schneider, Lucchesi, Michael Gotthard Fischer and Ernst Friedrich Richter.
- Samuel Scheidt: Das Orgelwerk. Vol. 1 (Fritzsche-Treutmann Orgel 1622/1728 of the Harbke castle)
