= Mathias Rehfeldt =

German composer and organist (born 1986)

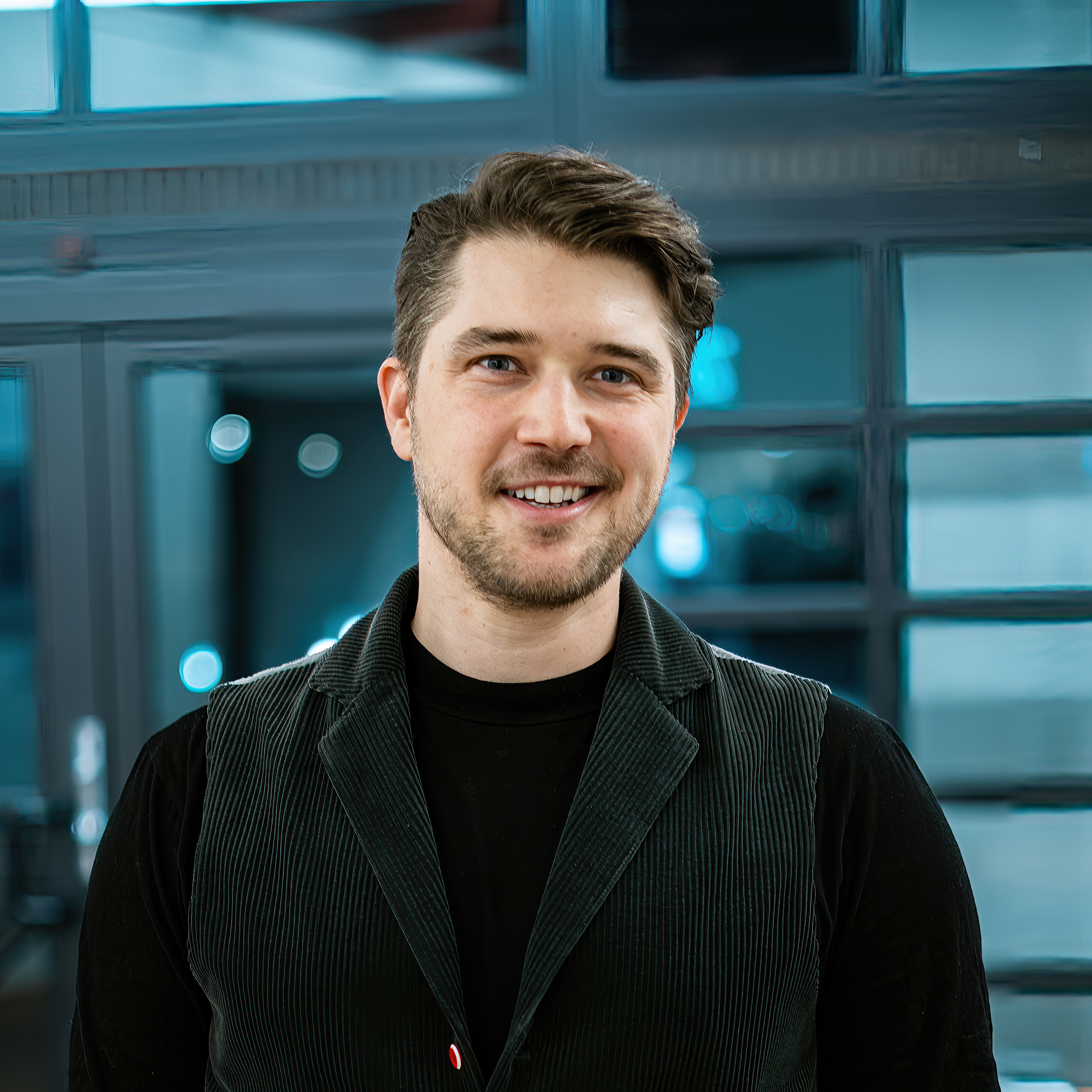
- Mathias Rehfeldt in 2024 at the premiere of his violin concerto Sinfonia Maris

Background information
- Born: August 25, 1986 (age 39); Tübingen, West Germany

Mathias Rehfeldt (born 25 August 1986 in Tübingen) is a German composer, music producer and organist working across film, television and contemporary concert music.

== Life ==
Mathias Rehfeldt initially studied Catholic church music in Rottenburg am Neckar before studying composition for film and media under Enjott Schneider at the Munich Academy of Music and Theatre. His output spans film scores as well as concert music. As an organist for silent-film concerts and with various original compositions he toured the United States, Canada and Germany. In 2015 he released his first EP, Nocturnal Bleedings, in which he combined electronic and classical music for the first time.

Earlier releases appeared in part under the pseudonym Gabriel Fawkes. In 2020 he began releasing piano music under the project name Fieldt.

In 2024 Nissan commissioned Rehfeldt to compose the soundtrack Electric Legacy for the ABB FIA Formula E World Championship, using artificial intelligence to integrate sounds of the Nissan Formula E race cars. Dedicated editions of the piece were created for individual race weekends — including Berlin, Tokyo, Misano, London and Monaco — and played continuously on the respective circuits during the events.

Recordings have appeared on labels including BSC Music, 22D Music, Genuine, Katermukke and Warner Music.

== INFINITUM ==
Under the name "INFINITUM" (formerly "Dark Matter Projekt") Rehfeldt has been touring since 2018 with a live programme that combines church organ and electronic music. Synthesizers and church organ are treated as equal sound bodies. Live the project is performed by Rehfeldt as a complete concept including extensive video projections. The project premiered in 2018 on the experimental Harder-Völkmann Organ in Gröbenzell.

== Social projects ==
Since 2020 Rehfeldt has been involved in several projects of the Archdiocese of Munich and Freising addressing the abuse scandals within the Catholic Church. In this context he composed the orchestral work Oratio, the music for Elisabeth Lutz's performance Here we are and music for the 2023 General Assembly of the Synodal Path ("verantwort:Ich"), commissioned by the German Bishops' Conference.

Together with the director Hans Steinbichler and the writer Albert Ostermaier, on behalf of the Bavarian State Ministry for Family, Labour and Social Affairs, he wrote the song "#BayernGemeinsamStark" as a counter-statement to societal polarisation and growing extremism.

== Filmography (selection) ==
Feature films

- 2016: Die Diva, Thailand und wir! (dir. Franziska Buch, BR)
- 2017: Der Zauberlehrling (dir. Frank Stoye, ZDF)
- 2018: Der süße Brei (dir. Frank Stoye, ZDF)
- 2018: Skrupellos – Gefangen im Netz der Macht (dir. Michel Morales, cinema)
- 2018: Walpurgisnacht – Die Mädchen und der Tod (dir. Hans Steinbichler, ZDF)
- 2019: Six in One Stroke – Die drei Königskinder (dir. Frank Stoye, ARD)
- 2020: Into the Beat (song "One Day", dir. Stefan Westerwelle, Netflix)
- 2021: 12 Tage Sommer (dir. Dirk Kummer, BR)
- 2022: Ein Taxi zur Bescherung (dir. Dirk Kummer, ARD)
- 2022: Die Gänseprinzessin (dir. Frank Stoye, ARD)
- 2022: Völlig meschugge?! (series, dir. Frank Stoye, ARD)

Short and festival films

- 2015: Ioana (dir. Simon Pfister, BR)
- 2015: Take my hand (dir. Maria Mayoral)
- 2017: Horizont (dir. Simon Pfister, BR)
- 2017: Gestrandet (dir. Kai Sitter)
- 2017: The Glasshouse (dir. Gianna Arni)
- 2018: A home for curiosities (dir. Ben Tobin)
- 2018: Intergalactical Chewing Gum (BR)
- 2018: Midnight Regulations (dir. Nils Keller)
- 2019: Beats (dir. Simon Pfister, BR)
- 2019: Der Andere (dir. Lukas Bayer, BR)
- 2020: Wie wir leben wollen (BR)
- 2021: Nahrani (dir. Simon Pfister, BR)
- 2022: Karma is a Hitch (dir. Oliver Kahl, BR)
- 2023: Iris Speaks (dir. Chris Hof)

Documentaries

Terra X (ZDF)

- 2015: Die Odyssee der einsamen Wölfe (2 parts)
- 2017: Abenteuer Karibik
- 2017: Abenteuer Pazifik
- 2018: 30 Jahre Krieg (2 parts)
- 2018: Der Wormser Dom
- 2018: Die Vermessung der Erde (2 parts)
- 2018: Feuer und Eis
- 2016: Der Große Anfang – 500 Jahre Reformation (3 parts)
- 2020: Abenteuer Freiheit Season 1 (3 parts)
- 2020: Abenteuer Namibia
- 2020: Abenteuer Vietnam
- 2020: Die Sonnenstadt der Pharaonen
- 2020: Kielings Wilde Welt (episodes 9–11)
- 2020: Magellans Reise um die Erde
- 2021: Faszination Universum – Im Bann der Technik
- 2021: Faszination Universum – Im Labyrinth des Wissens
- 2021: Nordamerikas versteckte Paradiese
- 2022: Dino-Jäger
- 2022: Abenteuer Freiheit Season 2 (3 parts)
- 2023: Kielings Wilde Welt (episodes 12–14)
- 2023: Schlaue Schwärme (2 parts)
- 2023: Abenteuer Amazonien
- 2024: Der Schatz des Piraten
- 2024: Abenteuer Freiheit Season 3 (3 parts)
- 2024: Kielings Wilde Welt (episodes 15–17)
- 2026: Verschollen
- 2026: Vergessenes Wissen (two episodes: Die Schätze der Natur, Das Erbe der Ahnen)

37 Grad (ZDF)

- 2014: Augen zu und durch
- 2015: Eltern auf Zeit
- 2016: Die Liebesformel
- 2016: Die Lüge meines Lebens
- 2018: Mehr als satt und sauber
- 2019: Keine Zeit für Tränen
- 2019: Wenn der Zufall Schicksal spielt
- 2020: Wie Eva Erben den Holocaust überlebte
- 2020: Schatten im Gleis
- 2021: Die Wütenden
- 2021: Ein Hauch von Leben – Sternenkinder und ihre Eltern
- 2023: Jung, begabt und seelisch krank
- 2023: Zerrissen bleibst du immer
- 2024: Bei Anruf Baby

Die Story im Ersten (ARD)

- 2019: Tuna on the road
- 2020: Die Akte Otto Warmbier
- 2020: Sassnitz gegen Trump
- 2021: Hass im Netz
- 2021: Unter Wählern
- 2023: Inside Rheinmetall
- 2024: Tatort Eckkneipe
- 2025: Die Spur der Tanker – Wer stoppt die russische Schattenflotte (dir. Klaus Scherer, Simon Hoyme)
- 2025: Wirtschaft im Stresstest (dir. Klaus Scherer)
- 2026: NDR Story: Reformstau, Zollkrieg, Inlandsflaute – Mit Mittelständlern durchs Krisenjahr (dir. Klaus Scherer)
- 2026: Unsichtbarer Angriff – Die russische Schattenflotte (dir. Klaus Scherer)

Other documentaries

- 2014: Das Antlitz Christi (2 parts, ARD)
- 2015: Mein Kampf – Programm eines Massenmörders (ARD)
- 2016: Sankt Martin (ARD)
- 2017: Triff Martin Luther (KIKA)
- 2018: Bayerns Weg zur Demokratie (2 parts, ARD)
- 2019: Verschleppt (ARD)
- 2020: Konzentrationslager Dachau (2 parts, ARD)
- 2022: Vergessene Königinnen: Die Herrin von Numana (Arte)
- 2023: Der Hitler Fake – Die Geschichte einer Jahrhundertfälschung (ZDF)
- 2023: Mauern der Freiheit (6 episodes, ARD/ORF)
- 2024: Belgien – Krabbenfischen mit Pferden (Arte)
- 2024: 24h D-Day (ARD)
- 2025: Robert Lembke – Wer bin ich?
- 2025: Der Dackel
- 2025: Das Rätsel einer verlorenen Zivilisation – Die verschwundene Metropole
- 2025: Meister der Apokalypse – Roland Emmerich (dir. Jo Müller, ARD)
- 2025: Die Farben von Neuengland
- 2025: Kolumbien (two parts, Arte)
- 2026: Die Pharaonin (NDR/Arte, prod. Caligari Film)
- 2026: Patagonien (two parts, dir. Joachim Walther, Arte)

== Concert music ==
Year	Composition	Instrument	Publisher	Premiered by	Venue
2025	4 Seasons for Hasty People	Chamber music	Commission	Matthias Well, Dominik Wagner, Tamás Pálfalvi et al.	Elbphilharmonie Hamburg
2025	Adventus	Organ	Commission	Andreas Sieling	Berlin Cathedral
2025	Infinitum	Organ, electronics	Commission	Mathias Rehfeldt	Lucerne
2025	Frühlingsdreher	Violin, cello, accordion	Commission	Trio Well-Caru	Prinzregententheater Munich
2025	3 Bird Pieces	Organ	Commission	Kirsten Sturm	St. Bonifaz, Munich
2024	Rottenburger Festouvertüre	Symphonic wind orchestra	Gift to the city of Rottenburg	Stadtkapelle Rottenburg	Rottenburg am Neckar
2024	Kein schöner Land	Choir	Commission	Markus Bauer – Dorfener Festspiele	Dorfen
2024	Gebet	Choir	Commission	Max Jenkings – Voicekamp	Warburg
2024	Lux Aurorae – Roratemesse	Choir, organ, electronics	Commission	Pater Thomas Möller	St. Andreas, Düsseldorf
2024	Sinfonia Maris	Violin concerto, symphonic wind orchestra	Commission	Michael Kummer	
2023	Northern Lights	Organ, electronics	Helbling Verlag	Manfred Grob	St. Marien, Dortmund
2023	6 choral pieces	Choir	Helbling Verlag	–	–
2023	Exodus	Organ (2×)	Commission	Ruben & Kirsten Sturm	Frauenkirche, Munich
2023	Lord, grant us peace	Choir (6 voices)	Commission	Maximilian Betz, Lamberti Scholars	Lambertikirche, Münster
2023	Festsuite (10th Munich Organ Summer)	Organ	Commission	various organists	Munich
2023	Verantwort:Ich	Electronics, organ, soprano	Commission	Andreas Boltz, Olga Surikova, Mathias Rehfeldt	Frankfurt Cathedral
2022	Ferne Erinnerung	Choir (8 voices)	Commission	Vokalensemble Stimmgold	Notti Sacre, Bari
2022	Here we are	Choir, orchestra, organ	Commission of the Archdiocese of Munich and Freising	Stellario Fagone, Ruben Johannes Sturm	Herz Jesu Church, Munich
2022	Vulnerable	Organ, cello, violin, accordion, bass	Commission of the Diocese of Rottenburg-Stuttgart	Ruben Sturm, Matthias Well, Maria Well, Dominik Wagner	St. Maria, Stuttgart
2022	Suite Divina Commedia	Organ	Helbling Verlag	Manfred Grob	St. Marien, Dortmund
2022	Suite Noel	Organ	Helbling Verlag	Tobias Schmid	St. Willibald, Munich
2022	Three Liquid Pieces	Organ	Helbling Verlag	Mathias Rehfeldt	Frauenkirche, Dresden
2022	Fieldt: Glimpse of Light	Piano	Helbling Verlag	Mathias Rehfeldt	
2021	Du wirst ein Kind empfangen	Organ	Helbling Verlag	Ruben Johannes Sturm	Frauenkirche (Munich)
2021	Es kommt ein Schiff geladen	Organ	Helbling Verlag	Willibald Guggenmos	St Gallen Cathedral
2021	Missa Dominici	Organ, electronics	Commission	Pater Thomas Möller OP	St. Andreas, Düsseldorf
2021	Suite Bohème	Organ	Helbling Verlag	Steffen Mark Schwarz	Martinskirche Ebingen / Moscow Conservatory
2021	Fieldt: Notion of Solitude	Piano	Helbling Verlag	Mathias Rehfeldt	
2021	Fieldt: Trace of Silence	Piano	Helbling Verlag	Mathias Rehfeldt	
2021	Fieldt: Noctuelles	Piano	Helbling Verlag	Mathias Rehfeldt	
2021	Aus tiefer Not / From deep affliction	Organ	Helbling Verlag	Konstantin Reymaier	St. Stephen's Cathedral, Vienna
2021	Nine liturgical "Cutscenes"	Organ	Helbling Verlag	Ruben Johannes Sturm	Rottenburg Cathedral
2020	Maria durch ein Dornwald ging	Organ	Helbling Verlag	Hans Leitner	Frauenkirche (Munich)
2020	Bourrasque de Neige	Violin and piano	Helbling Verlag	Matthias Well & Lilian Akopova	
2020	Oratio	Choir, orchestra, soloists	Helbling Verlag	Vokalkappelle of the Theatinerkirche, Munich	Theatine Church, Munich
2020	Schwarzer Wald	Choir	Helbling Verlag	Via-nova-chor Munich	Himmelfahrtskirche, Munich
2019	Jubilate	Organ	Helbling Verlag	Mathias Rehfeldt	Weggentalkirche
2019	Silva Nigra Suite	Organ	Helbling Verlag	Ruben Johannes Sturm	St. Blasius Cathedral
2019	Nostro Lumine	Organ	Helbling Verlag	Wolfram Rehfeldt	Rottenburg Cathedral
2019	Sonnengesang	Choir, organ & electronics	Commission	Martinskantorei Ebingen	Martinskirche Ebingen
2018	Totentanz	Violin & accordion	Helbling Verlag	Matthias Well & Zdravko Zivkovic	
2015	Into the Unknown	Large orchestra	Commission	Munich Symphony Orchestra	
2014	Von guten Mächten treu und still geborgen	Brass	Commission	blechimpuls (ensemble)	LMU Munich
2014	Du hüllst dich in Licht wie ein Kleid	Choir, organ	Helbling Verlag	Concentus Juvenum	St. Godehard, Hanover
2014	Sing Unto God	Choir, organ	Helbling Verlag	–	
2014	Meine Seele ist stille zu Gott	Choir, organ	Helbling Verlag	Concentus Juvenum	St. Godehard, Hanover
2013	Orgelintonationen zum neuen Gotteslob	Organ	Carus	–	
2013	Ein feste Burg ist unser Gott	Trombone choir	Commission	Posaunenchor Ulm	Pauluskirche Ulm
2012	Brass of Jericho	Brass	Commission	blechimpuls	Martin-Luther-Kirche, Ulm

== Awards (selected) ==
Year	Status	Award
2010	Winner	First Prize – International Organ Competition "Epinal", Category "Orgue Excellence"
2016	Winner	Special Mention – Film Music Competition "Maurice Ravel"
2018	Nominated	Best Newcomer – Deutscher Filmmusikpreis (German Film Music Award)
2018	Winner	Global Music Award – Experimental/Crossover
2019	Nominated	DOK.fest München Composition Funding Prize
2020	Winner	Best Orchestration From An International Mini Series – Garden State Film Festival for Walpurgisnacht
2020	Winner	Bayerischer Kompositionspreis (Bavarian Composition Prize)
2021	Winner	New Classics Organ Taurida (Moscow) – Third Place

== Press reviews ==
- J-P Mauro on the international sacred-music site Aleteia: "A composer of sacred music and film scores, Rehfeldt beautifully captures the emotion behind the text … 'Oratio' is the greatest sacred music recording of 2020."
- Tilmann P. Gangloff in Filmnews: "The ensemble is as exceptional as Mathias Rehfeldt's film music, which is often reminiscent of Tangerine Dream."
- Brawoo (German wind-music magazine), Severin Richter: "With his Sinfonia Maris Mathias Rehfeldt has created a masterpiece, brought to life with the utmost precision, unbridled joy in playing and very intense yet never kitschy melodic shaping."
