= Alberte Brun =

French woman classical pianist

Alberte Brun-Michelis (2 January 1918 – 10 March 1991) was a French classical pianist.

== Life ==
Born in Paris, Brun studied at the Conservatoire de Paris with Marguerite Long. She received further instruction from Maurice Ravel, with whom she studied his Piano Concerto for the Left Hand. Commissioned by the Ministère des Beaux-Arts, she performed the complete piano works of Albert Roussel. She later lived in Germany, where she taught at the Robert Schumann Hochschule Düsseldorf in Düsseldorf. Her interpretations were documented by radio recordings. She was a member, from 1980 to 1986 chairperson of the Deutsch-Französische Gesellschaft Duisburg, where she was for many years the leader of the "Conversationsabende". In 1947, she performed Ravel's Piano Concerto for the Left Hand with the Deutsches Symphonie-Orchester Berlin at its first public concert at the Titania-Palast. In 1975, she and her sister Andree Juliette Brun performed as a piano duo in the Carnegie Hall in New York.

== Students ==
- Helmut Kickton
- Reinhard Kluth
- Thorsten Pech

== Recording ==
- Claude Debussy: Préludes (aem records 1976)
