= Thorsten Pech =

German church musician

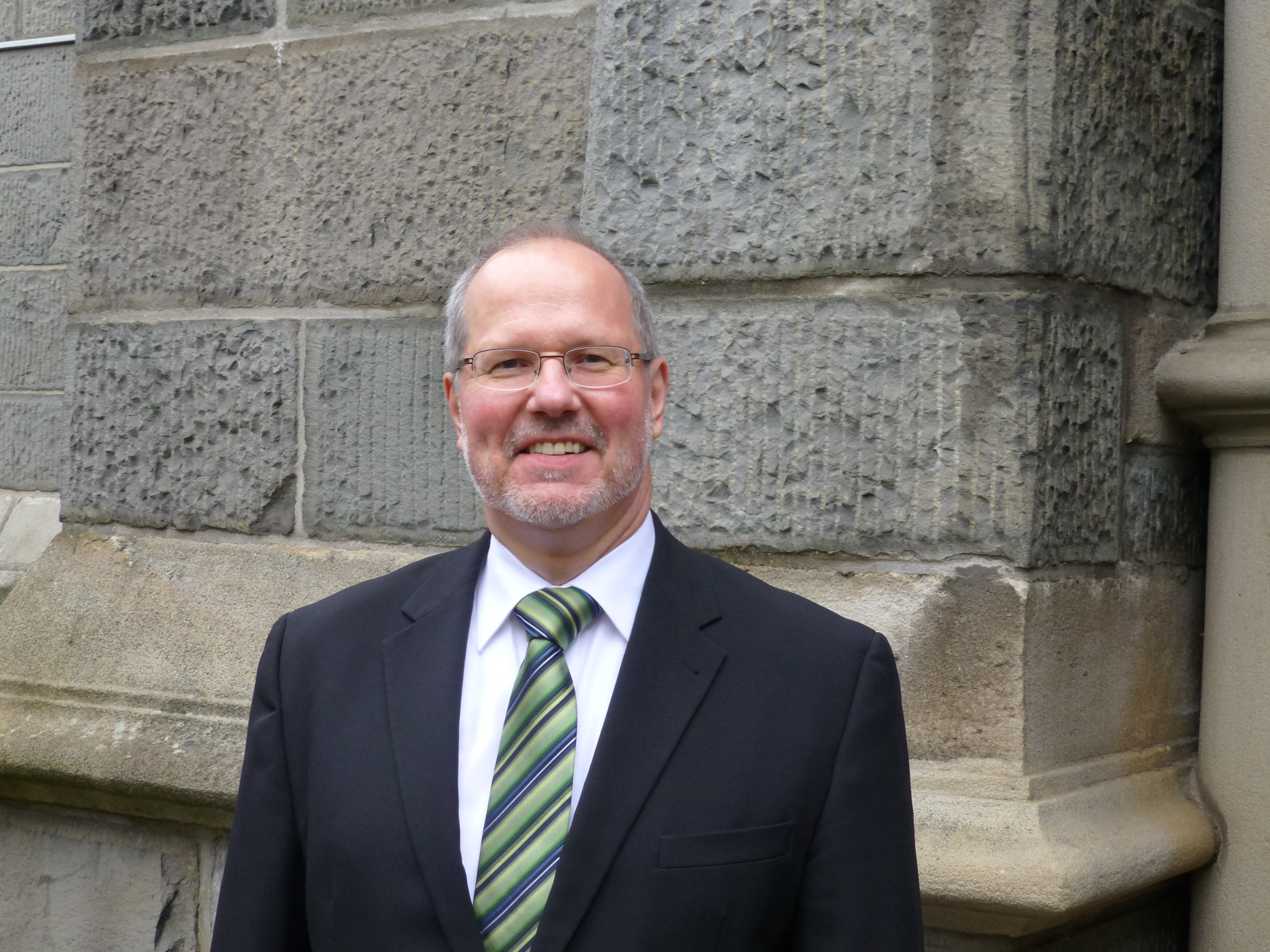
- Thorsten Pech in front of the Elberfeld Cemetery

Background information
- Born: 3 November 1960 (age 65); Wuppertal, West Germany
- Occupation: Church musician

Thorsten Pech (born 3 November 1960) is a German church musician.

== Life ==
Born in Wuppertal, Pech studied Protestant church music at the Robert Schumann Hochschule Düsseldorf from 1976 to 1980 with Hanns-Alfons Siegel (organ), Alberte Brun (piano), Hartmut Schmidt (choir direction). After his postgraduate studies in organ and participation in various master classes (among others Daniel Roth, Anton Heiller) he passed his final examination in 1983 with Hans-Dieter Möller. Pech completed his conducting studies in Vienna with Julius Kalmar in 1985 with a diploma.

Since 1977, he has worked as a cantor and organist, first in Düsseldorf, since 1997 in Wuppertal-Elberfeld at the Alte lutherische Kirche am Kolk and the Friedhofskirche, since 2016 as full-time cantor at the aforementioned churches. In 1992, Pech also took up freelance work as a concert organist and conductor, which has led him through numerous concert engagements at home and abroad.

Since 1989 he has been artistic director and choir director at the Bachverein Düsseldorf, and in 2003 he took over as conductor of the concert choir of the Kulturgemeinde Volksbühne Wuppertal. In 1998 he was awarded the title music director by the Fachverband der Chorleiter. In 2016, he was a laureate of the Enno und Christa Springmann-Stiftung.

== Recordings ==
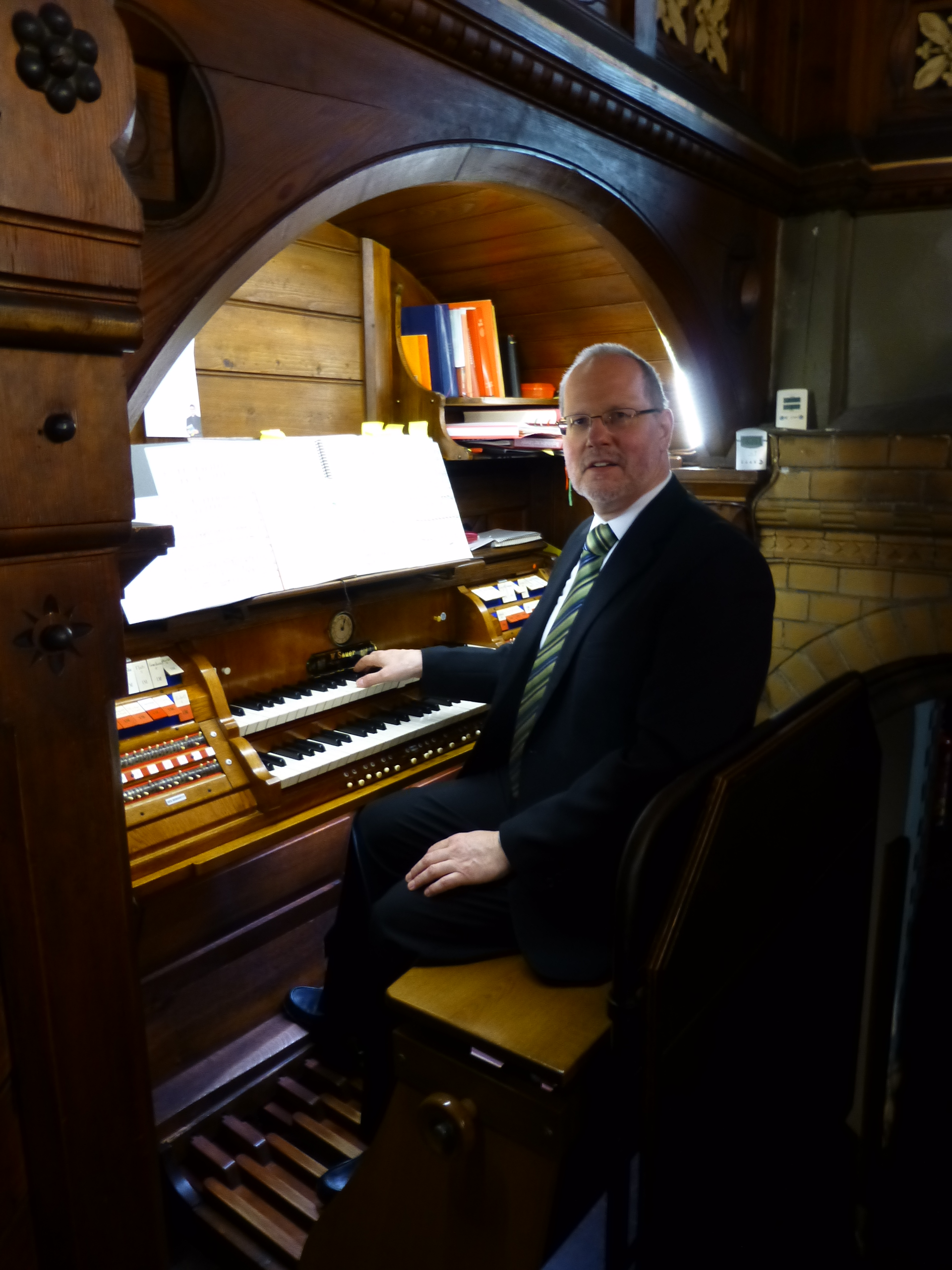
Thorsten Pech at the Sauer organ of the Elberfeld cemetery church

- Soli Deo Gloria: Bachverein Düsseldorf und Thorsten Pech (direction and organ)
- Orgelwanderung durch Elberfeld – Thorsten Pech spielt an den Orgeln der Friedhofskirche (Sauer), Kreuzkirche (Beckerath), Auferstehungskirche (Peter) and Kolk (Klais)
- Die Klais-Orgel der Alten luth. Kirche am Kolk, Wuppertal-Elberfeld: Thorsten Pech (organ)
- Die heitere Orgel – Thorsten Pech spielt an der Klais/Sauer-Orgel der Herz-Jesu-Kirche Wuppertal
- Josef Gabriel Rheinberger – Das Orgelwerk – Thorsten Pech spielt an der Klais/Sauer-Orgel der Herz-Jesu-Kirche Wuppertal
- Bach trifft … auf europäische Musiktraditionen: Uwe Komischke (trumpet) and Thorsten Pech (organ)
- Romantische Impressionen: Uwe Komischke (trumpet) and Thorsten Pech (organ)
- Musik und Meditation im Jahreskreis der Kirche: Uwe Komischke (trumpet) and Thorsten Pech (organ) in Kloster Huysburg
- Musik in der Kulturhauptstadt Weimar: Uwe Komischke (trumpet), Weimarer Bach-Trompeten-Ensemble and Thorsten Pech (organ)
- Trompete und Orgel in der Bergkirche Schleiz: Uwe Komischke (trumpet) and Thorsten Pech (organ)
- Meisterwerke Trompete und Orgel in der Christuskirche Schwelm: Uwe Komischke (Trompete) and Thorsten Pech (organ)
- The Cathedral: Uwe Komischke (trumpet), Weimarer Bach-Trompeten-Ensemble und Thorsten Pech (organ)
- Trompete und Orgel an der Klais-Orgel der Pfarrkirche Bonn-Endenich: Uwe Komischke (trumpet) und Thorsten Pech (organ)
- Festliche Bläsermusiken für die Dresdner Frauenkirche: Uwe Komischke (trumpet), Weimarer Bach-Trompeten-Ensemble and Thorsten Pech (organ)
- In dir ist Freude: Uwe Komischke (trumpet) und Thorsten Pech (organ) in der Christuskirche Schwelm
