= Gregor Wenning =

German neurologist (1964–2024)

Gregor Karl Wenning (21 March 1964 – 11 February 2024) was a German neurologist best known for his clinical and scientific work in Parkinson's disease and atypical Parkinsonian disorders, particularly multiple system atrophy (MSA). In 2006 he was appointed Professor and Head of the Division of Clinical Neurobiology at the Medical University Innsbruck. Wenning died on 11 February 2024, at the age of 59.

== Early life and education ==
Wenning was born in Horstmar, Westfalia on 21 March 1964 to Karl-Heinz Wenning, a school teacher, and Elisabeth Wenning (née Terwort), a secretary. One of his brothers is the German church musician and composer Martin Wenning.

After completing preparatory school, he studied medicine (1983–1990) at the Wilhelms University in Muenster (Westphalia) as a scholarship holder of the Studienstiftung des deutschen Volkes. He completed his studies in 1991 with a thesis on motor system degeneration and obtained his doctorate "summa cum laude".

From 1992 to 1994, he obtained a research scholarship by the UK Parkinson's Disease Society and became Clinical Research Fellow and PhD Student at the Institute of Neurology, (Queen Square) in London, where he conducted work on the experimental, clinical and neuropathological aspects of multiple system atrophy (MSA). In January 1996, he completed the MSA research doctorate at the university in London, obtaining the title of Doctor of Philosophy (PhD). The title of his thesis was "A clinico-pathological and animal experimental study of multiple system atrophy.".

Between 1997 and 1999, he completed his training to become a specialist in neurology and psychiatry at the Innsbruck University Clinic. He subsequently established an internationally successful MSA research program at the Department for Neurology in Innsbruck. In 1999, he was appointed associate professor of neurology at Innsbruck University's Faculty of Medicine.

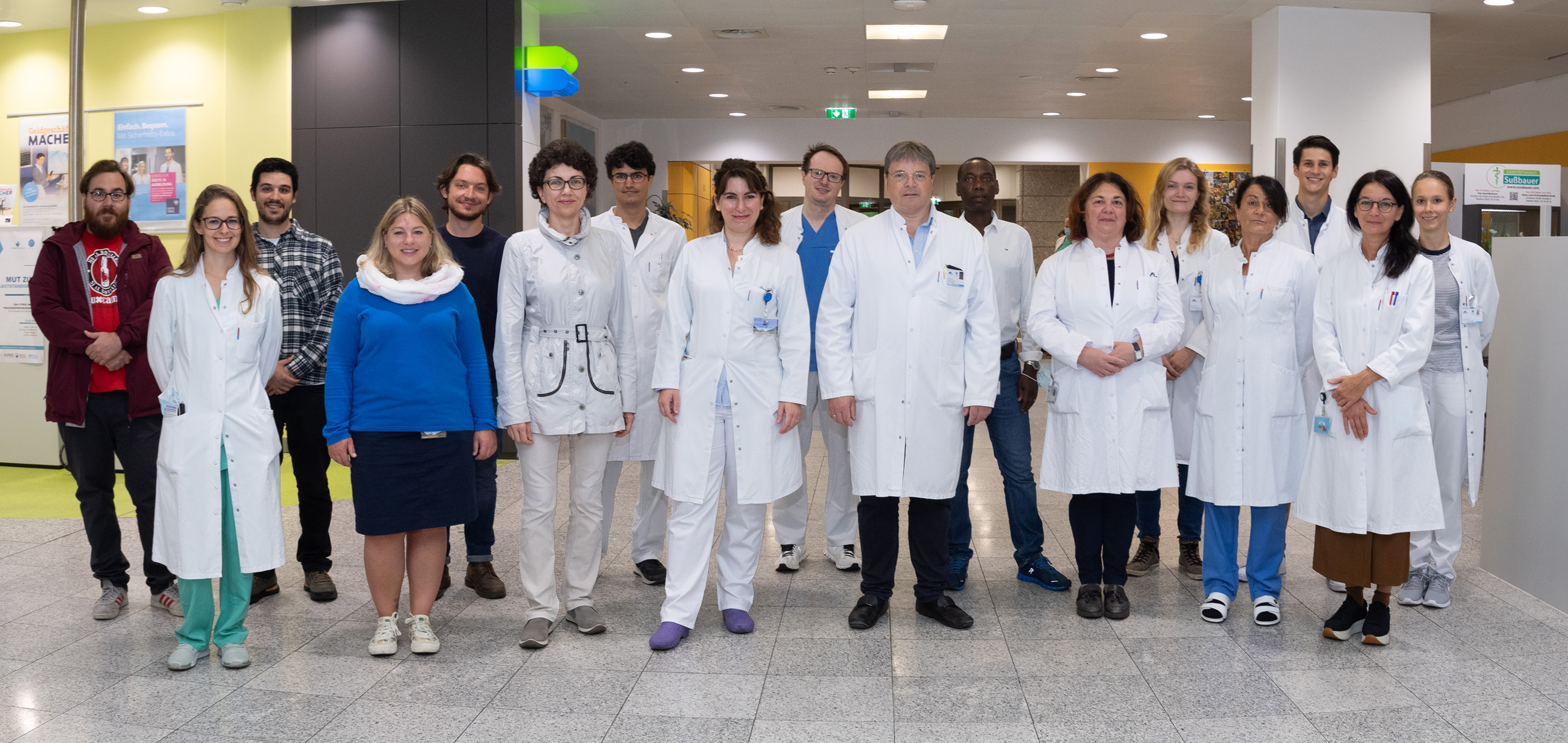
Division of Neurobiology of the Medical University of Innsbruck

In 2006, he was appointed Professor of Clinical Neurobiology and Chair of the Division of Neurobiology at the Department of Neurology, Medical University of Innsbruck. In 2007, he was awarded the title MSc "Master of Health Economics" by the Private University for Health Services, Medical Informatics and Technology (UMIT), Hall in Tirol. In 2018 Wenning was appointed director of the Dysautonomia Center at the Medical University Innsbruck.

== Work ==
The scientific focus of Wenning's work centred on the research of atypical Parkinsonian syndromes, particularly multiple system atrophy, using experimental, clinicopathological and therapeutic studies. In addition to caring for patients with Parkinsonian syndromes and dementia, his clinical activities also included the work up and treatment of autonomic disorders. To this end one of Austria's first tilt table laboratories for diagnosing neurocirculatory disturbances was established in 2000.

His contributions have helped to overcome the difficulties associated with the diagnostic distinction of MSA and PD patients. The process of differentiating these diseases, which sometimes feature very similar symptoms, has been significantly improved with the help of neuroimaging tools.

As part of his laboratory work, Wenning developed numerous experimental models to gain a better understanding of the biological mechanisms of the disease. The first transgenic model for MSA, which combines genetic factors and neurotoxic lesions similar to the way the disease develops in humans, has generated considerable international attention.

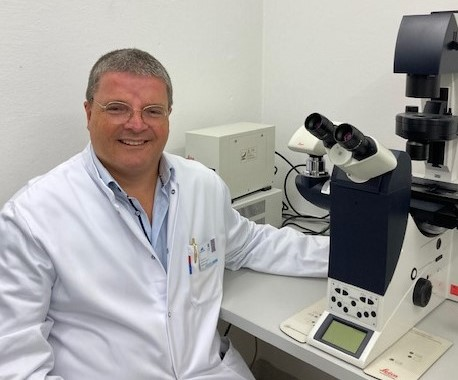
Wenning at the microscope in 2021

As Co-Founding Director and Coordinator of the European MSA Study Group, Wenning led a consortium of 24 MSA centres in Europe and Israel, with the goal of driving forward accurate diagnostic markers and translational therapy research.

From 2012 Wenning led the first global research network dedicated exclusively to MSA. In 2015 he became president of the Bishop Dr. Karl Golser Foundation (Facebook) promoting the discovery of disease modifying therapies in atypical Parkinsonian disorders. The first Bishop Dr. Karl Golser Award was bestowed upon Vikram Khurana (Harvard Medical School) and Gabor Kovacs (University of Toronto) in 2018 for their landmark discoveries in the field of neurodegenerative disorders. In 2020, Stanley Prusiner, Nobel laureate in 1997 for the discovery of prions, was bestowed with the Bishop Golser Award for his characterization of pathogenic synuclein prions in MSA.

In 2019 Wenning was appointed president of the scientific advisory board of the US MSA Coalition, the largest charitable organization worldwide so far supporting more than 40 MSA research projects. In 2019 he was appointed member of the senate at Medical University Innsbruck. In September 2021 he joined the MSA Coalition Board of Directors to lead Global Medical and Scientific Affairs.

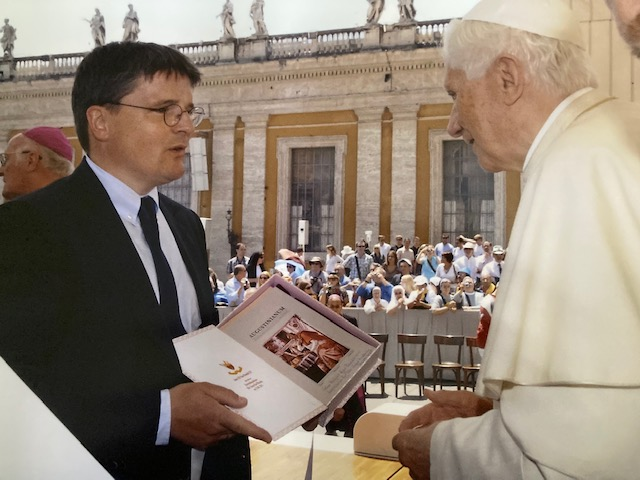
Wenning with the Pope in 2011

In addition to his medical and scientific work, Wenning has also made a name for himself through his philosophical works and treatises, mainly on the teachings of Saint Augustine. He was received in the prima fila by Pope Benedict XVI. in June 2011, presenting a South-Tyrolean Saint Augustine statue and three Augustine works authored by him (Fotografia Felici).

== Awards and prizes ==
- Scholarship - German National Scholarship Foundation, 1983–1990
- Scholarship - UK Parkinson's Disease Society, 1992–1994
- Science Prize - Austrian Parkinson's Disease Society, 1998 (First recipient)
- MSA Research Prize - Oppenheimer Prize, 2004 (First recipient)
- MSA Research Prize - JiePie Schouppe Award, 2014 (First recipient)
- 2016 Inaugural Stephen Myers Lecture, Baltimore, USA
- 2017 Plenary MSA Lecture, AAS Newport Beach, CA, USA
- 2017 Dr Johannes Tuba price of the Tiroler Ärztekammer
- 2020 JP Schouppe Award for lifetime achievements in MSA
- Wittgenstein Award Nominee 2020

== Fellowships abroad ==
- Institute of Neurology, Queen Square, London, UK (1992-1994)
- Neuroepidemiology Branch, NINDS/NIH, Bethesda, USA (1996)
- Autonomic Function Laboratory, National Hospital for Neurology and Neurosurgery, Queen Square, London, UK (2000)
- Brain Repair Group, School of Biosciences, Cardiff University, UK (07/2004)
- Wallenberg Neuroscience Centre, Section of Restorative Neurology, Lund, Germany (04/2005)
- Western General Hospital, Toronto, Canada (07/2008)

== Important publications ==
- Wenning et al. Brain 1994;117-835-845
- Wenning et al. Ann Neurol 1997,42:95-107
- Wenning et al. Lancet Neurol 2004; 3(2):93-103
- Wenning et al. Ann Neurol 2008;64:239-46
- Wenning et al. Lancet Neurol 2013;12:264-74
- Fanciulli & Wenning. N Engl J Med 2015; 372(3):249-63
- Krismer & Wenning. Nat Rev Neurol 2017; 17(13): 232-243
- 600 peer reviewed publications
- chapters & books with >40000 citations
- H‐index 104
- >250 invited talks at international conferences and departmental seminars
