= Vesko Eschkenazy =

Bulgarian violinist (born 1970)

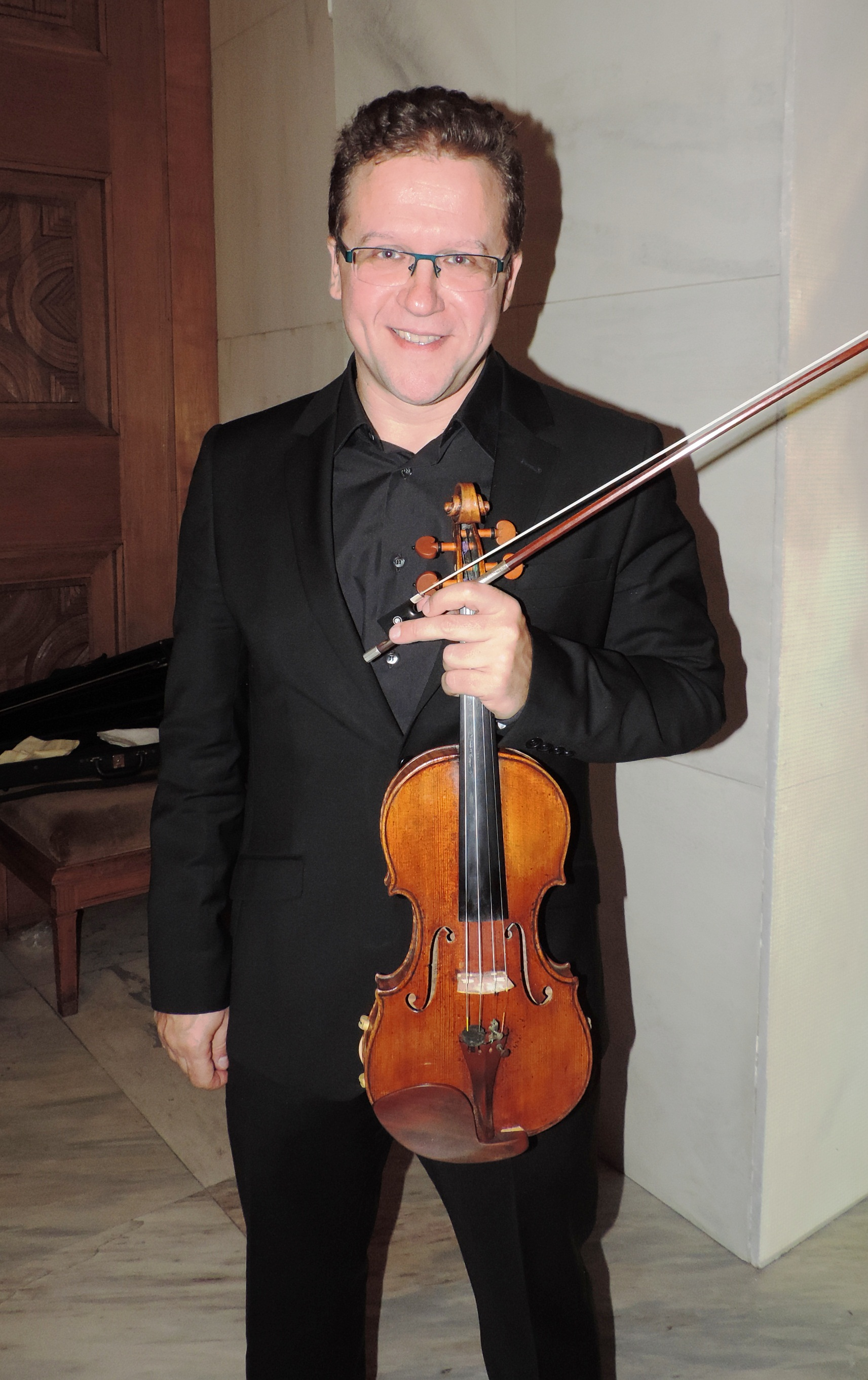
Vesko Eschkenazy giving concert at the opening the exhibition "Fragile Tolerance", National Historical Museum, Sofia, Bulgaria, 9 Nov. 2015

Vesko Eschkenazy (born 1970) is a violinist who serves as the Royal Concertgebouw Orchestra's concertmaster.

== Biography ==
Born into a Bulgarian-Jewish family in 1970, Vesko Panteleev Eschkenazy became a child prodigy in the field of music when he appeared as an orchestra leader. At 11 years old, he went on to become the concertmaster of the youth Philharmonic Orchestra of Prof. Vladi Simeonov. He is a graduate of the L. Pipkov National Music School in Sofia and of the P. Vladiguerov State Music Academy where he studied violin with Angelina Atanassova and Prof. Petar Hristoskov.

In 1990, Eschkenazy left Bulgaria for London and completed a two-year master's degree for solo performers with Prof. Ifrah Neaman at the Guildhall School of Music, and received a Solo Recital Diploma – 1992. He is a laureate of the International Violin Competitions "Wieniawski", Beijing and Carl Flesch in London. He performs extensively in Europe, USA, South America, India, China and takes part in the festivals Midem in Cannes, Montpellier and Atlantic – France, the Music Festivals in Nantes and Rheims, the New Year Music Festival in Sofia, Varna Summer and Apolonia.

Vesko Eschkenazy has performed as soloist with the Royal Concertgebouw Orchestra, London Philharmonic Orchestra, English Chamber Orchestra, Monte Carlo Philharmonic, Sofia Philharmonic Orchestra, Mexico City Symphony, the Netherlands Philharmonic Orchestra, Prague Symphony Orchestra, National Symphony Orchestra of Ireland, Bach Chamber Orchestra – Berlin to name a few. He has taken part in concerts alongside Montserrat Caballe, Plácido Domingo, Alexis Weissenberg, Yuri Bashmet, and Mstislav Rostropovich and has played under the direction of Mariss Jansons, Bernard Haitink, Riccardo Chailly, Kurt Masur, Sir Colin Davis, Carlo-Maria Giulini, Seiji Ozawa, and Emil Tchakarov.

Since the summer of 2000 Vesko Eschkenazy has been playing the Adam Wurlitzer Guarneri del Gesu violin from 1738 through the RCO Foundation.

== Performances ==
"Vesko Eschkenazy is a brilliant violinist" – remarked the De Telegraaf in November 2000, one of the largest dailies in the Kingdom of Netherlands, after his interpretation of the Violin Concerto No. 1 by Szymanowski with the Royal Concertgebouw Orchestra in Amsterdam. Eschkenazy has been its concertmaster since the beginning of the 1999/2000 season.

Each concert season is extremely full of engagements for Vesko Eschkenazy; some of his most outstanding performances were that of Mozart's Violin Concerto in A Major under Mariss Jansons, and the Dvořák Violin Concerto under Sir Colin Davis and coming up in November 2008 performances of the Barber Violin Concerto conducted by Jaap van Zweden, all with the Royal Concertgebouw Orchestra. In April–May 2009 Eschkenazy performed extensively with his brother, the conductor Martin Panteleev, with whom he performed the Dvořák Violin Concerto with Orkest van het Oosten, Mozart's A Major Concerto No. 5 with the Concertgebouw Chamber Orchestra and many other works. The two brothers accomplished a tour to Sofia and Istanbul with the Concertgebouw Chamber Orchestra in the same time.

Vesko Eschkenazy records for Pentatone, his recording with the Concertgebouw Chamber Orchestra of violin concertos by Mozart, Mendelssohn and Schubert received high appraisal from critics. On this occasion the Luister Magazine, Holland remarks: "Vesko Eschkenazy writes history with his new super recording for the Pentatone Classics of the violin concertos by Mozart and Mendelssohn". Michael Libovits (USA's Classics Today), wrote: "he tackles Mozart with brilliance; Schubert with a stable phrasing … his warm, well rounded tone competes with any other recording of a famous violinist …"

In 1995 Vesko Eschkenazy joined the pianist Ludmil Angelov to perform sonata duos. They have given a large number of concerts in Europe, exceptionally successful and warmly accepted were those by the Spanish audiences (in the cities of Gijon, Toledo and Madrid). This was a project of the Vesko Eschkenazy – Ludmil Angelov Duo presenting, in four successive evening cycles, the complete Mozart sonatas for violin and piano. Their joint Russian Music CD has been released by the Gega New Music House. Their second album, "The Fascinating George Gershwin", has been released by Pentatone. In October 2007 the musicians performed a recital in a sold-out "Bulgaria Hall" in Sofia, broadcast live by Bulgarian national television.

The 2010/2011 season Vesko started with open air performance in the very centre of Sofia with the Sofia Philharmonic Orchestra gathering the largest audience for classical concert ever. In the same season he will be artist in residence in the Bulgaria Hall in Sofia with 4 recitals and performance of the Bruch Violin Concerto in G minor with the Sofia Philharmonic. He will perform the same work with the Royal Concertgebouw Orchestra and Kurt Masur in the 2011/2012 season. His last performances with Eduard Lalo's Symphonie Espagnole with RCO in Amsterdam and in Cape Town and Sofia in 2013/2014 were memorable. His new all Bach CD with the Concertgebouw Chamber Orchestra is out on PENTATONE.

In 2014 Eschkenazy appeared with the Royal Concertgebouw Orchestra in a programme juxtaposing Antonio Vivaldi's The Four Seasons with Astor Piazzolla's The Four Seasons of Buenos Aires. The concert, filmed at the Concertgebouw in Amsterdam, featured Eschkenazy and Liviu Prunaru as violinists and leaders of the orchestra.

In Bulgaria, one of Eschkenazy's major later projects was the jubilee concert "Vesko Eschkenazy at 50" with the Pleven Philharmonic, conducted by Martin Panteleev, held on 16 April 2022 in Hall 1 of the National Palace of Culture in Sofia. The concert brought together music, poetry and theatre and included guest appearances by Ludmil Angelov, Dani Milev, Lucy Diakovska, Adriana Nikolova-Pechenkata and Rudik Yakin, with actress Koyna Ruseva as narrator. For this project Eschkenazy received the 2022 "Crystal Lyre" award in the instrumentalist category; the programme included works by Albinoni, Vivaldi, Monti, Mendelssohn, Tchaikovsky, Gershwin, Pancho Vladigerov, Piazzolla, Carlos Gardel, Vladimir Ampov-Grafa, Dani Milev, Angel Zaberski and Artur Panteleev, among others.

In the early 2020s Eschkenazy also developed several large-scale Bulgarian touring projects with the Pleven Philharmonic. In 2022 and 2023 he took part in the national tour "In the World of Music" together with accordionist Veronika Todorova and conductor and arranger Georgi Miltiyadov; the project presented classical music, film music and popular arrangements in cities across Bulgaria. In 2025 he appeared with bandoneonist Stoyan Karaivanov and the Pleven Philharmonic in the project "Tango Classic", described by the Bulgarian News Agency as a national tour presenting the history of tango through classical music, film music and Argentine rhythms. The same project was continued in 2026 with further concerts, including performances in Kardzhali, Haskovo and Harmanli, with Eschkenazy as violin soloist and Karaivanov as bandoneon soloist.

Eschkenazy has appeared repeatedly with the Sofia Philharmonic Orchestra under the direction of Nayden Todorov. On 16 July 2020, he was soloist in Sofia in a programme combining Vivaldi's The Four Seasons and Piazzolla's The Four Seasons of Buenos Aires, with Todorov conducting the Sofia Philharmonic. On 24 November 2022, he performed Mendelssohn's Violin Concerto in E minor, Op. 64, with the Sofia Philharmonic and Todorov in Bulgaria Hall; the same programme also included Mendelssohn's Symphony No. 4, "Italian". Two days later, on 26 November 2022, Eschkenazy, Todorov and the Sofia Philharmonic presented the same Mendelssohn programme at the Vatroslav Lisinski Concert Hall in Zagreb, in collaboration with the Embassy of Bulgaria. On 2 June 2024 Eschkenazy again appeared with Todorov and the Sofia Philharmonic in a sold-out Bulgaria Hall concert of Vivaldi's The Four Seasons and Piazzolla's The Four Seasons of Buenos Aires.

== Competition record ==
- Kocian International Violin Competition 1984
- Wieniawski Competition (together with Maxim Vengerov) in Poland 1985
- Beijing International Violin Competition 1986
- Carl Flesch Competition in London 1988
- "Musician of the year 2010" in Bulgaria.

== Discography ==
- Johann Sebastian Bach - The Two Violin Concertos. Vesko Eschkenazy, Tjeerd Top, Alexei Ogrintchouk, Concertgebouw Chamber Orchestra. PENTATONE PTC 5186460 (2012).
- Mozart - Mendelssohn - Violin Concertos; Schubert – Rondo. Vesko Eschkenazy, Marco Boni, Concertgebouw Chamber Orchestra. PENTATONE PTC 5186001 (2002).
- Tango Royal. Works by Astor Piazzolla, Carel Kraayenhof, Roberto D. Alvarez. Ed Spanjaard, Vesko Eschkenazy, Concertgebouw Chamber Orchestra, Sexteto Canyengue. PENTATONE PTC 5186008 (2012).
- The fascinating George Gershwin. Gregor Horsch, George Pieterson, Henk Rubingh, Marijn Mijnders, Ludmil Angelov, Herman Rieken, Vesko Eschkenazy. PENTATONE PTC 5186021 (2003).
- Super Audio CD Sampler. Works by Wolfgang Amadeus Mozart, Ludwig van Beethoven, Felix Mendelssohn-Bartholdy, Franz Schmidt, Gustav Mahler. Marco Boni, Hartmut Haenchen, Nikolai Korniev, Yakov Kreizberg, Simon Murphy, Kent Nagano, Bram Beekman, Vesko Eschkenazy, Mari Kodama, Miranda van Kralingen, Nikolai Lugansky, Keisuke Wakao, Concertgebouw Chamber Orchestra. PENTATONE PTC 5186043 (2003).
