= Sieling =

Sieling is a surname. Notable people with the surname include:

- Andreas Sieling (born 1964), German organist and musicologist
- Carsten Sieling (born 1959), German politician
- Charlotte Sieling (born 1960), Danish actress and film director
