= Rüdiger Bohn =

German conductor and professor

Rüdiger Bohn (born 1960) is a German conductor and professor.

== Biography ==
Born in Lübeck in 1960, Bohn studied piano and conducting at the Hochschule für Musik in Köln and the Hochschule für Musik "Robert Schumann" in Düsseldorf. He also attended masterclasses with Leonard Bernstein, Sergiu Celibidache and John Eliot Gardiner.

He was a solorepetiro at La Monnaie (Brussels) and from 1988 to 1996 principal conductor of the Sinfonietta Tübingen, where he became known as a fine performer of contemporary music. After a few years working as conductor at the Theater Basel, in 1996 he became the first Kapellmeister at the Theater Lübeck. In 1997 he became the music director of the Zeitgenössische Oper Berlin.

He is the principal professor of conduct at the Hochschule für Musik "Robert Schumann" in Düsseldorf.
