= Lesia Dychko =

Ukrainian music educator and composer

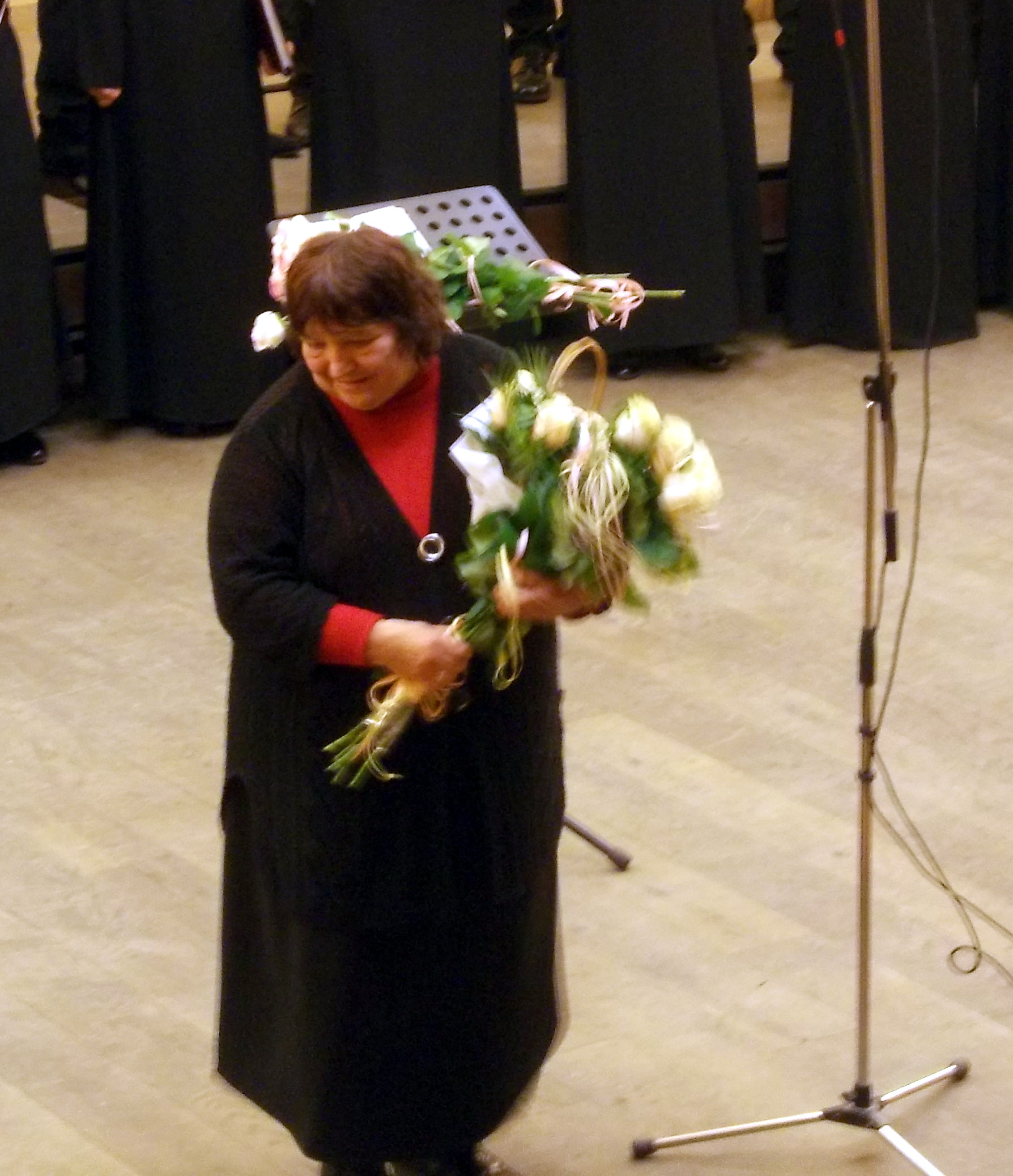
Lesia Dychko in 2014

Lesia Vasylivna Dychko (Ukrainian: Леся Василівна Дичко), originally Liudmyla Vasylivna Dychko (born 24 October 1939) is a Ukrainian composer and music educator.

== Life ==
=== Early years and education ===
Lesia Vasylivna Dychko was born Liudmyla Vasylivna Dychko in Kyiv on 24 October 1939. She graduated from the Kyiv Lysenko State Music Lyceum in 1959 with a degree in music theory. In 1964 she graduated from the Ukrainian National Tchaikovsky Academy of Music in composition, studying with the composers Konstantyn Dankevych and Borys Lyatoshynsky. In 1971 she studied with the Soviet composer Nikolai Peiko.

=== Career ===
After completing her studies, Dychko worked as a music teacher. She lectured at the Kyiv Pedagogical Institute from 1965 to 1966, at the Kyiv Arts Academy from 1972 to 1994, at the Studio of the Honoured Ukrainian State Bandura Players Choir beginning in 1965.

In 1993, Dychko took a position at the Ukrainian National Tchaikovsky Academy of Music, She became a professor there at in 2009. She has lectured as a visiting professor at other universities.

=== Prizes and awards ===
In 1969, Dychko won first prize at a Moscow young composers’ competition. She received the Mykola Ostrovsky LKSMU Republican Award in 1970, and the Shevchenko National Prize in 1989. She became an Honoured Representative of the Arts of Ukraine in 1982, and a People's Artist of Ukraine in 1995.

== Works ==
Dychko has been associated with the Neofolkloric Wave. Dychko incorporates elements of Ukrainian folk music in to her works, incorporating neo-folklorist music. Most of her compositions are choral works in which she reinterprets paintings and old folklore texts.

Dychko composes sacred music.She was one of the first Soviet composers to compose church music. Her output includes film soundtracks. She composes for orchestral, choral and instrumental performance including flute, violin, organ and piano.

=== Incomplete list of compositions ===
(Information from the New Grove Dictionary of Music and Musicians)

- 5 fantaziy (after paintings by Vasily Surikov, Isaac Levitan, Viktor Vasnetsov, and Ivan Shishkin), chorus and orchestra, 1962
- Dosvitni vogni [Fires Before Dawn] (ballet), 1966
- Natkhnennya [Inspiration] (ballet, after paintings by Kateryna Bilokur), 1966, revised in 1983
- Zolotoslov [The Mellifluous Talker] (opera), 1995
- Chervona kalina [The Red Guelder Rose Tree] (Ukrainian folk songs from 1400-1600), for solo voices and chorus, 1969, revised 1971
- Privitannya zhittya [Greeting to Life] (symphony, texts after Bohdan Ihor Antonych), for male soloists and orchestra, 1972
- Karpatskaya [The Carpathian Canticles] for chorus, 1975
- Chotyry pory roku [The Four Seasons] for chorus, 1975
- Sonyachne kolo [The Circle of the Sun] for children's chorus and orchestra 1975
- Vesna [Spring], children's chorus and orchestra 1976
- Zdravstvuy, novïy, dobrïy den′! [Greetings, New, Fine Day!], children's chorus, 1976
- Veter revolyutsii [The Wind of Revolution] (symphony, Maksym Rylsky and Pavlo Tychyna), chorus, 1976
- Slava rabochim professiyam! [Glory to the Working Professions!], for children's chorus, 1980
- U Kyevi zori [The Stars in Kiev] (traditional), 1982
- I narekosha imya Kiev [And They Gave it the Name Kiev] (oratorio, taken from Russian chronicles), 1982
- Indiya-Lakshmi (oratorio, Indian poets), 1986
- 5 khokku (choral concerto), 1989
- Liturgiya no.1 (choral concerto), 1994
- Liturgiya no.2 (choral concerto), 1995
- Frantsuzskiye freski [French Frescoes] (choral concerto), 1996
- Ispanskiye freski [Spanish Frescoes] (choral concerto), 1996
- Romances (after Ukraïnka, Ivan Franko, Rylsky and Tychyna)
- Holod – 33 [Famine 1933], choir poem, based on the words of S. Kolomiiets
- Lebedi materynstva [The Swans of Motherhood], choir poem, based on the poems of Vasyl Symonenko)
- Orchestral suites, string quartet, solo instrumental works, film scores music for piano.
