= Kyiv Lysenko State Music Lyceum =

Music boarding school

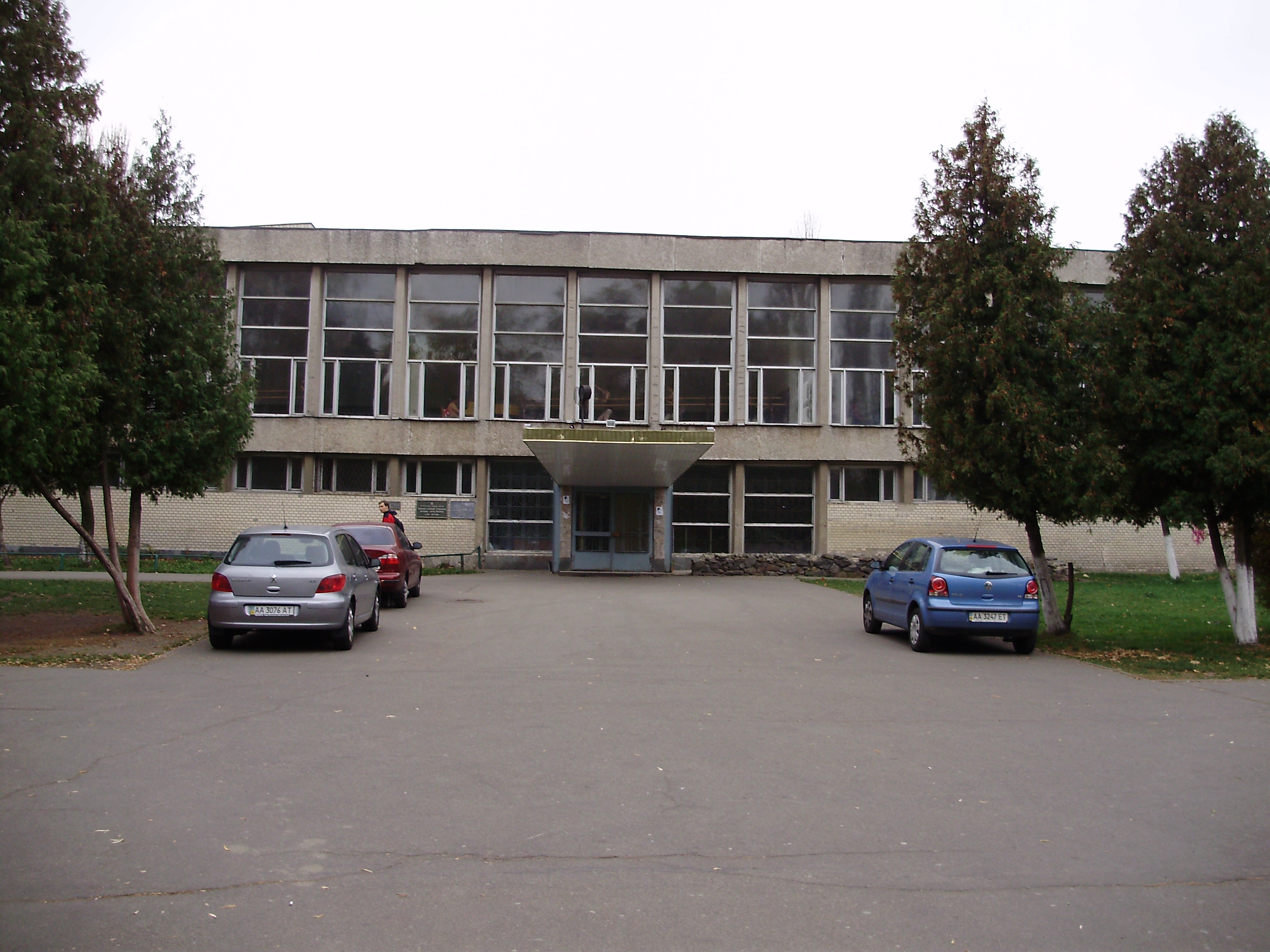
- KLSML – Kyiv Lysenko State Music Lyceum
- Type: specialized music boarding school
- Established: 1934
- Director: Oleksii Boiar
- Location: Kyiv, Ukraine
- Website: Kyiv Lysenko State Music Lyceum

The Kyiv Lysenko State Music Lyceum (Ukrainian: Київський державний музичний ліцей імені М. В. Лисенка) is a specialized secondary music school and boarding school in Kyiv, Ukraine. Founded in 1934, it provides specialized music education alongside general secondary education and is one of Ukraine's leading institutions for the training of young professional musicians.

The boarding school is a specialized secondary music school in Kyiv and one of four schools of its kind in Ukraine. The main purpose of the school is to train highly professional musicians.

Students study in specialized departments including piano, violin, string instruments, wind and percussion instruments, choral conducting, chamber ensemble and accompanying, general and specialized piano, and music theory, including composition. Since 2025, the Lyceum has been headed by Oleksii Boiar.

The Lyceum maintains several performing ensembles, among them the Chamber Girls' Choir, directed by Yuliia Puchko-Kolesnyk since 2008, and the Boys' and Young Men's Choir of the Kyiv Lysenko State Music Lyceum.

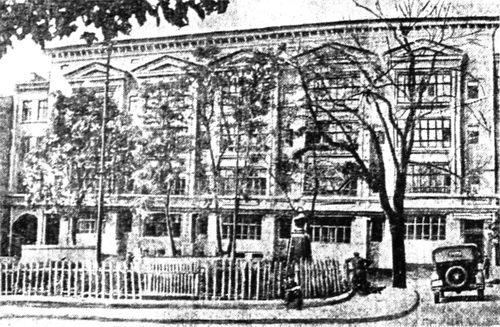
Old school building, 1930.

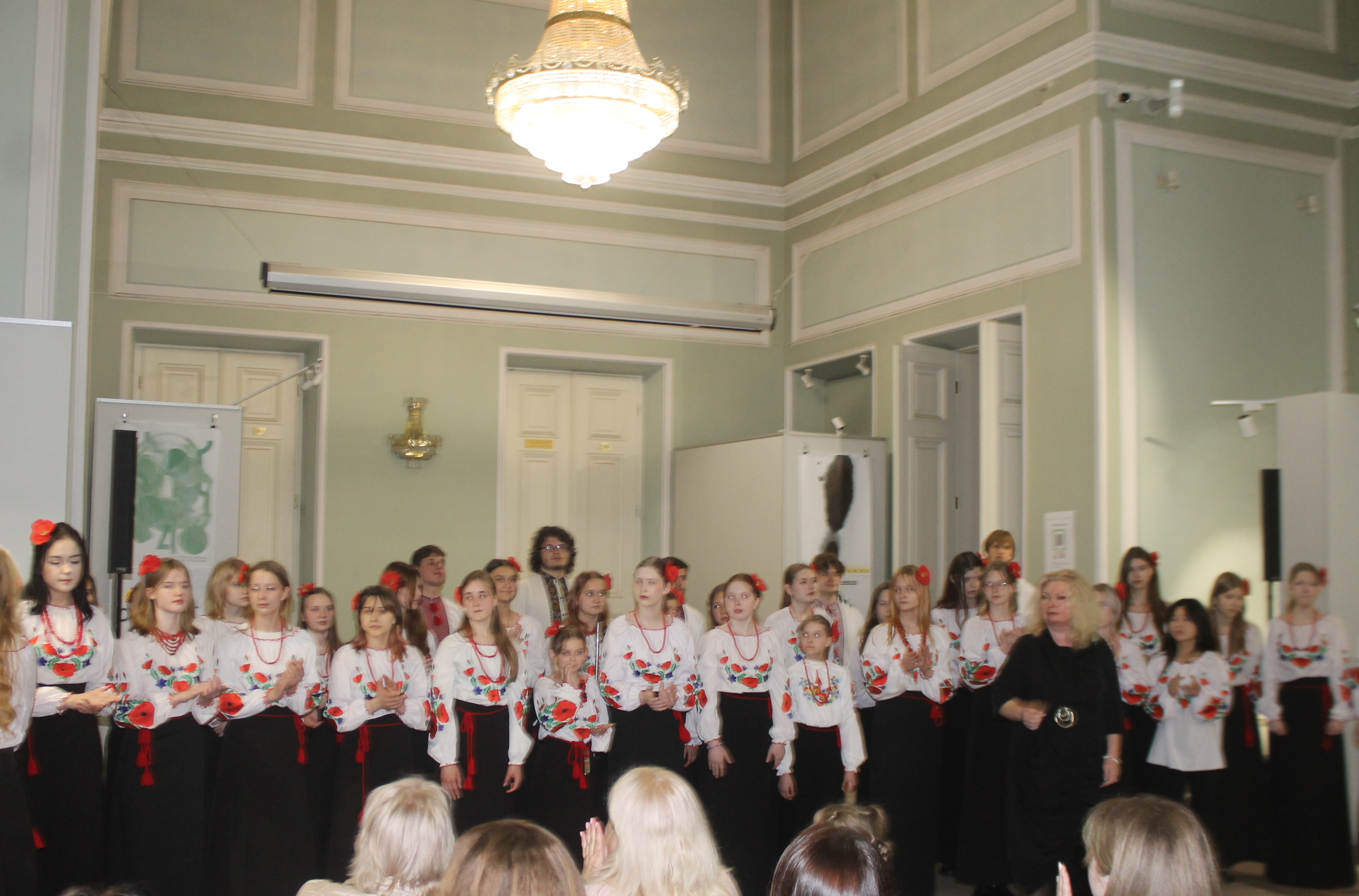
Chamber Girls' Choir of Kyiv Lysenko State Music Lyceum in 2026

== Notable alumni ==
The lyceum has educated numerous prominent Ukrainian and international musicians, including composers, pianists, violinists and conductors.

- Igor Shamo (1925–1982), Ukrainian composer and pianist
- Yan Frenkel (1920–1989), composer, singer and musician
- Volodymyr Shainsky (1925–2017), composer and People's Artist of the RSFSR
- Lesia Dychko (born 1939), Ukrainian composer and music educator, winner of the Shevchenko National Prize
- Mykhailo Stepanenko (1942–2017), Ukrainian composer, pianist and music educator
- Nikolai Shtarkman (1920–2006), pianist and professor
- Mikhail Petukhov (born 1954), pianist and professor
- Vadym Kholodenko (born 1986), Ukrainian pianist and winner of the Van Cliburn International Piano Competition
- Lilian Akopova (born 1983), Ukrainian pianist and winner of the Vianna da Motta International Music Competition
- Oleksandr Semchuk (born 1976), Ukrainian-Italian violinist and teacher
- Dmytro Tkachenko (born 1976), Ukrainian-British violinist
- Arkadiy Vinokurov (1949–2021), Ukrainian-German violinist
- Bohdana Pivnenko (born 1977), Ukrainian violinist and music educator
- Vladyslava Luchenko (born 1988), Ukrainian violinist
- Yurii Sytkovetskyi (1923–2002), Soviet and Ukrainian violinist
- Liudmyla Zvirko (1934–2019), Ukrainian pianist and professor
- Viktor Antonov (born 1940), Ukrainian pianist and teacher
