= Jürgen Sonnentheil =

German church musician

Jürgen Sonnentheil (born 1961) is a German church musician.

Sonnentheil studied church music in Bayreuth and at the Hochschule für Musik Köln (A-Examen). He supplemented his organ studies with the Konzertexamen in Robert Schumann Hochschule Düsseldorf. He is church musician at St. Petri in Cuxhaven, where he founded the Bach Festival, the BachFestbiennale (since 2012) and the ensemble "Das Neu-Eröffnete Orchestre", with musicians from all over Europe. Sonnentheil has published numerous sound documents as an organist and, with his ensemble, was the first to publish the complete orchestral works of Jan Dismas Zelenka on Classic Produktion Osnabrück. Recordings of his interpretations as conductor and organist were broadcast on the Hessischer Rundfunk, the Bayerischer Rundfunk and the Westdeutscher Rundfunk as well as Radio Bremen. Sonnentheil has recorded the works of the composer Wilhelm Middelschulte and edited them with Hans-Dieter Meyer for Bärenreiter. As a conductor, he has also commissioned works by Guy Bovet, Paul Engel and Romualds Kalsons.

== Recordings ==
- Johann Dismas Zelenka - Hipocondrie A-dur à 7 Concertanti Z 187, 2007
- Wilhelm Middelschulte Organ Works Vol. 4, 2007 (Bearbeitung der Goldberg-Variationen)
- Wilhelm Middelschulte: Organ Works 3, 2006
- Orgelsonaten und Lieder, with Gotthold Schwarz, 2006
- Valentin Rathgeber - Augsburgisches Tafel-Confect, 2005
- Jan Dismas Zelenka - Complete Orcherstral Works 1, 2004
- Wilhelm Middelschulte - Organ Works, 2002
- Jan Dismas Zelenka - Complete Orcherstral Works 3, 2002
- Jan Dismas Zelenka - Complete Orcherstral Works 2, 2002
- Wilhelm Middelschulte, Organ Works 2
- Historische Donat-Orgel
- Faszination Orgel
- Joseph Rheinberger, Organ Sonatas
