= Viktor Scholz =

German church organist (1935–2023)

Viktor Scholz (10 February 1935 – 31 March 2023) was a Soviet-born German church music director and concert organist.

== Life ==
Scholz was born Vitja Wladimirowitsch Kammeschow in the port city of Taganrog on the Sea of Azov and spent his childhood there. His father was a cellist and general music director of the city, his mother came from Moscow and was an aircraft designer by profession. During the Second World War, Taganrog was occupied by the Wehrmacht from 1941 to 1943. In 1945, his mother fled with him to Germany. The two reached Essen, where his mother became a housekeeper for the theologian Ernst Zenses. Scholz's father had been killed as a soldier in the war. Scholz was encouraged by Zenses and received his basic musical training from 1947 to 1954 in Essen with music director Heinz Gilhaus.

He then studied at the Catholic College of Church Music St. Gregorius in Aachen and graduated with the cantor examen. This was followed by studies at the Folkwang University of the Arts in Essen, which Scholz completed in 1959 with the Land music teacher's examination for the subjects piano and organ, with distinction in the organ subject.

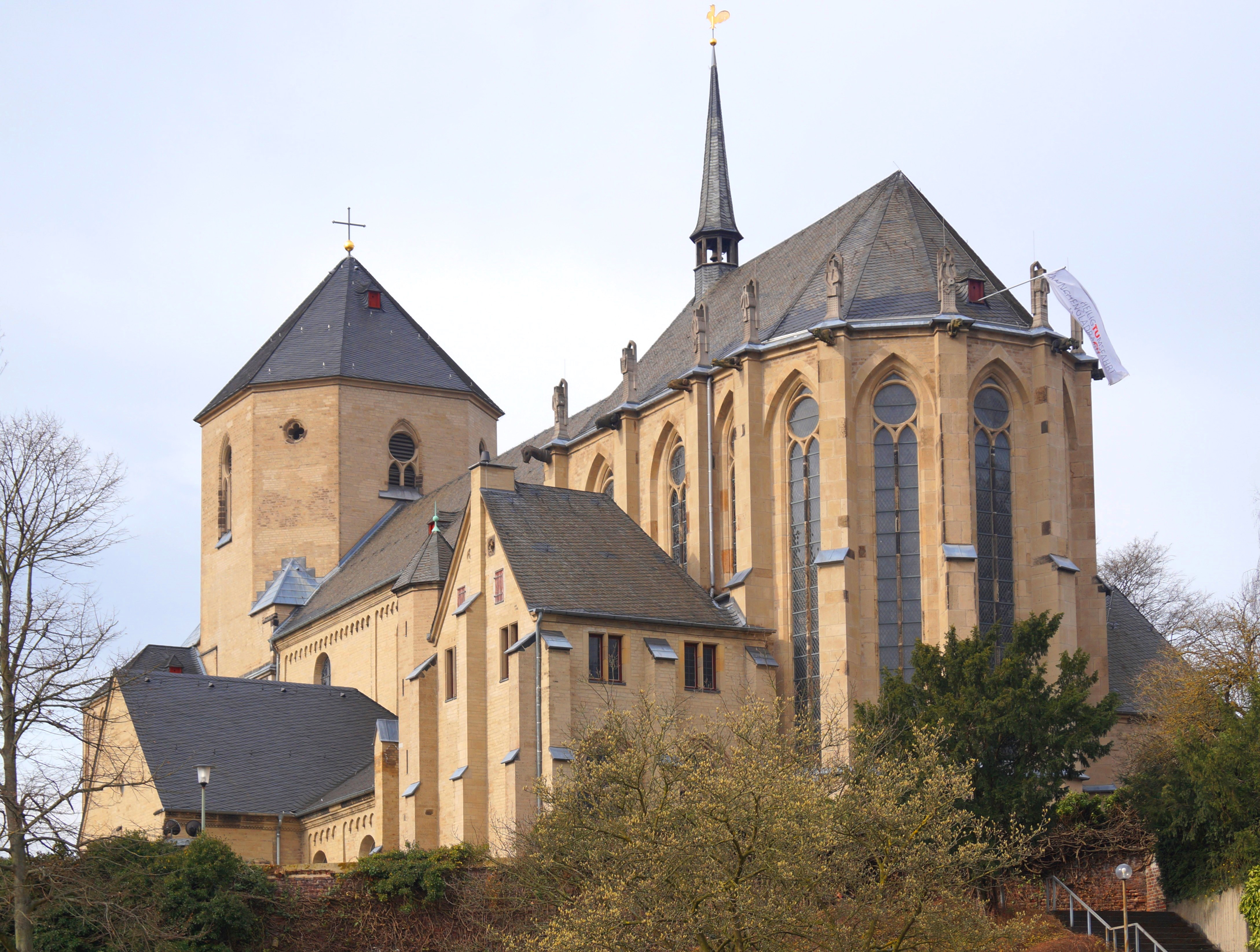
The Basilica of St. Vitus, Mönchengladbach, where Viktor Scholz was cantor from 1958 to 2000

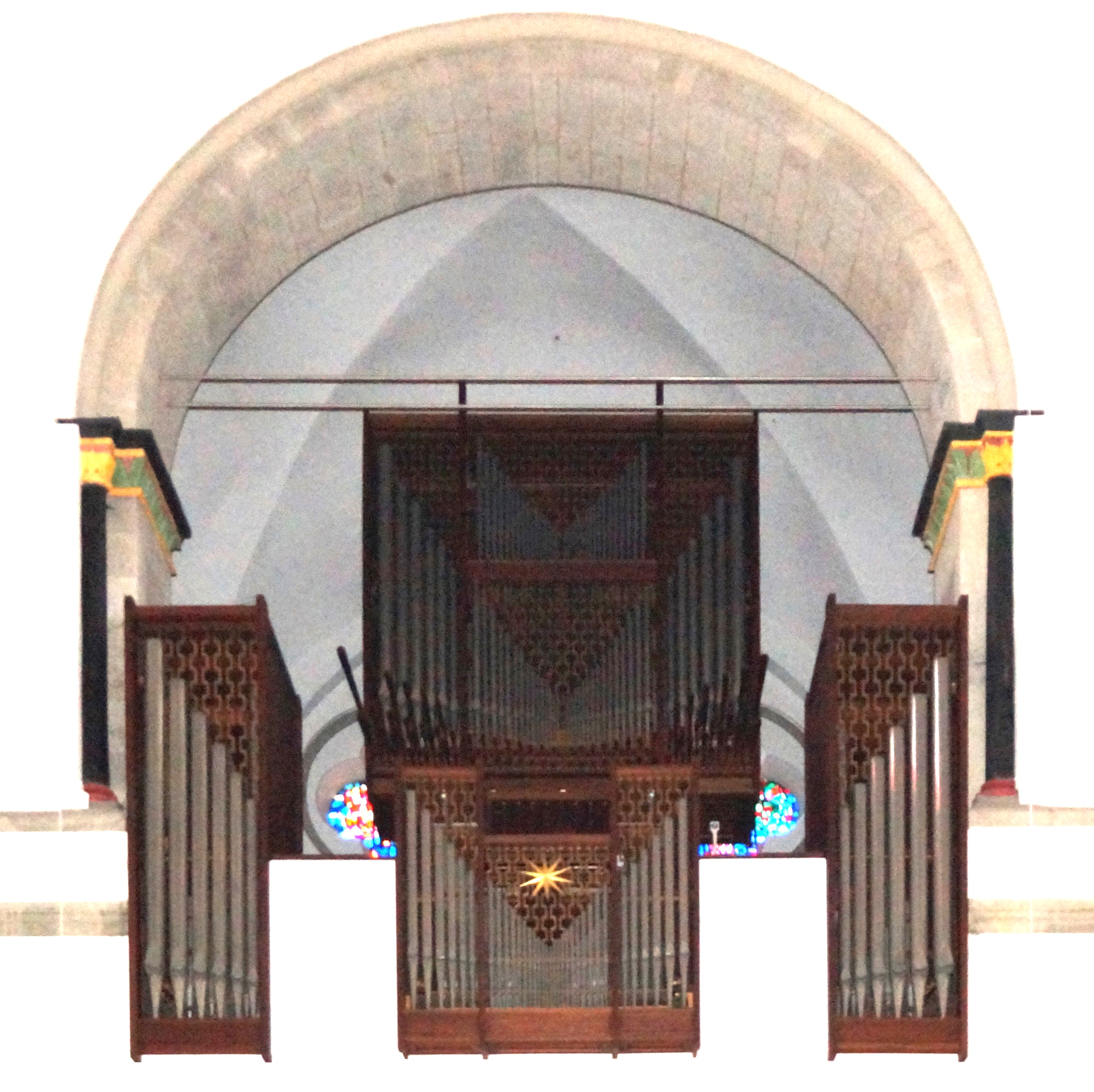
The casing of the basilica of St. Vitus in Mönchengladbach

Scholz took over as organist on sick leave at the Basilica of St. Vitus, Mönchengladbach at the end of 1957 and was subsequently employed there as cantor from 1 January 1958. He held the post for more than four decades, retiring in 2000. In addition, he worked as a lecturer for artistic organ playing and improvisation at the St. Gregorius House in Aachen. From 1974, he was Orgelsachverständiger of the Roman Catholic Diocese of Aachen. An extensive concert activity took him through Europe and Japan. In 1985/86, he was appointed church music director by diocesan bishop Klaus Hemmerle.

Scholz was married and lived with his wife in Mönchengladbach. The couple has three grown-up children, two of whom are also involved in music: Veit Scholz is solo bassoonist with the Düsseldorfer Symphoniker. Scholz was an organ builder in Mönchengladbach.

== Work ==
Scholz distinguished himself by his style of interpretation, which he passed on to his students and collaborators. Scholz made a name for himself with his interpretations of The Way of the Cross and Symphony Passion by Marcel Dupré and the organ works by Max Reger.

== Recordings ==
- Viktor Scholz spielt Werke von J. S. Bach u. K. Thieme. Pape, 1974
- Viktor Scholz spielt auf der Beckerath-Orgel, Hänssler Verlag, 1975
- Die Albiez-Orgel in der Mutterhauskirche zum Hl. Vinzenz. Psallite, 1976
- Viktor Scholz spielt Werke von Brahms, Fuchs und Schumann. Fono-Schallplattengesellschaft, 1979
- Die Oberlinger-Orgel in der Kath[olischen] Pfarrkirche S[ank]t Lambertus zu Erkelenz. Organophon, 1979
- Ars organi: Münster-Basilika zu Mönchengladbach. Aulos-Schallplatten-Produktion, Fono-Schallplattengesellschaft, 1980
- Die Orgel in der Basilika Steinfeld. Melos-Schallplattenverlag, Mönchengladbach, 1981
- Pastorale für Englischhorn und Orgel. Audite, Fono-Schallplattengesellschaft, 1996
- Habemus Papam. Das Vermächtnis des Karol Wojtyla. Musikado, 2003
