= Martin Berger (musician) =

German conductor, musicologist and academic teacher

- Born: 29 February 1972 (age 54); Wadern, Germany
- Education: Hochschule für Musik Saar; Robert Schumann Hochschule
- Occupations: conductor; Academic teacher
- Organizations: Robert Schumann Hochschule
- Website: www.rsh-duesseldorf.de/musikhochschule/personen/profil/420-prof-dr-martin-berger/

Martin Anton Berger (born 29 February 1972) is a German choral conductor, church musician and music educator. He was director of music at Würzburg Cathedral from 2002 to 2013 and subsequently taught choral conducting at Stellenbosch University in South Africa. He is professor of choral conducting at the Robert Schumann Hochschule in Düsseldorf.

== Biography ==
Berger studied church music, music education, German studies and conducting at the Hochschule für Musik Saar in Saarbrücken and the Robert Schumann Hochschule in Düsseldorf.

From 2002 to 2013, Berger was director of music (Domkapellmeister) at Würzburg Cathedral, where he directed the cathedral's choral ensembles. From 2008, he concurrently held a professorship in choral pedagogy at the Robert Schumann Hochschule. In 2010 he conducted the world premiere of Wilfried Hiller's Der Sohn des Zimmermanns at Würzburg Cathedral. The performance, involving more than 200 members of the cathedral's musical ensembles, was reviewed by Monika Beer in Opernwelt.

In September 2012, Berger conducted performances of Hiller's Augustinus in Würzburg, Rome and Castel Gandolfo. Following the performance at Castel Gandolfo, Pope Benedict XVI thanked Berger, the soloists, the Würzburg Cathedral Chamber Choir and the musicians for their performance.

Berger left Würzburg in 2013 to take up a position at Stellenbosch University in South Africa. At Stellenbosch he taught choral conducting and early music and founded the Stellenbosch University Chamber Choir in 2014. In 2015, the choir's Afrikaanse Lied, conducted by Berger, received the WoordtroFEE for best classical music production at the Stellenbosch Woordfees.

Berger returned to the Robert Schumann Hochschule as professor of choral conducting in 2018. He completed a doctorate at Stellenbosch University in 2020 with a dissertation on the sacred works of Wilfried Hiller. Since April 2026, he has served as managing director of the Hochschule's Institute of Church Music.

Alongside his conducting, Berger has published on choral leadership, music education and the philosophy of music education. His work includes a chapter on choral conductors and leadership in the Routledge volume Leadership and Musician Development in Higher Music Education (2019), and an article on Augustine's concept of memory and its implications for music education in Philosophy of Music Education Review (2024).

== Selected publications ==
- Berger, Martin. "Educing Leadership and Evoking Sound: Choral Conductors as Agents of Change." In Dawn Bennett, Jennifer Rowley and Patrick Schmidt (eds.), Leadership and Musician Development in Higher Music Education. Routledge, 2019, pp. 115–129.
- Berger, Martin; Kertz-Welzel, Alexandra; Lines, David; and Tan, Leonard. "A Humanistic Approach to Music Education: (Critical) International Perspectives." In Iris M. Yob and Estelle R. Jorgensen (eds.), Humane Music Education for the Common Good. Indiana University Press, 2020, pp. 248–260.
- Berger, Martin. "Memoria, Contuitus, et Expectatio: Revisiting Augustine of Hippo." Philosophy of Music Education Review 32, no. 1 (2024): 34–45. doi:10.2979/pme.00005.
