= Martin Bambauer =

German organist and church musician

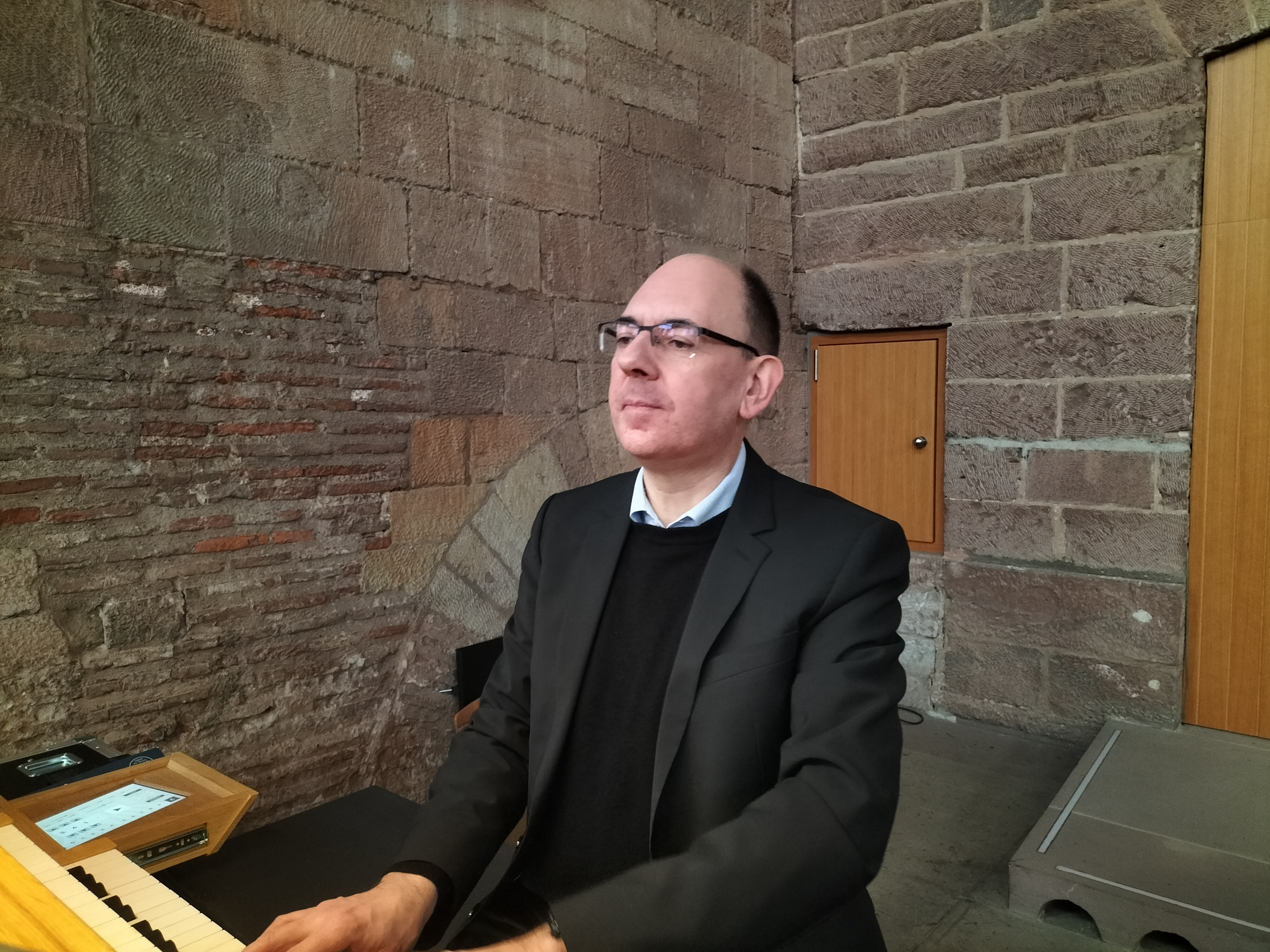
- Martin Bambauer, 2024, Savior Church (Aula Palatina), Trier
- Born: 1970; Wesel, West Germany
- Occupation: Organist

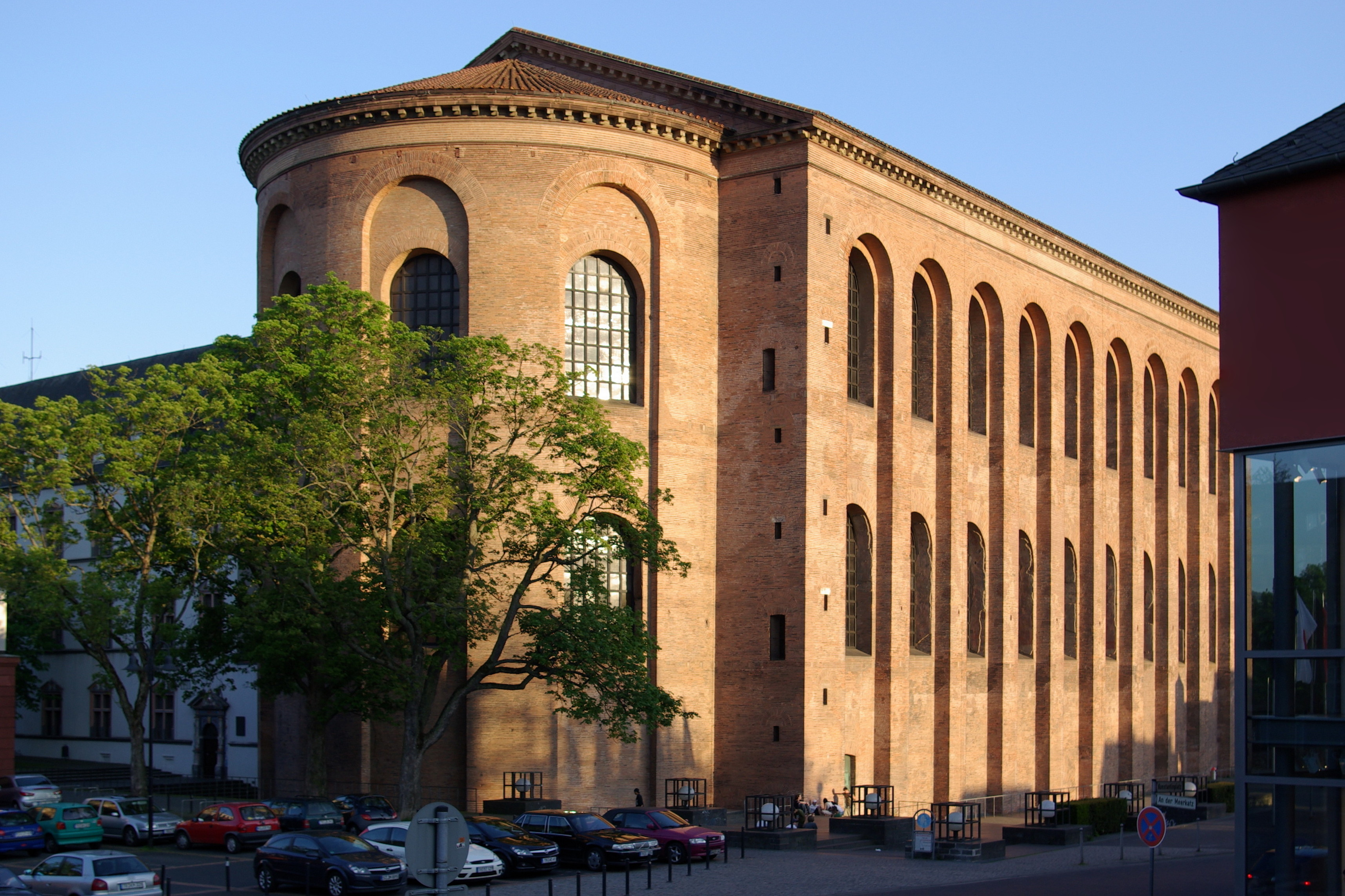
Savior Church (Aula Palatina), Trier

Martin Bambauer (born 1970 in Wesel) is a German organist and church musician.

Bambauer studied church music at the Robert Schumann Hochschule in Düsseldorf with Hans-Dieter Möller and passed his examination with distinction for improvisation. Further he studied with Daniel Roth in Frankfurt am Main and passed the Konzertexamen in 2001. Since 2002 he has been a teacher for organ-improvisation at the Musikhochschule in Köln. Bambauer is organist and choir director at the Basilica of Constantine in Trier.

== Awards ==
- First prize International organ-competition of Elburg (NL)
- First prize for improvisation in Schwäbisch Gmünd

== Discographie ==
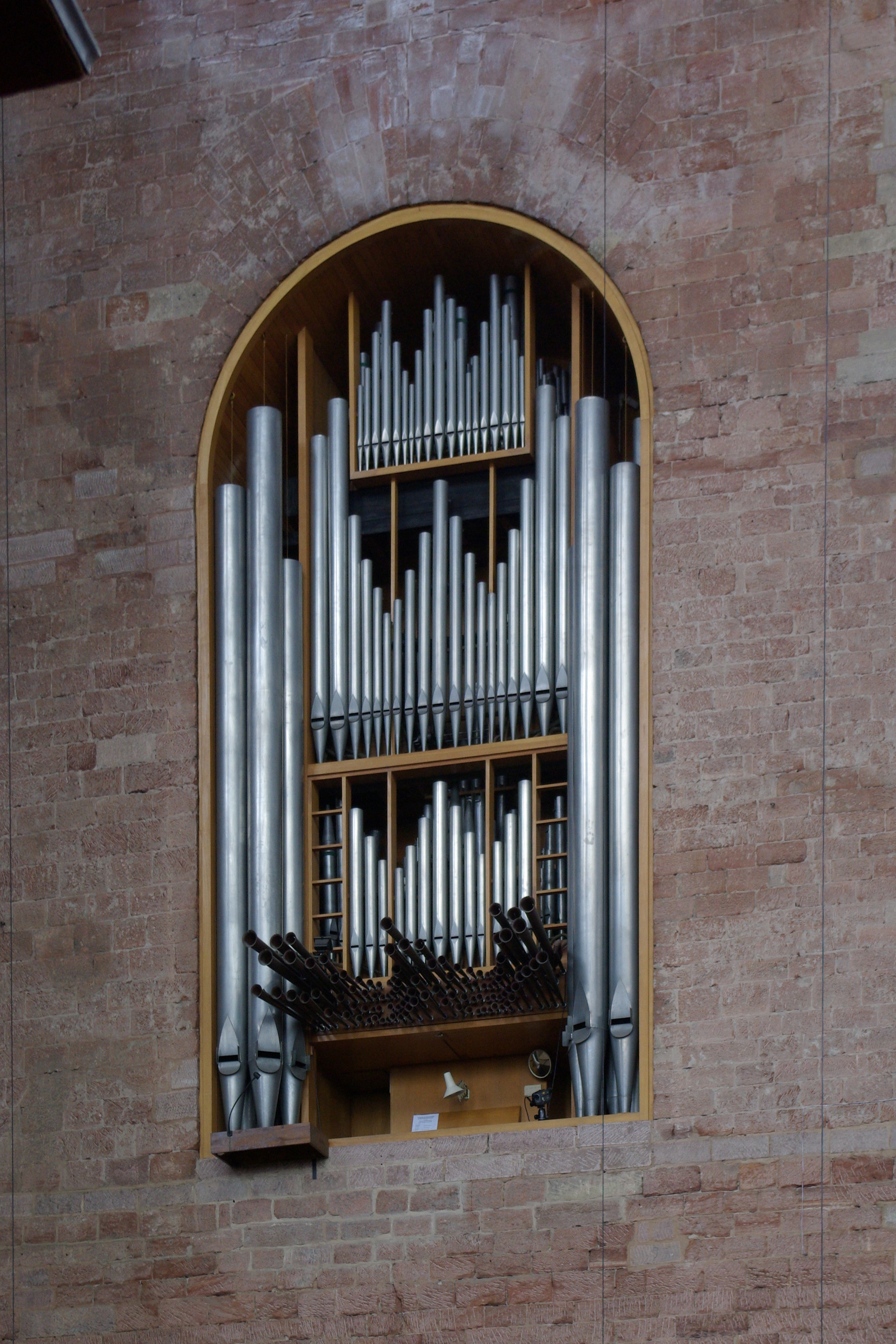
Schuke's organ in the Aula Palatina

- 2001: Orgelmusik aus Fünf Jahrhunderten (Schuke's organ in the Aula Palatina)
- 2004: Franck und Seine Freunde (IFO 00 090)
