= Gregor Horsch =

German cellist and professor

- Born: 1962 (age 62–63); Ettenheim, West Germany
- Genres: Classical
- Occupation(s): Cellist, Professor
- Instrument: Cello
- Years active: 1980s–present
- Member of: Royal Concertgebouw Orchestra

Gregor Horsch (born 1962) is a German cellist. He has been first solo-cellist for the Royal Concertgebouw Orchestra since 1997 and is a professor at Robert Schumann Hochschule in Düsseldorf.

== Biography ==
Horsch was born in Ettenheim, Germany in 1962. He studied at the Hochschule für Musik Freiburg and the Royal Northern College of Music in Manchester, where he graduated with honors. He won the Pierre Fournier Award (1988), the Scheveningen International Music Competition (1989) and the Concours Gaspard Cassado (1990). Prior to his tenure at the Royal Concertgebouw Orchestra, Horsch served as principal cellist for the Het Balletorkest and the Residentie Orchestra. He has also worked as a lecturer at the Conservatorium van Amsterdam and the Royal Conservatory of The Hague.
