= Helmut Kickton =

German church musician

Helmut Kickton (born 28 June 1956 in Cologne, West Germany) is a German church musician, publisher and multi-instrumentalist.

Kickton studied church music at the Robert Schumann Hochschule in Düsseldorf with Hans-Dieter Möller and Hartmut Schmidt. In 1986 he passed his examination (A) with distinction for improvisation and music history. The following years he learned to play most common instruments. He regularly performs on the organ, recorder, violin, viola, cello, double bass, euphonium, guitar and kettledrums.

Since 1987 he has been cantor of the diakonie church in Bad Kreuznach. Together with the kreuznacher-diakonie-kantorei he developed the model of the Integrative Kantorei, which unites voices and instruments. Inspired by historical sources, in 2000 he introduced the layout with the choir in front of the orchestra.

In 2002 he founded the kantoreiarchiv of free digital sheet music. He published more than 20000 files (PDF) for choir, orchestra, brass band, recorder and organ.

== Compositions ==
- Fuge über zwei Kyriethemen für Sequenzer
- Diptychon über „Ave maris stella“ und „Erhalt uns, Herr, bei deinem Wort“
- Postludium
- Intrade für 6 Blechbläser über „Veni Creator Spiritus“

== Gallery ==
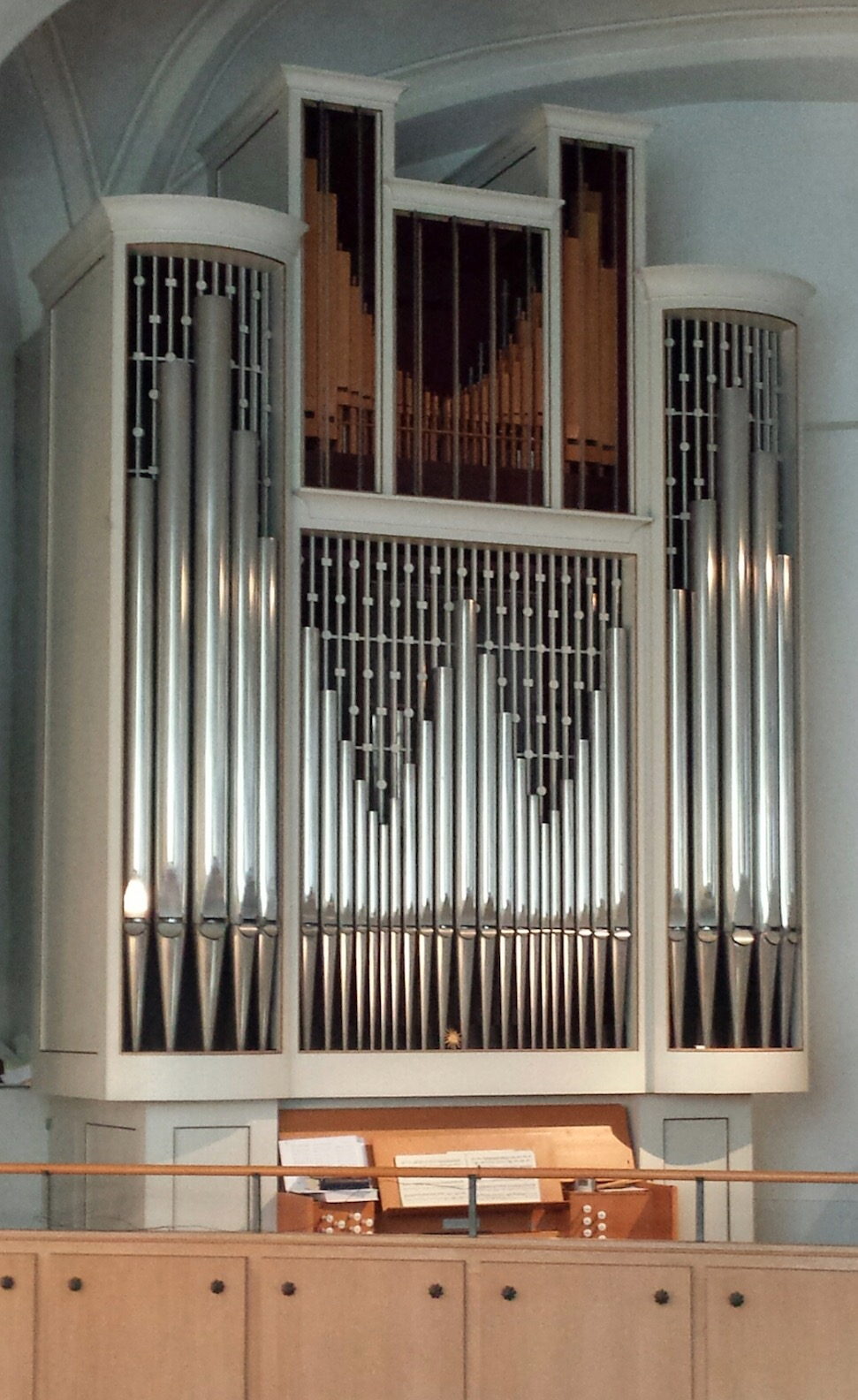
Great organ of the Diakoniekirche

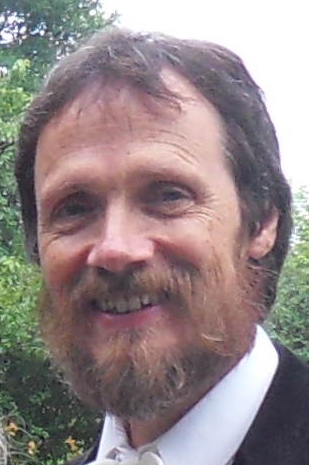
Helmut Kickton

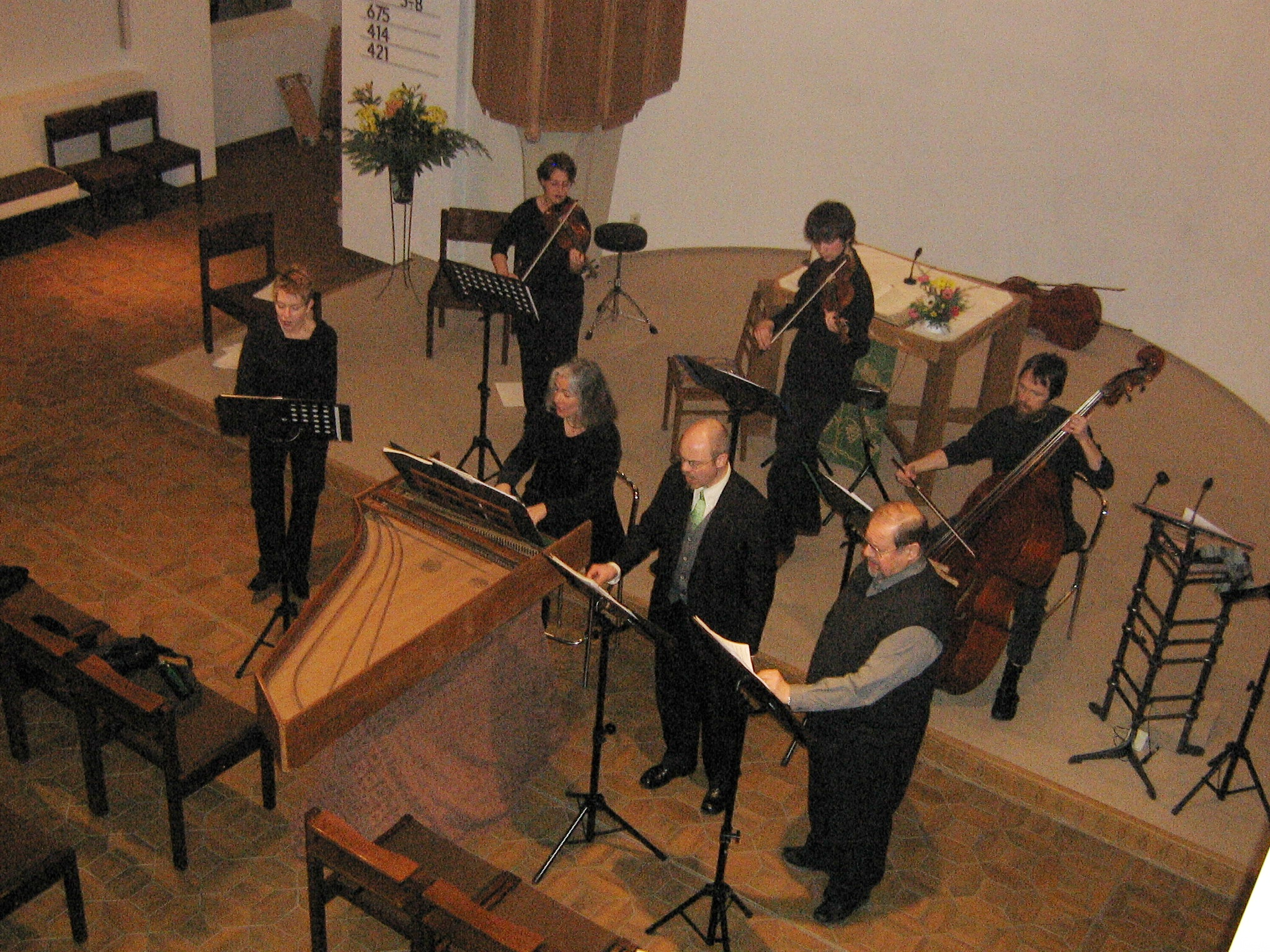
Soloists of the kreuznacher-diakonie-kantorei (Helmut Kickton double bass)

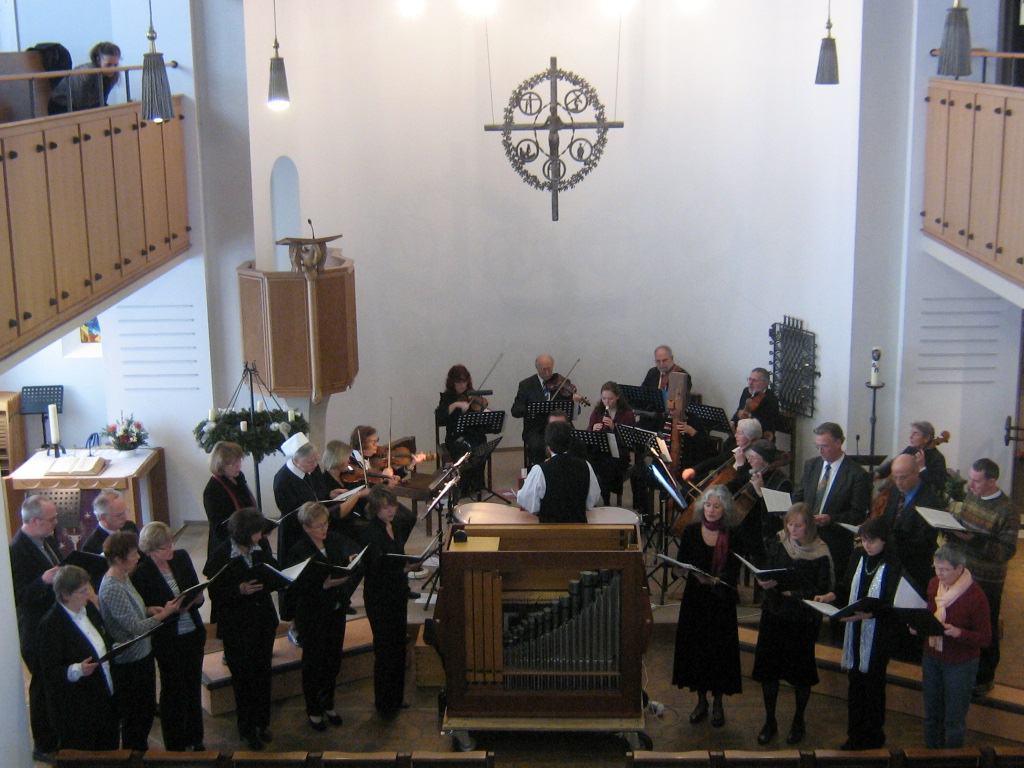
kreuznacher-diakonie-kantorei

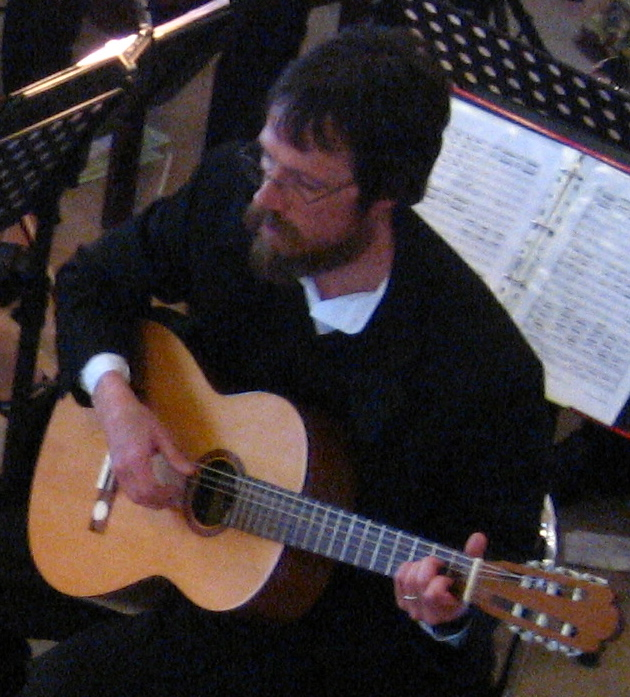
Basso continuo (guitar)
