= Lilian Akopova =

Ukrainian musician (born 1983)

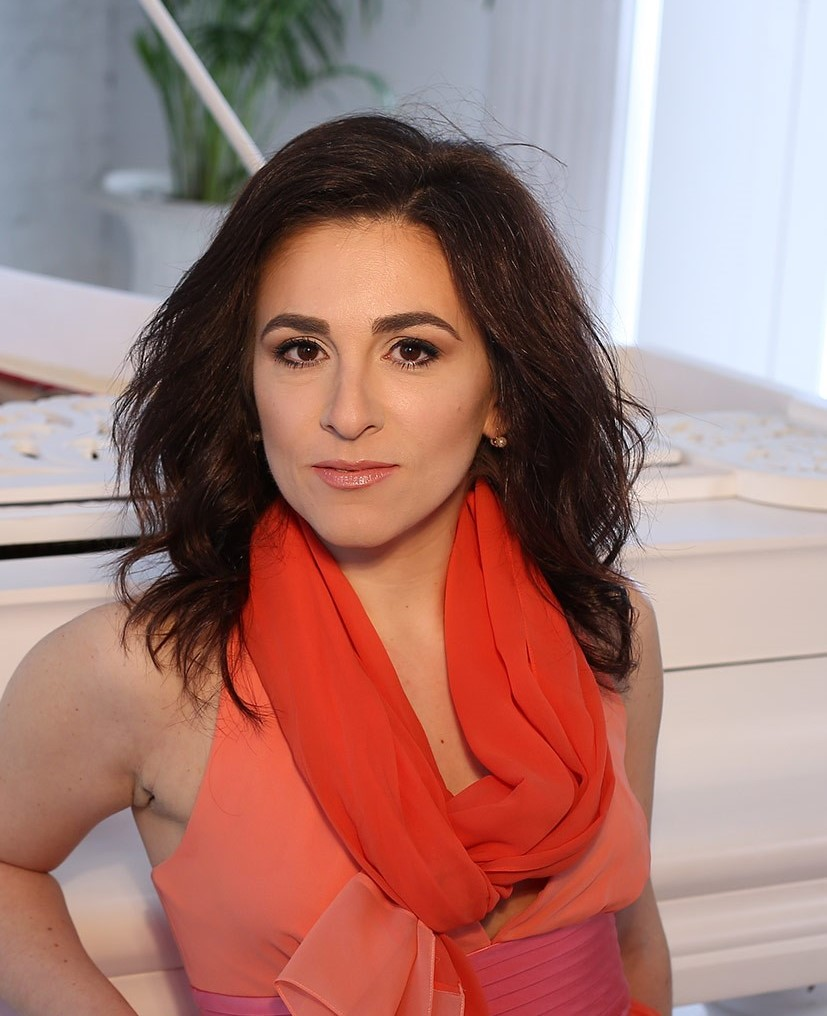
- Akopova in 2017
- Born: June 17, 1983 (age 43); Yerevan, Armenian SSR, Soviet Union
- Education: University of Music and Theatre Munich
- Occupation: Pianist
- Website: lilianakopova.com

Lilian Akopova (born 17 June 1983) is a Ukrainian pianist of Armenian origin. Born in Yerevan, she grew up and received her early musical education in Kyiv. She is a laureate of numerous international piano competitions, including the Vianna da Motta International Music Competition, which she won in 2010, and the Ferruccio Busoni International Piano Competition, where she received third prize in 2007.

== Biography ==
Akopova was born on 17 June 1983 in Yerevan, Armenia. She grew up in Kyiv, where she began her musical education at the Kyiv Lysenko State Music Lyceum, graduating in 2000.

From 2001 to 2007, she studied at the University of Music and Theatre Munich with Eliso Virsaladze. She also participated in master classes with András Schiff and Paul Badura-Skoda. After graduating, she remained in Munich and began teaching at the University of Music and Theatre Munich.

Akopova has received prizes at numerous international piano competitions. Among her major awards are first prize at the International Piano Competition "Roma" in 2005, third prize at the Ferruccio Busoni International Piano Competition in 2007, and first prize at the Vianna da Motta International Music Competition in Lisbon in 2010.

She has performed internationally as a soloist and chamber musician. Her performances have included appearances at major concert venues and festivals in Europe and elsewhere. In 2010, she performed Brahms's Piano Concerto No. 1 with the Gulbenkian Orchestra in Lisbon as part of the final round of the Vianna da Motta International Piano Competition.

In 2010, Akopova released a recording featuring works by Robert Schumann, Felix Mendelssohn and Franz Liszt. In 2014, she received the Echo Klassik award for a recording of Schumann's Carnaval, Op. 9 and Fantasiestücke, Op. 12.

Akopova also teaches piano and chamber music. She has been involved in higher music education since completing her studies and has taught at music institutions in Germany.

She regularly performs chamber music with pianist and conductor Henri Bonamy, with whom she founded a piano duo.

== Awards and prizes ==
- First Prize, International Piano Competition "Roma", Rome, 2005
- Third Prize, Ferruccio Busoni International Piano Competition, Bolzano, 2007
- First Prize, International Piano Competition Città di Carlet, Valencia, 2008
- First Prize, Vianna da Motta International Music Competition, Lisbon, 2010
- Echo Klassik, 2014

== Discography ==
- Lilian Akopova — works by Robert Schumann, Felix Mendelssohn and Franz Liszt, 2010
