= Martin Forciniti =

German church musician and composer

Martin Forciniti (born Wenning 1962 in Horstmar, Westfalen) is a German church musician and composer.

== Life ==
Forciniti studied church music at the Hochschule für Musik Detmold and at the Robert Schumann Hochschule Düsseldorf. He passed the A exam, the concert exam and the music teacher's exam. He first worked as cantor in Steinfurt then as cantor in Niestetal near Kassel until May 2005. He has also been involved in radio and television recordings, including BBC, ARD, WDR and the Hessischer Rundfunk. He was organ expert of the Evangelical Church of Hesse Electorate-Waldeck until July 2006. Furthermore, he conducted the choirs Schola Cantorum Niestetaliensis, Singkreis Kassel-Rothenditmold and the Choir for Sacred Music Niestetal. Since 2009, he has been cantor at the Kurhessisches Diakonissenhaus in Kassel. At the University of Kassel he has a lectureship for the subject organ.

== Compositions ==
- Drei neue geistliche Lieder für mittlere Stimme und Klavier und /oder Band, op. 11
- Der Kreuzweg - 14 Meditationen über die Kreuzwegstationen für große Orgel op. 12
- Arrangement des Soundtracks zum Film "Wie im Himmel" für Klavier
- Fantasie über das Thema EwAlD für Klavier, op. 13
- Toccata festiva über das St. Gertrudis Lied "Du zartes Reis aus edlem Stamm" für große Orgel, op. 14
- Horstmarer Orgelbüchlein (Orgelsätze zum Liedanhang der kath. Kirchengemeinde St. Gertrudis Horstmar)
- Messe für Chor SATB und Orgel, op. 15
- Noll-Tango für Singstimme und Klavier
- Noll-Couplet für Singstimme und Klavier
- 5 Toccaten für Orgel, op. 16 about Lieder of the Protestant Hymnal (EG)
- Postludium über EG 594 (Der Himmel geht über allen auf)
- Liederzyklus "Abseits von Babylon for bass-baritone and piano after texts by Günter Harnisch, op. 17
- Toccata sur un style français, op. 18
- 12 kleine Orgelmeditationen über Abendlieder, op. 19
- Fantasie über "Wachet auf, ruft uns die Stimme" op. 20, for large organ
- Elmshagener Versetten, op. 21
- Beethoven-Apotheken-Couplet für mittlere Stimme und Klavier
- Kinderlieder (for example. Wir bauen Burgen im Sand, Unser erster Schultag)
- Singspiele und Kindermusicals, extract from the series "Die Maus Minimalis":
- Die Maus Minimalis zeigt uns die Instrumente (Elementare Instrumentenkunde mit Begleitheft, Klangbeispielen und CD)
- Die Maus Minimalis erklärt uns, was "Segen" ist, for children of pre-school age
- Krippenspiel "Ein Kind wird heut' geboren", for children of primary school age
- Johannes-Passion op. 25 für Chor SATB, Vorsänger (baritone), Organ and community ad libitum

== Recordings ==
- Musik für Orgel und Horn in der Stiftskirche Kaufungen
- Romantische Reise durch Europa
- Deutsche Lieder aus Böhmen
- Vergessene Lieder (Luise Greger)
