= Andreas Sieling =

German organist and musicologist

Andreas Sieling (born 1964) is a German organist and musicologist.

== Life ==
Born in Oldenburg, Sieling studied musicology, German studies and journalism (doctorate) in Berlin. In Düsseldorf, he continued his education with organ studies at the Robert Schumann Hochschule Düsseldorf with Hans-Dieter Möller. In Halle, he completed the A exam for church music. Sieling teaches as an honorary professor the organ, performance practice and organ methodology at the Berlin University of the Arts. He has been organist at the Berlin Cathedral since 2005.

== Honours ==
The church leadership of the Evangelical Church in Berlin, Brandenburg and Silesian Upper Lusatia conferred the title of "Kirchenmusikdirektor" on Andreas Sieling on 24 April 2020. The certificate was presented by General Superintendent Ulrike Trautwein at the service on 15 November 2020 in the Berlin Cathedral.

== Recordings ==
- Toccata (Berlin Cathedral)
- Französische Romantik (Berlin Cathedral)
- Theophil Laitenberger (Grunewaldkirche Berlin)
- Charles Tournemire: Cinq improvisations; op. 16, op. 19, Dix Pièces (Berlin Cathedral)
- Guilmant, Wermann, Lubrich, Dienel, Liszt (Heilig-Geist-Kirche Rostock)
- Jan Janca (Kaiser-Wilhelm-Gedächtniskirche Berlin)
- Alte Meister (Berlin Cathedral)
