= Basilica of St. Vitus, Mönchengladbach =

Coordinates: 51°11′33″N 6°25′54″E

Basilica of St. Vitus
- Münster-Basilika St. Vitus
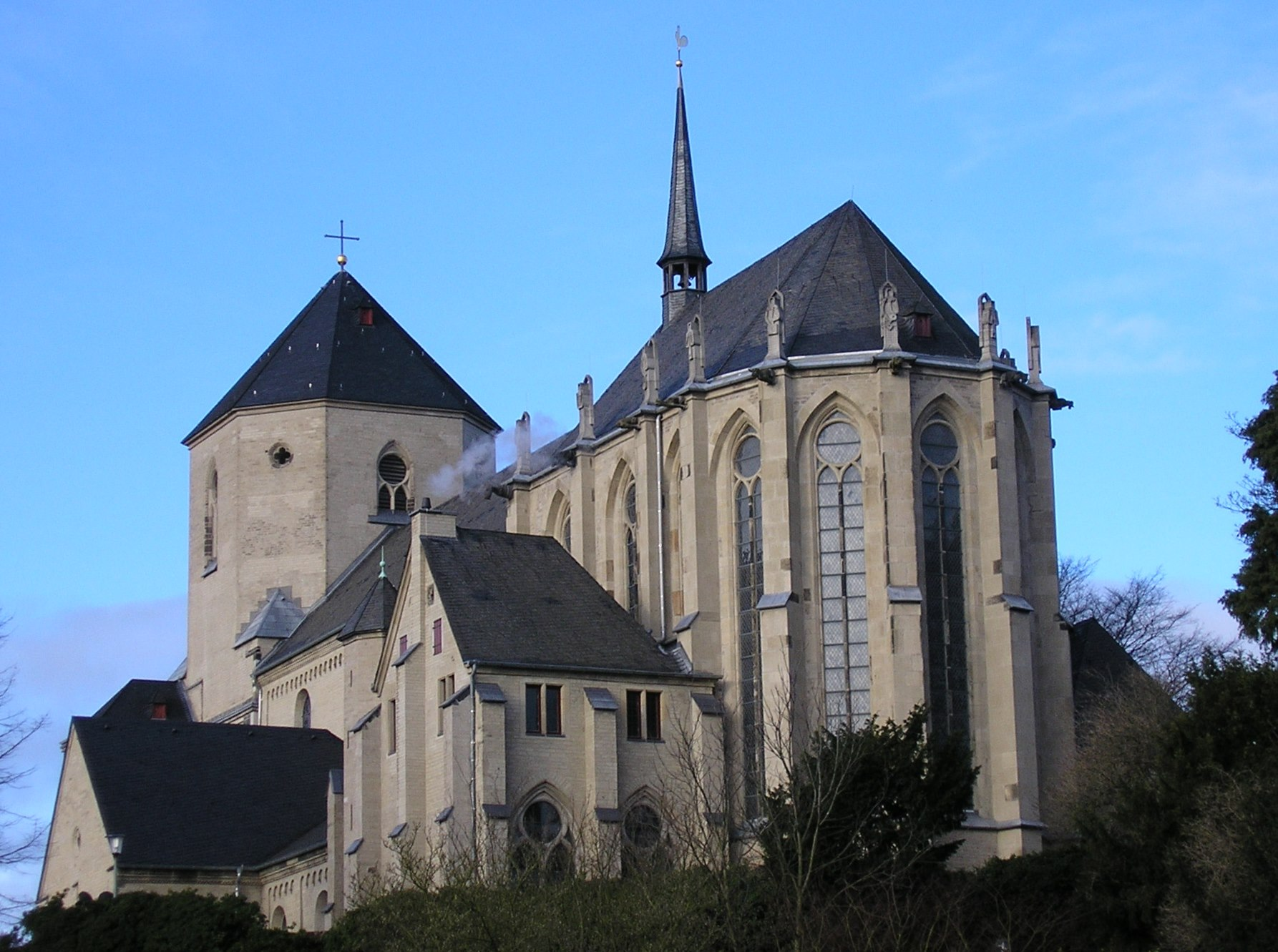
- Basilica of St. Vitus
- Location: Mönchengladbach
- Country: Germany
- Denomination: Roman Catholic Church

The Basilica of St. Vitus (German: Münster-Basilika St. Vitus ) also called Mönchengladbach Basilica Is a Catholic church in Mönchengladbach in Germany. An old Benedictine monastery, Pope Paul VI elevated it in 1973 to the rank of Minor Basilica.

The first true knowledge about the foundation of the abbey dates back to a document from the late 11th century, probably from the scriptorium of the monastery of Gladbach. This richly illuminated document reports that a nobleman long before the founding of the abbey would have erected a church on the top of the hill, a church destroyed by the Magyars in 954.

In 1120, at the latest, the monastery was affected by the Benedictine reform Siegburg. It was between 1228 and 1239 the nave of the abbey took its definitive form. Between 1256 and 1277, while reconstruction was developing, the idea of building a new choir appeared, but on a different plane (the typical elongated choir of the Gothic style). In order to carry out this plan, Master Gerhard, the first architect of Cologne Cathedral brought to his experience. Albert the Great consecrated the abbey on April 28, 1275.

== See also ==
- Roman Catholicism in Germany
- St. Vitus Cathedral

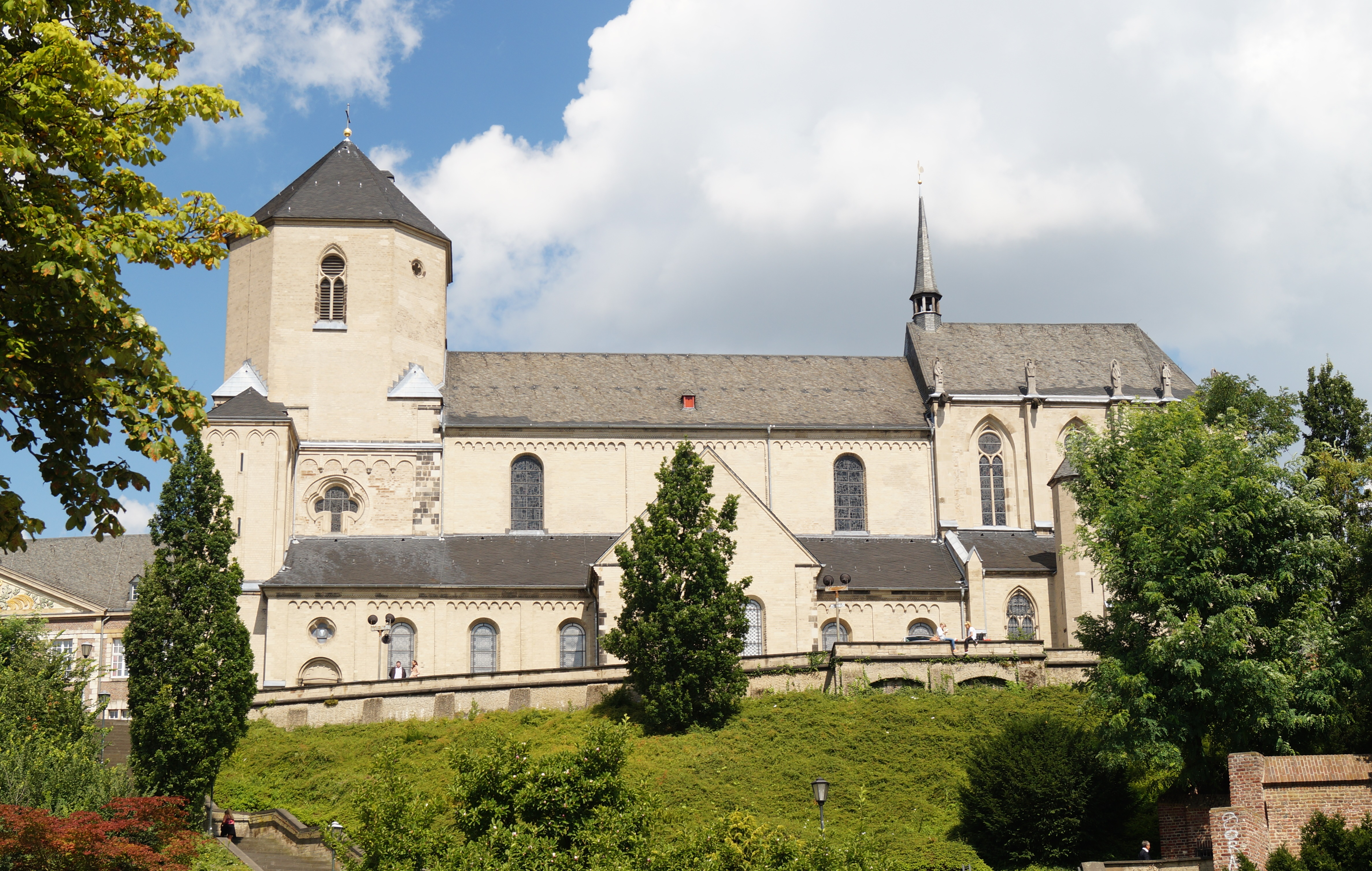
Another View
