= Robert Schumann Hochschule =

School for music studies in Düsseldorf, Germany

Coordinates: 51°14′32″N 6°46′19″E

Robert Schumann Hochschule logo

Robert Schumann Hochschule is a school for music studies at university level in Düsseldorf, Germany. It has a student body of some 850 from over forty countries. Forty-seven full-time and part-time faculty and two hundred associate professors provide individual instruction.

== History ==
In 1935 three private music schools were merged into the Robert Schumann Conservatorium, named after the composer Robert Schumann, who lived in Düsseldorf for some years.

In 1972 the state of North Rhine-Westphalia became the body responsible for the music college. It became part of the public college for music in the Rhineland. In 1987 it became an independent college and was given its current name.

== Studies ==
The programs of study offered by the Robert Schumann Hochschule cover the entire range of music professions. Music, the largest of the programs of study, focuses on performance: Anyone who studies piano or violin, guitar or clarinet, composition or voice in Düsseldorf learns to perform together with other musicians in orchestras and ensembles. That is why degree programs include many performance opportunities: The University Orchestra regularly performs at Düsseldorf's Tonhalle symphony hall and, in close collaboration with the Deutsche Oper am Rhein, opera voice majors show off their talent in an annual staged opera production.

The Musikvermittlung (Music Promotion) degree program includes majors in Music Education, Conducting, Ear Training, and Church Music. Social and pedagogical competency play an important role in all majors. For instance, a church music major not only has to play the organ but also be able to lead a choir and to make music with children and young people. Work with laypeople is also the goal of the music education degree program, where education majors are prepared for a career as teachers in music schools.

Despite the considerable amount of work on performance, theory is not neglected. The musicology faculty carry on research in historical and systematic musicology. They organize scientific symposia and publish a series of scholarly papers. A special role is played by the Institute of Music and Media which concentrates on the practical training of students for careers in media and the music industry. Majors such as Media Composition, Music and Media, Media Dramaturgy and Management provide excellent training for work in these specialized fields. The program of studies Audio and Video, offered in cooperation with the University of Applied Sciences Düsseldorf, combines studies in engineering with formal conservatory training. Düsseldorf is the only university to offer this major in Germany.

Cooperation with the German Armed Forces Music Training corps, which began in 1976, is also unique. Every professional musician in Germany's armed forces has a degree from the Robert Schumann Hochschule. The Bundeswehr prepares soldiers for the entrance exam and later employs the trained musicians.

== The Rometsch-Competition ==
The Rometsch-Wettbewerb (Rometsch-Competition) is an internal competition for soloists and chamber music. The competition is highly regarded in the classical music world and awards a cumulative 9,000 Euro prize.

== Notable teachers ==
- Andreas Ballstaedt (musicology)
- Martin Berger (choral conducting)
- Ida Bieler (violin)
- Juliane Banse (voice)
- Andrej Bielow (violin)
- Dagmar Birwe (music production)
- Rüdiger Bohn (conducting)
- Barbara Buntrock (violin)
- Joaquín Clerch (classical guitar)
- Michael Denhoff (chamber music)
- Hans Eijsackers (Lied interpretation)
- Lisa Eisner-Smirnova (piano)
- Konrad Jarnot (voice)
- Dieter Falk (pop music)
- Michael Faust (flute)
- Thomas Gabrisch (opera class)
- Paolo Giacometti (piano)
- Ludwig Grabmeier (voice)
- Andreas Grimm (composition)
- Matthias Gromer (trombone)
- Gregor Horsch (cello)
- Volker Kalisch (musicology)
- Jürgen Kursawa (organ)
- Andreas Langenbuch (clarinet)
- Thorsten Laux (organ)
- Thomas Leander (piano)
- Gustavo Nunez (bassoon)
- Timo Nuoranne (choral conducting)
- Peter Mönkedieck (trumpet)
- Joachim Poeltl (horn)
- Alexander-Sergei Ramirez (classical guitar)
- Hans-Peter Reutter (music theory)
- Julian Rohrhuber (music informatics)
- Werner Roth (music production)
- Wolfgang Rüdiger (music education)
- Georg Friedrich Schenck (piano)
- André Sebald (flute)
- Heike Sperling (visual music)
- Rick Stotijn (contrabass)
- Manfred Trojahn (composition)
- Raimund Wippermann (choral conducting)
- Pieter Wispelwey (cello)
- Markus Wittgens (horn)
- Frank Zabel (music theory)
- Sándor Végh (violin)
- Jeannette Zarou (voice)

== Notable students ==
- Martin Bambauer (1970)
- Karl Bartos (1952)
- Martin Berger (1972)
- Björn Bobach (1973)
- Measha Brueggergosman (1977)
- Oscar van Dillen (1958)
- Klaus Doldinger (1936)
- Hermin Esser
- Helmut Freitag
- Mechthild Georg
- Manuel Gera
- Roland Haerdtner (1964)
- Ralf Hütter (1946)
- Helmut Kickton (1956)
- Leonore Kirschstein
- Reinhard Kluth
- Tobias Koch (1968)
- Ulrich Leykam (1948)
- Johannes Quack (1959)
- Maria Radner
- Walter Ratzek (1960)
- Fazıl Say (1970)
- Martin Schmeding (1975)
- Carola Gräfin von Schmettow (1989)
- Andreas Schmidt (1960)
- Florian Schneider-Esleben (1947)
- Wolfgang Seifen
- Vera Schoenenberg
- Alexander Shelley
- Andreas Sieling
- Jürgen Sonnentheil
- Bernd Wiesemann (1938)
- Martin Forciniti (1962)

== See also ==
- Robert Schumann
