= Kolja Lessing =

German violinist, pianist and composer

- Born: 15 October 1961 (age 64); Karlsruhe, West Germany
- Occupations: Violinist; Pianist; Composer; Academic teacher
- Organizations: Hochschule für Musik Würzburg; University of Music and Theatre Leipzig; State University of Music and Performing Arts Stuttgart
- Awards: Johann Wenzel Stamitz Preis; Deutscher Kritikerpreis; Order of Merit of the Federal Republic of Germany

Kolja Lessing (born 15 October 1961) is a German violinist, pianist, composer and academic teacher. His focus as a soloist and chamber musician has been the neglected repertoire by composers who were ostracised under the Nazi regime. His recordings include four volumes of works by students of Franz Schreker in his master classes in Vienna and Berlin.

Lessing has taught violin at the Hochschule für Musik Würzburg and the University of Music and Theatre Leipzig, and has been professor at the State University of Music and Performing Arts Stuttgart from 2000. He has been awarded numerous honours, especially for his dedication to the music of neglected composers.

== Life ==
Lessing was born in Karlsruhe. He received his basic music education from his mother. From 1978, he attended the violin master class of Hansheinz Schneeberger in Basel. There, he also studied piano with Peter Efler from 1979. He passed his concert examinations in 1982 and 1983. He also received formative impulses through his collaboration with Berthold Goldschmidt, Ignace Strasfogel and Zoltán Székely.

As a professor of violin, he taught at the Hochschule für Musik Würzburg from 1989 to 1993, at the University of Music and Theatre Leipzig from 1993, and followed a call to the State University of Music and Performing Arts Stuttgart in 2000. From 1998 to 2015, he was a regular guest lecturer at the Banff Centre for Arts and Creativity.

Lessing has performed worldwide as a violinist and pianist, also giving musicological lectures and master classes at European and North American universities.

Lessing has dedicated to wide-ranging repertoire, with a focus on works by composers who were ostracised under the Nazi regime, including Franz Schreker and his circle of students. He revived stylistically different compositions for solo violin by Haim Alexander, Tzvi Avni, Abel Ehrlich, Jacqueline Fontyn, David Paul Graham, Ursula Mamlok, Krzysztof Meyer, Klaus Hinrich Stahmer, Hans Vogt. Berthold Goldschmidt composed a work for him that he premiered. As a violinist and a pianist, he premiered compositions including the piano concerto Rivages solitaires by Jacqueline Fontyn, Rudolf Hindemith's Suite, Ignace Strasfogel's A Child's Day, the violin concertos by Haim Alexander, Sidney Corbett's Yael, works by Abel Ehrlich and Stefan Hippe, Zoltán Székely's Allegro, A une Madone by Dimitri Terzakis, and Le Violon de la Mort by Grete von Zieritz.

== Recordings ==
Lessing has recorded extensively both with violin and piano, including numerous first and complete recordings, also with a focus on neglected composers. He made a series of four CDs of music by composers who studied with Schreker, both as violinist and as pianist.

- Johann Paul von Westhoff: Complete Suites for Solo Violin (Capriccio)
- Georg Philipp Telemann: 12 Fantasias for Solo Violin (Capriccio)
- Ernst von Gemmingen: Complete Violin Concertos (cpo)
- Carl Czerny: The Art of Preluding, Op. 300 (cpo)
- Max Reger: Complete Works for Violin and Orchestra, Göttingen Symphony Orchestra, cond: Christoph-Mathias Mueller (telos music)
- Reger: Complete chamber music with Clarinet (Oehms)
- Ignace Strasfogel: Complete Piano Works (Decca)
- Franz Reizenstein: Solo Sonatas for Piano, Viola and for Violin (eda records)
- Franz Schreker's Masterclasses in Vienna and Berlin, vol. 1-4, with works by Karol Rathaus, Jerzy Fitelberg, Grete von Zieritz, Wilhelm Grosz, Vladas Jakubėnas, Berthold Goldschmidt, Zdenka Ticharich, Kurt Fiebig, Alexander Ecklebe, Felix Petyrek, Hugo Herrmann, Leon Klepper and Isco Thaler (eda records)

== Compositions ==
Compositions by Lessing are held by the German National Library, including:

- Sonata for clarinet solo 1978
- Two duos for clarinet and violin: The Journey into the Unknown 1979, The Beauty of a Dream 1980
- Gliding Figures for flute and viola 1998
- Sinking Mists for flute and alto flute 1998

Lessing wrote cadenzas to Mozart's violin concertos K. 218 and K. 219, and to all violin concertos by Ernst von Gemmingen.

== Awards ==
- 1999 Johann-Wenzel-Stamitz-Preis, special prize for his commitment to ostracised Jewish composers
- 2008 Deutscher Kritikerpreis
- 2015 Otto-Hirsch-Auszeichnung of Stuttgart
- 2020 Order of Merit of the Federal Republic of Germany for his merit for ostracised composers
