= Würzburg Cultural Prize =

The Würzburg Cultural Prize (Kulturpreis der Stadt Würzburg) is an award by the city of Würzburg. It is awarded to people who are connected to Würzburg by birth, life or work and who worked towards its cultural life ("... eine durch Geburt, Leben oder Werk mit der Stadt Würzburg verbundene Persönlichkeit (bzw. eine Künstlergruppe/Ensemble o. ä.) erhalten, die durch ihr künstlerisches Schaffen herausragend gewirkt oder sich in besonderer Weise um das kulturelle Leben der Stadt verdient gemacht hat").

== Recipients ==
Recipients have included:

- 1965: Friedrich Schnack, writer
- 1966: Emy Roeder, sculptor and artist
- 1967: Eugen Jochum, conductor
- 1968: Fritz Koenig, sculptor
- 1970: Günter Jena, organist and choral director
- 1971: Josef Versl, artist
- 1972: Hans Schädel, architect
- 1973: Luigi Malipiero, actor and artist
- 1974: Otto Sonnleitner, Bildhauer
- 1975: Richard Rother, artist
- 1976: Heinrich Pleticha, author
- 1977: Wolfgang Lenz, artist
- 1978: Rudolf Köckert, musician
- 1979: Max Hermann von Freeden, museum director
- 1980: Werner Dettelbacher, author
- 1981: Yehuda Amichai, poet
- 1984: Wilhelm Greiner, artist
- 1985: Siegfried Fink, percussionist
- 1986: Siegfried Koesler, cathedral music director
- 1987: Waltraud Meier, mezzo-soprano
- 1988: Bertold Hummel, composer
- 1989: Reinhard Dachlauer, sculptor
- 1990: Lothar C. Forster, sculptor
- 1991: Curd Lessig, artist
- 1992: Dieter Stein, artist
- 1994: Klaus Hinrich Stahmer, musician and composer
- 1996: Joachim Koch, sculptor
- 1998: Hans-Georg Noack, author
- 2000: Norbert Glanzberg, composer
- 2002: Frank Markus Barwasser, cabarettist
- 2004: Christian Kabitz, church music director
- 2006: Bernd Glemser, pianist
- 2007: Herbert Mehler, sculptor
- 2009: Jürgen Lenssen
- 2010: Diana Damrau, soprano
- 2012: Mathias Repiscus, stage director
- 2014: Angelika Summa, sculptor
- 2015: Hans Ulrich Gumbrecht, literary theorist
- 2017: Klaus Ospald, composer
- 2018: Michael Wollny, pianist
- 2020: Elvira Lantenhammer, painter
- 2021: Birgit Süß, cabarettist
- 2023: Monteverdichor Würzburg, conductor Matthias Beckert
- 2024: Thomas Glasmeyer, theater with puppets
- 2025: Frank Zauritz, photographer
