= Hans Ulrich Gumbrecht =

Humanities scholar

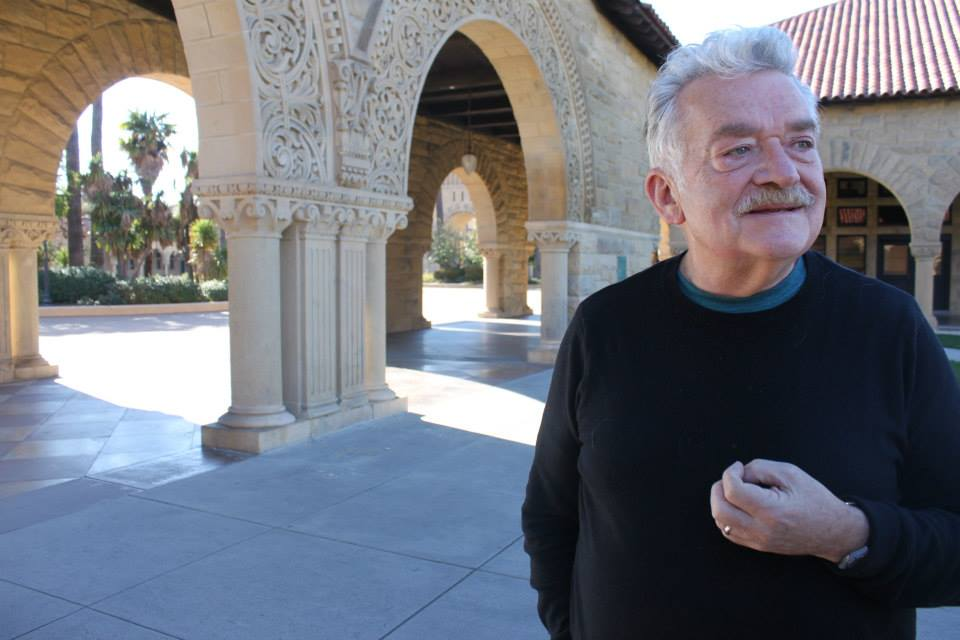
- Professor Gumbrecht in Stanford's Quad
- Born: 15 June 1948 (age 78); Würzburg, Germany

Philosophical work
- Era: Contemporary philosophy
- Region: Western philosophy
- School: Continental philosophy
- Institutions: Stanford University
- Main interests: Western philosophy, European and Latin American literature, sport
- Website: dlcl.stanford.edu/people/hans-ulrich-gumbrecht

Hans Ulrich "Sepp" Gumbrecht (born 15 June 1948) is a German-born American literary theorist whose work spans philology, philosophy, semiotics, literary and cultural history, and epistemologies of the everyday. As of June 14, 2018, he is Albert Guérard Professor Emeritus in Literature at Stanford University. Since 1989, he held the Albert Guérard Chair as Professor in the Departments of Comparative literature and French and Italian in Stanford's Division of Literatures, Languages, and Cultures. By courtesy, he was also affiliated with the Departments of German studies, Iberian and Latin American Cultures, and the Program in Modern Thought and Literature. Since retirement, he continues to be a Catedratico Visitante Permanente at the University of Lisbon and became a Presidential Professor at the Hebrew University of Jerusalem in 2020.

Gumbrecht's writing on philosophy and modern thought extends from the Middle Ages to today and incorporates an array of disciplines and styles, at times combining historical and philosophical inquiry with elements of memoir. Much of Gumbrecht's scholarship has focused on national literatures in French, Spanish, Portuguese, and German, and he is known for his work on the Western philosophical tradition, the materiality of presence, shifting views of the Enlightenment, forms of aesthetic experience, and the joys of watching sports.

== Life and education ==
Born on June 15, 1948, in Würzburg, Germany, Gumbrecht graduated from the Siebold Gymnasium of his hometown in 1967, also having studied at Lycée Henri IV in Paris. He specialized in Romance Philology and German literature, but also studied philosophy and sociology during his university years, which took him to Munich, Regensburg, Salamanca, Pavia, and Konstanz. After receiving his PhD at the University of Konstanz in 1971, he became assistant professor, acquiring the Venia legendi (Habilitation) in Romance Literatures and Literary Theory in 1974.

Gumbrecht was a Full Professor at the University of Bochum from 1975 to 1982, and from 1983 to 1989 at the University Siegen, where he founded the first Humanities Graduate Program in Germany, which was dedicated to the topic "Forms of Communication as Forms of Life." From 1983 to 1985, Gumbrecht was Vice President of the German Association of Romance Philology.

Having been offered the Albert Guérard Chair at Stanford University, he moved to Palo Alto in 1989. While at Stanford he has taught classes to graduate and undergraduate students, advised over 100 dissertations and honors theses, and continued to publish regularly.

On February 9–10, 2018, a conference titled "After 1967: Methods and Moods in Literary Studies in Honor of Hans Ulrich Gumbrecht" was held at Stanford to commemorate Gumbrecht's fifty-year career. Over forty scholars of theory, philosophy, and literary studies who had worked with Gumbrecht attended the conference. Stanford football coach David Shaw also attended.

As an Emeritus, Gumbrecht continues to write, participate in campus life, and meet with students.

== Scholarly work ==
=== Stimmung, or cultural moods ===
Gumbrecht has written extensively on "Stimmung", a German word also referencing the tuning of musical instruments, but more commonly meaning "mood" and as such used by Gumbrecht to indicate the mood or atmosphere of a particular era or artistic work. He has used this theme to write about both daily life on a broad cultural scale and interpretative practices in the humanities.

By identifying specific moods as temporal in nature, he attempts to capture the spirit of particular time periods and to recreate how they were experienced by people living at those times. He does so by examining how everyday activities, material and aesthetic experiences, and reading processes shape individual and cultural understandings of the world.

Gumbrecht's first work to locate a temporal mood was In 1926: Living at the Edge of Time (1997), which associates excitement and anticipation with the emergence of new and faster-paced activities, forms of entertainment, and ways of thinking. The book presents fragments of life from various geographical locations, large-scale events and private practices, and perspectives of both celebrities and ordinary individuals. Events described range from boxing matches to bar conversations, and Gumbrecht profiles artistic greats and public figures alongside workers, farmers, and engineers to depict the emergence of new sensibilities that transcended boundaries of class, race, gender, or nation.

In After 1945: Latency as Origin of the Present (2013), Gumbrecht explores the legacy of World War II through an investigation of a widespread cultural mood, primarily in Germany but also relating to a broader response to the aftermath of war. He describes a climate (Stimmung) in which "a disposition of violent nervousness permeates the seemingly quiet postwar world, which points to a latent state of affairs." The mood of latency has implications for cultural identity today in the form of a widely felt sense of inertia and a changed relationship to time: the argument is that from the vantage point of the postwar years, the future came to be viewed as a threat.

While these are two of Gumbrecht's more detailed elaborations on temporal moods, Stimmung relates also to a broader concept of moods that can be triggered by aesthetic experiences to produce a sense of "presence." Gumbrecht elaborates this theme further in his works about the material component of literary study.

=== Presence and materiality ===
Through the concept of Stimmung, Gumbrecht has argued that certain cultural events and aesthetic experiences can become "present," or have a tangible effect on human senses, emotions, and bodies. This idea underlies Gumbrecht's writing about literary criticism and methods of interpretation, and also much of his other work on material forms of culture, communication, and understanding in the 20th and 21st centuries. Presence is a central concept to many of his books, including In 1926: Living on the Edge of Time (1998), Production of Presence: What Meaning Cannot Convey (2003), The Powers of Philology: Dynamics of Textual Scholarship (2003), Atmosphere, Mood, Stimmung: On a Hidden Potential of Literature (2012), After 1945: Latency as Origin of the Present (2013), and Our Broad Present: Time and Contemporary Culture (2014).

Throughout his writing, Gumbrecht emphasizes the importance of material experience to consuming literature and art. In Atmosphere, Mood, Stimmung: On a Hidden Potential of Literature (2012), Gumbrecht applies the concept of mood to the process of reading literary works. He argues that the function of literature is to "make present," and treats aesthetic experiences as concrete encounters that affect a reader or viewer's physical environment or body.

By connecting presence to art, especially the art of literature, in his description of language as a material component of the world, Gumbrecht returns to his roots in the study of philology, moving beyond Deconstruction's concept of language. He writes, "'Reading for Stimmung' always means paying attention to the textual dimension of the forms that envelop us and our bodies as a physical reality—something that can catalyze inner feelings without matters of representation necessarily being involved."

Focusing on the atmosphere produced by a work of literature and experienced by the work's reader, he argues, is crucial to the intellectual practice of reading and analyzing literature.

In a 2006 interview with Gumbrecht, Ulrik Ekman describes Gumbrecht's work on presence as an "extremely intricate oscillation between a move, perhaps unavoidable, towards epistemological sense-making and conceptualization on the one hand, and, on the other, an at least formally opening move in the direction of ontological concerns." Gumbrecht links the practice of interpretation as the search for meaning or "sense-making" with a form of understanding that is unique to the social and historical context, as well as the material and bodily experience, of the reader.

=== Critique of the literary analytical tradition ===
Gumbrecht's focus on presence in the reading of literature is significant for his elaboration of a "post-hermeneutic" form of literary criticism. He has argued that the emphasis on interpretation in academic intellectual practices is incomplete, and that the "meaning-only" model of understanding it produces does not account for the subjective experience of the arts.

In Production of Presence (2003), Gumbrecht criticizes the status of literary study in university settings, arguing that the humanities overemphasize the importance of interpretation, or "the reconstruction and attribution of meaning." Instead, he argues for an intellectual practice that would take into account the importance of "presence," or material engagement with the artistic works being examined.

Gumbrecht traces the emphasis on meaning and interpretation back to Early Modernity, drawing from Martin Heidegger's concept of "Being" and commenting on the work of many other scholars, including Jacques Derrida's writing on overcoming metaphysics. Gumbrecht critiques the emphasis on reason and rationality that originated with the Age of Enlightenment, and in particular, references Immanuel Kant's Critique of Pure Reason, Critique of Practical Reason, and Critique of Judgment, as well as the Cartesian tendency to exclude presence from metaphysics. These modes of conceptualization have become ingrained in philosophical analysis and other intellectual inquiry in the humanities.

Gumbrecht highlights the importance of modes of "world-appropriation" that do not focus on locating or discerning meaning. He describes three principal methods meant to define the future, non-hermeneutical function of the humanities. These are epiphany, presentification, and deixis. Epiphany refers to a moment of intensity or loss of control related to viewing an artistic work; presentification refers to immersing oneself in the past moment of the artwork's production; deixis involves the "lived experience" of artistic work, rather than the imposition of meaning.

Gumbrecht rehearses these concepts most centrally in Production of Presence, but his critique of the legacy of Enlightenment thinking and its influence on literary criticism and hermeneutics informs other works by Gumbrecht as well. Most recently, his monograph on Denis Diderot posits that Diderot embodies an 18th-century style of thinking that diverges from more canonized Enlightenment philosophies.

=== The aesthetics of sport ===
Gumbrecht has also written on the spectatorship of sport, using philosophy and the history of athletics to present an analytical perspective on the precise ways sport is consumed and appreciated. Most notably in his book In Praise of Athletic Beauty (2006), but also in articles such as "Epiphany of Form: On the Beauty of Team Sports" and interviews with newspapers and academic sources, he examines the widespread cultural fascination with athletics in the 21st century and in historical contexts.

Gumbrecht's project is to provide a new mode for exploring and understanding the aesthetic experience of sports spectatorship, or what precisely makes certain athletic moves and plays "beautiful." In his discussion of the ways beauty can be ascribed to athletes' actions, Gumbrecht describes the effect of perceiving athletes to be "lost in focused intensity," and how the players' physical presence and performance of ability lead the spectator—or "everyfan"—to attribute meaning to athletes' movements, but also to feel affected emotionally.

Among other elements, Gumbrecht also presents as key elements of spectatorship the importance of styles of communication and sociality among fans and the spectators' sense of gratitude toward players. That gratitude is sparked by "special moments of intensity" when athletes appear to go beyond the limits of human performance—which, in Ancient Greek culture, was seen as occurring in the presence of the gods. This often means successful performance, but can also relate to the suffering, pain, and loss also experienced in the sporting arena.

Gumbrecht's writing on sport interconnects with his concepts of presence and materiality insofar as the activity of watching takes on a communal character, offering spectators "opportunities to immerse themselves in the realm of presence." Gumbrecht cites Friedrich Nietzsche's distinction between Dionysian and Apollonian attitudes, where the Dionysian spectator tends "to revel in communion both with other spectators and with the energy that emerges from the action they are following," while the Apollonian spectator "has a greater affinity with the concept of analysis than with the concept of communion." While Gumbrecht does not present one form as superior to the other, he notes the contemporary tendency to attach social anxiety to the frenzy of crowds, linking this to "the nightmare of Fascism still haunting the West."

Gumbrecht acknowledges the occurrence of fights and hooliganism at sporting events, but focuses instead on the sense of communion that watching athletics can produce—for example, through acts of cheering, chanting, or even doing "the Wave." Though he asks how modern media technology has changed the viewing habits of sports fans, his focus is on the sensation of presence—even if that presence is produced through the illusion of the screen. The energy of the crowd, in combination with the other aesthetic and emotional responses evoked by watching athletic aptitude, leads to the range of "fascinations" Gumbrecht incorporates into his method for describing and expressing appreciation for sport.

=== Other writing ===
In addition to his work on presence, materiality, and hermeneutics in the humanities, Gumbrecht's main areas of research, teaching, and publishing include:

- European literature of the Middle Ages and of the late 18th and 19th centuries;
- the history and critique of Western metaphysics;
- history and pragmatics of communication media; and,
- the epistemology of everyday culture.

Gumbrecht's publications are extensive and in many languages. He wrote primarily in German during his early career, and in English after moving to the United States in 1989. He also writes in Spanish and Portuguese, and his works are regularly translated into French, Hungarian, Korean, Russian, and several other languages.

== Affiliations and responsibilities ==
In addition to teaching at Stanford, Gumbrecht is affiliated with other universities and is a visiting professor or associate professor at institutions worldwide. He is an instructor and board member at the School of Criticism and Theory at Cornell University, a Fellow at the Carl Friedrich von Siemens Foundation in Munich and at the Institute for Advanced Study in Berlin, and a Fellow of the American Academy of Arts and Sciences. He was also associate professor of Comparative Literature at the University of Montréal, Professeur Attaché at Collège de France, and an Affiliate Professor at the School for Advanced Studies in the Social Sciences in Paris.

In addition to his academic work, Gumbrecht regularly contributes commentaries on contemporary culture to journals and newspapers in English, German, Portuguese, and Spanish, notably the Frankfurter Allgemeine Zeitung, Neue Zürcher Zeitung, and Estado de São Paulo.

At Stanford, Gumbrecht convenes the Philosophical Reading Group along with Italian Literature professor Robert Harrison. The professors initiated the group in 1989 to provide students and faculty with an opportunity to engage in philosophical close reading and analytical discussion on a weekly basis. Over an academic quarter, the Group discusses one contemporary or historical text from the Western philosophical tradition.

== Honors ==
- June 2000: Cuthbertson Award for Distinguished Contributions to Stanford University
- May 2003: honorary doctorate from the Université de Montréal, Canada
- May 2007: honorary doctorate from the University of Siegen, Germany
- December 2007: honorary doctorate from the Saint Petersburg State University, Russia
- May 2008: honorary doctorate from the University of Greifswald, Germany
- January 2009: honorary doctorate from the Phillips-Universität Marburg, Germany
- January 2009: honorary doctorate from the University of Lisbon, Portugal
- September 2010: honorary doctorate from Aarhus University, Denmark
- April 2012: Winner of the José Vasconcelos World Award of Education granted by the World Cultural Council at Aarhus University, Denmark
- May 2012: honorary doctorate from Eötvös Loránd University, Hungary
- December 2015: Kulturpreis der Stadt Würzburg
- April 2016: honorary doctorate from Ilia State University, Tbilisi, Georgia
- July 2017: honorary doctorate from Leuphana Universität Lüneburg, Germany
- December 2019: honorary doctorate from Johannes Gutenberg-Universität at Mainz, Germany

== Selected works by Gumbrecht ==
- Eine Geschichte der spanischen Literatur. Suhrkamp, 1990
- Making Sense in Life and Literature. Minnesota University Press, 1992
- In 1926: Living at the Edge of Time. Harvard University Press, 1998 (translated into German, Hungarian, Portuguese, Russian, Spanish)
- Vom Leben und Sterben der grossen Romanisten. Germany/Hanser, 2002
- The Powers of Philology: Dynamics of Textual Scholarship. University of Illinois Press, 2003 (translated into German, Spanish, Georgian, Korean)
- Production of Presence: What Meaning Cannot Convey. Stanford University Press, 2004 (translated into French, German, Hungarian, Portuguese, Russian, Spanish)
- In Praise of Athletic Beauty. Harvard University Press, 2006 (translated into Cantonese, Danish, Dutch, French, German, Italian, Korean, Portuguese, Russian, Spanish, and Ukrainian)
- "Heidegger's Two Totalitarianisms". Telos 135 (Summer 2006). New York: Telos Press.
- "From Oedipal Hermeneutics to Philosophy of Presence". Telos 138 (Spring 2007). New York: Telos Press
- Geist und Materie. Zur Aktualität von Erwin Schrödinger. With Michael R. Hendrickson, Robert Pogue Harrison, and Robert B. Laughlin. Suhrkamp Verlag, 2008 (translated into English, Spanish)
- California Graffiti. Bilder vom westlichen Ende der Welt. Hanser Verlag, 2010
- Unsere breite Gegenwart. Suhrkamp Verlag, 2010 (translated into English, Portuguese, Spanish)
- Stimmungen lesen. Hanser Verlag, 2011 (translated into English, Portuguese, Spanish)
- After 1945: Latency as Origin of the Present. Stanford University Press, 2013 (translated into German, Portuguese, Hungarian, Russian, Polish, Spanish)
- Brüchige Gegenwart. Reflexionen und Reaktionen. Reclam, 2019
- Der Weltgeist in Silicon Valley. Leben und Denken im Zukunftsmodus. Zürich, NZZ Libro, 2019 (Spanish translation, Portuguese translation forthcoming)
- Baltasar Gracián: Handorakel und Kunst der Weltklugheit. Übersetzt und Herausgegeben von Hans Ulrich Gumbrecht. Reclam Verlag, 2020
- Crowds. Das Stadium als Ritual von Intensität. Vittorio Klostermann, Frankfurt 2020 (translated into English, Portuguese)
- Prose of the World: Denis Diderot and the Periphery of Enlightenment. Stanford University Press, 2021 (German, Spanish, Portuguese, Russian, French translations forthcoming)
