= Albert Guerard =

Albert Guerard may refer to:

- Albert Léon Guérard (1880–1959), American scholar of comparative literature
- Albert J. Guerard (1914–2000), American critic, novelist and professor, son of the above
