= Op. 104 =

In music, Op. 104 stands for Opus number 104. Compositions that are assigned this number include:

- Beethoven – String Quintet, Op. 104
- Brahms – Fünf Gesänge, Op. 104
- Dvořák – Cello Concerto
- Schumann – 7 Lieder
- Sibelius – Symphony No. 6 in D minor (1923)
