= Klaus Hinrich Stahmer =

German composer and musicologist

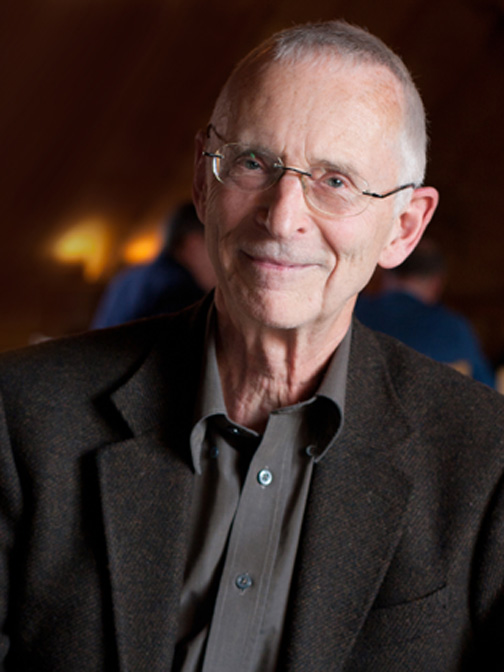
- Klaus Hinrich Stahmer
- Born: 25 June 1941 (age 85); Stettin
- Education: Dartington College of Arts; Musikhochschule Hamburg; University of Hamburg; in Kiel
- Occupations: Musicologist; Composer; Festival director
- Organizations: Hochschule für Musik Würzburg; Studio für Neue Musik; Tage der Neuen Musik; Deutscher Musikrat; Internationale Gesellschaft für Neue Musik

Klaus Hinrich Stahmer (born 25 June 1941) is a German composer and musicologist. He gave added to the development of music in the 1980s through multimedia works, including music with sound art sculptures and musical graphic). He also broke new artistic ground with his compositions for non-European instruments, which can be classified as world music.

== Life ==
Stahmer was born in Stettin. In 1945, the family fled to the West to escape the Russian military. During his school years in Lüneburg from 1947 to 1960, he received instrumental lessons in cello and piano and participated as a choral singer in oratorio and choral concerts. After completing school with the Abitur, he embarked on a wide range of music studies, at Dartington College of Arts in England, at the Institute of Music in Trossingen and the Musikhochschule Hamburg, where he took exams in music theory and cello teaching, and the first state exam in music pedagogy for Gymnasium. He studied further at the University of Hamburg and in Kiel where he was promoted to Dr. phil. in 1968. Of his academic teachers, the musicologist Constantin Floros, encouraged and stimulated him to combine musical practice with intellectual penetration and unrestricted openness to contemporary music.

From 1969 to 2004, Stahmer was a university lecturer at the Hochschule für Musik Würzburg, teaching musicology, especially music history, history of instrumentation, theory of forms and ethno-musicology, appointed professor in 1977. Important impulses came from his collaboration with the Studio für Neue Musik there, beginning in 1970, which he directed from 1989 to 2004. In 1976, he founded the festival Tage der Neuen Musik (Days of New Music) in Würzburg, which he directed until 2000.

Stahmer extended his commitment to contemporary music beyond the university of Würzburg to all of Germany. In collaboration with the Hindemith-Institute in Frankfurt, he curated and organised an exhibition entitled Musical Graphics. The graphic notation by John Cage, Earle Brown, Dieter Schnebel and other pioneers of were presented in the Museum im Kulturspeicher Würzburg and in Frankfurt, and were sonically realised in concerts. He also organised and realises an exhibition of around 40 sound sculptures, produced and developed by 22 artists from four European countries, which was shown as a travelling exhibition in Würzburg, Kulturforum in Bonn, (Heidelberger Kunstverein), Leopold Hoesch Museum in Düren and Spielboden, showing works by artists Bernard Baschet (Paris), Edmund Kieselbach, Gerlinde Beck, Stephan von Huene, Martin Riches, Peter Vogel created with composers such as Anestis Logothetis, Klaus Ager and Siegfried Fink, and with musicians such as Herbert Försch-Tenge, Peter Giger and Hans-Karsten Raecke. Compositions and improvisations were documented in an LP edition. Stahmer has published books, articles and essays on topics related to Neue Musik, and has worked as a journalist for radio stations and magazines. Since 2013, Stahmer has been a member of the Freie Akademie der Künste Hamburg.

In cultural politics, Stahmer was active in Deutscher Musikrat, and was president of the German section of the Internationale Gesellschaft für Neue Musik (IGNM) from 1983 to 1987 and from 2000 to 2002. He focused on improving the relations between Germany and Israel, as well as the rapprochement of Poland and Germany.

Since his retirement from university service, Stahmer has worked primarily as a composer, and has traveled to the Middle East and the Far East for lectures and study tours.

== Work ==
After Threnos for viola and piano (1963) and other youthful works, Stahmer found new forms of expression in collaboration with visual artists, partly using electronic means. Key works such as Transformationen (1972) and the percussion duo I can fly (1975) show Stahmer as an experimenter who, in addition to visual means of representation, also made use of contemporary poetry and created music with a high symbolic content in chamber music pieces such as Quasi un requiem (text: Henry Miller; 1974) and Tre paesaggi (text: Cesare Pavese; 1976). Since the mid-1970s, he also composed stage works such as the ballet Espace de la solitude and the ballet The Rhinos (after Eugène Ionesco), a joint production with jazz saxophonist Bernd Konrad. Larger chamber music cycles such as Acht Nachtstücke (1980), the one-act opera Singt, Vögel (1985/86; productions at the Theater Kiel, the Marstall München and the Gasteig in Munich) and the Three Bagatelles - in memoriam Igor Stravinsky (1992) also reveal a sense for larger dimensions.

In addition, Stahmer explored the sonic possibilities of Elmar Daucher's lithophone, and installations by Edmund Kieselbach. Whereas he had previously worked mostly improvisationally with sound sculptures, he now systematically developed sound structures in which "sound stones" were combined with conventional sound bodies, such as the string quartet in Crystal Grid (1992) and the accordion in To lose is to have (1999). Since 1994, the influence of non-European musical forms has increased, such as in the three Songlines (1994) and the one-hour piano cycle Sacred Site (1996), which was premiered in Australia. Pieces such as There is no return (1998) show that Stahmer's preoccupation with foreign ethnic groups not only has an intrinsic musical effect on his composing, but also includes political commitment to the victims of white tyranny. The tape piece (with vibraphone solo) Che questo è stato (1999), written over several years, expresses compassion for the victims of the Holocaust. The duo for the Chinese mouth organ Sheng and the Chinese Guzheng cither Silence is the only Music (2004) opens a series of pieces in which Stahmer draws on the playing style and tone of non-European instruments to represent his musical ideas. In the cycle Songs of a Wood Collector (2009), written in collaboration with the Lebanese poet Fuad Rifka, Stahmer uses the Arabic instruments qanun and frame drum.

Stahmer's compositions, including numerous vocal and instrumental solos, were often created in artistic collaboration with musicians such as singer Carla Henius, guitarists Siegfried Behrend, Reinbert Evers and Wolfgang Weigel, violinists Kolja Lessing, Herwig Zack and Florian Meierott, accordionist Stefan Hussong as well as specialists for non-European instruments such as the sheng player Wu Wei, Xu Fengxia and Makiko Goto (guzheng/koto), Gilbert Yammine (qanun), drummers Vivi Vassileva and Murat Coşkun.

== Style ==
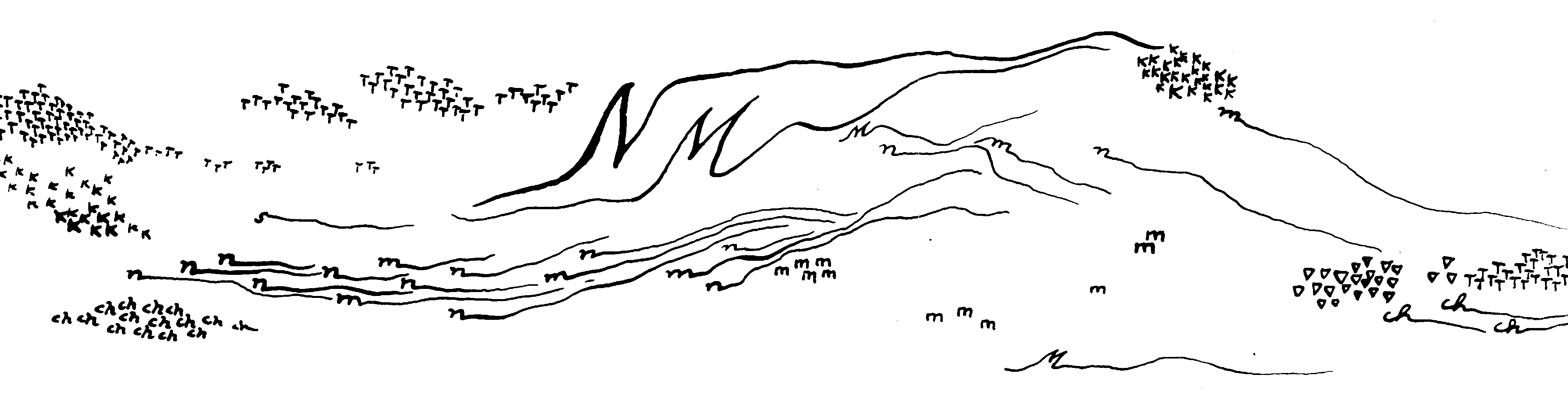
Stahmer: Die Landschaft in meiner Stimme (Excerpt)

"Klaus Hinrich Stahmer belongs to the generation of composers who were influenced in their youth by twelve-tone music, Theodor W. Adorno's musical aesthetics and the musical avant-garde of the sixties and seventies, but then sought and found their own way." Initially influenced by Hindemith, Bartók and Berg, Stahmer searched for new means of expression and developed his own diction by engaging with the visual language of contemporary painters and sculptors. In multimedia works, he "explored colour and spatial references of music and musical graphics." Since 1972, he tied instrumentally and electronically realised timbres into temporal processes in which diatonic or chromatic scales makes as little sense as the search for motivic/thematic criteria. Inevitably, this led to the dissolution of formal thinking, oriented on classical-romantic types, and to experimenting with open forms, which Stahmer presented in some of the forums of Neue Musik in Germany and abroad. "Not to be underestimated is the role of one's own participation in such performances: Often sitting and acting at the mixing desk or with his violoncello in the midst of the performers, he was able to directly feel and shape his acoustic material without having to take a diversion via a score, and not infrequently the boundaries between the composed and the improvised became blurred." While here the instrumental sound was noisily expanded and broken up, in vocal works such as Die Landschaft in meiner Stimme (1978) a turn towards the phonetic possibilities of the sounds produced with the mouth and vocal cords is also apparent (see illustration).

After a creative phase predominantly characterised by sound experiments, Stahmer sought ways to transfer these experiences to the more traditional playing and singing techniques, for example in unaccompanied solo compositions such as Aristofaniada (1979) and Now (1980). He developed a style that was increasingly based on retrospective, but which only conveyed the model in a broken form, and which was increasingly oriented towards ideals such as beauty of sound, and joy of playing. In a counter-movement, he wrote the musical graphic Birthday Canon for John Cage (1982) and the tape piece Der Stoff dem die Stille ist (1990), countering a lushness of sound decisively with a reduction of means and a withdrawal of expression. Finally, the sound gestures appear concise and clearly cut in the two piano pieces Music of Silence (1994/98) and the duo Nô Theatre, which is reminiscent of Japanese Nô Theatre. Ima (2007).

In the early 1970s, Stahmer had turned away from the melodic and harmonic models of the Schönberg school and given space to a renewed way of thinking about form and sound in his work. Later, he returned to a tonality which operates beyond all functional harmonical connections with the modal sound concepts of "Arabic maqam" (modes) or Far Eastern tunings, and sometimes involves pure (pythagorean) intonation. In addition, there is the special sound world of non-European instruments such as Qanun, Sheng, Koto, Shakuhachi among others, which, due to their special tunings and playing techniques, provide for unusual sound structures in the modern structure of movements. According to Stahmer, this reinforces a tendency that was already apparent in earlier works, in which the musical forms unfold more and more from the sonority as the structure of the movement expands and the time sequences are stretched. In this way, the pieces often come close to archaic musical forms, which Stahmer has experienced working with so-called "primitive cultures". The fact that his music nevertheless sounds rather "western" is due to a clear demarcation from any form of style copying. Stahmer sees his goal rather in an "enrichment of European music through the inclusion of Asian [and other] elements." By responding "seismographically to the development of a global culture" in his music and engaging in "a deeper understanding of non-European music" and "equal dialogue with musicians of Africa and Asia", he has succeeded in opening "new horizons for the art of composition". The closest way to describe this aesthetic position of the composer is the concept of "transculturality" introduced by Wolfgang Welsch.

== Themes and contents ==
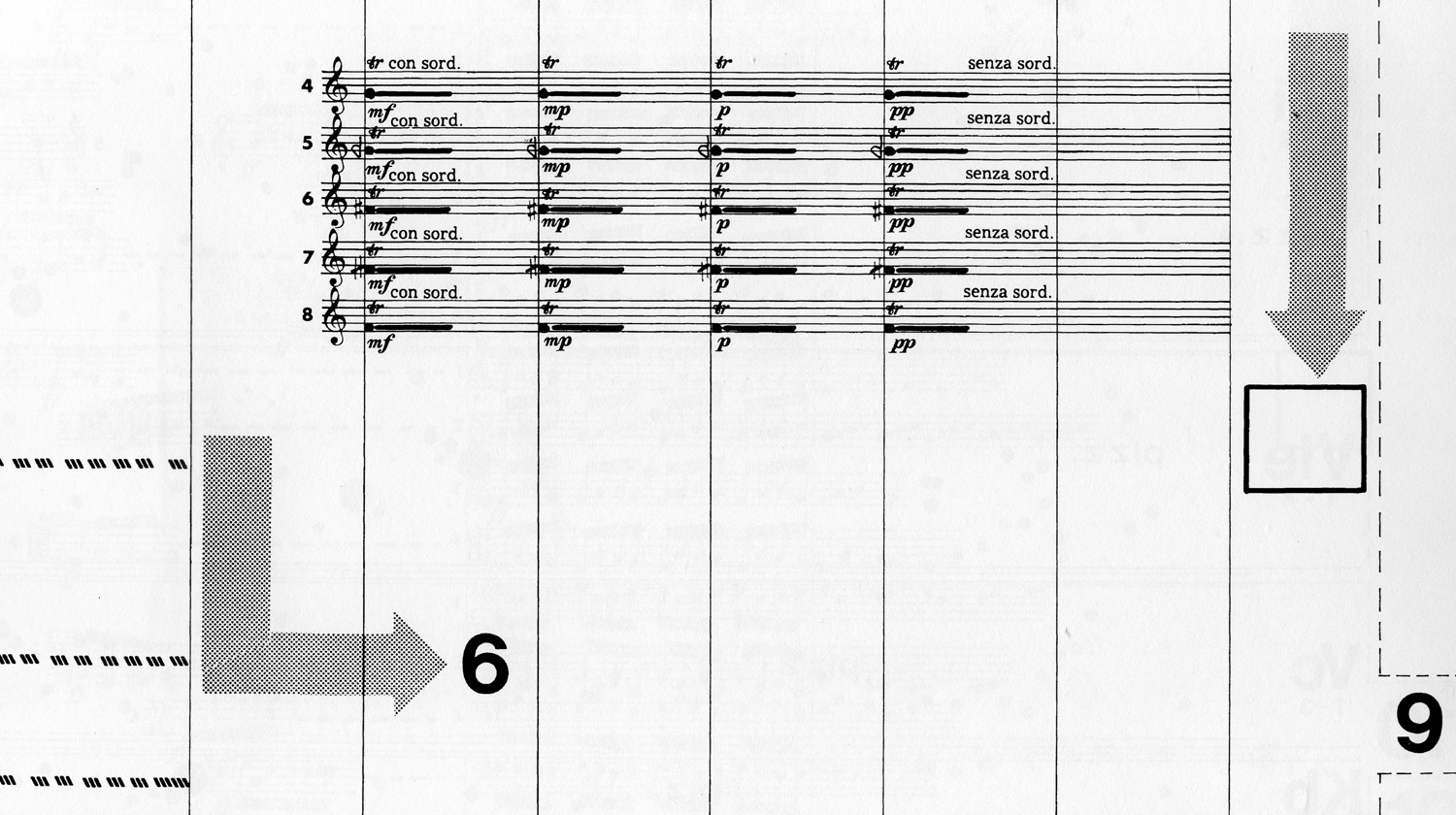
Section of the score Mobile Actions for strings, 1974

With a few exceptions, such as the Fantasie for violin or the Solo for double bass, Stahmer's compositions do not belong to the type of works in which playing takes place for the sake of playing. Rather, they are charged with extra-musical meaning and only become fully comprehensible through semantic decoding. In most cases, the themes and contents are revealed to the listener through the texts set to music, because "almost half of his works are closely related to language." Again and again, Stahmer has discovered "new possibilities" to "establish a relationship between the different artistic means of expression, music and the language of words. The spectrum ranges from text setting in the conventional sense to the musical interpretation and paraphrase of a linguistic model understood merely as "material"."

His chosen texts come from the Bible, Greek tragedy and contemporary poetry by authors such as Erich Arendt, Hans Magnus Enzensberger, Erich Fried, Hans Erich Nossack, and Nelly Sachs, and by lyricists such as Hans Georg Bulla, Jürgen Fuchs, Wolfgang Hilbig and Jürgen-Peter Stössel. He also set poems and prose by American authors such as Wystan Hugh Auden, Edward Estlin Cummings, Henry Miller and Dylan Thomas. The richness of imagery and the linguistic sound of Mediterranean poets such as Vicente Aleixandre, Cesare Pavese and Giuseppe Ungaretti inspired pieces full of sound and playfulness. In particular, texts by Eugène Ionesco and Samuel Beckett gave rise to pieces novel in tonal language and important in content. He set literature by a number of poets from African cultural including Jean-Felix Belinga Belinga, Sandile Dikeni and Dikobe wa Mogale. He was in close collaboration with the Lebanese Fuad Rifka. Stahmer also relied on anonymous text sources, such as grave inscriptions of a Jewish cemetery.

In many of his works, Stahmer conveys ideological ideas. Influenced by his own experiences of war and flight, he developed a pacifist basic attitude, which he gave expression to in works such as Quasi un requiem and Singt, Vögel. If in the aforementioned works from earlier times it was a rather general pacifist attitude, for which he sought out corresponding figures of speech in literature and set excerpts from The Colossus of Maroussi by Henry Miller or The Trojan Women by Euripides to music, later the statement sharpened into an indictment of the building of the Berlin Wall (in Wintermärchen), against the Nazi book burnings in Germany in 1933 (in Saved Leaves) and against South Africa's apartheid policy (in There is no Return). Here, too, Stahmer draws on texts by poets such as Heinrich Heine or Sandile Dikeni. He evokes memories of the Holocaust in pieces such as ... che questo è stato ... and Mazewot. The ballet music The Rhinoceroses after Rhinocéros by Eugène Ionesco, created in collaboration with Bernd Konrad, is an appeal against the spread of fascism.

Stahmer made spiritual statement initially in pieces connected to Christian church music, for example in Davids Lobgesang (David's song of praise, but later turned to Far Eastern ideas, such as WU and MING. Magical-mythical nature experiences of primitive peoples were expressed in the piano cycle Sacred Site and in Songlines. With their ritualistic form of performance and long duration, these works depart from conventional concert practice and unfold their effect preferably in connection with dance and image projections. In both Stahmer's politically committed pieces and compositions striving for spirituality, an attitude of openness to the world and to exchange emerges.

== Works ==
Works by Stahmer include: Orchestral and stage works

- Die Nashörner, ballet, with Bernd Konrad (1983)
- Singt, Vögel, one-act opera (1985/86)
- May they come, may they disembark, may they stay and rest awhile in peace for large orchestra (1997)

Piano music

- Sacred Site (1996)
- Musik der Stille (1994/98)
- Four Poems (2000/07)
- Ghinna’û Hattab (Gesänge eines Holzsammlers, Songs of wood gatherer, 2009)
- People out of Nowhere for two pianos (2000)

Chamber music

- Quasi un requiem for speaking voice and string quartet, text: Henry Miller (1974)
- I can fly for two percussionists (1975/81)
- 8 Nachtstücke for flute, guitar and violoncello (1983/90)
- Nocturne for Enzensberger for guitar solo (1984)
- Musik für die weißen Nächte for guitar and string quartet (1992)
- Em-bith-kâ [The Eagle Calls] for string quartet (1998)
- Mazewot [Tombstones] for solo violin (1998)
- There is no Return for flute, two percussionists and piano (1998/2005)
- Our Music is so sweet for violin solo (2002)
- Redland cello solo (2005)
- Flüchtige Augenblicke for accordion solo (2008/09)
- Solo for double bass solo (2014)
- Weiss for clarinet solo (2014)

Vocal music

- Tre paesaggi for speaking voice, guitar, percussion and tape, text: Cesare Pavese (1976)
- Die Landschaft in meiner Stimme / Musikalische Grafik (1978)
- Now, four Lieder for solo voice, text: E. E. Cummings (1980)
- Wintermärchen for three speakers, clarinet and string quartet, text: Heinrich Heine among others (1981)
- Momentaufnahmen for speaking voice and instrumental ensemble (1986/89)

Music with Sound Sculptures

- Erinnerungen aus den Wassern der Tiefe for guitar and tape recordings, live electronics ad libitum (1978)
- Kristallgitter for string quartet, computer-controlled stone sounds and ring modulation, based on "Sound Stone" by Elmar Daucher (1992)
- Herr der Winde for flute and playback CD, sound panels by Edmund Kieselbach (1997)

Music for non-European instruments

- Ning Shi' (Frozen Time) for sheng and accordion or piano (1994/2007)
- Silence is the only Music for sheng and guzheng (2004)
- Pulip Sori (Grass Song) for gayageum, cello and janggu (2006)
- Marthia (funeral song) for cello and qanun (2009)
- Zikkrayat (Memories) for qanun (2009)
- Feng Yu (Herr der Winde) for dizi and playback CD (2007)
- WU for sheng, clarinet and violoncello (2010)
- Baram Sori for daegeum and CD (2010)
- Taqasim for qanun, violin and cello (2011)
- Aschenglut for oriental frame drum and piano (2014)
- MING for sheng, accordion and cello (2015)

== Recordings ==
- Sacred Site, Philipp Vandré (piano), Kreuzberg Records CD kr 10021 (1998)
- silence is the only music, chamber music, six pieces for Far-Eastern and European musical instruments, Wu Wei, Xu Fengxia, Makiko Goto, Andreas Gutzwiller, WERGO CD ARTS 8116 2 (2009)
- Gesänge eines Holzsammlers (Songs of a Woodcutter), Fuad Rifka and Horst Mendroch (recitation), Pi-Sien Chen (piano), Murat Çoskun (frame drum), Gilbert Yammine (qanun); WERGO CD ARTS 81092 (2010)
- Licht, chamber music including Ming and Aschenglut, Wu Wei, Wen-Sinn Yang, Vivi Vassileva, Stefan Hussong, Pi-Hsien Chen, Maruan Sakas, Kreuzberg Records CD kr 10112 (2016)

== Publications ==
- Anmerkungen zur Streichquartettkomposition nach 1945; in Hamburger Jahrbuch f. Musikwissenschaft vol. 4, Hamburg (Wagner) 1980, pp. 7–32
- Mahlers Frühwerk – Eine Stiluntersuchung, in Form und Idee in Gustav Mahlers Instrumentalmusik, ed.: Stahmer, Wilhelmshaven (Heinrichshofen) 1980, pp. 9–28
- Musik in der Residenz. Würzburger Hofmusik, Würzburg (Stürtz) 1983
- Der Klassik näher als dem Klassizismus – Die Streichquartettkompositionen von Strawinsky, in: Hindemith Annales, vol. 12, Mainz (Schott) 1983, pp. 104–115
- Mythos Klang – Progress oder Regression?, in: catalogue Klangskulpturen, ed.: Stahmer, Frankfurt Feste, Alte Oper, Frankfurt 1985
- Bearbeitung als Interpretation – Zur Schubertrezeption Gustav Mahlers, Hans Zenders und Friedhelm Döhls and Zwischen Nostalgie und Utopie – Musik über und zu Gustav Mahler von Peter Ruzicka, Helmut Lachenmann, Wilhelm Killmayer, Vittorio Fellegara, Detlev Glanert, Michael Denhoff, Walter Zimmermann, Babette Koblenz und Thomas Jahn, in Franz Schubert und Gustav Mahler in der Musik der Gegenwart, ed.: Stahmer, Mainz (Schott) 1997, pp. 25–62 and pp. 93–106
- Neue Klangwelt der Gitarre, in nova giulianiad, 11/88, pp. 126 ff
- Fünfzig Jahre neue Musik in Israel, in Jahrbuch der Bayerischen Akademie der Schönen Künste, vol. 12, Munich 1998, pp. 526–523
- Zwischen Hörspiel und musique concrète – Klaus Hashagens radiophonische Musik, in Komponisten in Bayern, vol. 42, Tutzing 2003 pp. 75–90
- Mit Papa Haydn am Kilimandscharo – Afrikanische Streichquartette, in Neue Zeitschrift für Musik, 2006, H. 5, pp. 18–23
- Wind kommt auf – Anmerkungen zu "Angin", in "Wenn A ist, ist A" – Der Komponist Dieter Mack, ed.: Torsten Möller, Saarbrücken (Pfau) 2008 pp. 101–110
- Das Fremde und das Eigene – Gedanken eines Weggefährten zur außereuropäisch inspirierten Musik von Peter Michael Hamel, in Komponisten in Bayern, vol. 61, Munich (Allitera) 2017 pp. 62–87

== Awards and prizes ==
- 1981 1st prize in the competition "Junge Komponisten gesucht" of Koblenz
- 1984 1st prize in the competition of the Onyûkai Association Toky
- 1986 Johann-Wenzel-Stamitz-Preis of the Künstlergilde Esslingen
- 1994 Würzburg Cultural Prize;
- 1996 Cross of Merit on Ribbon of the Order of Merit of the Federal Republic of Germany
- 2001 Händel-Förderpreis der Stadt Halle (shared Handel composition prize)
- 2006 Honorary prize in the Tsang Houei Hsu Competition Taipei
- 2017 1st Prize Carl von Ossietzky Competition Oldenburg
- 2019 Wilhelm Hausenstein Honour of the Bavarian Academy of Fine Arts
