= Sidney Corbett =

American composer based in Germany

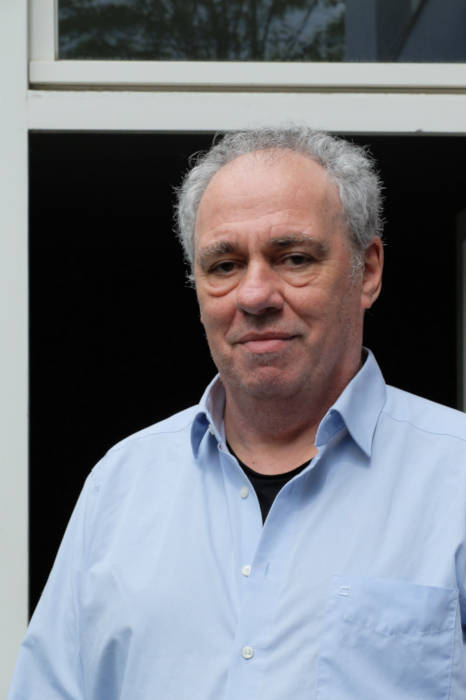
Sidney Corbett 2022 (c) Inge Zimmermann

Sidney Corbett (born April 26, 1960, in Chicago, Illinois) is an American composer based in Germany.

== Biography ==
Sidney Corbett was born in Chicago in 1960, the son of a Jewish mother and a Catholic father, but grew up without a religious upbringing. In 1968, he moved with his family to California, where he played as an electric guitarist in various bands in Los Angeles at the age of fifteen and composed his first works from 1977.

From 1978 to 1982, he studied philosophy and composition at the University of California, San Diego, with Bernard Rands and Pauline Oliveros, among others. In 1985, Corbett continued his composition studies at Yale University, where he taught as a "Teaching Fellow in Composition" and received his doctorate in 1989 with an analysis of the work Hyperprism by the French composer Edgar Varèse. His teachers at Yale University were Jacob Druckman, whose assistant he was, as well as Martin Bresnick, Frederic Rzewski and Morton Subotnick. Corbett was awarded the BMI Student Composer Award in 1985.

From 1985 to 1988, he studied composition with György Ligeti at the Musikhochschule Hamburg and took part in Vladimír Karbusický's doctoral seminar at the University of Hamburg's Institute of Musicology.

Corbett has lived mainly in Europe since 1985, in Hamburg, Stuttgart and Berlin. Since 1991 he has regularly given guest lectures and master classes in Europe and North America. From 1994–1995 he was a visiting professor for composition and analysis of contemporary music at Duke University in Durham (North Carolina).

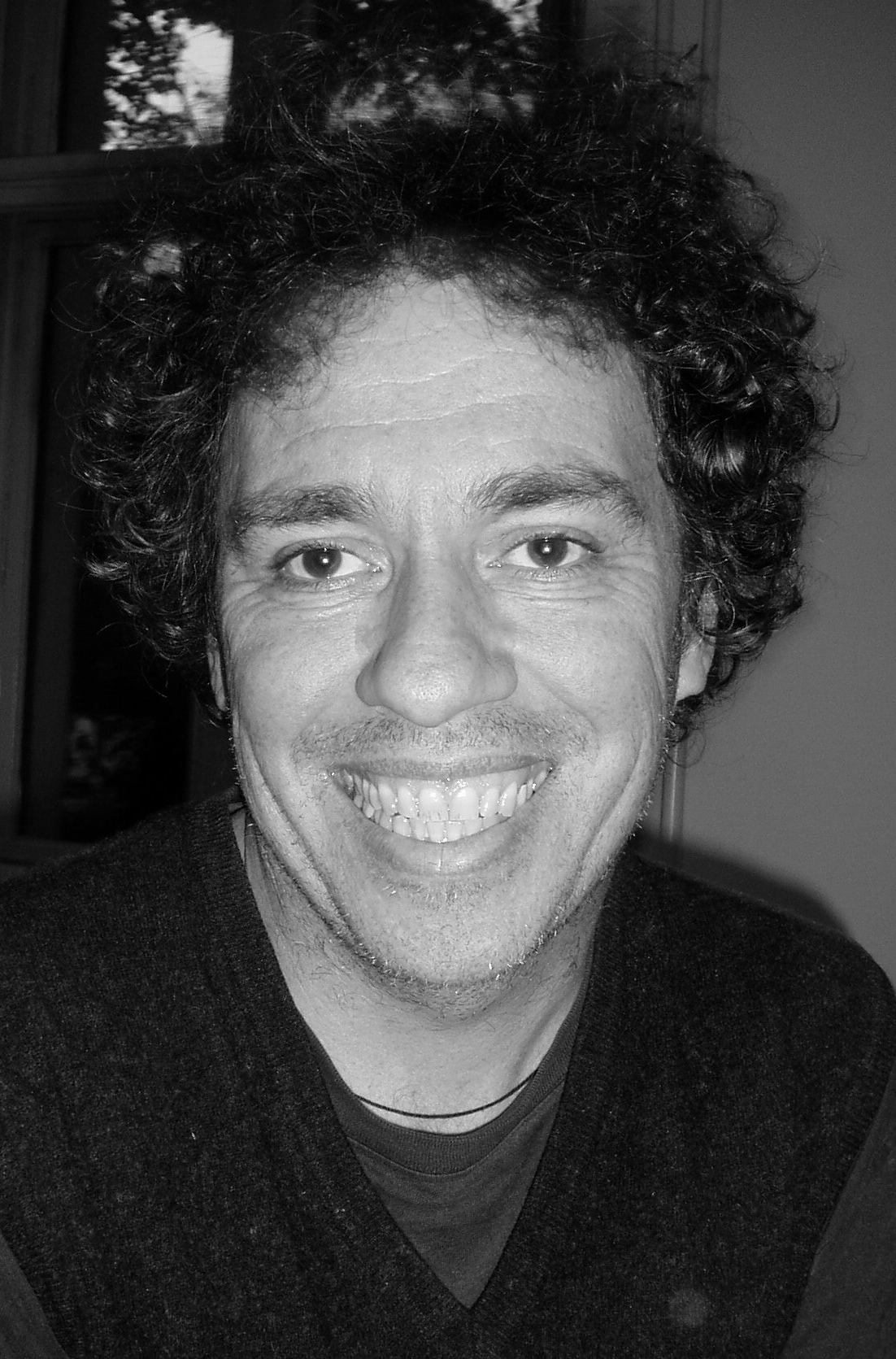
Sidney Corbett

In 2006, Corbett was appointed Professor of Composition at the Mannheim University of Music and Performing Arts. There he also directs the Forum Neue Musik, which he founded, as well as the concert series of the Gesellschaft für Neue Musik Mannheim (Society for New Music Mannheim). Corbett has lived with his family in Schwetzingen since 2014.

As a guitarist Corbett played from 2004–2008 in the avant-garde techno/house band "Vierte Heimat" and continues to play in various improvising formations to this day.

Corbett has authored articles on musical topics for many years and has also been involved in the programming of various concert series, including the College Music Society Europe (CMSE), Cologne and Musica Nova, Stuttgart.

Corbett was elected to the Akademie der Künste, Berlin in 2022.

Corbett's compositions are published and distributed worldwide by Edition Peters, Leipzig – London – New York.

Releases of his works have appeared on Sony Classical, Cybele, Mode Records, CRI, Edition Zeitklang, Kreuzberg Records, Blue Griffen, Edition Kopernikus and Ambitus Records.

== Compositional Output ==
=== Inspiration, sources ===
For Corbett, composing is a spiritual act, he concerns himself intensely with spiritual and theological questions and with all forms of mystical experience, including for example also Islamic mysticism. For him, this occupation with the spiritual is a principal source of inspiration; the spiritual is inseparable from the musical.

Corbett often uses holy scriptures as inspiration: he has for example used texts from the Old Testament, for example, Psalm 39 several times, e.g. Psalm 39 for mixed choir (2010), Canticum David for seven voices (2015) and Ein Fremdling, wie alle meine Väter ... for contrabbass clarinet (2010); instrumental variations on prophetic literature such as Three Lamentations [Of the Prophet Micah] for alto saxophone and organ (1998). There are also biblical figures in the operas Noach (2001) and Die Andere (2016).

Corbett uses texts from the Koran, for example in Die Sieben Tore (The Seven Gates) for mezzo-soprano, speaker, flute, harp, piano and percussion (2004) or refers to the Talmud, for example in Bleeding in Babylon for bass clarinet, guitar and double bass (2004).

Corbett has also been inspired by mystical works, including texts by Meister Eckhart for Des Engels Licht for soprano, accordion, harp and string trio (2005) and Vom inneren und äußeren Menschen. Ein Narrenspiel in 13 Inseln for soprano, baritone, speaker/actor and bible shelf (2010) and Mechthild von Magdeburg on Unsér Súnde for five voices (2007).

Corbett's interest in architecture is reflected, for example, in the title of his Symphony No. 1 "Tympan" for large orchestra (1991–1992), where the tympanum, an arched decorative surface above the lintel of the portal of a cathedral, is referred to in the title. The architectural floor plans and proportions of the 11th century cathedral in Mönchengladbach form reference points for the project Die Stimmen der Wände (The Voices of the Walls) for alto flute, saxophone, trombone, electric guitar, violin and violoncello (1993), created with the artist Brigitte Zarm.

Literary influences can be found in his compositions for music theatre, which form a focal point of his work, but also in numerous other works. Examples include numerous vocal works such as Portals for tenor and guitar (1998) based on poems by Walt Whitman, Lieder aus der Bettlerschale for soprano and piano (1998) based on poems by Christine Lavant, Nova angeletta for alto and violin (1996) and for soprano and viola (2000) based on a poem by Francesco Petrarca, Kykloi for soprano and chamber ensemble (2009) based on a text fragment by Barbara Köhler and Rasch for soprano, clarinet, viola, violoncello and piano based on texts by Roland Barthes (2010).

Corbett's instrumental music also bears witness to the composer's literary affinity, e.g. in his Third Symphony: ″Breathing the Water″ (2006), in which texts by Denise Levertov are juxtaposed with the poetry of Amal al-Jubouri. Yaël (2004) reflects Corbett's intensive, decades-long study of the work of Franco-Egyptian poet and philosopher Edmond Jabès. Works influenced by philosophical texts also include Aporia for chamber ensemble (2019), inspired by texts by Jacques Derrida and Utopia and Intimacy (Utopie und Nähe) for solo violin and six voices (2020) based on texts by Ernst Bloch.

=== Style ===
Corbett is an artist who cannot be easily placed within the new music mainstream. He is an active guitarist with considerable experience as an improvising musician in various contexts, for example with the avant-garde techno house band "Vierte Heimat", with the ensemble "Letzte Dernière" with two double basses, cello and electric guitar, in which, for example, works by Giacinto Scelsi or Rebecca Saunders were used as the basis for improvisation, and with the Lebanese musician Mazen Kerbaj.

His musical training did not begin with classical music; he only learned to write music at the age of 17 – before that, as a guitarist, he had done everything by ear, i.e. by memorizing or improvising. He has thus remained very open minded towards different forms and styles of musical expression.

During his study of composition in San Diego, at UCSD, from 1978, Corbett was confronted with the most extreme forms of avant-garde music; in 1982 he began his studies at Yale University and became interested for the first time in so-called traditional music - both of which influenced the musical language of his compositions at this time.

His study in Hamburg with György Ligeti from 1985-1988 was a particularly strong influence. At the time, Ligeti criticized Corbett's style as being too avant-garde. Corbett was encouraged to look at his own compositions more critically and, above all, more closely.

Corbett developed his own independent musical language, one primarily characterized by strictly linear and vocally oriented melodic writing. The melodic lines are often shifted against each other at half or whole tone intervals, leading to a dissonance-rich and tonally ambiguous harmony. His music is characterized by complex, superimposed rhythmic pulsations; metrical focal points are negated, giving Corbett's music a flowing character that oscillates in large phrases while still retaining formal unity. By incorporating extended playing techniques and the often unconventional combination of instruments, a rich spectrum of timbral colors is achieved.

=== Works ===
==== Stage (selection) ====
A particular focus of Corbett's work lies in the field of music theater.

- NOACH (2001), based on a libretto by Christoph Hein, was premiered at Theater Bremen in 2001. A young woman meets a very old man in a condemned house; he claims to be the biblical Noach.
- Keine Stille außer der Windes (2007): The chamber opera, based on texts by Fernando Pessoa, was premiered at Theater Bremen in 2007. The librettist Simone Homem de Mello created a constellation of six characters that can be understood as the voices of ONE consciousness. Further performances followed in 2022 at the Nationaltheater Mannheim.
- Ubu (2012): A Grotesque, the play Ubu Roi by Alfred Jarry forms the basis for the libretto by Simone Homem de Mello. The music, with a central role for the children's choir, contains quotes from Jimi Hendrix as well as from the metal and hard rock scene. The world premiere took place in 2012 at the Musiktheater im Revier, in Gelsenkirchen.
- Das Große Heft (The Notebook) (2013): After its world premiere at Theater Osnabrück in 2013, the large-scale work was also performed at the Staatstheater Braunschweig in 2022. It is based on Ágota Kristóf's novel Das große Heft about the fate of a pair of twins during the horrors of war. The boys find themselves in a world of brutalization and injustice, and become both perpetrators and victims. After the premiere in Osnabrück, the audience was so shaken that there were minutes of silence before the applause.
- Die Andere (2016): The chamber opera, based on a libretto by Christoph Hein, is based on the story of Abraham and his wife Sarah from the Old Testament and was premiered at Theater Magdeburg in 2016. Abraham impregnates Hagar, his wife's Egyptian maid, in order to father the governor prophesied by God, but 90-year-old Sarah also becomes pregnant. Hagar's son Ishmael and Sarah's son Isaac become the progenitors of two nations.
- San Paolo (2018), based on an unrealized screenplay by Pier Paolo Pasolini. In essence, San Paolo is a double portrait of the apostle Paul, transposed the 20th century and also of Pasolini himself, whose life in many way parallels that the apostle. The work premiered in Osnabrück in April 2018 and received the 2018 Palatinate Prize for Music.
- Jago (Iago) (2022) deals with the psychological deformation of Iago from Shakespeare's Othello; the work is a study of the evil so deeply rooted in the human pysche. The concert premiere took place in Falkenhagen (Brandenburg) in 2022.

==== Orchestral works (selection) ====
- Ghost Reveille (1984) for large orchestra. WP Zagreb 1989
- Posaunenkonzert (Concerto for Trombone and Orchestra) (1992). WP Helsinki 1994
- Yaël (2004) for violin and orchestra. WP Stuttgart 2005, performed by Kolja Lessing and Concertino Basel
- Exits (2005) for e-guitar and chamber orchestra. Commissioned by Deutschlandfunk, WP Köln 2005
- Among the Lemmings (2009) for large orchestra. Commissioned by Staatstheaters Cottbus. WP Cottbus 2010
- Paganini Remix (2016) for solo violin and orchestra
- Goldberg Hallucination Remix (2019) or solo violin and orchestra.WP Saderatzen (D) 2021
- Violence and Longing (2020). Commissioned by Musikalische Akademie, WP Nationaltheater Mannheim 2020
- Toward Absence (2023). WP Mannheim 2023

==== Symphonies ====
- Symphony No. 1: "Tympan" (1992). Commissioned by RSO Stuttgart, WP Stuttgart 1993
- Symphony No. 2: "The Immaculate Sands" (2004). Commissioned by Niederrheinische Sinfoniker, WP Krefeld (D) 2004
- Symphony No. 3: "Breathing the Water" (2006) after texts by Denise Levertov und Amal Al-Jubouri. Commissioned by Staatsoper unter den Linden, WP Berlin 2006

==== Vocal music (selection) ====
- Caverna (1994) for six female voices with percussion instruments, after a text fragment by Leonardo da Vinci. Commissioned by WDR and Eiszeit Festival Münster, WP Münster 1994
- Maria Magdalena (2005–2007), oratorio for 3 female solo voices, choir and orchestra. WP Stuttgart 2007
- Lucerna (2007) for six voices. WP Berlin 2008
- Unsér Súnde (2007) for five voices /+ string quartet, after a text by Mechthild von Magdeburg. WP Magdeburg 2007
- Psalm 39 (2010) for chorus a cappella /+ 1 instrument
- Utopie und Nähe (Utopia and Intimacy) (2020) for six voices and solo violin. WP Biennale für Neue Musik der Metropolregion Rhein-Neckar 2021, performed by SCHOLA HEIDELBERG, ensemble aisthesis and Nurit Stark, violin

==== Chamber music (selection) ====
- Die Stimmen der Wände (The Voices of the Walls) (1993), with visual artist Brigitte Maria Zarm. WP Mönchengladbach 1993
- Kammersinfonie (Chamber Symphony) (1995/1996). Commissioned by Initiativkreis Klassisches Akkordeon Berlin, WP Leipzig 1998
- Gesänge der Unruhe (Songs of Disquiet) (2003). WP Berlin 2003, performed by Modern Art Sextett
- Fractured Eden (2005) for string quartet. Commissioned by Tonhalle Düsseldorf, WP 2006
- Lines for Malte Spohr (2006) for chamber orchestra. Commissioned by Klangwerkstatt Berlin, WP 2006
- Variationen über einen Gedanken von György Kurtág (Variations on a Thought by György Kurtág) (2008) for six clarinets. Commissioned by Staatsoper Berlin, WP Basel 2010
- Music for Vija Celmins (2008) for string quartet and piano. WP Utrecht, by Severin von Eckhardstein and Utrecht String Quartet
- Only what disappears (2014) for bass clarinet, bassoon, piano, violin, viola and violoncello. WP Rottweil 2014, performed by Ensemble Aventure Freiburg
- Ararat (2019) for soprano saxophone, e-guitar, accordion, percussion, violin and violoncello. WP Kunsthalle Erfurt 2019
- La voce abbandonata (in memoriam Georg Katzer) (2019) for string quartet. WP Berlin 2020, performed by participants of The Felix Mendelssohn Bartholdy Conservatory Competition
- In the red chamber (2022) for ensemble. WP Schwere Reiter München 2023, performed by ensemble risonanze erranti
- Suspended Disbelief (2023) for string quartet. WP Aldeburgh Festival 2023, performed by Ligeti Quartet

==== Film music (selection) ====
- BRACHLAND | WASTELAND | NO MAN'S LAND. Video by Anna Katharina Scheidegger, 2002. Music: Corbett's Klavierkonzert
- FRAGMENTS OF DESTRUCTION. Film by Anna Katharina Scheidegger, 2004. Music: original musique concréte score by Sidney Corbett
- Half the Heart – Hälfte des Herzens. Music film by Andreas Rochholl, 2013. Music: from Corbett’s song cycle Lieder aus der Bettlerschale (1998) for soprano and piano, after a poem by Christine Lavant (1915–1973)

=== Festivals and performances (selection) ===
Gaudeamus Amsterdam (1988), Biennale Zagreb (1989), New Orchestra Project – New York (1989), Steirischer Herbst (1989), Eclat Stuttgart (2002), Performing Arts Chicago (1995), Duke Summer Arts Festival (1996), Tacheles Berlin 2004, Tonhalle Düsseldorf 2006, Klangwerkstatt Berlin (2006, 2018, 2021), Klangwerktage Hamburg (2007, 2012), Wien Modern (2009), Bregenzer Festspiele (2020, 2021), SinusTon-Festival für elektroakustische Musik (2014), Nordic Piccolo Festival (2023), Baltic Music Days Riga (2023) et al.

== Writings ==
- Sidney Corbett: Auf der Suche: Zum Tode des amerikanischen Komponisten Jacob Druckman, Neue Zeitschrift für Musik Nr.4, Juli/August 1996, Schott Verlag, Mainz (in German)
- Sidney Corbett: Die amerikanische Neue-Musik-Szene: Der subjektive Überblick eines Komponisten, Musik und Ästhetik, Klett-Cotta Verlag, Stuttgart (Heft 6/98) (in German)
- Sidney Corbett: Verzicht ist eine Antwort, zu den Begriffen Fortschritt, Avanciertheit und Avantgarde Musik und Ästhetik, Heft 33, Januar 2005, Klett-Cotta Verlag, Stuttgart (in German)
- Corbett, Sidney; Busch, Barbara (2011). "Sidney Corbett im Gespräch mit Barbara Busch". In Busch, Barbara (ed.). Sidney Corbett. Einblicke in sein kompositorisches Schaffen (PDF) (in German). Oldenburg: BIS-Verlag. pp. 21–40. ISBN 978-3-8142-2256-1.
- Corbett, Sidney (2011). "Ortung und Abschied". In Busch, Barbara (ed.). Sidney Corbett. Einblicke in sein kompositorisches Schaffen (PDF) (in German). Oldenburg: BIS-Verlag. pp. 41–48. ISBN 978-3-8142-2256-1.
- Corbett, Sidney (2011). "Schreitet die Musik fort? Gedanken zur Lage der heutigen Musik". In Busch, Barbara (ed.). Sidney Corbett. Einblicke in sein kompositorisches Schaffen (PDF) (in German). Oldenburg: BIS-Verlag. pp. 49–54. ISBN 978-3-8142-2256-1.
- Corbett, Sidney (2011). "Die amerikanische Neue-Musik-Szene. Subjektiver Überblick eines Komponisten". In Busch, Barbara (ed.). Sidney Corbett. Einblicke in sein kompositorisches Schaffen (PDF) (in German). Oldenburg: BIS-Verlag. pp. 55–68. ISBN 978-3-8142-2256-1.
- Corbett, Sidney (2011). "Das Dunkel ergründen. Strategien beim Umgang mit Text als musikalische Morphologie". In Busch, Barbara (ed.). Sidney Corbett. Einblicke in sein kompositorisches Schaffen (PDF) (in German). Oldenburg: BIS-Verlag. pp. 69–100. ISBN 978-3-8142-2256-1.
- Corbett, Sidney (2017-11-03). "Der Komponist Manfred Stahnke. Nachgezeichnet von seinem Freund". In Helmer, Benjamin; Hajdu, Georg (eds.). Just in Tone and Time. Assoziationen an Manfred Stahnke – eine Festschrift (in German and English). Neumünster: Bockel. ISBN 978-3-95675-020-5.
- Corbett, Sidney (2023-05-01). "A Reminiscence: Hamburg, August 1999". In Stahnke, Manfred (ed.). György Ligeti im Spiegel seiner Hamburger Kompositionsklasse through a glass, and darkly, but face to face (in German and English). BoD – Books on Demand. ISBN 978-3-7494-0982-2.
- Corbett, Sidney; Busch, Barbara; Lessing, Kolja (July 2022). "Mit Sidney Corbett im Gespräch. Standpunkte eines Kompositionspädagogen". In Tadday, Ulrich (ed.). Sidney Corbett. MUSIK-KONZEPTE (in German). München. pp. 96–100. ISBN 978-3-96707-674-5. ISSN 0931-3311.
