= Heinz Winbeck =

German composer and academic teacher (1946–2019)

- Heinz Winbeck, in 1980
- Born: 11 February 1946; Ergolding, Bavaria, Allied-Occupied Germany
- Died: 26 March 2019 (aged 73); Regensburg, Bavaria, Germany
- Education: Richard Strauss Conservatory; Musikhochschule München
- Occupations: Composer; Conductor; Academic teacher
- Organizations: Stadttheater Ingolstadt; Hochschule für Musik Würzburg
- Awards: Berliner Kunstpreis; Gerda-und-Günter-Bialas-Award; OPUS Klassik

Heinz Winbeck (11 February 1946 – 26 March 2019) was a German composer, conductor and academic teacher. He is known for five large-scale symphonies, which he programmatically subtitled, such as "Tu Solus" and "De Profundis". As a composition teacher in Würzburg, he shaped a generation of students.

== Career ==
Winbeck was born on 11 February 1946 in a small village named Piflas, now part of Ergolding, close to Landshut in Lower Bavaria, into a family of farmers. He began his musical studies in 1964 at the Richard Strauss Conservatory in Munich: piano with Magda Rusy and conducting with Fritz Rieger. From 1967 he studied conducting at the Musikhochschule München with Jan Koetsier and composition with Harald Genzmer and Günter Bialas, graduating with the Staatsexamen state exam in 1973. After his studies, he was encouraged especially by Wilhelm Killmayer to find his personal style. Like Wolfgang Rihm and Manfred Trojahn, he turned to a Neue Einfachheit (New simplicity) and subjectivity.

From 1974 to 1978 he worked as a composer and conductor at the Stadttheater Ingolstadt, also for the festival Luisenburg-Festspiele. In 1980 he taught at the Musikhochschule München. In 1981 he studied for half a year at the Cité internationale des arts in Paris on a scholarship from the State of Bavaria. In 1987 he taught ear training and music theory at the Musikhochschule München. In 1988 he was appointed professor of composition at the Hochschule für Musik Würzburg. Among his students were Tobias PM Schneid, the composer and pianist Rudi Spring and Stefan Hippe. Winbeck was composer in residence at the Cabrillo Festival of Contemporary Music in California.

From 1991 Winbeck lived in Schambach near Riedenburg in Lower Bavaria, in a presbytery that he and his wife Gerlinde modernised. He died on 26 March 2019 in a clinic in Regensburg. The CD box "Heinz Winbeck – The Complete Symphonies" published by the TYXart records label in 2019 was awarded the OPUS Klassik in the category "world premiere recording" in 2020; it also been nominated in the categories "symphonic recording of the 20th / 21st century" and "editorial performance of the year".

=== Symphonies ===
Winbeck revived the genre of the symphony, motivated by the need for existential expression. He composed five large-scale symphonies between 1983 and 2011, comparable to the symphonies of Gustav Mahler. By giving them titles, he reflected topics such as history as a sequence of wars and cruelty, the guilt of the generation of his parents, endangered ecology, the loneliness of humanity in the cosmos, and facing near-death.

Winbeck's First Symphony was premiered in 1984 at the Donaueschinger Tage für Neue Musik and recorded by WERGO, combined with Winbeck's second string quartet, with Dennis Russell Davies conducting the Rundfunk-Sinfonieorchester Saarbrücken. Winbeck's Fifth Symphony "Jetzt und in der Stunde des Todes" (Now and in the hour of death) reflects sketches of Anton Bruckner's unfinished 9th Symphony. The work in three movements of about 55 minutes was played by the Bruckner Orchestra Linz, conducted by Dennis Russell Davies on 1 March 2010 at the Stift St. Florian. The same year Winbeck started a collaboration with the Landestheater Linz, which resulted in the ballet "Lebensstürme" (Storms of life).

The composer commented on his way of composing:

Ich kann nichts anderes sagen, als daß ich buchstäblich nur das zu Papier bringe, das, würde ich es nicht tun, mich zersprengte.
(All I can say is that I literally only put down on paper that which, were I not to do so, would cause me to explode.)

== Works ==
Winbeck's works are published by Bärenreiter.

Vocal

- Glühende Rätsel (Glowing enigmas) (1970), song cycle for baritone and piano, Text: Nelly Sachs

Symphonic works

- Symphonies
  - Symphony No. 1 Tu Solus (You alone), (1983/85)
  - Symphony No. 2 (1985/86)
  - Symphony No. 3 Grodek (1987/88), for orchestra, alto and speaker, text: Georg Trakl
  - Symphony No. 4 De Profundis (Out of the deep, Psalm 130)
  - Symphony No. 5 Jetzt und in der Stunde des Todes (Now and in the hour of death, from the Ave Maria)
- Sonoscillant (1971), music for cello and string orchestra
- Entgegengesang (1973), for orchestra
- Lenau-Fantasien (1979), for cello and orchestra
- Denk ich an Haydn (1982), three fragments for orchestra

Chamber music

- Pas de deux (1971) for flute and xylophone
- String Quartet No. 1 Tempi capricciosi, First String Quartet (1979)
- String Quartet No. 2 Tempi notturni, Second String Quartet (1979)
- Blick in den Strom (1982) for 2 violins, viola and 2 cellos
- String Quartet No. 3 Jagdquartett (Hunting quartet), (1984)

== Awards ==
- 1974: First prize in the First composition competition of the Sommerliche Musiktage Hitzacker (Summer Music Days)
- 1980: Second prize in the Fourth composition competition in Hitzacker
- 1981: Grant award of the city of Munich
- 1981/82: scholarship by State of Bavaria for studies of half a year at the Cité internationale des arts
- 1985: Music prize of the Berliner Kunstpreis
- 2004: Gerda-und-Günter-Bialas-Preis of the GEMA Foundation
- 2010 Friedrich-Baur-Preis
- 2020 OPUS Klassik

In 1994 Heinz and Gerhilde Winbeck won a prize for the historical renovation by the Hypo-Foundation.

== Discography ==
- Heinz Winbeck – The Complete Symphonies, 2019 TYXart, TXA17091, LC28001 OCLC 1124789860
- Heinz Winbeck – Erste Sinfonie Tu Solus, Zweites Streichquartett tempi notturni, 1990, WERGO 6509 2, LC 8046 OCLC 1283712920
- Heinz Winbeck – Denk ich an Haydn / Entgegengesang, LP, 1982, col legno – 5517, LC 7989 OCLC 756740957
- J. F. Kleinknecht, H. Winbeck, P. Engel / Münchener Kammerorchester – Fest-Konzert, "Lenau-Fantasien", 1980, Bayerische Vereinsbank, A-5580 A-1/80S OCLC 644088185
