= Robert Pogue Harrison =

- Born: İzmir, Turkey

Academic background
- Education: American Overseas School of Rome; Santa Clara University; Cornell University

Academic work
- Institutions: Stanford University

Robert Pogue Harrison is an American literary scholar, cultural critic, and public intellectual. He is Professor Emeritus of French and Italian and Rosina Pierotti Professor Emeritus of Italian Literature at Stanford University. Harrison is known for his studies on Dante, and medieval Italian poetry as well as for his broader philosophical and cultural reflections on nature, mortality, and the human condition. He is also the creator and host of the long-running literary podcast Entitled Opinions (About Life and Literature).

He has been a member of the American Academy of Arts and Sciences since 2007. In October 2014, he was decorated with the title of Chevalier of the Ordre des Arts et des Lettres by the French government.

== Biography ==
Harrison was born in İzmir, Turkey, where he lived until the age of twelve.

Following the death of his American father, Harrison moved with his family to Rome, the native city of his Italian mother. He attended the Overseas School of Rome, an international school where he studied under teachers from diverse backgrounds, including the Irish poet Desmond O’Grady. Harrison has often credited this period, particularly the influence of his English teachers in the early 1970s, with shaping his literary sensibilities.

He went on to pursue higher education in the United States, earning a bachelor’s degree in Humanities from Santa Clara University in 1976. After a period of exploration, he entered graduate school at Cornell University, where he completed a doctorate in Romance Studies in 1984 with a dissertation on Dante’s Vita Nuova.

In 1985, he accepted a visiting assistant professorship in the Department of French and Italian at Stanford. In 1986, he joined the faculty as an assistant professor. He was granted tenure in 1992, and was promoted to full professor in 1995. In 1997, Stanford offered him the Rosina Pierotti Chair. In 2002, he was named chair of the Department of French and Italian, which he continued to be until 2010. In September 2014, he once again became chair of the department. He retired in 2024 and is now professor emeritus.

== Scholarly works ==
He began his academic career as a Dante scholar, publishing The Body of Beatrice in 1988. His work quickly expanded to concern itself broadly with the Western literary and philosophical tradition, focusing on the human place in nature and what he calls "the humic foundations" of human culture.

In 1992, he published Forests: The Shadow of Civilization, a wide-ranging history of the religious, mythological, literary, and philosophical role of forests in the Western imagination.

In 2003, he published The Dominion of the Dead, in which he probes the relations the living have maintained with the dead in a number of secular domains, among them burial places, houses, testaments, images, dreams, and political institutions.

In his book Gardens: An Essay on the Human Condition (2008), Harrison focused on the role that care and cultivation play in human culture, arguing that gardens embody "the vocation of care" that defines the inner core of our humanity.

He also contributed several essays to the New York Review of Books, to which he has been a regular contributor since 2009. He has written essays on John Muir, Theodore Roosevelt, Ralph Waldo Emerson, Giacomo Leopardi, Dante Alighieri, Harold Bloom, the King James Bible, America's natural history, and Margaret Fuller. He also recently contributed a critique of Silicon Valley culture to the New York Review of Books online blog.

He has also contributed to the Financial Times, reviewing an English-language translation of Giacomo Leopardi's Zibaldone.

His most recent monograph, Juvenescence: A Cultural History of Our Age (2014), examines the modern obsession with youth and its broader cultural consequences. Together, these works demonstrate Harrison’s distinctive blending of literary analysis, philosophical reflection, and cultural criticism, and they have been widely translated and discussed across disciplines.

== Themes and influence ==
Robert Pogue Harrison’s scholarship bridges literature, philosophy, and cultural history, often exploring human relationships with nature, mortality, and memory. In Forests: The Shadow of Civilization and Gardens: An Essay on the Human Condition, he examines how natural and cultivated spaces shape cultural imagination.The Dominion of the Dead considers how societies engage with death through rituals, memory, and institutions, while Juvenescence critiques modern culture’s obsession with youth at the expense of wisdom.

A central motif in Harrison’s work is the concept of thresholds—liminal spaces between forest and civilization, the living and the dead, or terrestrial and extra-terrestrial realms—reflecting his interest in boundaries as sites of meaning and relation. He emphasizes the generative power of limits, drawing on thinkers such as Heidegger and Camus, and stresses the rediscovery of the Western canon as a dynamic, interpretive process.

Through his long-running podcast Entitled Opinions, Harrison has extended these concerns to public discourse, addressing poetry, philosophy, technology, artificial intelligence, and the ecological crisis, establishing himself as a prominent voice connecting academic scholarship with broader cultural debates.

== Views and opinions ==
Through his podcast and public lectures, including the 2024 Eugene Lunn Memorial Lecture at UC Davis and the 2023 Clark Lectures at Trinity College, Harrison engages with global audiences on topics ranging from poetry and philosophy to artificial intelligence, the ecological crisis, and mindfulness. He emphasizes the importance of imagination, metaphor, and literary rediscovery in the humanities, while critically assessing the effects of technology, social media, and AI on human creativity, relational experience, and education.

Harrison is also a musician and a public intellectual whose work bridges scholarship and accessible cultural discourse, drawing on his Mediterranean upbringing, philosophical influences such as Heidegger and Camus, and a lifelong engagement with literature, nature, and the ethical dimensions of contemporary life.

== Entitled Opinions ==
Entitled Opinions
- Genre: literary talk show
- Running time: 60 minutes
- Country of origin: United States
- Language: English
- Home station: KZSU
- Starring: Robert Harrison
- Produced by: Vittoria Mollo
- Recording studio: Stanford, California
- Original release: September 14, 2005 – June 21, 2019
- Website: entitledopinions.stanford.edu
- Podcast: iTunes

Entitled Opinions is a literary talk show hosted by Robert P. Harrison. The show was started in 2005 and it is available as a podcast. Topics range broadly on issues related to literature, ideas, and lived experience. Shows are typically a one-on-one conversation with a special guest about select topics or authors about which he or she is especially entitled to an opinion. Guests have included Werner Herzog, Marilynne Robinson, Richard Rorty, and Paul R. Ehrlich, among others. The program airs from the studios of KZSU, 90.1 FM, Stanford.

== Bibliography ==
=== Books ===
- The Body of Beatrice (Johns Hopkins University Press, 1988, ISBN 9780801866678)
- Forests: The Shadow of Civilization (University of Chicago Press, 1992, ISBN 9780226318073)
- Rome, la Pluie: A Quoi Bon Littérature? (Paris: Flammarion, 1994)
- The Dominion of the Dead (University of Chicago Press, 2003, ISBN 9780226317939)
- Gardens: An Essay on the Human Condition (University of Chicago Press, 2008, ISBN 9780226317908)
- What is Life? The Intellectual Pertinence of Erwin Schrodinger (Stanford University Press, 2011)

(with Michael R. Hendrickson, Robert B. Laughlin and Hans Ulrich Gumbrecht)

- Juvenescence: A Cultural History of Our Age (University of Chicago Press, 2014, ISBN 9780226381961)

== Awards, nominations and honours ==
- Ordre des Arts et des Lettres
  - Knight (2013)
