= Sandile Dikeni =

South African poet and editor (1966–2019)

- Born: 1966; Victoria West, Union of South Africa
- Died: 9 November 2019 (aged 53); Cape Town, South Africa
- Occupations: Poet, editor

Sandile Dikeni (1966 – 9 November 2019) was a South African poet and editor.

== Career ==
Dikeni was born in the small Karoo town of Victoria West. He studied law at the University of the Witwatersrand and the University of the Western Cape, where he was a member of the SRC, and later obtained a diploma in journalism from Peninsula Technikon. While detained by the apartheid government, he began writing poetry, and later performed at political rallies, and is quoted saying:

My point of fame wasn’t really how eloquently I could articulate an anti-apartheid stance in strict political terms. It was more [a] cultural articulation of my anti-apartheidism.

After the end of apartheid, he worked as a journalist and political commentator, started the AM Live and PM Live radio shows at SAFM in 1995, and worked as arts editor for the Cape Times, editor of Die Suid Afrikaan and political editor of This Day.

Dikeni is the author of three collections of poems, including Guava Juice, (Mayibuye Books, 1992), which is followed by Telegraph to the Sky (UKZN Press, 2001) and Planting Water (UKZN Press, 2007). He also published a collection of his articles from the Cape Times, Soul Fire: Writing the Transition (UKZN Press, 2002), and his essay 'How The West Was Lost' appeared in Chimurenga 07: Kaapstad! And Jozi the Night Moses Died (July 2005). On 10 February 2005, he recorded in collaboration with German composer Klaus Hinrich Stahmer a collection of his poetry published by Wergo, accompanied by musicians Carin Levine (flutes);Jennifer Hymer (piano); Stephan Froleyks and Olaf Pyras (percussion); Omphalo-Quartett (African drums); Andreas König and Aki Hoffmann (piano).

He was described by Cape Times editor Aneez Salie as "one of the finest poets and journalists our Struggle has produced".

He survived a car accident in 2005 and recovering slowly after a coma, he continued to participate in events, such as the launch of Planting Water in 2007. His death on 9 November 2019 from tuberculosis was mourned in numerous obituaries.

== Poetry ==
- Guava Juice (1992)
- Telegraph to the Sky (2002)

== Other works ==
- Soul Fire: Writing the Transition (2002).
