= Günter Jena =

German conductor (1933–2026)

- Born: 2 January 1933; Leipzig, Saxony, Germany
- Died: 7 May 2026 (aged 93)
- Education: Thomasschule; Musikhochschule Leipzig; University of Berlin; Musikhochschule München
- Occupations: Conductor; Musicologist; Kirchenmusikdirektor
- Organizations: St. Johannis, Würzburg; St. Michaelis, Hamburg
- Awards: Johannes Brahms Medal; Würzburg Cultural Prize
- Website: www.guenter-jena.de

Günter Jena (2 January 1933 – 7 May 2026) was a German choral conductor and musicologist. He was the director of church music at St. Michaelis in Hamburg from 1973 to 1997. He founded the festival Bach-Tage Hamburg, and provided music for ballet performances of choreographer John Neumeier at the Hamburg State Opera, including Bach's St Matthew Passion.

== Life and career ==
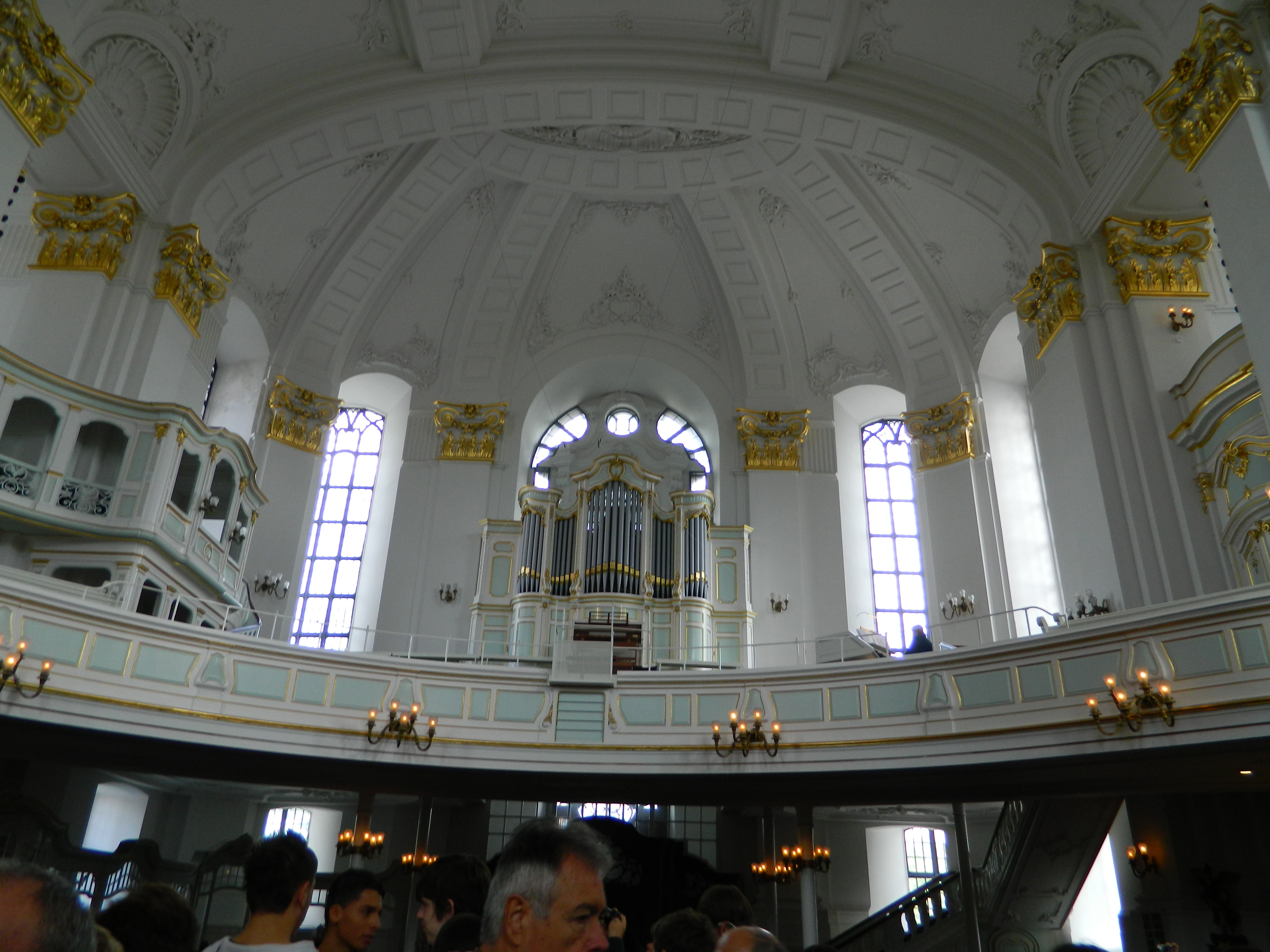
Organ in St. Michaelis, Hamburg, where Jena was responsible for church music from 1974

Born in Leipzig, Jena attended the Thomasschule there, and then studied musicology. He studied psychology and philosophy in Berlin, and conducting and organ at the Musikhochschule München with Karl Richter, becoming his assistant.

Jena worked as the church musician at St. Johannis in Würzburg. In 1969 he founded the festival Würzburger Bachtage. From 1973 he was the church musician at Hamburg's Hauptkirche St. Michaelis, where he regularly conducted performances with a focus on the music by Bach, but also works from the classical period and the romantic era. He founded the festival Bach-Tage Hamburg, and was appointed Kirchenmusikdirektor (director of church music) for the region. Jena prepared choir and orchestra for performances by the choreographer John Neumeier at the Hamburgische Staatsoper, including Bach's St Matthew Passion in 1981 and Mozart's Requiem. Jena conducted the performances for the premieres, and also a revival of the St Matthew Passion in 2013, now in his church. The 200th performance of the production was given on Good Friday 2017.

Jena prepared and conducted the NDR Chor for a recording of the complete a cappella works by Johannes Brahms from 1981, including Fünf Gesänge, Op. 104. He retired in 1997.

Jena published books about the musicological and theological background of Bach's Christmas Oratorio, The Art of Fugue and St Matthew Passion. He was a member of the Freie Akademie der Künste Hamburg.

Jena died on 7 May 2026, at the age of 93.

== Awards ==
Jena was awarded the Würzburg Cultural Prize in 1970. The Hamburg Senate appointed him an honorary professor in 1986 and awarded him the Johannes Brahms Medal in 1987. He was an honorary member of the Carl Philipp Emanuel Bach Gesellschaft in Hamburg which had been founded on his initiative in 1974.

== Publications ==
- "Das gehet meiner Seele nah". Die Matthäuspassion von Johann Sebastian Bach. Piper Verlag 1993, Herder Verlag, Freiburg 1999
- "Brich an, o schönes Morgenlicht". Das Weihnachtsoratorium von Johann Sebastian Bach. 1997
- Ich lebe mein Leben in wachsenden Ringen, 2000

== Recordings ==
- Johannes Brahms, Chorwerke. NDR Chor. OCLC 310609581
- Johann Sebastian Bach, Weihnachtsoratorium. Choir and orchestra of St. Michaelis, Lynne Dawson, Marjana Lipovšek, Peter Schreier, Andreas Schmidt. 1997 OCLC 1183517685
