= Stefan Hippe =

German composer, conductor and accordionist

Stefan Hippe (born 1966) is a German composer, conductor and accordionist.

== Life ==
Born in Nuremberg, Hippe received his first accordion lessons from Herbert Bausewein in 1974 and his first composition lessons from Hans-Ludwig Schilling in 1981. At the Hochschule für Musik Nürnberg he studied accordion with Willi Münch and Irene Kauper, then composition at the Hochschule für Musik Würzburg with Bertold Hummel and Heinz Winbeck and conducting with Günter Wich. Since 1999, he has taught at the Nuremberg Music School, and from 2004 to 2007 at the University of Erlangen–Nuremberg. Since 2015, he has been a lecturer among others for conducting at the Hohner-Konservatorium in Trossingen. As a composer and soloist, Hippe among others works with the Nürnberg Accordion Orchestra, the Ensemble Kontraste and the Staatstheater Nürnberg. With the soprano Irene Kurka he founded the duo Soprakkordeon in 2000. Furthermore, he is the principal conductor of the Bundesakkordeonorchester (BuAkkO), a project and selection orchestra founded in 2010 and sponsored by the Deutscher Harmonika-Verband.

== Awards ==
- 1994: 1st prize at the composition competition of the Summer Music Academy Hitzacker (for the 2nd string quartet)
- 1995: 1st prize at the composition competition of the city of Würzburg (for Kammermusik No.1)
- 1997: Scholarship stay in the Cité internationale des arts Paris
- 1998: Preis der Stadt Nürnberg
- 2000: Bavarian Promotion Prize for Young Artists
- 2003: Wolfram-von-Eschenbach-Preis; Fördergabe der Internationale Bodenseekonferenz (Zürich)
- 2006: Prize of the City of Cottbus (for Tumulus – nachts)

== Compositions ==
=== Stage music ===
- A Lady Dies (1999). Chamber opera. Libretto: Gerhard Falkner. 11 March 2000 Nürnberg (Tafelhalle)

=== Vocal compositions ===
- 23rd Psalm (1983) for voice and organ. Text Latin and German. 17 April 1988
- Die drei Teiche von Hellbrunn (1989). 1st string quartet, with soprano solo and double bass. Text: Georg Trakl. 19 June 1989, Lohr am Main
- Egonoia (1990) for chamber choir, contrabassoon and piano. Texts: 6 poems by Ernst Jandl. 20 June 1990, Würzburg
- Jusques à la mort... (1990). Song cycle for alto and piano. Text: Guillaume de Machaut, Rainer Maria Rilke and Friedrich Hölderlin. 17 December 1990, Würzburg
- Frühlingslied (1995) for mixed choir and accordion orchestra (4.4.4.2B). Text: from the Carmina Burana. 15 June 1996, Schweinfurt
- Wild with love (1997). Chamber music No.3 (1st movement) for voice, flute, percussion and accordion. Text: Stanley Kunitz. 21 November 2001, Nuremberg
- Credo (2000) for 8-part chamber choir and brass. 1 October 2000, Nuremberg
- Our Father (2001) for soprano, baritone, harp, glockenspiel and string sextet (1.1.2.2.0). 11 August 2001, Regensburg
- Wahnsinniges Gedicht (2001/02) for mixed choir and accordion orchestra. Text: 5 poems by Ernst Jandl. 6 May 2006, Nuremberg
- Under der linden (2002) for chamber choir. Text: 3 poems by Walther von der Vogelweide. 19 August 2002
- die liebe (2002) for soprano and accordion. Text: 2 poems by Gerhard Falkner. 14 January 2003, Nuremberg (Irene Kurka [soprano], Hippe [accordion])
- Blauer Himmel (2003) for soprano, flute, 2 guitars, violoncello and accordion. Text: 2 poems by Gerhard Falkner. 10 December 2003, Würzburg
- Requiem (2005) for soprano, mixed choir and orchestra. Text by Alejandra Pizarnik and from the Old Testament. 19 November 2005, Nuremberg (St. Lorenz)
- Stabat mater (2008) for 3-part mixed choir and accordion. 18 April 2009, Warsaw
- Atem 1946 (2019) for choir a cappella - Heinz Winbeck in Memoriam. 25 MaY 2019, Erlangen

=== Orchestra/ Ensemble work ===
- The Temptation of St. Anthony (1986/97) for accordion orchestra (4.4.4.2B.2 Elektronium). 22 May 1998, Innsbruck
- Fresques (1989) for orchestra (2.2.2.2 - 4.2.3.0 - harp - percussion [2] - strings). 5 April 1991, Bad Reichenhall
- ...ein leiser Ton gezogen... (1990/91) for accordion orchestra (5.5.4.2B.2 Elektronien.Sw). 8 November 1991, Gaggenau
- Krakatao (1993) for accordion orchestra (4.4.3.2B.1-2 Elektronien.Sw). 23 November 1994, Weißenburg
- Kammermusik No.1 (1994) for ensemble (10 players: 1.0.1.0 - 1.1.1.0 - percussion - piano - strings: 1.0.0.1.1). 23 March 1995, Würzburg
- MŒHB (1996). Seven pieces for accordion orchestra (4.4.4.2B.2 Elektronien). 21 November 1998, Horsholm
- Salut (1997) for accordion orchestra (4.4.3.3.2B.2 Elektronien) and percussion. 24 June 1997, Stuttgart
- Portraits (1997) for symphony orchestra and accordion orchestra (4.4.4.4). 13 February 1988, (Hofer Symphoniker)
- OURCQ. Rêvie parisienne (1997) for accordion and accordion orchestra (4.4.4.2B.2 Elektronien). 21 November 1998, Nuremberg
- Ausdrucksorte (1998) for accordion orchestra (4.4.4.2B). 5 December 1998, Laaber
- Short Cuts' (2002/03) for accordion orchestra (4.4.3.3.2B), 2 electrons (ad libitum) and percussion (ad libitum). 19 July 2003, Nuremberg
- The Moons of Saturn

- Part 1 (2005) for accordion orchestra (4.4.3.3.2 Elektronien.2B) and percussion. 8 April 2006, Trossingen

Part 2 (2006) for accordion orchestra (4.4.3.3.2 ;Elektronien.2B) and percussion. 18 March 2007, Erlangen

- Part 3 (movements 10-14; 2008/09) for accordion orchestra (4.4.3.3.2B). Autumn 2009 Cottbus

- Tumulus - at night (2006) for accordion and string orchestra (6.5.4.3.2). 16 September 2006, Nuremberg (production: Rundfunk Berlin-Brandenburg)
- Tango capriccioso (2006) for accordion orchestra (4.4.3.3.2 Elektronien.2B), piano and percussion. 28 April 2007, Fürth
- Disposition (2006) for organ, 2 oboes, 2 horns in F and string quintet (solo or choral). 3 December 2006, Nuremberg (St. Jobst; for the inauguration of the organ).
- Trois Pièces' (2007) for youth symphony orchestra. 12 December 2007, Limoges
- Piano Concerto (2007/08)

Version for piano, accordion orchestra (with 2 electrons) and timpani. 22 March 2009, Frankfurt Version for piano and symphony orchestra.

=== Film scores ===
- for In der Hoffnung ist gut leben (Documentary by Helge Cramer) (1995), for accordion. First broadcast 28 August 1995 (Mitteldeutscher Rundfunk)
- for Fantômas (1913, director: Louis Feuillade) (2003/04), for 5 accordions, 2 electroniums and basso. 31 January 2004, Erlangen (Silent Film Music Days)
- for The White Hell of Pitz Palu (1929, director: Arnold Fanck, Georg Wilhelm Pabst) (2004), für Kammerensemble. 31 January 2005 Erlangen (Stummfilmmusiktage)

=== Chamber music ===
==== Soli ====
- Capriccio (1981) for accordion. 1 April 1982 Nuremberg
- Epitaph fûr M (1987) for piano. 11 May 1988 Nuremberg
- Foot Fire Burn Dance (1997). Chamber music No.3 (2nd movement) for percussion. 11 February 2001, Lüneburg
- 1000 Pieces (2001ff.) for piano (first pieces). 5 May 2001 Munich

Work in progress; so far: No. 1, 22, 83, 325, 741, 772, 907

- Dies Irae (2003) for guitar. 10 October 2003 Wolframs-Eschenbach
- Marsch 1933-1945 (2006) for guitar. 19 May 2006 Shenzhen
- Zithat (2006) for treble zither. 20 October 2007 Hanau
- 1000 Töne (2007) for accordion. 23 November 2007 Fürth

==== Duos ====
- Kurioso (1983) for bassoon and accordion. 5 December 1986 Nuremberg
- Sphinx (1988) for percussion and accordion. 19 April 1988 Würzburg
- Trip (1992) for bass drum (2 players), after a text by Günter Eich. 22 June 1992 Würzburg
- Liaison (1992) for flute and accordion. 12 February 1993 in Lohr am Main (with the flutist Carina Vogel and Stefan Hippe)
- Dessins (1994) for piano 4 hands. 5 March 1994, Würzburg
- Nerv (1995) for clarinet in A (B) and accordion. 15 September 1995, Nuremberg
- Zwei Ländler (1996) for clarinet and accordion. 17 November 1996, Erlangen
- Signale (2001) for trumpet and organ. 10 November 2001, Munich
- Der Kampf des Enkidu (2002) for 2 percussionists. 21 June 2002, Oberasbach
- Stephanus-Monologe (2002) for clarinet in B and organ. 19 May 2002 Nuremberg (Lorenzkirche; for the inauguration of the Stephanusorgel).
- Pression (2008) for violin and accordion. 2 March 2008, Nuremberg
- Acht Kafka-Skizzen (2008) for piano and accordion. 14 October 2008, Prague

==== Trios ====
- Souvenir d’une vie (1984) for flute, violin and accordion. 23 November 1984, Nuremberg.
- Naive Stücke (2002) for 3 trombones. 22 February 2003 Nuremberg
- ZwôSibenAhteVier (2007) for 3 organs. 18 October 2007 Nuremberg (Lorenzkirche); for the inauguration of the Laurentiusorgel)

==== Quartets ====
- Die drei Teiche von Hellbrunn (1989). 1st string quartet, with soprano solo and double bass: see under Vocal Compositions.
- 2nd String Quartet (1993). 31 July 1994 Hitzacker (Minguet Quartet)
- Wild with love (1997). Chamber music no. (1st movement) for voice, flute, percussion and accordion: see under Vocal compositions.
- Les quatre Anges et les Vents de la Terre (1997) for accordion quartet (3 accordions and basso). 29 April 1998, Nuremberg
- Offertorium (2003) for bassoon quartet (3 bassoons and contrabassoon). 31 July 2005 Langenzenn
- Die Angst des Torhüters (2006) for oboe, clarinet, violin and violoncello. 26 January 2006 Stuttgart (Football-Globus)
- Drei Bilder (2007) for 2 clarinets, alto saxophone and bass clarinet. 26 January 2008, Dithmarschen (Music School)

==== Quintets ====
- Die Versuchung des heiligen Antonius (1986) for 5 accordions. 28 April 1987 Nuremberg. - (1997 version for accordion orchestra).
- Reise nach (1988) for 5 accordions. 23 April 1988 Erlangen

Version for 4 accordions and basso (1997). 10 May 1997 Passau

- Catch (2001) for accordion quintet (4 accordions with M3 and basso). 3 February 2002 Wunsiedel

==== Sextets ====
- Der Schatz des heiligen Laurentius (2008) for brass quintet and organ. 15 July 2008 Nürnberg (Lorenzkirche)

==== Septets ====
- Terpsichore (1986) for 7 percussionists. 14 October 1986 Nürnberg

==== Octets ====
- Annacamento (1996). Kammermusik No.2 für Ensemble (1[Picc].0.1.0 – 0.0.0.0 – Schlagzeug – Klavier – Akkordeon – Streicher: 1.0.1.1.0). Premiere 9 November 1996 Nürnberg (Ensemble Ars Nova, conductor: Werner Heider)
- Faux! (2002) for accordion ensemble (6 accordions with M3 and 2 basso). 19 October 2002, Malden (Netherlands)
