= Ignace Strasfogel =

Polish pianist, composer and conductor

Ignace Strasfogel (17 July 1909 – 6 February 1994) was a Polish pianist, composer and conductor.

== Biography ==
Born in Warsaw, Strasfogel studied at the Hochschule fur Musik in Berlin where he was a pupil of modernist composer Franz Schreker. He began his career as a pianist and vocal coach; notably serving as an accompanist for prestigious artists such as Joseph Szigeti, Gregor Piatigorsky, and Lauritz Melchior among other soloists. In 1926, at the age of 17, his two piano sonatas won the Mendelssohn Prize. In 1934, Strasfogel was forced to emigrate from Nazi Germany to the United States. In America, he worked as a pianist and won fame as conductor of the New York Philharmonic and the Metropolitan Opera.

During the years of 1940 to 1941, and 1962, he conducted the Naumburg Orchestral Concerts, in the Naumburg Bandshell, Central Park, in the summer series.

In 1983, Strasfogel ended a 35-year break from composing, producing works for piano, orchestra, chamber music and songs. Strasfogel died in New York City.

His son Ian Strasfogel (born 1940) is an opera director and librettist.

== Selected works ==
=== Piano ===
- 1923/1924 Capriccio mit alten Tänzen nach acht Kupferstichen von Jakob Callot
- Oktober 1924 Scherzo No.1
- 1925 Sonata No.1
- 1926 Sonata No.2
- 1926 Franz Schreker Collection: six piano transcriptions
- 1927 Piano transcription Franz Schreker Chamber Symphony
- 1946 Preludio fugato
- 1988/1989 Rondo
- 1992 Scherzo No.2

=== Guitar ===
- ca. 1940 Prélude, Elegie und Rondo

=== Chamber music ===
- ca. 1927 String Quartet No. 1
- 1989/1990 String Quartet No. 2

=== Songs ===
- 1985 "Dear Men and Women" for baritone and piano

== Bibliography ==
- Ian Strasfogel: Ignace Strasfogel. The Rediscovery of a Musical Wunderkind. Jewish Miniatures 257A. Hentrich & Hentrich, Leipzig 2020, ISBN 978-3-95565-415-3.
