= Otto Sonnleitner =

Australian rules footballer

Personal information
- Full name: Otto Sonnleitner
- Born: 7 June 1936
- Died: 18 February 2022 (aged 85)
- Original team: Ballarat
- Height: 184 cm (6 ft 0 in)
- Weight: 92 kg (203 lb)

Playing career^{1}
| Years | Club | Games (Goals) |
| 1961 | South Melbourne | 3 (1) |
- ^{1} Playing statistics correct to the end of 1961.

Otto Sonnleitner (7 June 1936 – 18 February 2022) was an Australian rules footballer who played with South Melbourne in the Victorian Football League (VFL).

After football, he became a swimming coach, and was a life member of the Australian Swim Coach and Teachers Association.
