= Hochschule für Musik Würzburg =

University of music in Würzburg, Germany

Coordinates: 49°47′40″N 9°56′26″E

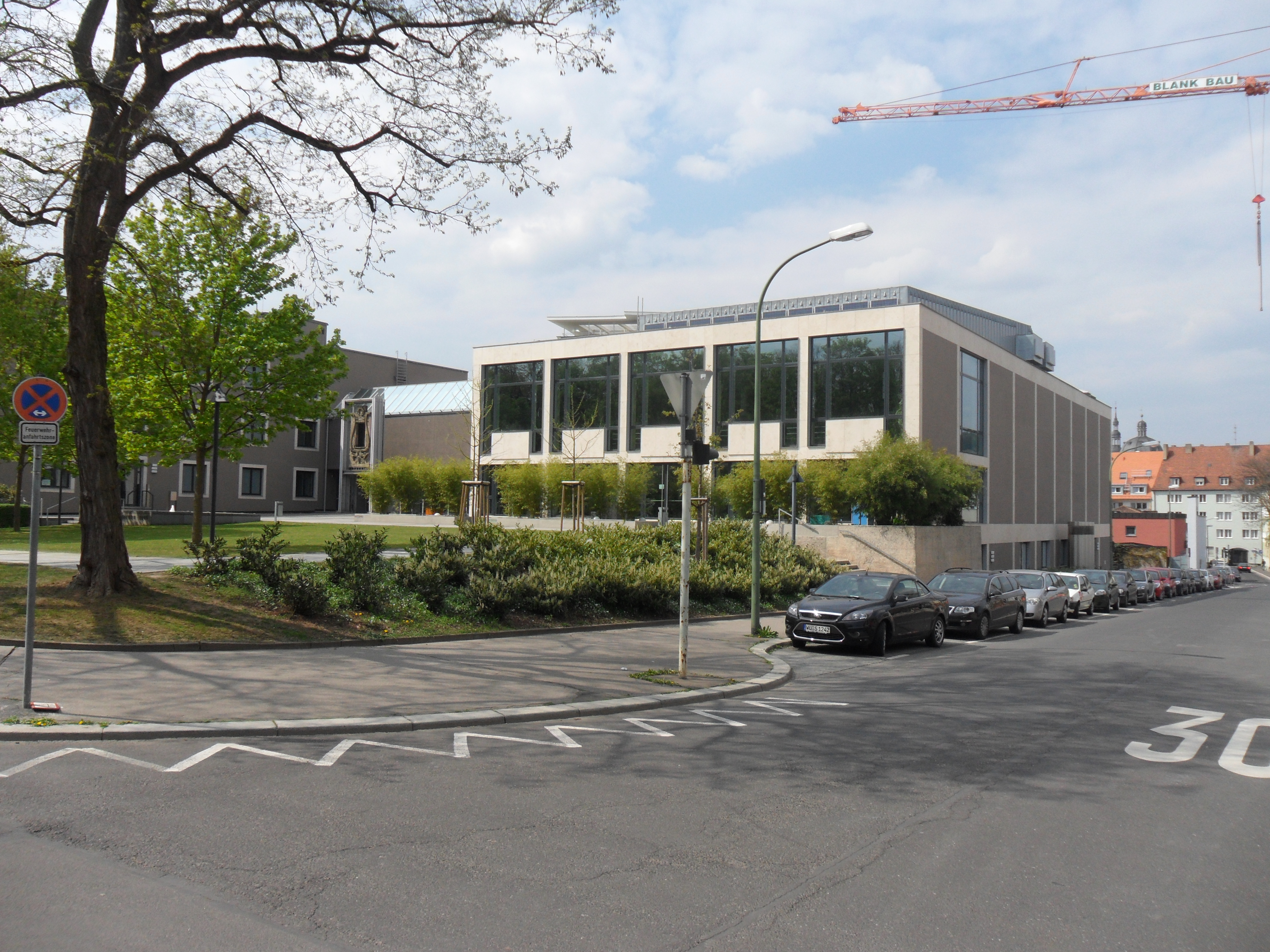
- Former name: Collegium musicum academicum
- Established: 1797; 229 years ago
- Founder: Franz Joseph Fröhlich
- President: Christoph Wünsch
- Students: 650
- Location: Würzburg, Germany
- Website: Official website

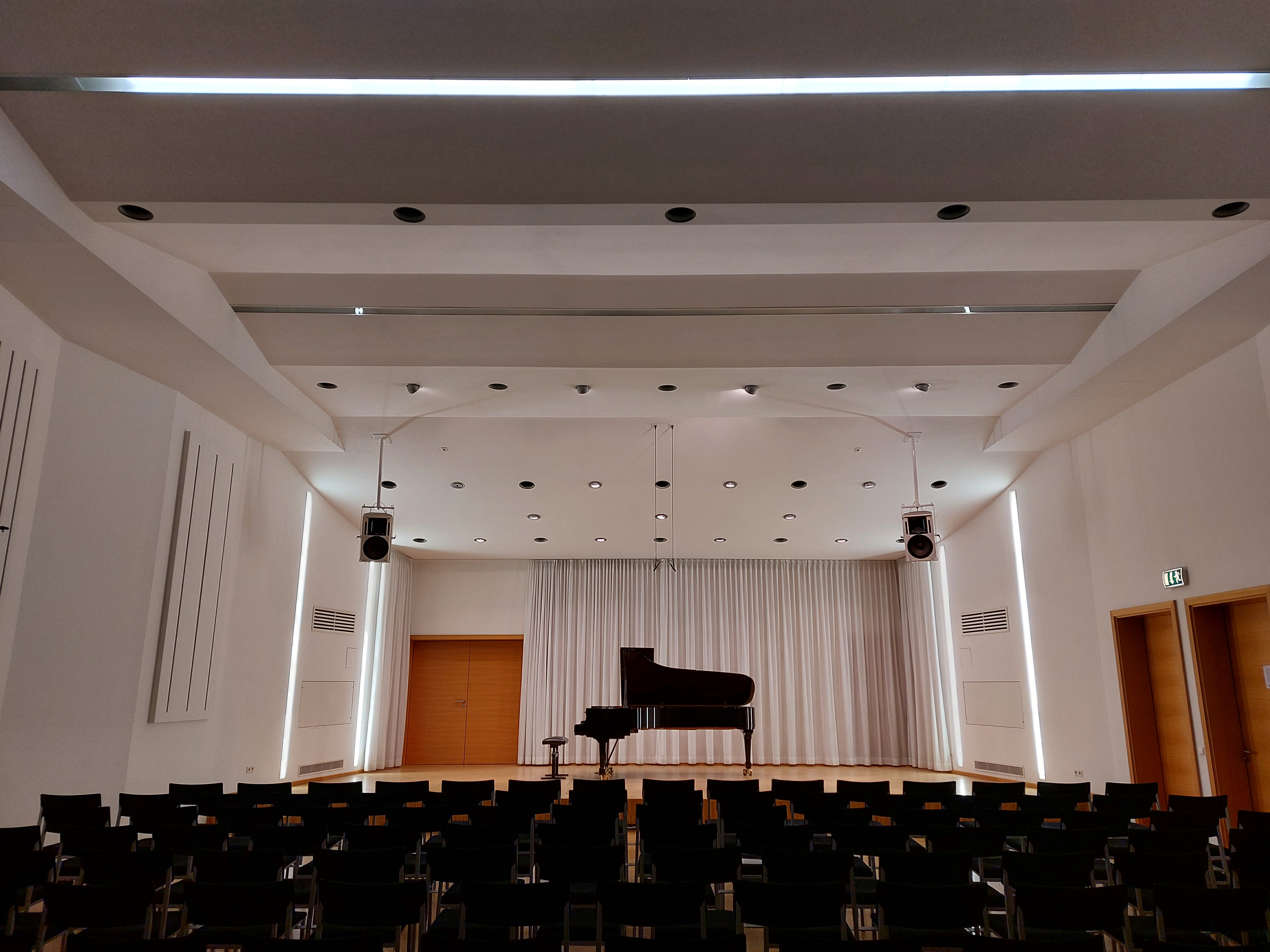
Chamber Music Hall

The Hochschule für Musik Würzburg (University of Music Würzburg) was founded in 1797 by Franz Joseph Fröhlich as Collegium musicum academicum (Academic college of music). From 1921 to 1973, it was named Bayerisches Staatskonservatorium der Musik (Bavarian State Conservatory of Music). The current name was given on 1 September 1973.

It is located in three buildings. The number of full-time students was about 650 in 2007.

== History ==
The Hochschule für Musik Würzburg traces its origins to a music institute founded in 1797 by Franz Joseph Fröhlich, known then as the Collegium musicum. In 1804, it was formally affiliated with the University of Würzburg as an academic music institute, later becoming the Königliches Musikinstitut .

In 1921, the institute was reorganized as the Bayerisches Staatskonservatorium der Musik, a state-run conservatory that continued until 1 September 1973, when it was elevated to Hochschule status and renamed Hochschule für Musik.

In 1997, the institution expanded into a second location at Bibrastraße, supplementing its original site on Hofstallstraße. From 2001, it integrated the Hermann-Zilcher-Conservatory (formerly a municipal academy), adding programs in jazz, accordion, and elementary music education.

Today, the university operates across three buildings in central Würzburg—Hofstallstraße 6–8, Ebracher Gasse 1, and Hofstraße 13—and enrolls approximately 435 students as of the summer semester 2023.

== Subjects ==
The university offers a Bachelor of Music degree in artistic and educational programs:

- accordion
- conducting
- voice
- guitar
- historical instruments
- jazz
- church music
- piano
- composition
- music theory
- orchestral instruments
- organ
- elementary music education

There are several graduate programs and the possibility of promotion. Musically gifted children and adolescents are specifically promoted by the university (musical ECI).

== Study ==
The Hochschule für Musik Würzburg offers degree programs in music performance, education, composition, and related arts disciplines. Its structured academic offerings include:

- Bachelor of Music degrees, typically completed over 8 semesters, in performance (e.g., piano, orchestral instruments, voice, jazz, historical instruments, accordion), compositional study, music theory, church music, and elementary music education.
- Master's programs, generally lasting 4 semesters, continue artistic and pedagogical specialization in similar disciplines and are available to graduates of equivalent bachelor's degrees .
- Konzertexamen, a postgraduate concert diploma, is offered to candidates demonstrating exceptional performance abilities.
- Lehramt Music (Staatsexamen) is offered for secondary-level music teacher training, requiring completion of both artistic and pedagogical coursework.
- Additional options include the Meisterklasse, certificate courses, and limited doctoral (Dr. phil.) programs.

Admission is subject to an entrance examination, which includes practical and theoretical components. Instruction is delivered in small-group formats or individual lessons, especially for performance-related subjects. Study regulations and curricula are defined by Bavarian higher education law and institutional statutes.

Students have access to performance opportunities through concerts, internal exams, and project-based ensembles. The university also participates in international exchange programs, including the Erasmus+ framework.

== Concerts & Events ==
The Hochschule für Musik Würzburg presents a regularly updated concert schedule featuring a variety of performance formats. These include student class recitals, chamber music evenings, and master concerts, often held in its small and main halls at the campus locations on Hofstallstraße and Bibrastraße.

Public performances are typically ticketed, with advance sales via the university ticket office and authorized outlets; there is no box office on the evening of events . The repertoire spans solo, ensemble, orchestral, and vocal works, including both traditional and contemporary compositions .

The university also hosts occasional guest artist recitals, such as visiting jazz musicians, and organizes student-led opera productions. It maintains a formal connection to the city's classical music scene through events like the Mozartfest‑associated Mozartfest-Wettbewerb für Gesang, held approximately every three years since 1977.

== Faculty and alumni ==
- Carlo Buonamici, pianist
- Karl Muck (1859–1940), conductor
- Fritz Huth (1908–1980), hornist
- Bertold Hummel (1925–2002), composer
- Siegfried Fink (1928–2006), percussionist and composer
- Ernst Hoffmann (1928–2016), composer
- Gustav Gunsenheimer (1934–2026), composer
- Martin Göß (1936–2018), trombonist
- Klaus Hinrich Stahmer (born 1941), composer and musicologist
- Heinz Winbeck (1946–2019), composer
- Ulrich Schultheiss (born 1956), composer and academic teacher
- Christoph Bossert (born 1957), organist
- Kolja Lessing (born 1961), violinist, pianist, composer and academic teacher
- Bernd Glemser (born 1962), pianist
- Roland Böer (born 1970), conductor and festival manager
- Martin Berger (born 1972), choral conductor, musicologist and university professor
- Patrick Lange (born 1981), conductor
- Hong Jinho (born 1985), cellist and member of Hoppipolla
- Tianwa Yang (born 1987), violinist
- Tobias Feldmann (born 1991), violinist, finalist of Elisabeth Competition
