= Amal al-Jubouri =

Iraqi writer, poet, translator, journalist and publisher

Amal al-Jubouri

Amal Al-Jubouri (Arabic: أمل الجبوري; born 1967) is an Iraqi writer, poet, translator, journalist, professor and publisher. She has made key contributions in academia, literature, reporting, championing human rights, foreign affairs, and cultural initiatives.

== Biography ==
Al-Jubouri was born in Baghdad in 1967. When she was 19, al-Jubouri's first anthology Wine from Wounds was published. After a dissenting article she wrote came to the notice of Saddam Hussein, al-Jubouri was interrogated and put under surveillance. She fled Iraq and took political asylum in Germany in 1998. She continued writing her poems in Germany, translated German ones into Arabic language and brought out a periodical Diwan. For a brief period, she also served as the cultural counselor for the Yemeni embassy in Berlin.

Her poetry collection Eheduanna, the Priestess of Exile (1999), won the Best Arabic Book Award at a Lebanese book fair. So Much Euphrates Between Us, another volume of her poems was published in 2003. The same year, she returned to Iraq just a few days after the fall of Hussein. In 2011, Hagar Before the Occupation, Hagar After the Occupation, a collection of her Arabic poems translated into English by Rebecca Gayle Howell and Husam Qaisi, was published. It was shortlisted for the 2012 Best Translated Book Award. Library Journal included it in its Best Books of 2011 list.

== See also ==
- Iraqi art
- List of Iraqi artists
