= Fünf Gesänge, Op. 104 (Brahms) =

Fünf Gesänge
- Five part songs by Johannes Brahms
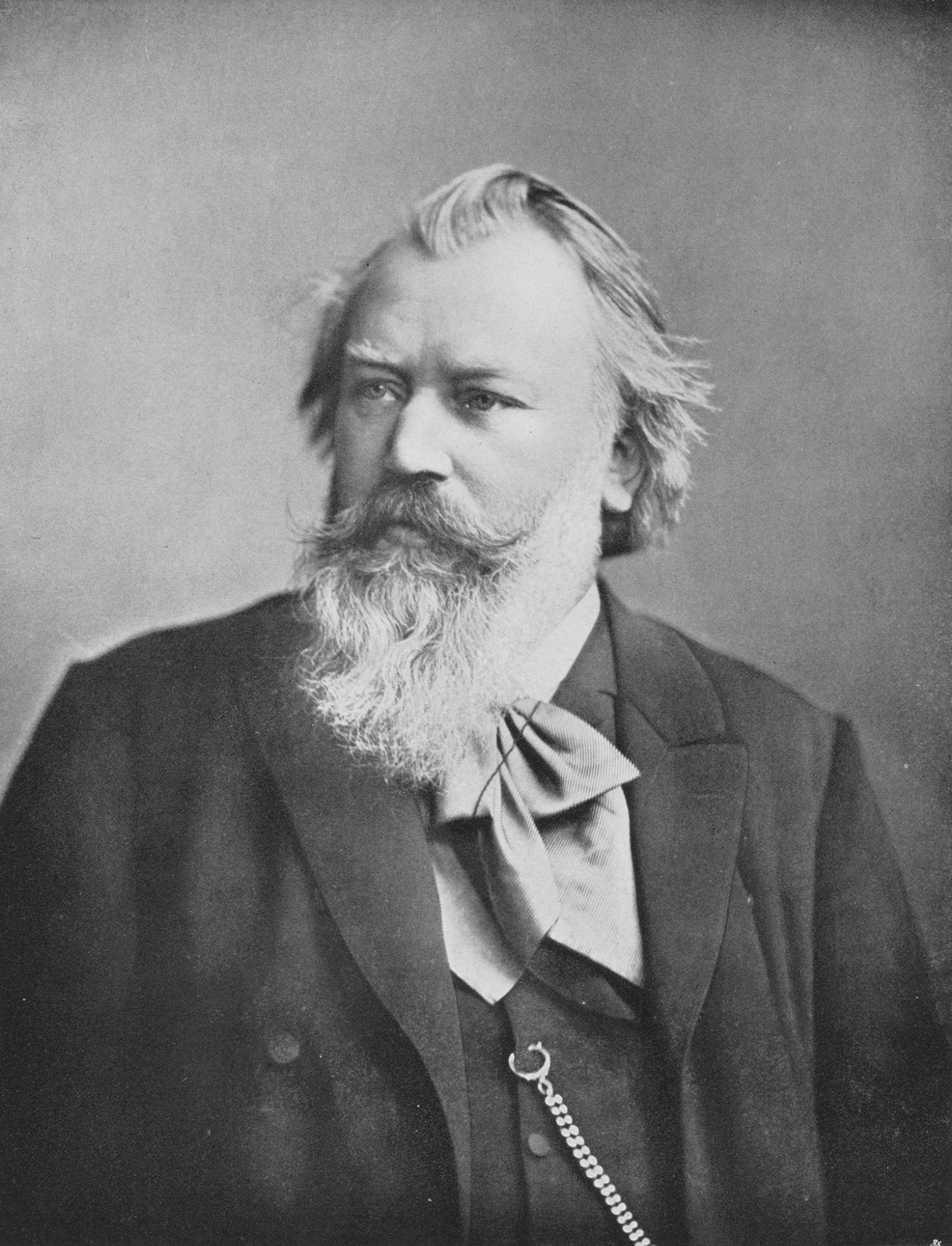
- The composer c. 1888
- Opus: 104
- Composed: 1888
- Scoring: mixed choir

Fünf Gesänge (Five songs), Op. 104, is a song cycle of five part songs for mixed choir a cappella by Johannes Brahms. Composed in 1888 when Brahms was a 55-year-old bachelor, the five songs reflect an intensely nostalgic and even tragic mood. Brahms has chosen texts which centre on lost youth, summer turning into fall and, ultimately, man's mortality. While the score and the parts themselves are not that difficult for the singers, the sombre nature of the texts coupled with intense soaring melodies and complex harmonies make it quite a demanding work for any choir.

== Songs ==
The songs are set for a choir of four to six voices, SATB to SAATBB

1. Nachtwache I (Night Watch I), text by Friedrich Rückert, B minor, SAATBB
  The opening piece sets the atmosphere for the pieces to come with its haunting first bars only. The musical writing reflects the frail beatings of a heart awakened by the breath of love the text speaks about. The dynamics alter swiftly from the soft to the very strong, sounding like the actual breathing of the narrator who seeks an answer to his love.
2. Nachtwache II (Night watch II), text by Rückert, E♭ major, SAATBB
  All at once, the mood is set by a more confident and reassuring tone in the music as well as in the text. The repeated calls of "Ruhn sie?" in all six voices is an imitation of the horns of the night watchmen, telling their listeners to confidently put out their lamps and let themselves be enveloped by the peaceful night. This is the shortest of the five songs, with just 21 bars.
3. Letztes Glück (Last happiness), text by Max Kalbeck, F minor, SAATBB
  Winter is coming and dead leaves from the trees are falling on each other—a picture wonderfully recreated in the music with its swiftly changing chords, sounding like breaths of an autumn wind. These are followed by long and sad melodies in all parts. The piece temporarily switches to the major mode as the narrator experiences a feeling of hope that spring will swiftly come again, but this is quickly crushed by the image of the "late wild rose".
4. Verlorene Jugend (Lost youth, Bohemian poem), D minor, SATBB
  This is the most lively and boisterous song in the series, perhaps due to the folkloristic character of the text. It is clearly divided into two verses, both of which can be divided into a fast and slow part. Once more, the ageing of man is contrasted with nature, particularly in the end, when we realise that while a stone thrown into a stream always resurfaces (portrayed by a fast canon between the baritone and the soprano), youth can never be recovered.
5. Im Herbst (In Autumn), text by Klaus Groth, C minor, SATB
  Definitely a highlight in Brahms's choral output (and a very chilling one at that), Im Herbst can be considered one of the most sombre choral songs ever composed. Written for four parts and easily divided into three verses, its simple structure is deceptive, for this is where the mixed emotions of the previous songs come together to form an impressive climax to this work. Considering pitch, intensity in sound and overall interpretation, Im Herbst is the most difficult song of the five. The parts are repeatedly intertwined and small seconds apart from each other, creating an almost disturbing image of the inevitability of man's own autumn which heralds death. Suddenly, in the third verse, the voices rise and the dynamic level of the piece (which is very quiet throughout) grows to an ultimate high as a tear glitters in the eyes of a man who knows his life will soon be over—but the tear is one of bliss, and the work ends in a quiet and meditative major chord.

== Recordings ==
- NDR Chor, conducted by Günter Jena – Deutsche Grammophon, 1983
- Monteverdi Choir, conducted by John Eliot Gardiner – Philips, 1992
- Kammerchor Stuttgart, conducted by Frieder Bernius – Sony, 1995
- Chamber Choir of Europe, conducted by Nicol Matt – Brilliant, 2003
- Cappella Amsterdam, conducted by Daniel Reuss – Harmonia Mundi, 2014
