= Albert Léon Guérard =

French scholar (1880–1959)

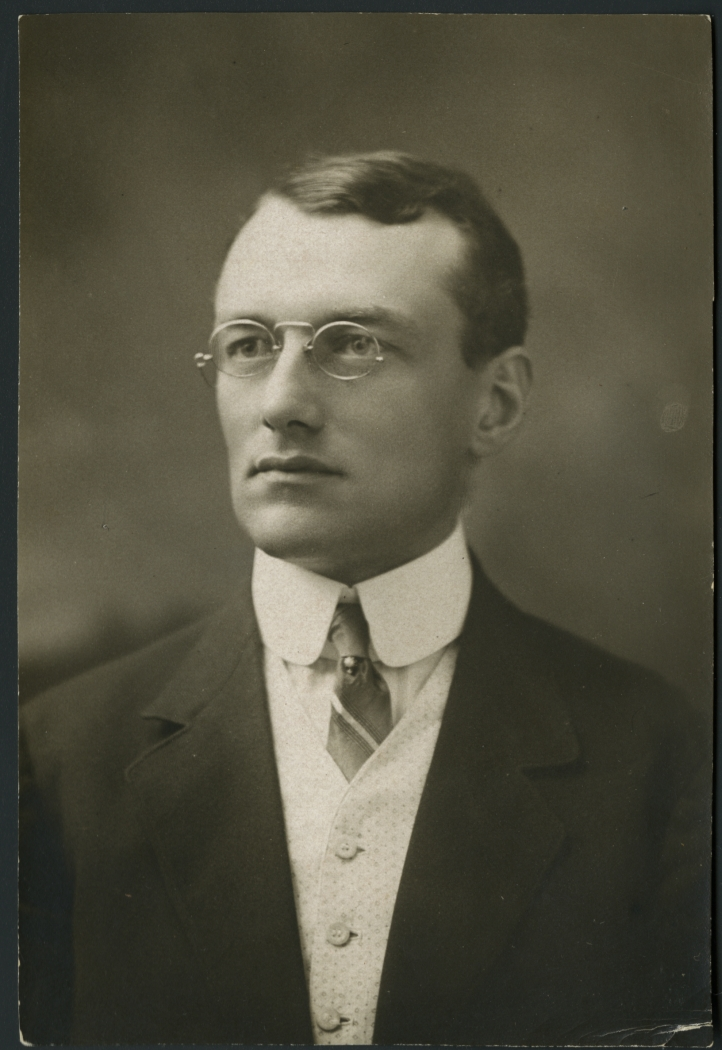
- Born: 3 November 1880; Paris, France
- Died: 1959 (aged 78–79)

Academic work
- Discipline: Comparative literature
- Institutions: École normale supérieure (Paris); University of London; Sorbonne; Stanford University

Albert Léon Guérard (1880–1959) was a prominent French scholar of comparative literature. Guérard taught at Stanford University for many years. A prolific author, he published works on French and European civilization, world literature, and international languages, also holding the position of protector of the Occidental language's Occidental-Academie in 1936.

Guérard was born on 3 November 1880 in Paris.

For two years, Guérard was assistant professor of History at the Paris école normale supérieure. Afterwards, he studying at both the University of London and the Sorbonne – in 1906, he was agrégated at the latter. The same year, he emigrated to the United States, where he taught the French language at Williams College. In 1907, newly wed to Wilhelmina Macartney, he moved to California. Here, Guérard taught French at Stanford University from 1907 to 1913. Until 1924, he taught at Rice Institute in Houston, Texas; his tenure was interrupted by his involvement in the First World War.

== Books ==
- Testament of a liberal. Harvard University Press, 1956.
- Art for art's sake. Lothrop, Lee and Shepard Company, 1936.
- Education of a humanist. Harvard University Press, 1949.
- Preface to world literature. H. Holt and Company, 1940.
- Five masters of French romance with Anatole France, Pierre Loti, Paul Bourget, Maurice Barrès, Romain Rolland. Scribners, 1916.

=== Historical works ===
- French Prophets of Yesterday: A Study of Religious Thought Under the Second Empire.(1913) online; broad-range survey of many French intellectuals
- French civilization in the nineteenth century at Google Books (1914)
- A Short History of the International Language Movement (1921). ISBN 978-1-3768-9811-8 at Google Books
- France in the Classical Age. The Life and Death of an Ideal. Scribners, 1928. ISBN 978-1-4067-0677-2.
- Napoleon III (1943) ISBN 978-0-6742-8429-6.
- France: A Short History. Norton, 1946.
- Napoleon I. (1957)
- French civilization from its origins to the close of the middle ages. (1920)
- Napoléon III. Harvard University Press, 1943.
- Beyond hatred; the democratic ideal in France and America. Negro Universities Press, 1969. ISBN 0-8371-1918-9.

== Sources ==
- Kahn, Sholom J. (1989). "Albert Léon Guérard (1880-1959): the Styles of A Humanist". Virginia Quarterly Review. 65 (3).
- Vaugeois, Dominique (2012). "Albert Guérard: Reworking humanism for a troubled century". The Routledge Companion to World Literature. Routledge. pp. 62–70.
