= Siegfried Fink =

German percussionist and composer

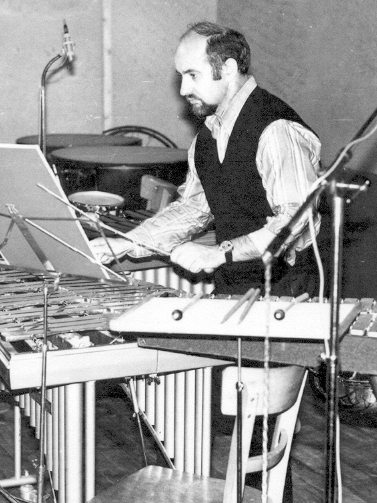
German percussion player, composer and professor Siegfried Fink

Siegfried Fink (born 8 February 1928 in Zerbst/Germany, died 3 May 2006 in Würzburg/Germany) was a German percussionist, composer and professor. He is recognized as an important figure in the development of the professional percussion scene in Germany after World War II.

== Life ==
From 1948 to 1951, Fink studied timpanis and percussion in the class of Alfred Wagner at the University of Music in Weimar (Germany). He also studied composition in the class of Helmut Riethmüller at the same institution. After several orchestral and teaching positions in Weimar, Magdeburg, Lübeck and Hannover, he attained a permanent teaching position for timpani and percussion at the Hochschule für Musik Würzburg. In the year 1974, he was promoted to a full professor and became head of the Studio für Perkussion in Würzburg. He held this position until his retirement in 1993.

== Work ==
Under the guidance of Fink, the Studio für Perkussion in Würzburg became one of the world's most renowned schools for percussion. He educated more than 100 students and claimed, that he developed new teaching methods and new ways of playing percussion instruments, especially concerning contemporary art music. Unfortunately there are no pieces from internationally recognized great composers from Germany or abroad dedicated to him. So it is hard to verify what he actually developed. In the local, maybe German, percussion scene, Fink was known as the self-announced Percussion-Papst (The pope of percussion).

For his achievements in art, music, and teaching, he has been awarded the Bundesverdienstkreuz (Order of Merit of the Federal Republic of Germany), received some art prizes and was honoured with doctorates of the Universities for Music of Sofia and Barcelona, where his students got a teaching position. For his life work in teaching he received the Lifetime Achievement in Education Award from the Percussive Arts Society of the US.

His artistic and creative work is documented in more than 20 disc recordings (mostly LP). Fink also conducted several percussion groups. He founded numerous percussion editions in cooperation with several European publishers. Under his guidance the first curriculum for teaching percussion instruments in German music schools has been developed. Nevertheless his influence outside of Germany is minimal.

=== Critics ===
Some of Fink’s more famous colleagues considered his work as relatively meaningless. He was criticised from the orchestral players as well as from the contemporary music players for not doing a proper education in the real literature (orchestral studies, serious contemporary compositions for percussion solo, contemporary compositions for percussion ensemble). He was considered being overrated due to the fact of own claims instead of witness-able acts. To his strongest antipodes belonged the Munich percussion school under Prof. Karl Peinkofer and Hermann Gschwendtner (Academy Trossingen), Prof. K. Tresselt (Academy Stuttgart), Prof. Sneguriov (Conservatory Moscow), and Prof. B. Wulff (Academy Freiburg).

Fink composed more than 160 pieces of music intended more for study than for performance purposes. His music comprises solo works as well as chamber music, ballet music and movie scores. Some of his students received prizes at international competitions and became known percussionists.
