= Patrick Lange (conductor) =

German conductor

- Born: 12 April 1981 (age 45); Roth, Bavaria, Germany
- Education: Regensburger Domspatzen; Hochschule für Musik Würzburg; Zürcher Hochschule der Künste
- Occupation: Conductor

Patrick Lange (born 12 April 1981) is a German conductor.

== Biography ==
Born in Roth, Lange grew up in Greding. He was a member of the boys' choir Regensburger Domspatzen with conductors Georg Ratzinger and Roland Büchner. At age 12, he decided to become a conductor. At age 16, he conducted his first premiere, a youth club production of Stephen Sondheim's Zustände wie im alten Rom (A Funny Thing Happened on the Way to the Forum), at the Stadttheater Regensburg. After his Abitur, he studied conducting with Hans-Rainer Förster and Peter Falk at the Hochschule für Musik Würzburg and with Johannes Schlaefli at the Zurich University of the Arts.

From 2005, Lange was supported by the Dirigentenforum of the Deutscher Musikrat. Claudio Abbado made him assistant conductor of the Gustav Mahler Jugendorchester the same year. Lange assisted Abbado also with the Berliner Philharmoniker, the Orchestra Mozart in Bologna and the orchestra of the Lucerne Festival. He made his debut at the Komische Oper Berlin in 2007, conducting Mozart's Le nozze di Figaro. Lange became First Kapellmeister there in 2008 and principal conductor in 2010.

In 2009, Lange first conducted at the Glyndebourne Festival, in 2010 at the Vienna State Opera, in 2011 at the Royal Opera House in London, in 2012 at the Semperoper in Dresden, and in 2013 at the Bavarian State Opera in Munich. He became Generalmusikdirektor of the Hessisches Staatstheater Wiesbaden from the 2017/18 season. He opened his first season there with Mozart's Die Zauberflöte for children, and conducted new productions of Wagner's Tannhäuser, Verdi's Un ballo in maschera and Arabella by Richard Strauss. The performance of Tannhäuser, with Lance Ryan in the title role and Sabina Cvilak as Elisabeth, staged by Uwe Eric Laufenberg, was recorded live. His contract in Wiesbaden was extended to the end of the 2022/23 season. In September 2021, Lange requested to be released from his Wiesbaden contract, ahead of the originally scheduled 2022–2023 season conclusion.

Lange is a member of the advisory board of the Young Euro Classic festival in Berlin and of the Kuratorium of the Festival junger Künstler Bayreuth.

== Awards ==
- 2000–2004: Scholarship of the Konrad-Adenauer-Stiftung
- 2005–2010: Scholarship of the Dirigentenforum des Deutschen Musikrates
- 2007: Europäischer Kulturpreis (Förderpreis für junge Dirigenten)
- 2009: Eugen Jochum scholarship of the Bavarian Radio Symphony Orchestra
