= Early life of Pope Benedict XVI =

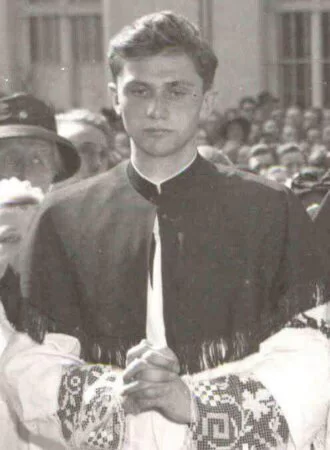
Ratzinger in seminary (1950 or 1951)

The early life of Pope Benedict XVI (born Joseph Alois Ratzinger) concerns the period from his birth in 1927 through the completion of his education and ordination in 1951.

== Background and childhood (1927–1943) ==
Joseph Alois Ratzinger was born on 16 April 1927 (Holy Saturday) at 11 Schulstrasse, his parents' home in Marktl am Inn, Bavaria, and baptised on the same day. He was the third and youngest child of Joseph Ratzinger Sr. (1877–1959), a police officer, and his wife, Maria (née Peintner) (1884–1963), whose family were from South Tyrol. His father served in both the Bavarian State Police (Landespolizei) and the German national Regular Police (Ordnungspolizei) before retiring in 1937 to the town of Traunstein. The Sunday Times described the older Ratzinger as "an anti-Nazi whose attempts to rein in Hitler's Brown Shirts forced the family to move several times." According to the International Herald Tribune, these relocations were directly related to Joseph Ratzinger Sr.'s continued resistance to Nazism, which resulted in demotions and transfers.

His elder brother, Georg (15 January 1924 – 1 July 2020) also became a priest. Their sister Maria, born in 1921, managed Joseph's household until her death in 1991, fulfilling a promise she made to their parents to take care of her brothers. She never married. Their great uncle, Georg Ratzinger, was a priest and member of the Reichstag, as the German Parliament was then called.

Georg Ratzinger said: "Our father was a bitter enemy of Nazism because he believed it was in conflict with our faith". The family encountered the Nazi regime's euthanasia program for the handicapped. Biographer John L. Allen Jr. reports a revelation made by Cardinal Ratzinger at a conference in the Vatican on 28 November 1996: "Ratzinger had a cousin with Down's Syndrome who in 1941 was 14 years old. This cousin was just a few months younger than Ratzinger and was taken away by the Nazi authorities for "therapy". Not long afterwards, the family received word that he was dead, presumably one of the 'undesirables' eliminated during that time."

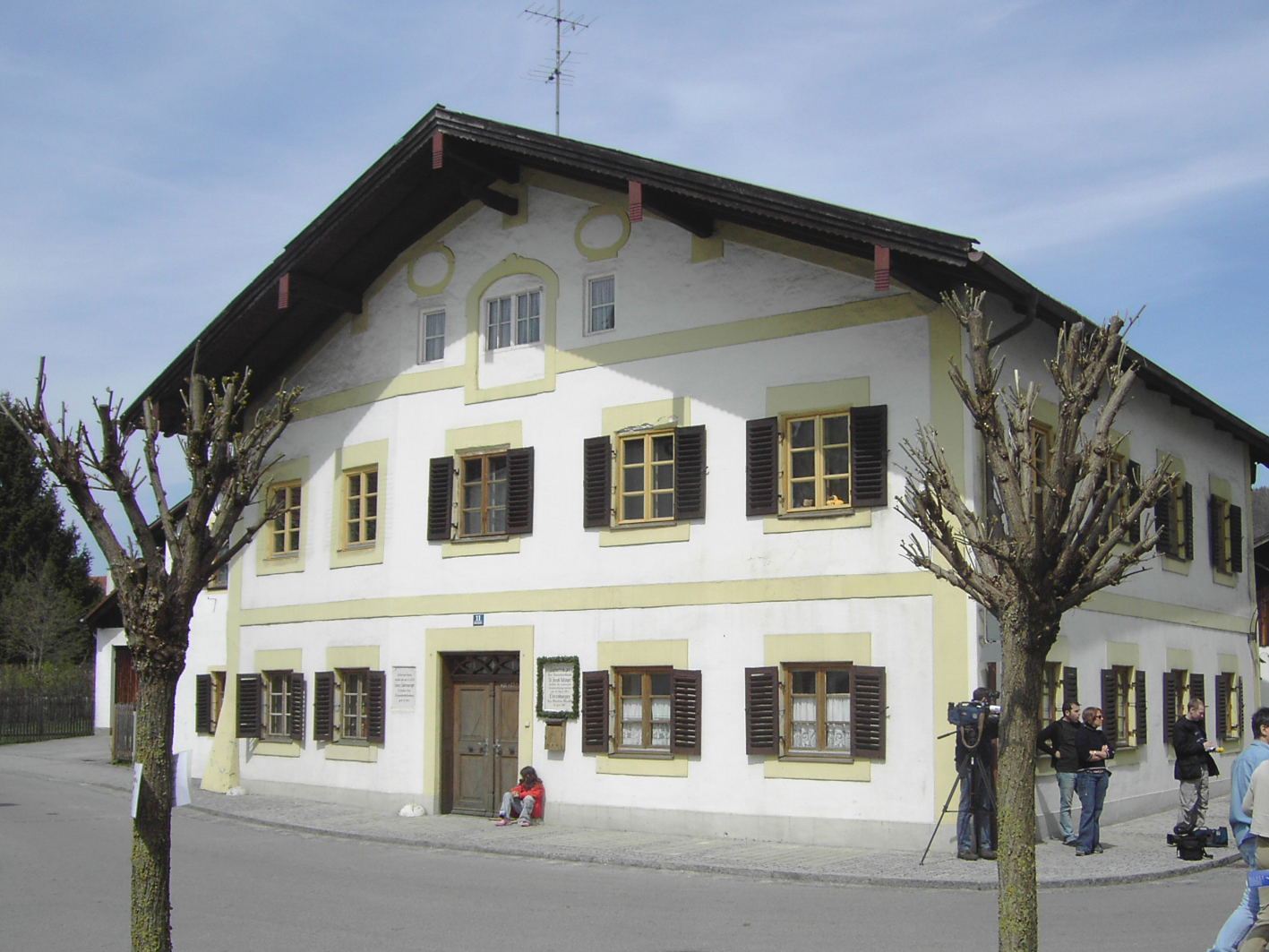
Ratzinger's birthplace and childhood home in Marktl am Inn. The building still stands today.

According to his cousin Erika Kopper, Ratzinger had no desire from childhood to be anything other than a priest. She stated that, at the age of 15, he announced that he was going to be a bishop, whereupon she playfully remarked: "And why not Pope?". An even earlier incident occurred in 1932, when Michael Cardinal von Faulhaber, Archbishop of Munich, visited the small town in which the Ratzinger family lived, arriving in a black limousine. The future pope, then five years old, was part of a group of children who presented the cardinal with flowers, and later that day Ratzinger announced he wanted to be a cardinal, too. "It wasn't so much the car, since we weren't technically minded", Georg Ratzinger told a reporter from The New York Times. "It was the way the cardinal looked, his bearing, and the knickerbockers he was wearing that made such an impression on him."

In 1939, aged 12, he enrolled in a minor seminary in Traunstein. This period lasted until the seminary was closed for military use in 1942, and the students were all sent home. Ratzinger returned to the Gymnasium in Traunstein. During this period in the seminary, following his 14th birthday in 1941, Ratzinger was enrolled in the Hitler Youth, as membership was legally required as of 25 March 1939. Following the seminary closure he continued required attendance with the Hitler Youth to avoid financial penalties in the Gymnasium tuition fees. The financial penalty (which theoretically required documentation of attendance at Hitler Youth activities) was overlooked when a sympathetic mathematics professor allowed him not to attend any meetings. In Ratzinger's book Salt of the Earth, Ratzinger says the following "... Thank goodness, there was a very understanding mathematics teacher. He himself was a Nazi but an honest man, who said to me, 'Just go once and get the document so that we have it' ... When he saw that I simply didn't want to, he said, 'I understand, I'll take care of it', and so I was able to stay free of it."

After Joseph Ratzinger was elected pontiff in 2005, following the death of Pope John Paul II, a neighbor from Traunstein, Elizabeth Lohner, then 84 years old, was quoted in the 17 April 2005 edition of The Times ("Papal hopeful is a former Hitler Youth"), asserting, "[I]t was possible to resist, and those people set an example for others. The Ratzingers were young and had made a different choice." Lohner's brother-in-law was a conscientious objector who spent two years at Dachau for his beliefs.

== Military service (1943–1945) ==
Joseph Alois Ratzinger
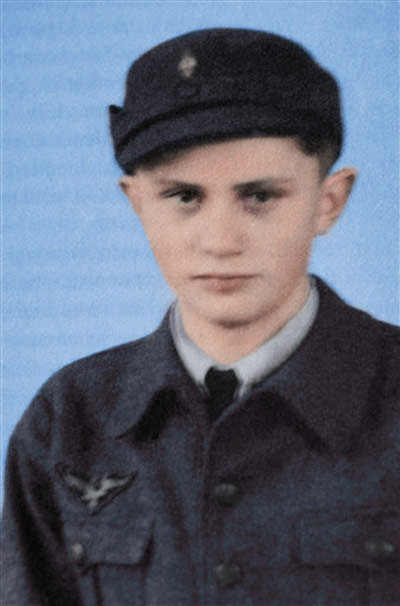
- Military career
- Allegiance: Nazi Germany (to 1945)
- Branch: Wehrmacht; Reichsarbeitsdienst; Luftwaffenhelfer
- Service years: 1943–1945
- Conflicts: World War II; Invasion of Germany (POW)

In 1943, when he was 16, Joseph Ratzinger was drafted with many of his classmates into the Luftwaffenhelfer program. They were posted first to Ludwigsfeld, north of Munich, as part of a detachment responsible for guarding a BMW aircraft engine plant. Next they were sent to Unterföhring, northwest of Munich, and briefly to Innsbruck. From Innsbruck, their unit went to Gilching to protect the jet fighter base meant to attack Allied bombers as they massed to begin their runs towards Munich. At Gilching, Ratzinger served in a telephone communications post. On 10 September 1944, his class was released from the Corps. Returning home, Ratzinger had already received a new draft notice for the Reichsarbeitsdienst. He was posted to the Hungarian border area of Austria; Austria having been annexed by Germany in the Anschluss of 1938. When Hungary was occupied by the Red Army Ratzinger was put to work setting up anti-tank defences in preparation for the expected Red Army offensive.

On 20 November 1944, his unit was released from service. Joseph Ratzinger again returned home. After three weeks passed, he was drafted into the German army at Munich and assigned to the infantry barracks in the center of Traunstein, the city near which his family lived. After basic infantry training, he served at various posts around the city with his unit. They were never sent to the front. In late April or early May, shortly before Germany's surrender, he deserted. Desertions were widespread during the last weeks of the war, although deserters were subject to death if caught. However, diminished morale and equally diminished risk of prosecution from a preoccupied and disorganized German military contributed to the growing wave of soldiers looking toward self-preservation. He left the city of Traunstein and headed for his nearby village. "I used a little-known back road hoping to get through unmolested. But, as I walked out of a railroad underpass, two soldiers were standing at their posts, and for a moment the situation was extremely exciting for me. Thank God that they, too, had had their fill of war and did not want to become murderers." They used the excuse of his arm being in a sling to let him go home.

Soon after, two SS members were given shelter at the Ratzinger family house, and they began to make enquiries about the presence there of a young man of military age. Joseph Ratzinger Sr. made clear to these SS men his ire against Adolf Hitler, but the two disappeared the next day without taking any action against the Ratzinger family. Cardinal Ratzinger wrote in his memoirs: "A special angel seemed to be guarding us."

When the Americans arrived in the village, "I was identified as a soldier, had to put back on the uniform I had already abandoned, had to raise my hands and join the steadily growing throng of war prisoners whom they were lining up on our meadow. It especially cut my good mother's heart to see her boy and the rest of the defeated army standing there, exposed to an uncertain fate..." Ratzinger was briefly interned in a POW camp near Ulm and was released on 19 June 1945. He and another young man began to walk the 120 km (75 mi) home but got a lift to Traunstein in a milk truck. The family was reunited when his brother, Georg, returned after being released from a POW camp in Italy.

== Priestly formation (1946–1951) ==
Following repatriation in 1945, both Ratzinger brothers entered a Catholic seminary in Freising, and later studied at the Herzogliches Georgianum of LMU Munich. According to an interview with Peter Seewald, Ratzinger and his fellow students were particularly influenced by the works of Gertrud von Le Fort, Ernst Wiechert, Fyodor Dostoyevsky, Elisabeth Langgässer, Theodor Steinbüchel (de), Martin Heidegger and Karl Jaspers. The young Ratzinger saw the last three in particular as a break with the dominance of neo-Kantianism, with the key work being Steinbüchel's Die Wende des Denkens (The Change in Thinking). By the end of his studies, he was drawn more to the active Saint Augustine than to Thomas Aquinas, and among the scholastics he was more interested in Saint Bonaventure. On 29 June 1951, the brothers, along with other seminarians from Traunstein seminary, were ordained in Freising by Cardinal Faulhaber of Munich. His dissertation (1953) was on Augustine, entitled "The People and the House of God in Augustine's Doctrine of the Church", and his Habilitationsschrift (a dissertation which serves as qualification for a professorship) was on Bonaventure. It was completed in 1957 and he became a professor of Freising college in 1958.

== Notes ==
1. Times Online (UK) 17 April 2005 ("Papal hopeful is a former Hitler Youth")
2. International Herald Tribune 22 April 2005. "A boy's dreams lead from a village to the Vatican" (reprinted from The New York Times)
3. The New York Times, 21 April 2005. "A Future Pope Is Recalled: A Lover of Cats and Mozart, Dazzled by Church as a Boy"
4. National Catholic Reporter, 14 October 2005. "Anti-Nazi Prelate Beatified. The conference took place under the auspices of the Pontifical Council for Health Care. At the present date (January 2006) there is no reference to this Conference at the Vatican's website.
5. "Cousin recalls boy who dreamed of church life". The Age. April 21, 2005.
6. "Hitler Youth—Prelude to War. 1933–1938", historyplace.com. Accessed 23 February 2024.

== Biography ==
- Ratzinger, Georg, My brother the Pope (Ignatius Press 2012) ISBN 978-1-58617-704-1
