= Stefan Rauh =

German conductor (1963 – 2023)

Stefan Rauh (22 February 1963 – 8 June 2023) was a German conductor, publisher (Sonat-Verlag), church musician and composer.

== Biography ==
Stefan Rauh was born in Bayreuth and attended the music gymnasium of the Regensburger Domspatzen. During his time at gymnasium he was a member of the Regensburger cathedral chorus. During his studies (Latin, Philosophy and Church Music) with Norbert Düchtel, Eberhart Georg Ratzinger and Roland Büchner, he returned to the Regensburger cathedral chorus, this time as conductor. His musical studies were complemented by postgraduate studies of 'choir conducting' with Uwe Gronostay at the University of Arts Berlin and Master courses with Eric Ericson and Howard Arman.

Following his studies, Rauh was assistant of professor Uwe Gronostay in the Philharmonischen Chor Berlin and other professional choirs. As artistic director of various vocal ensembles, the 'Rothenfelsen Chorwochen', as lecturer in choir conduction courses nationally and internationally as well as author of essays and reviews in professional journals he earned international publicity.

Since 1990, Rauh was working as a church musician. From 1995 to 2010 he was church musician of the church Heilige Familie in Berlin-Lichterfelde (archdiocese Berlin). As composer and publisher he dedicates himself to works of choral and instrumental music. Stefan Rauh was conductor of the choir of the Johanneskirche Berlin-Schlachtensee as well as the Kammerchor Berlin.

In 2000 Stefan Rauh founded the 'Berliner Chormusik Verlag' in Berlin. Originally, his publishing was specialised on editions of choir music only. In 2009 the publishing range was expanded by the editions of 'Edition Musica Rinata', so that the variety of published works now also included compositions for organ and other instruments. The programs of both publishing houses, now consolidated, were developed further. 2013 the company moved to Kleinmaschnow, Potsdam. January 2015 both company parts were united under the name Sonat-Verlag.

== Selected compositions ==
=== Vocal ===
- Ave Maria, for choir (SSAATTBB), Sonat-Verlag.
- Christe, du Lamm Gottes, for choir (SATB), Sonat- Verlag, on "Christe, du Lamm Gottes".
- Drei französische Weisen, for wind quartet, Sonat-Verlag.
- Ein Haus voll Glorie schauet, on the hymn "Ein Haus voll Glorie schauet", for choir (SAB), Sonat-Verlag.
- Heilig ist Gott in Herrlichkeit, for choir (SATB), Sonat-Verlag.
- Komm, du Heiland aller Welt, for choir (SATB), Sonat-Verlag.
- Komm, Schöpfer Geist, variations for organ, Sonat-Verlag.
- Kündet allen in der Not, for choir (SATB), Sonat-Verlag.
- Kyrie, for choir (SSAATTBB), Sonat-Verlag.
- Lobe den Herren, for choir (SATB), Sonat-Verlag.
- Mit Ernst, o Menschenkinder, for choir (SATB), Sonat-Verlag.
- O du fröhliche, for choir (SATB), Sonat-Verlag.
- Stille Nacht, for choir (SATB), Sonat-Verlag.

=== Instrumental ===
- Drei französische Weisen nach alten Drehorgelmelodien aus dem 18. Jahrhundert, für Bläserquartett, Sonat-Verlag 2015.
- Ist das der Leib, Herr Jesus Christ. Liedpartita zum Osterfest, für Orgel manualiter, Sonat-Verlag 2015.
- Zu Bethlehem geboren, variations for organ on "Zu Bethlehem geboren", Sonat-Verlag.

== Sources ==
- Musica sacra 6/2013. Inspirierend und wegweisend. Rothenfelser Chorwoche.
