= Schrems =

Schrems may refer to:

== People ==
- Max Schrems (born 1987), Austrian activist, lawyer, and author
- Theobald Schrems (1893–1963), German choir director

== Places in Austria ==
- Schrems, Lower Austria, a municipality
- Schrems bei Frohnleiten, Styria, a former municipality
