= Lachner =

Lachner is a German surname. Notable people with the surname include:

- Ernest A. Lachner (1915–1996), American ichthyologist
- Franz Lachner (1803–1890), German composer
- Ignaz Lachner (1807–1895), German conductor, composer
- Ludwig Lachner (1910–2003), German footballer
- Roberto Garcia Lachner (born 1977), Costa Rican triathlete
- Vinzenz Lachner (1811–1893), German conductor, composer

== See also ==
- Lackner (surname)
