= Lackner =

Lackner is a surname. Notable people with the surname include:

- Bede Lackner (1927–2020), Hungarian-American, Catholic priest and monk of the Cistercian Order
- Erich Lackner (1913–1992), German engineer
- Franz Lackner (born 1956), Austrian prelate
- Hans Lackner (1876–1930), Austrian stage and film actor
- Helen Lackner, French writer and researcher
- Henry George Lackner (1851–1925), Canadian politician
- Hermann Lackner (born 1933), Austrian cross-country skier.
- Jeffrey M. Lackner (born 1961), American clinical psychologist, educator, and researcher
- Klaus Lackner, American physicist
- Lisa Lackner (born 1982), Austrian racing cyclist
- Markus Lackner (born 1991), Austrian professional footballer
- Rich Lackner (born 1956), American football coach
- Walter Lackner, Austrian para-alpine skier

== See also ==
- Lachner (surname)
