= Franz Lehrndorfer =

German organist, composer, and pedagogue

- Born: 10 August 1928; Salzburg
- Died: 10 January 2013 (aged 84); Munich
- Occupations: Organist; Composer; Pedagogue
- Organizations: Frauenkirche in Munich; Musikhochschule München
- Awards: ARD International Music Competition; Bavarian Order of Merit; Order of Merit of the Federal Republic of Germany; Order of St. Gregory the Great

Franz Lehrndorfer (10 August 1928 – 10 January 2013) was a German organist, composer, and pedagogue.

== Biography ==
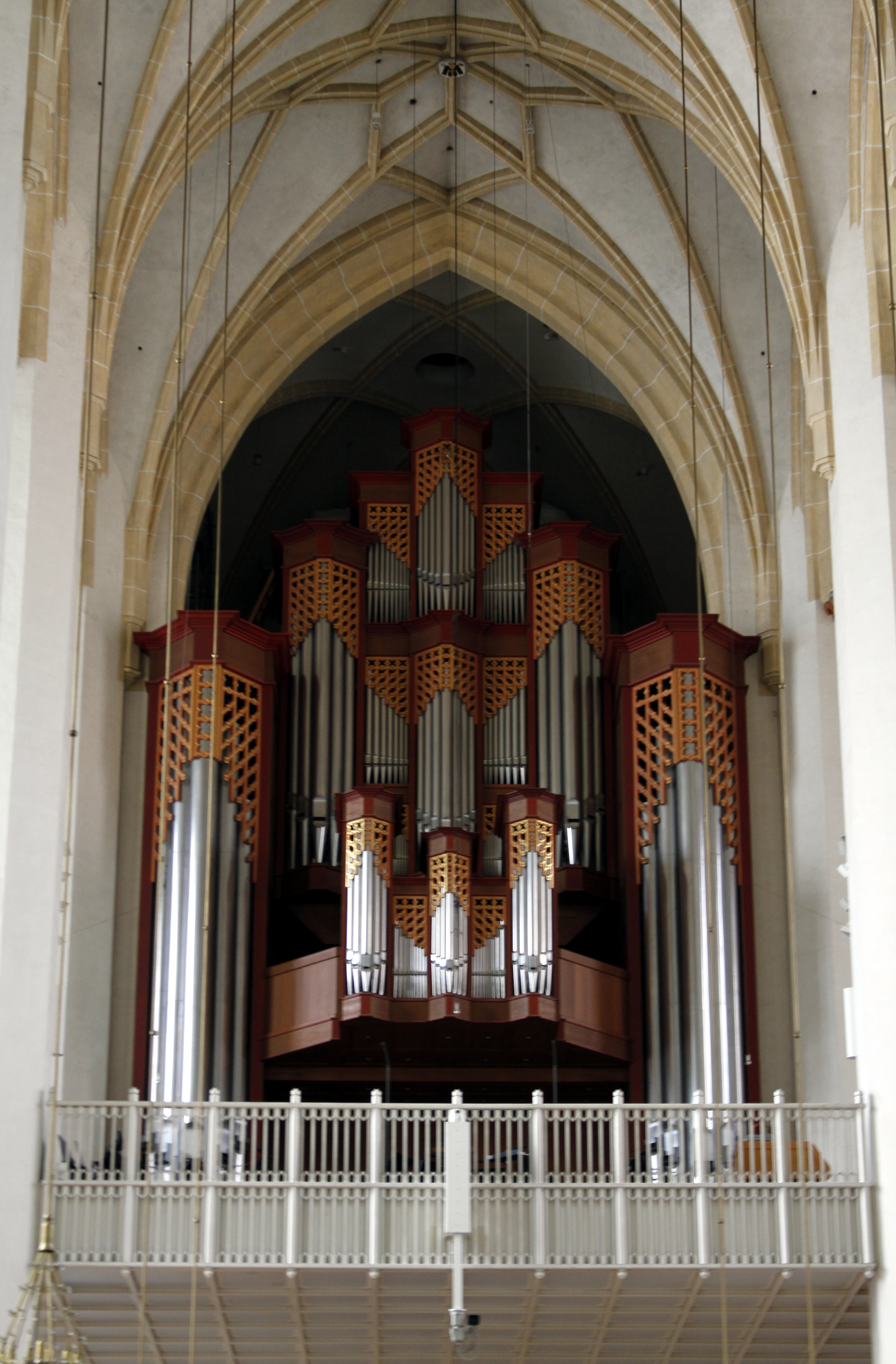
Main Organ from Georg Jann (1994) at the Frauenkirche in Munich

Franz Lehrndorfer was born in Salzburg and spent his youth in Kempten. He received his first music lessons from his father, a choir director and musicologist and began to play the organ at age nine. From 1948 until 1951, Lehrndorfer studied sacred music in Munich and obtained a master class diploma in organ performance in 1952. Upon graduation, he worked as music instructor for the Regensburger Domspatzen, under music director Theobald Schrems. In 1962, he began his teaching career at the Musikhochschule München, first as adjunct professor of organ, later (from 1969 until 1993) as professor and department chair of sacred music and organ performance. From 1969 until 31 October 2002, Lehrndorfer was organist at the Frauenkirche in Munich. He left his cathedral appointment after major disagreements with the cathedral’s music director, Karl-Friedrich Nies.

Lehrndorfer focused on organ improvisations, both in concert and recordings. As a performer, he often included music by Johann Sebastian Bach and Max Reger, as well as works by contemporary composers, such as Karl Höller and Harald Genzmer, in his programs. In 2001, he played the premiere of Genzmer's Concerto for organ, which he subsequently edited for Schott Music.

As an organ consultant, Lehrndorfer was in charge of several major organ projects, such as the 1980 Georg Jann organ at Tegernsee Abbey, or the four organs at the Frauenkirche in Munich (1993/1994).

On the occasion of Lehrndorfers 80th anniversary in 2008, more than 50 of his former students celebrated at the Musikhochschule Munich. Franz Lehrndorfer died at age 84 in a hospital in Munich.

== Awards ==
- 1957: First Prize in Organ Performance, ARD International Music Competition
- 1970: Bavarian Order of Merit
- 1981: Deutscher Schallplattenpreis (LP Recording, "Organ Music from Munich Cathedral." Munich: Calig Label)
- 1983: Cross of Merit, Order of Merit of the Federal Republic of Germany
- 1997: Officer's Cross of Merit, Order of Merit of the Federal Republic of Germany
- 1998: Knight Commander, Order of St. Gregory the Great
- 1999: Honorary Doctorate, Pontifical Institute of Sacred Music

== Students ==
Many of Franz Lehrndorfer's former organ students became concert organists, obtained positions at important churches or faculty positions in Germany and abroad:

- Martin Bernreuther (Eichstätt Cathedral)
- Winfried Bönig (Cologne Cathedral)
- Christian Brembeck
- Roland Büchner (Regensburg Cathedral)
- Gabriel Dessauer (St. Bonifatius, Wiesbaden)
- Harald Feller (Musikhochschule München)
- Marlene Hinterberger (Musikhochschule München)
- Wolfgang Hörlin (Musikhochschule München)
- Rudolf Kelber (Hauptkirche St. Jacobi, Hamburg)
- Edgar Krapp (Musikhochschule Frankfurt, Musikhochschule München)
- Hans Leitner (Passau Cathedral, since 2003 Frauenkirche Munich)
- Wolfram Menschick (Eichstätt Cathedral)
- Tomas Adam Nowak (Musikhochschule Detmold)
- Ludwig Ruckdeschel (Passau Cathedral)
- Klemens Schnorr (Musikhochschule Freiburg, Freiburg Minster)
- Josef Still (Trier Cathedral)
- Gerhard Weinberger (Musikhochschule Detmold)
- Markus Willinger (Bamberg Cathedral)
- Elisabeth Zawadke (Lucerne School of Music)

== Compositions ==
=== Organ ===
- Eight Variations on "Maria, dich lieben" (Munich: Opus-Verlag, 1995)
- Nine Choral Preludes on Christmas chorals from the Gotteslob hymnal (Eichstätt: Jubilate, 2001)
- Theme and eleven Variations on "Morgen kommt der Weihnachtsmann" (Munich: Opus-Verlag, 2002)
- Easy Preludes to Advent and Christmas chorals from the "Gotteslob" hymnal (Munich: Opus-Verlag, 2003)
- Organ Preludes to Easter chorals from the "Gotteslob" hymnal (Eichstätt: Jubilate, 2007)
- Introduction, Variations, Fugue, and Hymnus on "Gott mit dir, du Land der Bayern" (Eichstätt: Jubilate, 2008)
- "Nun freut euch, ihr Christen" (Munich: Opus-Verlag, 2008)
- "Wachet auf, ruft uns die Stimme" (Munich: Opus-Verlag, 2009)
- Concerti antici "Wie schön leuchtet der Morgenstern" and "Lobet den Herren" (Eichstätt: Jubilate, 2010)
- Meditation and Variations on "O du fröhliche" (Eichstätt: Jubilate, 2010)
- Variations on "Zu Bethlehem geboren" (Eichstätt: Jubilate, 2010)
- Partita on "Macht hoch die Tür" (Munich: Opus-Verlag, 2011)
- Fanfare, in: Kölner Fanfaren, ed. Winfried Bönig and Hans-Peter Bähr (Bonn: Dr. J. Butz, 2012)
- Alla Marcia mit Musette, in: Festliche Orgelmusik (vol. 4), ed. Wolfgang Bretschneider (Bonn: Dr. Josef Butz, 2014)
- Fifteen Choral Preludes on hymns from the "Gotteslob" hymnal and the Protestant hymnal (Evangelisches Gesangbuch) (Munich: Opus-Verlag, 2015)

=== Piano ===
- Music for Christmas Time (Munich: Opus-Verlag, 2007)
- "Nun freut euch, ihr Christen" (Munich: Opus-Verlag, 2008)
- Four Variations on "Sankt Martin" (Munich: Opus-Verlag, 2015)

=== Piano for four hands ===
- Music for Christmas Time (Munich: Opus-Verlag, 2007)

=== Vocal works ===
- Sah ein Knab ein Röslein stehn & Zogen einst fünf wilde Schwäne for SATB choir (Eichstätt: Jubilate, 1978)
- Zu Bethlehem geboren & In dulci jubilo for SATB choir (Eichstätt: Jubilate, 1978)
- Kein schöner Land setting "Kein schöner Land" for SATB choir (Eichstätt: Jubilate, 1981)
- Schlaf wohl, du Himmelsknabe for two flutes, cello, and SATB choir (Eichstätt: Jubilate, 1982)
- Kein Feuer, keine Kohle & Das Lieben bringt groß Freud for SATB choir (Eichstätt: Jubilate, 1985)
- O Lamm Gottes, unschuldig for SATB choir (Eichstätt: Jubilate, 1987)
- Missa in C major for SATB choir (Munich: Opus-Verlag, 1995)
- Missa "In gloria Dei" for SATB choir (Munich: Opus-Verlag, 1995)
- Missa mundi for SATB Choir and organ (Munich: Opus-Verlag, 2002)
- Missa in memoriam Theobald Schrems for four-part male choir (2008, unpublished)

== Editor ==
- Franz Xaver Schnizer: Six Sonatas op. 1 for harpsichord (piano) or organ (Stuttgart: Carus, 1980)
- Wolfgang Amadeus Mozart: Intrada and Fugue in C major from K. 399 (385i) (Eichstätt: Jubilate, 1994)
- Antonio Vivaldi: Concerto in D major (Munich: Opus-Verlag, 1994)
- Johann Melchior Molter: Concerto Pastorale (Munich: Opus-Verlag, 1995)
- John Stanley: Concerto in D major (Munich: Opus-Verlag, 1996)
- John Stanley: Concerto in A major (Munich: Opus-Verlag, 1999)
- John Stanley: Concerto I in E major (Munich: Opus-Verlag, 1999)
- John Stanley: Concerto III in B major (Munich: Opus-Verlag, 2000)
- John Stanley: Concerto VI in C major (Munich: Opus-Verlag, 2000)
- Harald Genzmer: Concerto for organ (Munich: Schott, 2002)
- Harald Genzmer: Sinfonisches Konzert no. 2 for organ (Mainz: Schott, 2003)
- Giuseppe Tartini: Eleven slow Sonata movements (Munich: Opus-Verlag, 2011)
- Joseph Rupert Ignaz Bieling: Concerto in B major and three Sonatas (Munich: Opus-Verlag, 2015)
- George Frideric Handel: Concerto in G minor (Munich: Opus-Verlag, 2015)

== Bibliography ==
- Dux et comes. Festschrift für Franz Lehrndorfer zum 70. Geburtstag (book and CD), edited by Hans D. Hoffert and Klemens Schnorr. Regensburg: Universitätsverlag Regensburg, 1998. ISBN 3-930480-68-9.
