= Edgar Krapp =

German organist (born 1947)

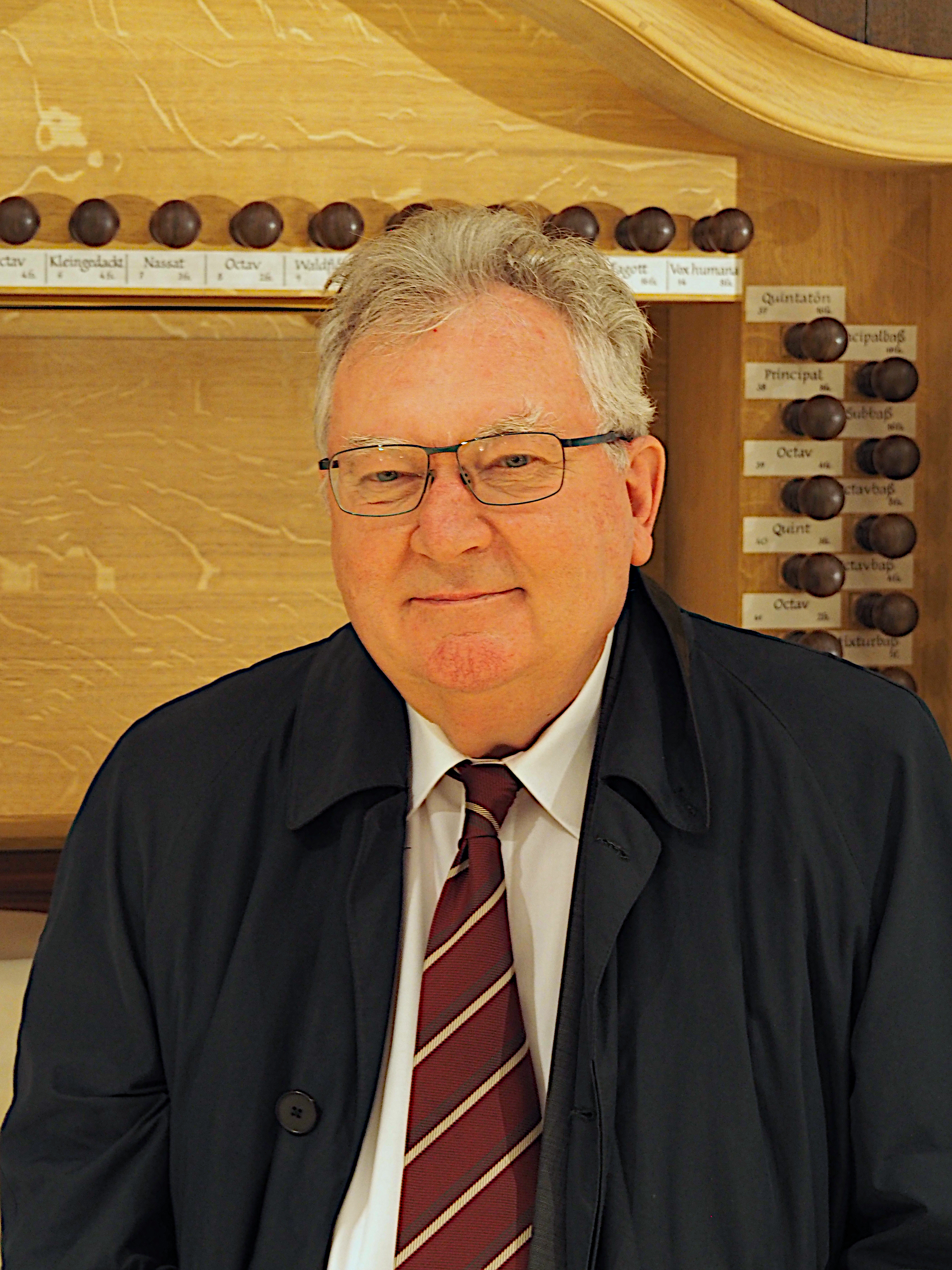
- Krapp in 2020
- Born: 3 June 1947 (age 79); Bamberg, Bavaria, Germany
- Occupations: Organist; Academic teacher
- Organizations: Hochschule für Musik und Theater München; Neue Bachgesellschaft

Edgar Krapp (born 3 June 1947) is a German organist and music professor. Krapp is a member of the Board of the Neue Bachgesellschaft (New Bach Society) in Leipzig and the Bavarian Academy of Fine Arts.

== Biography ==
Krapp was born in Bamberg on 3 June 1947. His first organ lessons were as a member of the cathedral choir. After graduation he studied organ with Franz Lehrndorfer in Munich and with Marie-Claire Alain in Paris. During his studies he won many prizes at international music competitions.

From 1974 to 1993 he served as the successor of Helmut Walcha at the Music Academy in Frankfurt and from 1982 to 1991 he taught as a visiting professor at the Salzburg Mozarteum. In 1993 he was appointed as successor to Franz Lehrndorfer at the Hochschule für Musik und Theater München, where he taught until 2012. His successor since this time is Bernhard Haas.

Krapp has performed throughout Europe, America and Japan as a concert organist and was worked with renowned conductors such as Rafael Kubelík, Georges Prêtre, Colin Davis, Lorin Maazel, Vladimir Fedoseyev, Horst Stein and Christoph Eschenbach. He played Bach's complete organ oeuvre several times. All 14 concerts of it in Munich were broadcast live. He also played and recorded organ concertos by Handel and his entire harpsichord works. In 1985 he performed Handel's Organ Concertos Op. 4 with the Stuttgart Radio Symphony Orchestra in collaboration with South German Radio.

He has played with the Chicago Symphony Orchestra, the Bavarian Radio Symphony Orchestra, Munich Philharmonic, the Bamberg Symphony, Deutsches Symphonie-Orchester Berlin and the Vienna Symphony Orchestra. In 1995 he played with the Netherlands Chamber Choir in Berlin Cathedral. In 1983 he played the organ in the basilica at Kloster Benediktbeuern, "Old Italian Church Sonatas for 'Cello and Organ", with David Geringas.
