= Georg Ratzinger (politician) =

German politician (1844–1899)

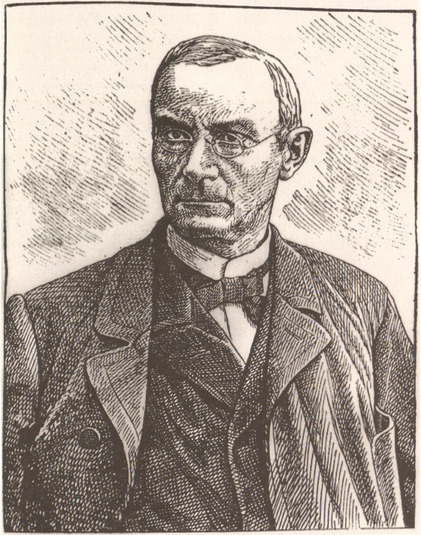

Member of the Reichstag
- In office 6 December 1898 – 3 December 1899
- Preceded by: Franz Xaver Leonhard
- Succeeded by: Conrad von Preysing
- Constituency: Lower Bavaria 5 (Deggendorf)
- In office 22 February 1877 – 9 September 1878
- Preceded by: Franz Seraphim Köllerer
- Succeeded by: Gregor Fichtner
- Constituency: Upper Bavaria 7 (Rosenheim)

Member of the Landtag of Bavaria
- In office 28 September 1893 – 3 December 1899
- Preceded by: Josef Hennemann
- Succeeded by: Joseph Huber
- Constituency: Regen
- In office 28 September 1875 – 6 November 1877
- Succeeded by: Michael Feurstein
- Constituency: Munich

Personal details
- Born: 3 April 1844 Rickering, Kingdom of Bavaria
- Died: 3 December 1899 (aged 55) Munich, Kingdom of Bavaria, German Empire
- Party: BPP/Centre (c. 1870s–1890s); BB (1893–1899)
- Relatives: Georg Ratzinger (grandnephew); Benedict XVI (grandnephew)
- Education: LMU Munich (DTheol)
- Occupation: Priest; politician; author
- Church: Catholic (Latin Church)

Orders
- Ordination: 1867

Georg Ratzinger (3 April 1844 – 3 December 1899) was a German Catholic priest, political economist, social reformer, author and politician. He saw the gospel and Catholic social teaching as a means of empowering the poor.

Ratzinger was a pupil at the gymnasium at Passau during the years 1855–63, studied theology at Munich, 1863–67, and was ordained priest in 1867. In 1868 he received the degree of Doctor of Theology at Munich. During the following years he devoted himself partly to pastoral, partly to journalistic work. In 1869 he was chaplain at Berchtesgaden; 1870–71 he was editor of the journal "Fränkisches Volksblatt" at Würzburg; 1872–74, chaplain at Landshut, then editor, until 1876, of the "Volksfreund", at Munich.

He was a member of the Parliament of Bavaria from 1875 to 1878 and of the German Reichstag from 1877 to 1878. During this period he belonged to the Centre Party.

With exception of a pastorate of three years at Günzelhafen, 1885–1888, he lived for a number of years at Munich, where he devoted himself to journalism and research.

In 1893 Ratzinger was again elected to the Bavarian Landtag, where he was now a moderate adherent of the Bavarian Peasants' League (Bayerischer Bauernbund), his views of social politics having caused him in the meantime to sever his connections with the Centre Party. In 1898 he was again elected a member of the Reichstag. He remained a member of both bodies until his death.

As a literary man Ratzinger deserves much credit for his scholarly work in political economy and in historical subjects. His chief works, distinguished by erudition, richness of thought, and animated exposition, are: "Geschichte der Armenpflege" (prize essay, Freiburg, 1868, 2nd revised ed., 1884); "Die Volkswirtschaft in ihren sittlichen Grundlagen. Ethnischsociale Studien über Cultur und Civilisation (Freiburg, 1881; 2nd. completely revised ed., 1895).

The later work maintains the ethical principles of Christianity as the only sure basis of political economy and opposes the materialistic system of what is called the "classical political economy" of Adam Smith.

"Forschungen zur bayerischen Geschichte" (Kempten, 1898) contains a large number of studies on early Bavarian history and on the history of civilization, based on a series of unconnected treatises, which had first appeared in the "Historisch-politische Blätter". Of his smaller works the following should be mentioned: "Das Concil und die deustche Wissenschaft" (anonymously issued at Mainz, 1872) appeared first in the "Katholik", 1872, I; "Die Erhaltung des Bauernstandes" (Freiburg, 1883).

His nephew was the police officer Joseph Ratzinger, Sr., father of Pope Benedict XVI and Georg Ratzinger, the priest and church musician.
