= Hofbräuhaus Traunstein =

Beer brewery in Bavaria, Germany

Coordinates: 47.8689686°N 12.6485124°E

- Location: Traunstein, Bavaria, Germany
- Annual production volume: 100,000 hectolitres (85,000 US bbl)
- Revenue: €10 million
- Employees: 27
- Website: hb-ts.de

Hofbräuhaus Traunstein is a beer brewery in Traunstein, southeastern Bavaria, Germany.

== History ==
The Bavarian duke and sovereign elect, Maximilian I, Elector of Bavaria, in response to demand for beer, set up a 'Weißes Bräuhaus' (White Brewery), with completion in 1612. Opened initially with a public bar. The Wittelsbach sovereign Maximilian I who had laid claim to the monopoly on wheat beer, used the brewery in order to balance the budget and repay the burden of debt which had been accrued by way of inheritance from his father. However due to the puritanical nature of Maximilian, he enacted laws against opulent guesthouses and against excessive wine and beer consumption despite the financial benefit that came from the brewery.

Between 1705 and 1851 the brewery was a victim of fire, such as 1704 initially when Pandurs pillaged Traunstein, and in 1851 when arsonists razed the town to the ground, also destroying over 100 houses, the Town Hall, the County Court, the Main Salt Office, the Pension Office, the Church, and several towers (apart from the Upper Tower). The brewery was saved by its workers who extinguished the flames with the very beer it produced.

In 1799 with the death of sovereign elect Karl-Theodor the brewery was passed to his widow, Archduchess Maria Leopoldine of Austria-Este, in the last electoral leadership. Following the secularisation, the new kingdom of Bavaria accrued many ecclesiastical breweries.

In 1806 Frant Reiter from Munich acquired the Traunstein business, along with all rights to brew wheat beer. In 1821 it was then passed on to Joseph Windmassinger from Runding, who acquired it with lawyer Dr. Hutter. As well as wheat beer, the Traunstein began to brew dark brown beer. Up until the death of Windmassinger, they were joint owners of the Traunstein, and after his death in 1840 the member of state parliament Dr. Hutter bequeathed the brewery (the right to service, including brewing rights) to his son Dr. Jur. Alois Hutter, who was also a lawyer. During this time there was a third town fire in 1851, and the Traunstein riot of 1868, when a controlled collection of the Bavarian reservists were detained. After the Austro-Prussian War, the Prussian military forced Bavarian soldiers and reservists to learn Prussian. As a result, they moved with their weaponry into Traunstein and barricaded themselves, resulting in riots and an exchange of fire between the Prussian military and Bavarian soldiers, in which one Gendarme fell victim within the Traunstein. Afterwards as lore goes, the Royal-Bavarian Infantry and reservists became so drunk that they were easily overrun and defeated.

The Hofbräuhaus Traunstein remained in the ownership of the Hutter family up until 1896. Dr. Alois Hutter did not have any offspring, resulting in the taking over of the Traunstein upon the death of Alois in 1896, by Peter Sailer, a brewery owner from Lauingen, and father to three sons and one daughter.

In 1919 during recovery following World War I, the brewery purchased the “Sternbräu” property and the “Bachbrauerei” (Creek brewery) were also acquired.

In 1975, Fritz Sailer, who assumed the position of his late father Josef Sailer in 1934, was then able to expand the business after the end of the Second World War. In 1975 all eight varieties of the beer produced were awarded the highest accolade, gold medals from the Deutsche Landwirtschaftsgesellschaft (German Agriculture Society), a record in the history of the brewery.

In 1982, the Hofbräuhaus Traunstein was also the first brewery in the world to have wheat beer on tap.

In 1994, the Traunstein was one of the first breweries in Bavaria and the country as a whole, to become DIN certified, creating opportunities for the brewery guesthouse, as well as the opening of a "Minibräu" (Mini brewery) in Munich, Cologne, and Berlin.

Between 1997 and 2005 the Hofbräuhaus Traunstein was awarded numerous awards for innovative marketing and communication of event-oriented gastronomy concepts and its direct implementation, amongst others by HMSA Deutschland (Hospitality Sales & Marketing Association). The 'Goldene Bieridee' award from the Association of Bavarian Brewers and the Bavarian Hotel and Guesthouse Association.

In 2009 the Traunstein added the European Beer Gold Star from the Association of Independent Breweries in Bavaria for two beers, HELLES, and Furstentrunk. This was added to its collection of 86 gold and silver medals since 1975.

== Beers ==
=== Light ===
- FürstenTrunk
- Hofbräu-Light
- 1612er Zwickelbier
- Helles.

=== Dark ===
- Fastenbock
- Dunkel

=== Wheat Beer ===
- Wheat beer light
- Gastro Weisse
- Alcohol-free
- Wheat beer
- Wheat beer dark

=== Pilsner ===
- Pilsner
