= Franz Michael Permaneder =

German canon lawyer

Franz Michael Permaneder (born at Traunstein, Bavaria, 12 August 1794; died in Regensburg, 10 October 1862) was a German Catholic canon lawyer and academic.

He studied theology and jurisprudence at Landshut and in 1818 was ordained to the priesthood at Regensburg. In 1834, he was appointed professor of church history and canon law at the "Lyceum" of Freising, and in 1847 joined the theological faculty of the Ludwig-Maximilians-Universität München.

He was contributor to the first edition of the Kirchenlexicon, and also wrote:

- "Handbuch des gemeingültigen katholischen Kirchenrechts mit steter Rücksicht auf Deutschland" (Landshut, 1846);
- "Die kirchliche Baulast" (Munich, 1853);
- "Bibliotheca patristica" (incomplete; Landshut, 1841–44);
- a continuation of the "Annales almae literarum universitatis Ingolstadii" (Munich, 1859).
