= Michael Hesemann =

German historian and author (born 1964)

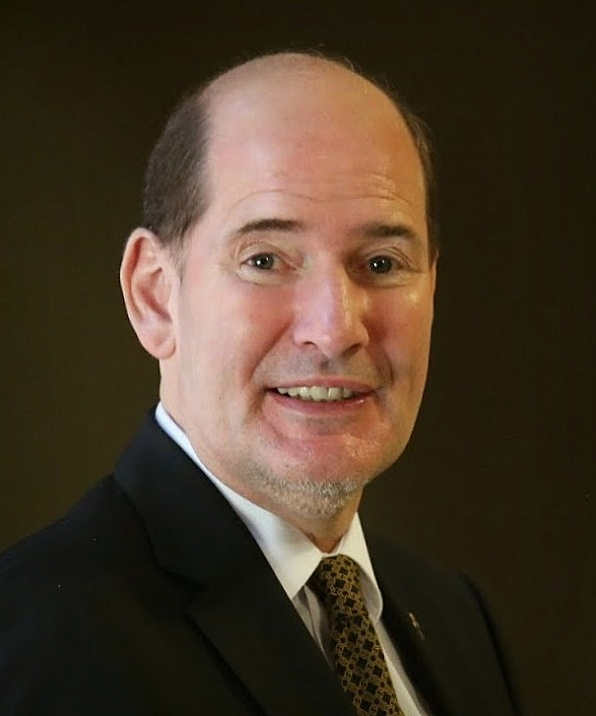
Michael Hesemann

Michael Hesemann (born 22 March 1964 in Düsseldorf) is a German historian, Vatican journalist and author. As a student he became known in Germany as an author of several books on UFOs and extraterrestrial visitors on Earth. Later in his career he turned to topics related to Catholicism, history and archaeology. Hesemann represents decidedly conservative-traditional Roman Catholic views.

== Life ==
When Michael Hesemann was around 14 years old, his father had a UFO sighting that (as Michael Hesemann would recall three decades later) inspired his son to look into the subject. Hesemann studied History and Cultural Anthropology at the University of Göttingen in Germany.

From 1984 to 1990 Hesemann published the German magazine Magazin 2000, which dealt with popular science, paranormal phenomena and religious topics. In 1990, he sold the Magazine and served as its editor-in-chief for the next decade. In 1995, together with his co-editor at Magazin 2000, Hesemann hosted a global ufology congress in Düsseldorf, Germany, where he presented an alleged video of an alien autopsy.

Since 1999, he is accredited to the Holy See Press Office. In 2010, the Wall Street Journal described him as "a religious historian who helps the Vatican date relics". He is German representative of the Pave the Way Foundation (PTWF), for which he did research at the Vatican archives in 2010.

He co-founded Deutschland pro Papa, a conservative Catholic initiative, which claims to represent the "silent majority of Rome-loyal Catholics". In 2013, he compiled an exhibition on the Turin Shroud for the Sovereign Military Order of Malta, touring through Germany and Austria as of 2015.

Together with Georg Ratzinger, Hesemann co-authored "My brother, the Pope".

In 2014, he claimed to have located 2000 pages of documents on the Armenian genocide in the Vatican Archives. For this, in October 2016, he received an honorary doctorate of the National Academy of Sciences of Armenia.

== Vatican ==
In the Vatican, he investigated the history of the alleged relic of the inscription of the cross of Jesus, hidden in Rome for nearly 1700 years. It was dated by seven Israeli experts for comparative palaeography, the established method to date inscriptions, into the 1st century. The relic is exhibited in the Basilica di Santa Croce.

His book The Pope who Defied Hitler. The Truth about Pius XII (2008) led him to claim that pope Pius XII, sometimes referred to as the "Hitler Pope", was in fact responsible for saving hundreds of thousands of Jews. His book The Pope and the Holocaust: Pius XII and the Secret Vatican Archives (2022) makes another defense of the figure of Pius XII drawing from the recently published Vatican Apostolic Archive, arguing that the pope was a shrewd diplomat and a defender of the Jewish people during the Holocaust. Hesemann's defense of Pius XII in The Pope and the Holocaust is critiqued by Tim Parks as contrary to the evidence from the Pope's actions and inactions, and the original documents about them in the Vatican archives. In a follow-up to Parks's review, Hesemann and Parks exchanged comments on the critical issues.

== Court order against Hesemann ==
In January 2013, a court in Hamburg ruled that Hesemann would have to pay a fine up to €250,000 if he continued libelling the German theologian David Berger. According to the ruling Hesemann had falsely affirmed that Berger had been one of the authors of the extreme right-wing Catholic (now closed) web site kreuz.net. Indeed, a different David Berger wrote those articles, Berger claimed. Hesemann challenged the claim.

== Bibliography ==
- Findet der Weltuntergang statt? (Will doomsday happen?), Göttingen 1984
- UFOs: Die Beweise (eine Dokumentation) (UFOs: The proof), Göttingen 1993 ISBN 9783925248009
- UFOs: Die Kontakte (UFOs: The contacts), München 1990, ISBN 3-931652-37-8
- Botschaft aus dem Kosmos. Neuwied 1993, ISBN 3-923781-64-4 / "Cosmic Connections: Worldwide Crop Formations and ET Contacts", Gateway Books 1995, ISBN 978-1858600178
- UFOs: Neue Beweise. Eine Dokumentation. (UFOs: New Evidence), Düsseldorf 1994, ISBN 3-925248-20-X
- Geheimsache UFO: Die wahre Geschichte der unbekannten Flugobjekte, Neuwied 1994, ISBN 3-923781-83-0 / UFOs: The Secret History, Marlowe & Co 1998, ISBN 978-1569247013
- Jenseits von Roswell. UFOs: der Schweigevorhang lüftet sich, Neuwied 1996, ISBN 3-931652-15-7 / Beyond Roswell: The Alien Autopsy Film, Area 51, & the U.S. Government Coverup of Ufos, Marlowe & Co, 1998, ISBN 978-1569247099 (with Philip Mantle)
- "Kornkreise: die Geschichte eines Phänomens" (Crop circles: the history of a phenomenon), Neuwied 1996, ISBN 978-3931652043
- UFOs über Deutschland. Ein praktisches Handbuch (UFOs over Germany. A practical handbook), Niedernhausen 1997, ISBN 3-635-60319-8
- Geheimsache Fatima. Vom Vatikan verschwiegen: Was offenbarte die Gottesmutter über die Zukunft der Menschheit? (Secret affair Fatima. Concealed by the vatican: What did God's mother reveal about the future of mankind?), München 1997, ISBN 3-88498-117-X. / "The Fatima Secret (Whitley Strieber's Hidden Agendas)", Dell 2000, ISBN 978-0440236443
- Die kommende Weltkrise (The Coming World Crisis), 1998
- Die Jesus-Tafel (The Jesus-Title), Freiburg (Herder) 1999
- Die stummen Zeugen von Golgota (Silent Witnesses of Golgota), München (Hugendubel) 2000
- UFOs: Eine Bilddokumentation (UFOs: an illustrated documentation), Köln 2001, ISBN 3-8290-8403-X
- Das Fatima-Geheimnis (The Fatima Secret), 2002
- Die Entdeckung des Heiligen Grals (The Discovery of the Holy Grail), München (Pattloch) 2003
- Der erste Papst (The First Pope), München (Pattloch) 2003
- Hitlers Religion, München (Pattloch) 2004; Augsburg (St. Ulrich) 2012
- Hitlers Lügen (Hitler's Lies), Erfststadt 2005
- Johannes Paul der Große (John Paul the Great), München 2005
- "Stigmata", Güllesheim 2006
- "Die Dunkelmänner" (The Black Legends), Augsburg (St. Ulrich) 2007
- "Paulus von Tarsus“ (St. Paul of Tarsus), Augsburg (St. Ulrich) 2008
- "Der Papst, der Hitler trotzte” (The Pope who Defied Hitler), Augsburg (St. Ulrich) 2008
- "Jesus von Nazareth. Archäologen auf den Spuren des Erloesers", Augsburg (St. Ulrich) 2009
- "Das Bluttuch Christi" (The Blood Cloth of Christ), Munich (Herbig) 2010
- "Auf den Spuren des Grabtuchs von Turin" (In Search for the Turin Shroud), Fulda (Kehl) 2010
- "Maria von Nazareth. Geschichte, Archaeologie, Legenden", Augsburg (St. Ulrich) 2011
- Johannes Paul II. Erbe und Charisma, Augsburg (St. Ulrich) 2011
- with Benedict XVI.: Der Papst in Deutschland, Augsburg (St. Ulrich) 2011
- with Georg Ratzinger: Mein Bruder, der Papst, München (Herbig) 2011; engl. als My Brother, the Pope, San Francisco 2012
- Jesus in Ägypten. Das Geheimnis der Kopten, München (Herbig) 2012
- Papst Franziskus. Das Vermächtnis Benedikts XVI. und die Zukunft der Kirche, München (Herbig) 2013, ISBN 978-3776627244
- Völkermord an den Armeniern (Genocide against the Armenians), München (Herbig) 2015
- Der Papst und der Holocaust: Pius XII und die geheimen Akten im Vatikan, Langen Mueller (Herbig) 2018, ISBN 978-3-7844-3460-5
