= Bernhard Haas =

German organist, music theorist and university teacher

Bernhard Haas (born 1964) is a German organist, music theorist and academic.

== Life ==
Haas studied organ, piano, harpsichord, sacred music, composition and music theory in Cologne, Freiburg and Vienna. He won several international prizes at organ competitions, such as the Bach-Wettbewerb in Wiesbaden 1983 and the Liszt-Wettbewerb in Budapest in 1988.

From 1989 to 1995 he taught organ and organ-improvisation at the music school in Saarbrücken. In 1994 he became an organ professor at the Staatliche Hochschule für Musik und Darstellende Kunst Stuttgart. In 2012/13 he moved to the Hochschule für Musik und Theater München to succeed Edgar Krapp.

He has been toured in Europe as well as to the US and Japan. His main interest is music of the 17th and 19th century, contemporary music, Johann Sebastian Bach and Wolfgang Amadeus Mozart. He has also released CDs of adaptations of works by Franz Liszt, Max Reger, Igor Stravinsky, Brian Ferneyhough, Morton Feldman and Iannis Xenakis. As a musicologist, he has written a book on 'new tonality' from Schubert to Webern and a collaboration with Veronica Diederen on the two-part inventions by J. S. Bach.

== Selected discography ==
- Liszt und Stravinsky in Bearbeitungen für Orgel (Arrangements of Liszt and Stravinsky for organ)
  - Franz Liszt: Sonata in B minor, S. 178; Igor Stravinsky: The Rite of Spring. Transcribed for organ by Bernhard Haas.
    - Recorded in 1993 on the Kleuker-Steinmeyer organ in the Tonhalle, Zürich, Switzerland. Audite 20.009. 1 CD.
- Max Reger: Variationen und Fuge op. 73, Introduktion, Passacaglia und Fuge, op. 127
  - Recorded in 1996 on the Rieger organ of the Konzerthaus, Vienna, Austria. Audite 20.020. 1 CD.
- Max Reger: Organ Works Volume 1
  - Ten Pieces, op. 69; Preludes and Fugues op. 85 nos. 1-3.
    - Recorded by Bernhard Haas in 1997 on the Link organ in the Evangelischen Kirche in Giengen an der Brenz, Germany. Naxos 8.553926. 1 CD.
- Ferneyhough, Feldman, Scelsi, Xenakis: Die Orgelwerke (Ferneyhough, Feldman, Scelsi, Xenakis: The Organ Works)
  - Ferneyhough: Seven Stars; Feldman: Principal Sound; Scelsi: In nomine Lucis; Xenakis: Gmeoorh
    - Recorded in 2007 on the Rieger organ of the Essen Cathedral, Germany. Edition Zeitklang 35033. 1 CD.
