= Jeffrey M. Lackner =

American clinical psychologist

- Born: 1961 (age 64–65)
- Education: BA, Political Science, 1984 Diploma, Social Psychology, 1985 MA in General Experimental Psychology, 1987 Psy.D Clinical Psychology, 1992 Pre-doctoral resident, Clinical Psychology Postdoctoral fellow, Behavioral Medicine/pain
- Alma mater: Emory University London School of Economics and Political Science The College of William and Mary Rutgers University University of Texas Medical School in Houston University of Rochester School of Medicine and Dentistry
- Occupations: Clinical psychologist, educator, and researcher
- Spouse: Ann Marie Carosella

Jeffrey M. Lackner (born 1961) is an American clinical psychologist, educator, author, and researcher at the University at Buffalo (UB). He currently serves as a professor at UB's Jacobs School of Medicine and Biomedical Sciences and Division Chief of Behavioral Medicine in the Department of Medicine. He is known for his work conducting research testing brief and scalable treatments for persistent nociplastic pain disorders, understanding how and why they work and the people for whom they are most effective. He approaches the understanding of the etiology, nature and treatment of these disorders from a biopsychosocial perspective with a particular focus on the role of cognitive and behavioral factors and how they interact with biological factors to influence health outcomes.

== Early life and education ==
Lackner was born in Denver, Colorado to a Jewish family and attended Kent Denver Country Day (now Kent Denver School), graduating in 1980. Lackner received a B.A. in political science from Emory University in 1984. At the graduate level, he obtained a diploma in social psychology from the London School of Economics and Political Science in 1985 and a master's degree in general experimental psychology from The College of William & Mary in 1987. In 1992, Lackner earned a doctorate in clinical psychology from Rutgers University where his supervisors included his primary mentor G. Terence Wilson (application of social learning theory to analysis and treatment of clinical problems and their change mechanisms) as well as Arnold Lazarus (CBT), Cyril Franks (dissemination science, behavioral assessment), and Barbara McCrady (evidence-based treatments for alcohol disorders, couples therapy). Doctoral training shaped a commitment to developing more efficient empirically validated treatments by targeting underlying processes that drive symptom change and adopting novel health delivery models that increase access to more people in need than face-to-face format. He was a predoctoral clinical psychology resident at the University of Texas Medical School in Houston where his interest expanded to physical health disorders (e.g., persistent pain) with strong behavioral underpinnings. In 1994, Lackner completed a post-doctoral fellowship in behavioral medicine/pain at the University of Rochester School of Medicine under the guidance of Michael Feuerstein.

== Career ==
In 1994, Lackner joined the faculty of the University of Buffalo where he founded the UB Behavioral Medicine Clinic in the medical school’s department of anesthesiology. The clinic was originally conceived as a resource where patients from the community could receive protocol-driven treatments validated in research settings that were not otherwise available. After moving to the department of medicine, he was promoted to the rank of associate professor with tenure in 2009. In 2015, he was promoted to Full Professor and in 2018 became the inaugural Chief of the Division of Behavioral Medicine in the Department of Medicine. In 2024, he was promoted to SUNY Distinguished Professor in Medicine. Between 2015 and 2024, he served as Vice Chair of Research in UB’s department of medicine.

== Scientific research ==
Lackner's program of research focuses on developing and testing novel, brief, and effective treatments for chronic pain disorders, understanding the "active ingredients" that explain why, how, and when they work, identifying patients for whom they are most effective, and their "real-world" value (e.g., economic cost). Recognizing the need to increase access to and utilization of evidence-based treatments for common pain disorders for which there are no satisfactory medical cures, Lackner developed a low-intensity version of CBT (cognitive behavioral therapy) for IBS that required 60% less clinician support than full CBT interventions that relied on highly trained clinicians of which there are relatively few to meet need. Positive results supported a clinical trial called the Irritable Bowel Syndrome Outcome Study (IBSOS), led by Lackner at the University at Buffalo in collaboration with the Northwestern University Feinberg School of Medicine Gastroenterology Division and the National Institute of Diabetes and Digestive and Kidney Diseases. The IBSOS trial showed that the low intensity, home based version of CBT (4 sessions) was as effective as a high-intensity, clinic based treatment (10 sessions) in improving GI symptoms and more effective than an active comparator that controlled for the generic benefits of simply participating in treatment. The IBSOS qualifies as a landmark clinical trial because its findings have had a significant practice-changing impact on the understanding and care of IBS as evidenced by changes in clinical practice guidelines recommending CBT. The strategies (e.g., flexible problem solving, worry control) of CBT developed and validated by Lackner and his team in two NIH trials are regarded as core components of behavioral interventions for disorders of gut-brain interaction (formerly functional GI disorders) according to an international interdisciplinary team of experts of the Rome Foundation.

With a response rate of approximately 60%, the behavioral treatment Lackner developed is considered one of the most effective IBS therapies for IBS with an efficacy profile for global IBS symptom relief that compares favorably to FDA-approved medications relief of (ranging from 14 to 40%). Lackner converted the clinical materials of his research into an award winning trade book, Controlling IBS the drug-free way: A 10-step plan for symptom relief. Lackner’s research establishing the enduring (12 month) benefit of CBT after treatment ended was identified by the University of Oslo and MAGIC (Making GRADE the Irresistible Choice) Foundation as one of 17 papers published in 2018 in first tier internal medicine journals as having "practice changing potential".

Recognizing that patients vary substantially in their response to treatment, Lackner collaborated with Jim Jaccard (NYU) on filling a knowledge gap on understanding theory-driven (e.g. changes in how people process information, learned skills) and nonspecific (e.g., having personal contact and a supportive relationship with a clinician, expecting improvement from a credible treatment, feeling hopeful and optimistic by starting treatment) processes that explain how CBT for pain promotes symptom relief and patients who are most likely to benefit. Lackner found that CBT induced improvement in GI symptoms by teaching self-management skills that strengthened self-efficacy in a therapeutic environment where clinician and patient agree on tasks. This study challenged conventional wisdom that the emotional bond between therapist and patient was fundamental to symptom relief. Lackner and Jaccard's researchers echo depression researchers in showing that the therapeutic bond may be more consequential to symptom change than a cause and secondary to task agreement.

Lackner was the first pain researcher to use neuroimaging techniques to characterize prospectively the neural mechanisms underlying symptom changes in CBT-treated patients (PET study). Lackner built on this research in a collaborative study with Emeran Mayer showing that CBT for IBS can alter gut microbiome and brain activity in IBS patients. Patients who responded to CBT with less severe symptoms had a distinct microbiome profile than non-responders. Responders also demonstrated more changes in functional and structural connectivity in the brain than non-responders. By linking the efficacy of CBT to changes in key components in the patient’s brain and gut microbiota, data suggested that CBT induces IBS symptom relief by normalizing the bidirectional communication network connecting the central nervous system and the gastrointestinal tract (i.e. brain-gut connection). This line of research was the first time the microbiome was implicated as a biological mechanism for explaining how a psychological treatment like CBT works to relieve symptoms of any kind.

Lackner’s research on behavioral pain treatments has been primarily supported through grants from the NIDDK of the National Institutes of Health. He has authored more than 150 publications dealing with behavioral treatments for pain, its impacts, and vulnerability processes involved in their maintenance and onset.

Current research focuses on testing the benefit of a brief behavioral treatment for chronic pelvic pain as part of the Easing Pelvic Pain Interventions Clinical (EPPIC) Research Program in collaboration with Quentin Clemens (University of Michigan), James Jaccard (NYU) and Bruce Naliboff (UCLA). Lackner has mentored over 80 medical students, residents, fellows, graduate, undergraduate and high school students.

== Awards ==
Lackner is a Fellow of the Society of Behavioral Medicine, the American Psychological Association (Society of Health Psychology), Association for Psychological Science, American Gastroenterological Association, and the Academy of Behavioral Medicine Research. In 2009, he received the Peterson Prize from Rutgers University for "outstanding contributions to Professional Psychology".
