= Theobald Schrems =

German priest and director of music (1893-1963)

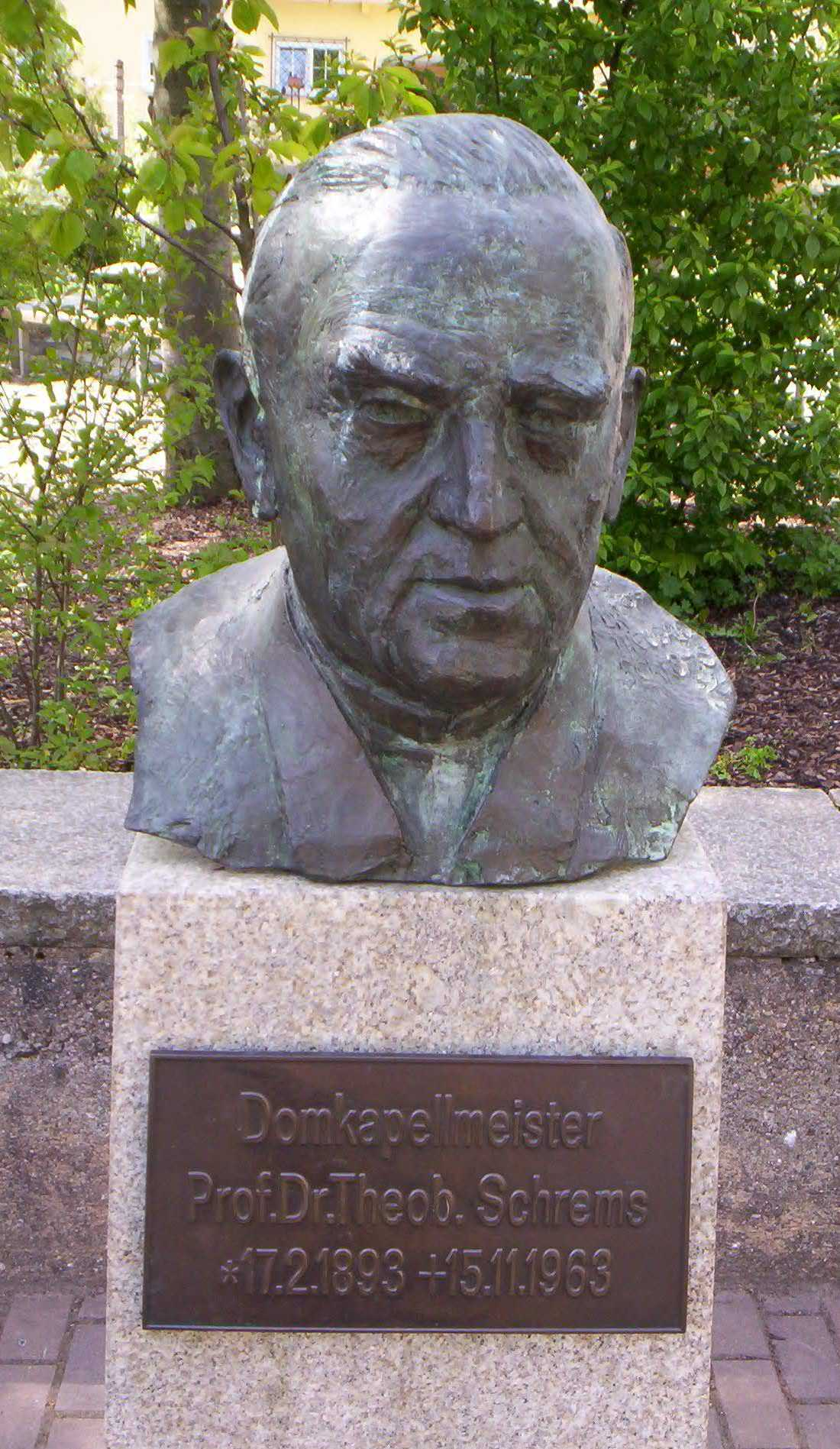
Theobald Schrems

Theobald Schrems (17 February 1893 – 15 November 1963) was the founder of the Musikgymnasium der Regensburger Domspatzen, a musical gymnasium for the boys' choir Regensburger Domspatzen at the Regensburg Cathedral.

== Career ==
Schrems was born in Mitterteich. After his studies, he was ordained a priest in June 1917. From 1924 until his death in 1963, he was director of music at the Regensburg Cathedral, gaining worldwide acclaim under him. He studied for his state examination for school and church music with Carl Thiel from 1925 to 1928.

He was instrumental in creating of a new organisational structure for the boys with high school, boarding school and choir united under one roof. Under his leadership the choir achieved the fame it still enjoys today. He also worked with the Bavarian Radio Symphony in the early 1960s.

In 1963, Schrems was made an honorary citizen of Regensburg. He was awarded the Bavarian Order of Merit in 1959. Streets in Regensburg and Mitterteich are named after him, in Mitterteich also a school, which houses a bust of him.

Franz Lehrndorfer, who had worked under Schrems, composed in his honour a Mass for four-part male choir. The premiere took place in the cathedral on 9 November 2008 by a choir of former members of the Domspatzen.
