= Roland Büchner =

German church musician and conductor

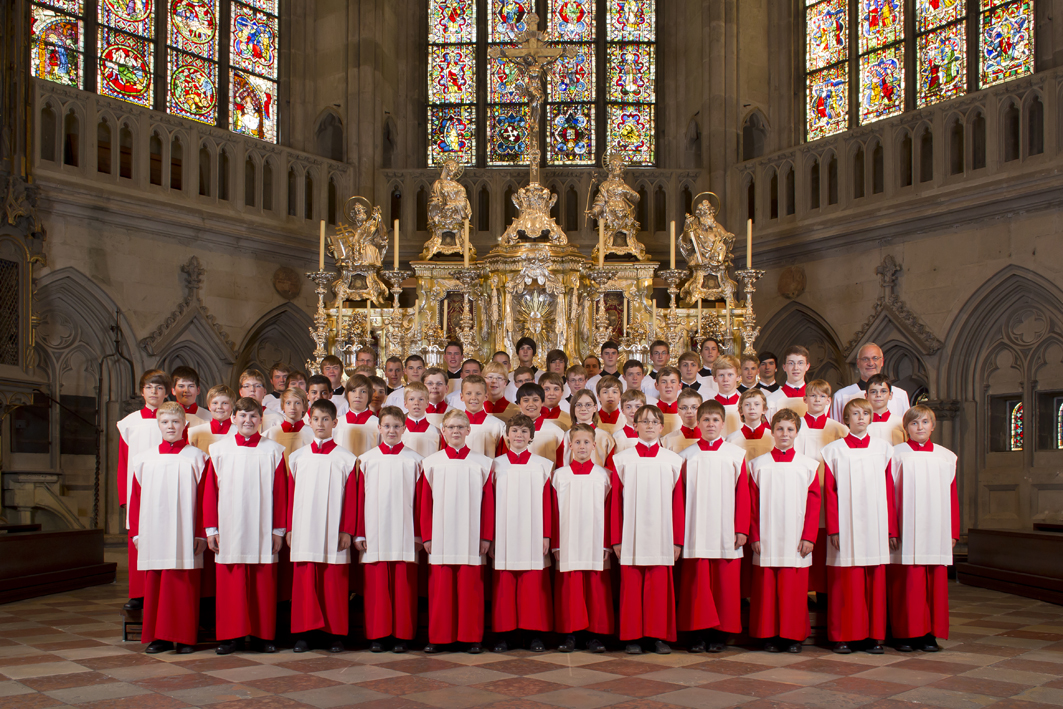
- Büchner (right) with the Regensburger Domspatzen at the Regensburg Cathedral
- Born: 16 February 1954 (age 71); Berlin
- Education: Fachakademie für Katholische Kirchenmusik und Musikerziehung
- Occupation: Choral conductor
- Organizations: Regensburger Domspatzen

Roland Büchner (born 16 February 1954) is a German church musician and conductor. He has been the director (Domkapellmeister) at the Regensburg Cathedral, conducting the boys' choir Regensburger Domspatzen.

== Career ==
Born in Karlstadt, Büchner studied at the Fachakademie für Katholische Kirchenmusik und Musikerziehung in Regensburg and at the Hochschule für Musik und Theater München, with Diethard Hellmann, Godehard Joppich, Franz Lehrndorfer and Gerhard Weinberger among others.

He has been from 1994 Domkapellmeister at the Regensburg Cathedral, succeeding Georg Ratzinger. The boys' choir Regensburger Domspatzen (literally: Regensburg Cathedral Sparrows) performs in the liturgy at the cathedral every Sunday during school time, and in concert internationally. Büchner was appointed honorary professor in Regensburg in 2009.
