= Roberto Garcia Lachner =

American open water swimmer and triathlete (born 1977)

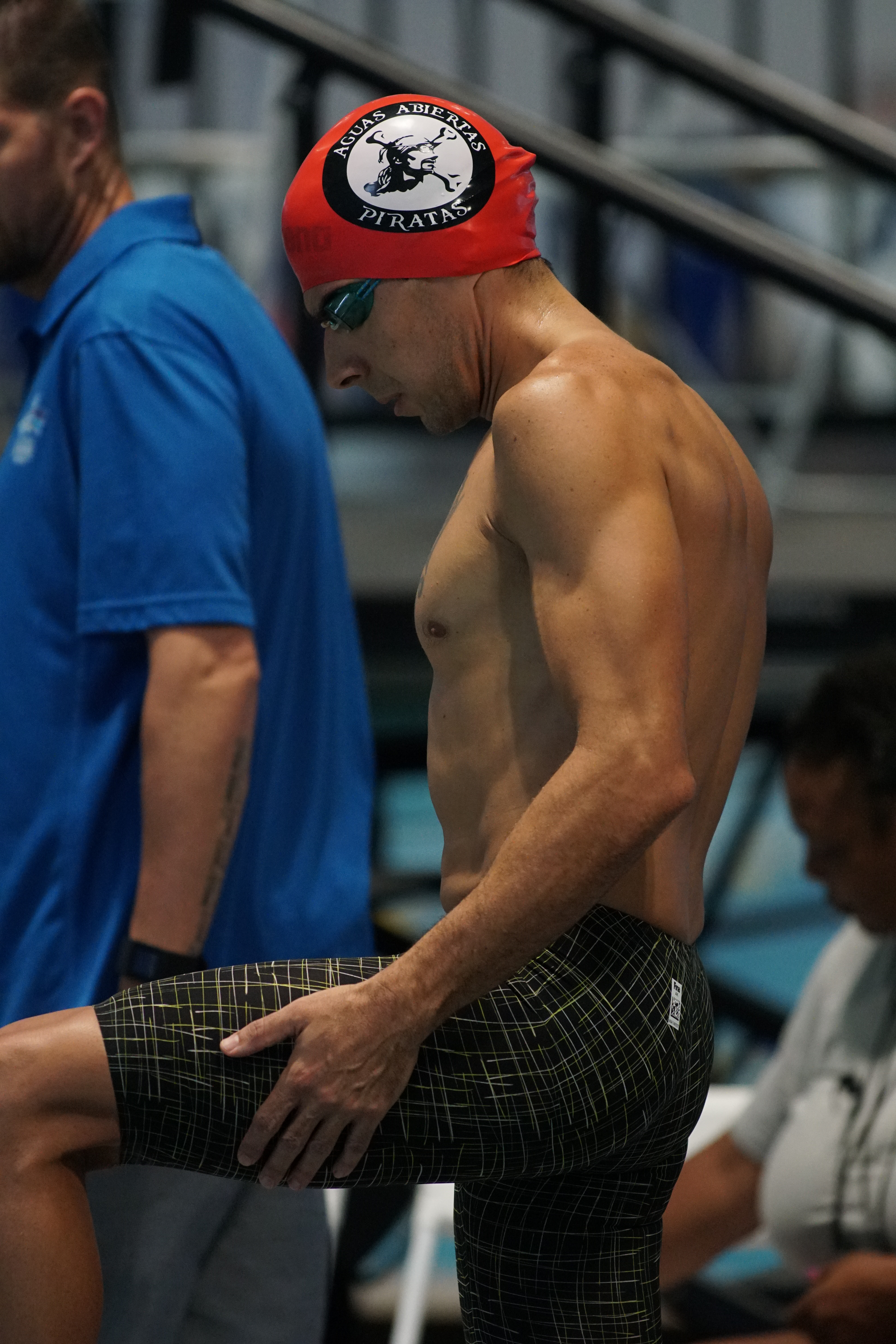

Personal information
- Full name: Roberto Garcia Lachner
- Nickname: Bob
- Born: January 2, 1977 (age 49) Mason City, Iowa, U.S.
- Height: 5 ft 10 in (1.79 m)
- Weight: 154 lb (70 kg)

Sport
- Sport: Swimming
- Strokes: Freestyle

Roberto Garcia Lachner (born January 2, 1977) is an American masters open water swimmer and triathlete. He has won age-group titles at U.S. Masters Swimming (USMS) Marathon Distance Open Water National Championships and Pan American masters open water competitions.

As a youth swimmer, Garcia trained under Michael Lohberg at the Coral Springs Aquatic & Sports Complex in Coral Springs, Florida. Lohberg coached swimmers who competed at six consecutive Olympic Games between 1984 and 2008, including Olympic medalists Dara Torres, Anne Poleska, and Wladislaw Poljakow. Garcia was recognized by Florida Gold Coast Swimming as a Top 10 Age Group Swimmer in 1988 and 1989.

== Training and background ==
Profiles published by the World Open Water Swimming Association and VASA Trainer described Garcia as a masters swimmer and endurance athlete who incorporated VASA Ergometer training into his preparation for open water competition, using dryland swim-specific workouts to develop strength, endurance, and stroke technique.

== Major open water swimming results ==
Date	Event	Location	Distance	Result	Source
April 22, 2017	USMS Marathon Distance Open Water Nationals	Sarasota, Florida (United States)	7 miles	1st Male 40–44	
August 5, 2018	UANA Pan American Open Water Championships	Daytona Beach, Florida (United States)	5 km	1st Male 40–44	
November 6, 2022	Circuito de Aguas Abiertas UIA	Papagayo, Costa Rica	5 km	1st Overall	
September 17, 2023	USMS Long Distance Open Water Nationals	Lake Mission Viejo, California (United States)	5 km	1st Male 45–49	
July 26, 2024	PanAm Aquatics Masters Open Water Championships	Chaguanas, Trinidad and Tobago	3 km	2nd Male 45–49	
July 27, 2025	Circuito de Aguas Abiertas BAC	Lago Arenal, Costa Rica	5 km	1st Overall	
August 23, 2025	XTERRA	Catalinas, Guanacaste, Costa Rica	3,200 m	2nd Overall	
November 8, 2025	The Open Sea	Punta Leona, Costa Rica	3 km	1st Overall	
December 15, 2025	OCEANMAN	Guanacaste, Costa Rica	10 km	2nd Overall	
