= Emeran Mayer =

German gastroenterologist (born 1950)

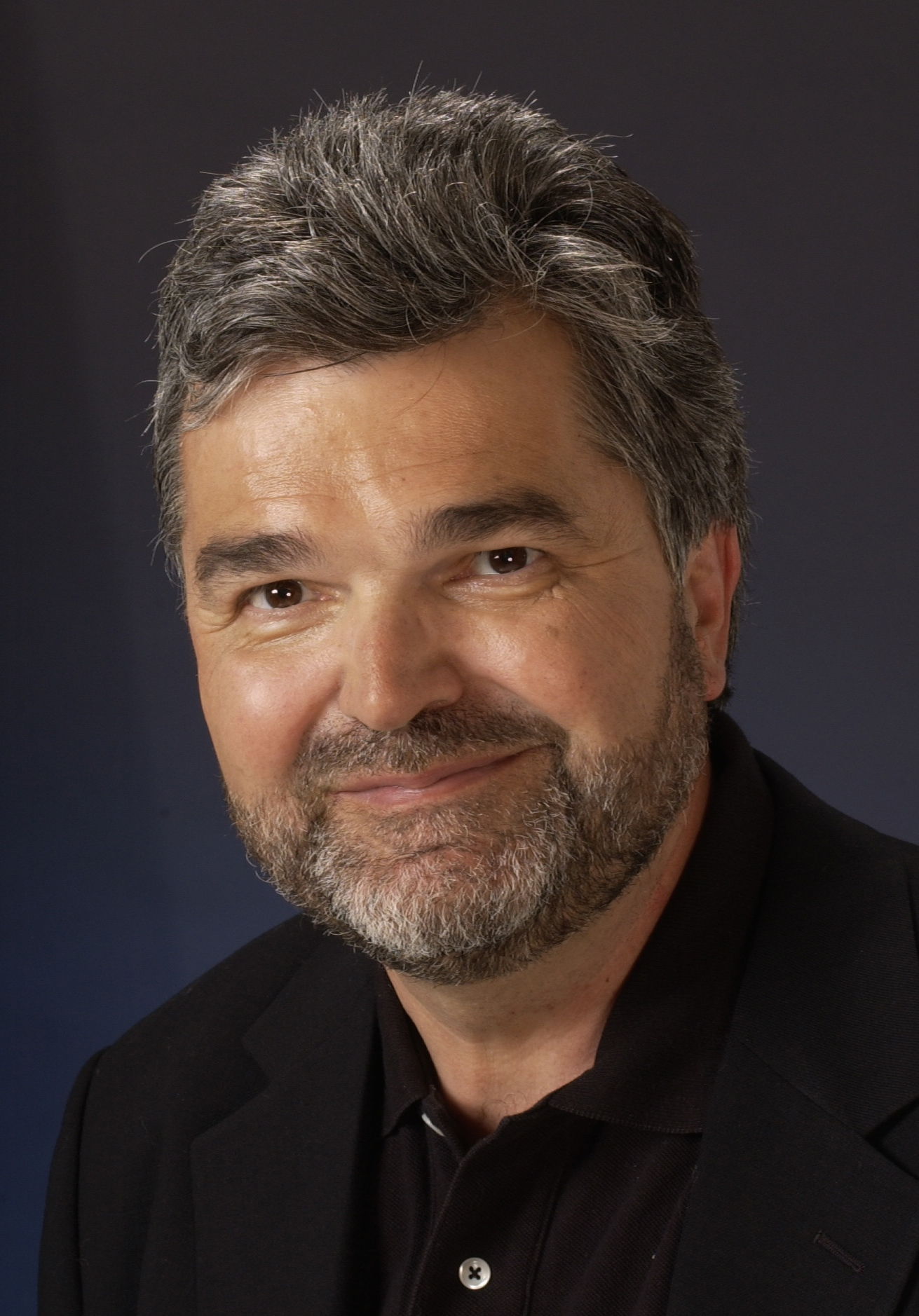
- Born: 26 July 1950 (age 76); Traunstein, West Germany
- Scientific career
- Fields: Gastroenterology
- Workplaces: David Geffen School of Medicine at UCLA
- Website: emeranmayer.com

Emeran Anton Mayer (born July 26, 1950, in Traunstein, West Germany) is a gastroenterologist, lecturer, author, editor, neuroscientist, documentary filmmaker and a professor in the Departments of Medicine, Physiology and Psychiatry at the David Geffen School of Medicine at UCLA. He is a pioneer of medical research into brain-gut interactions

== Early years ==
Mayer became interested in mind–brain–body interactions in health and chronic disease as a college student at LMU Munich, which inspired his decision to go to medical school at LMU Munich's Medical School. His interest in documentary filmmaking galvanized this fascination and resulted in his journeys to the Yanomami tribes in the Orinoco region and the Asmat people in Irian Jaya. There, he filmed and studied native healers while exploring his suspicion that the interactions between the gut and the brain transcend culture and time.

== Career ==
Mayer's research career began at the Institute of Physiology in Munich, with a dissertation on the mechanisms by which the brain affects coronary blood flow in the heart during psychological stress. After moving to the US, he completed his specialty training as a gastroenterologist at UCLA and from then on focused his work on basic, translational, and clinical aspects of brain-gut interactions. He has 40 years of experience studying clinical and neurobiological aspects of how the digestive and nervous systems interact in health and disease. In the United States, Mayer's research has continuously been funded by federal grants from National Institutes of Health (NIH) grants. Currently, Mayer is co-principal investigator, with Dr. Arpana Church, of a five-year, $9.5 million NIH-supported study of polyphenol intake, cognition and the brain-gut microbiome system in older adults at higher risk of Alzheimer's disease. He is co-principal investigator of UCLA's Specialized Center of Research Excellence (SCORE) on sex differences in brain-gut microbiome interactions in irritable bowel syndrome (IBS).

Mayer is a Distinguished Research Professor at UCLA, executive director of the G. Oppenheimer Center for Neurobiology of Stress and Resilience and founding director of the Goodman-Luskin Microbiome Center. The microbiome center launched with a $20 million gift from the Goodman and Luskin families. As of October 2026, Google Scholar lists 450 peer reviewed publications and 76,000 citations to his work, and an h-index of 138. He has co-edited 3 scientific books and published 4 books for the lay public (The Mind Gut Connection in 2016, The Mind Gut Immune Connection in 2018, Interconnected Plates in 2023, and The Mayer Model in 2026). He is the recipient of the 2016 Paul D. MacLean Award for Outstanding Neuroscience Research in Psychosomatic Medicine from the American Psychosomatic Society and the 2017 Ismar Boas Medal from the German Society of Gastroenterology and Metabolic Disease. He has also received the Distinguished Mentor Award of the American Gastroenterological Association and was named a Clarivate Highly Cited Researcher in 2024.

In addition to his longstanding research into the pathophysiology of irritable bowel syndrome, Mayer has been involved in research about the role of brain gut microbiome interaction in Alzheimer's disease, Parkinson's disease, food addiction, obesity, ulcerative colitis, and Crohn's disease. His research efforts into these brain-gut diseases have been closely linked to his strong belief in the One Health concept, which closely links individual health, with health of the gut microbiome, soil microbiome, and health of the planet.

Mayer has a longstanding interest in ancient healing traditions. He has personally practiced different mind-based strategies, including Zen meditation, Ericksonian hypnosis, and autogenic training. His treatment approach to patients is based on a systems biology concept of the close bidirectional interactions between the mind, brain, body and environment.

== Books ==
- Basic And Clinical Aspects Of Chronic Abdominal Pain New York: Elsevier, 1993. ISBN 978-0444894373
- The Biological Basis Of Mind Body Interactions Progress in Brain Research, Vol. 122, Amsterdam: Elsevier, 2000.
- Functional Chronic Pain Syndromes: Similarities And Differences In Clinical Presentation And Pathophysiology Seattle, IASP Press, 2009
- The Mind-Gut Connection: How the Astonishing Dialogue Taking Place in Our Bodies Impacts Health, Weight, and Mood HarperCollins, 2016.
- The Mind-Gut-Immune Connection: Understanding How Food Impacts Our Mind, Our Microbiome, and Our Immunity. With Nell Casey. New York: Harper Wave, 2023. ISBN 978-0-06-301479-4. Hardcover first published in 2021 as The Gut-Immune Connection
- Interconnected Plates: A Mediterranean-Inspired Gut Healthy Cookbook, 2023
- The Mayer Model: Optimize Your Health and Wellness with The Brain Gut Connection, 2026
- The 10th Anniversary Edition of the Mind-Gut-Connection- Coming Soon 2026

== Selected Publications ==
- Mayer EA, Tillisch K, Gupta A (2015). "Gut/brain axis and the microbiota". Journal of Clinical Investigation. 125 (3): 926–938. doi:10.1172/JCI76304. PMID 25689247
- Drossman DA, Camilleri M, Mayer EA, Whitehead WE (2002). "AGA technical review on irritable bowel syndrome". Gastroenterology. 123 (6): 2108–2131. doi:10.1053/gast.2002.37095. PMID 12454866.
- Martin CR, Osadchiy V, Kalani A, Mayer EA (2018). "The Brain-Gut-Microbiome Axis". Cellular and Molecular Gastroenterology and Hepatology. 6 (2): 133–148. doi:10.1016/j.jcmgh.2018.04.003. PMID 30023410.
- Firth J, Gangwisch JE, Borsini A, Wootton RE, Mayer EA (2020). "Food and mood: how do diet and nutrition affect mental wellbeing?". BMJ. 369: m2382. doi:10.1136/bmj.m2382. PMID 32601102.
- Margolis KG, Cryan JF, Mayer EA (2021). "The Microbiota-Gut-Brain Axis: From Motility to Mood". Gastroenterology. 160 (5): 1486–1501. doi:10.1053/j.gastro.2020.10.066. PMID 33493503.
- Mayer EA, Nance K, Chen S (2022). "The Gut-Brain Axis". Annual Review of Medicine. 73: 439–453. doi:10.1146/annurev-med-042320-014032. PMID 34669431.

== Movies ==
- In Search of Balance, 2018. Associate Producer
- Interconnected Planet, 2021. Producer and Co-Director
- The Brain-Gut Connection with Dr. Emeran Mayer, PBS, 2023. Presenter

== Personal life ==
Mayer lives in Topanga, California. He is married to Minou Mayer and has one son, E. Dylan Mayer.
