= Traunstein =

- Town
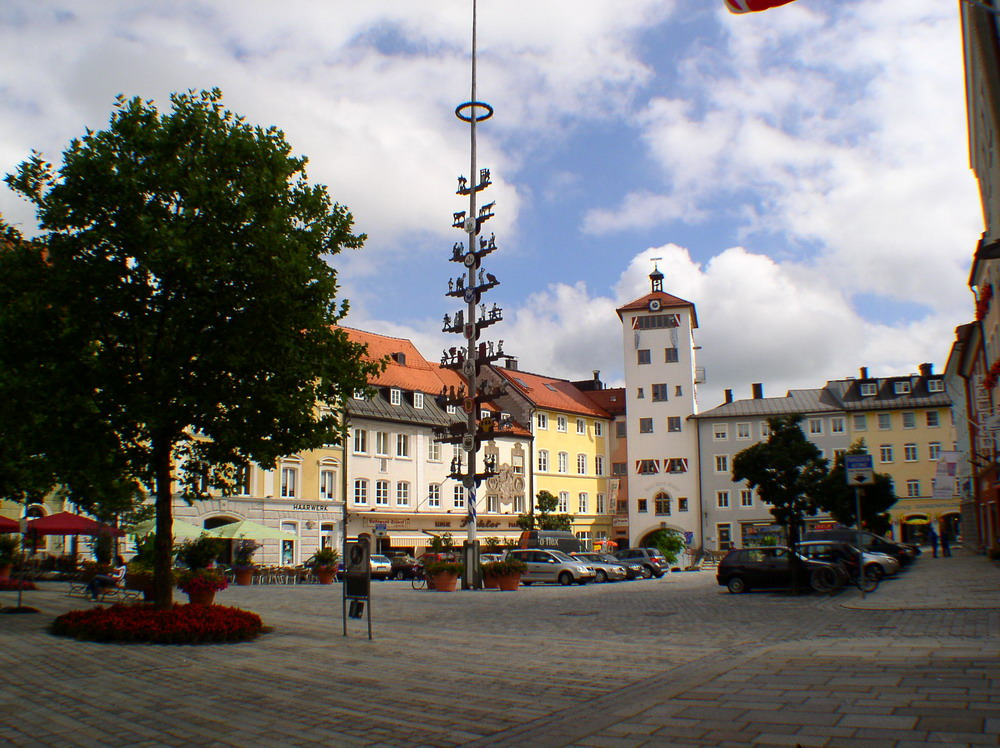
- Market square

- Coat of arms

- Location of Traunstein within Traunstein district
- Interactive map of Traunstein
- Location within Germany Location within Bavaria
- Coordinates: 47°52′N 12°38′E
- Country: Germany
- State: Bavaria
- Admin. region: Oberbayern
- District: Traunstein

Government
  - Mayor (2020–26): Christian Hümmer (CSU)

Area
  - Total: 48.57 km^{2} (18.75 sq mi)
- Elevation: 591 m (1,939 ft)

Population (2025-12-31)
  - Total: 20,977
  - Density: 431.9/km^{2} (1,119/sq mi)
- Time zone: UTC+01:00 (CET)
  - Summer (DST): UTC+02:00 (CEST)
- Postal codes: 83278
- Dialling codes: 0861
- Vehicle registration: TS
- Website: www.traunstein.de

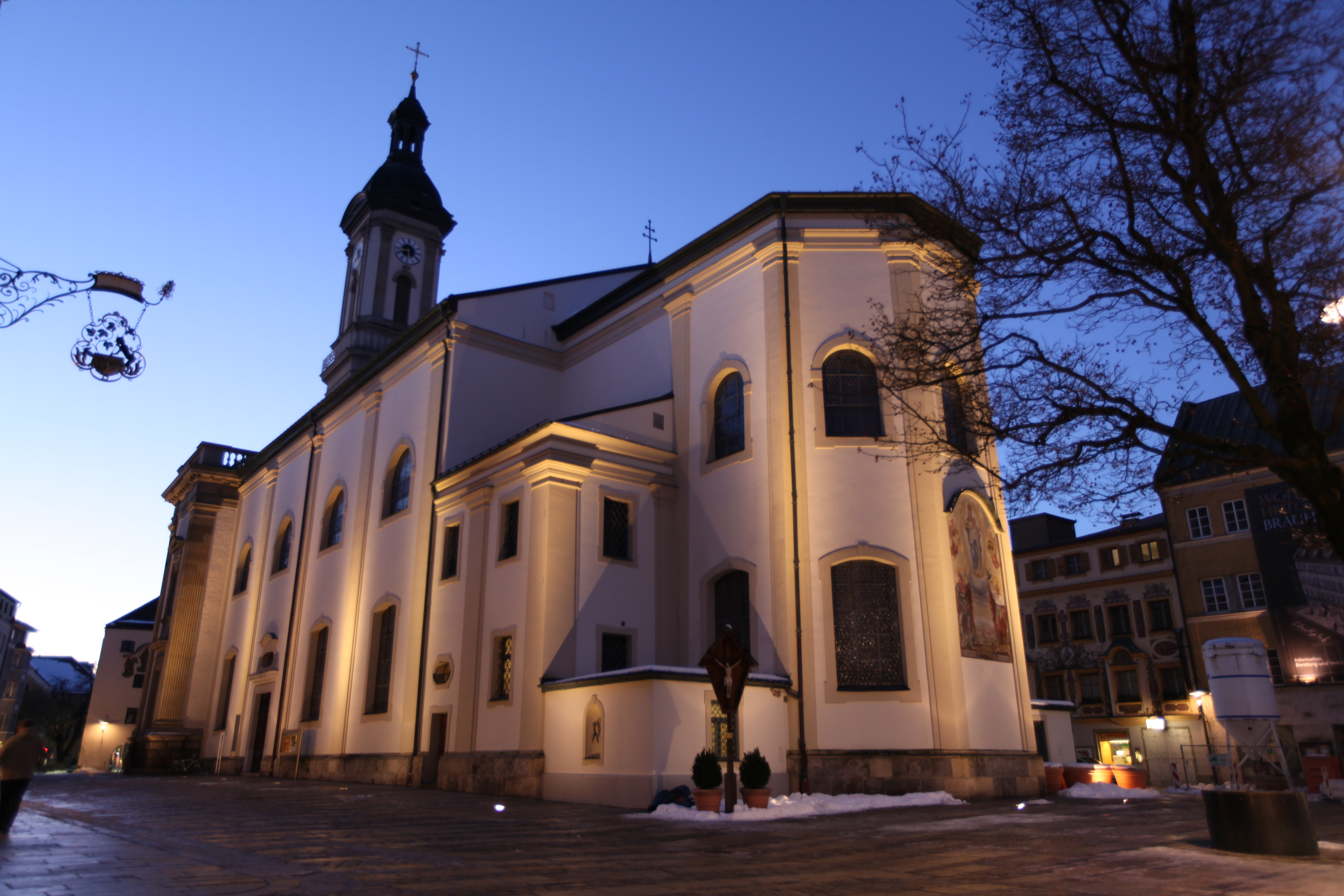
St. Oswald's Church, Market Square, Traunstein (It was home to a pectoral cross worn by Pope Benedict XVI until it was stolen in June of 2023.)

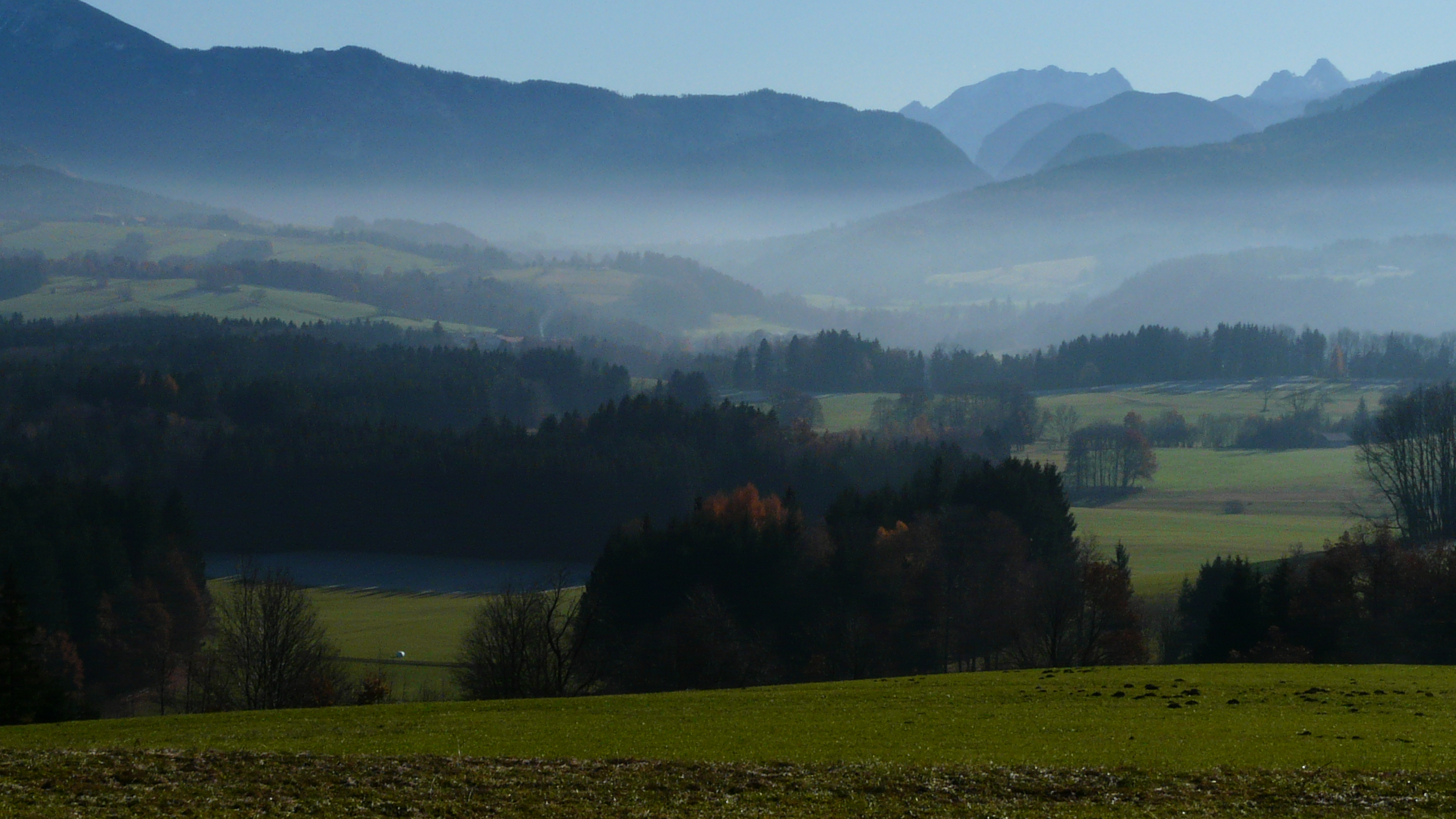
View south towards the Alps from the Hochberg, Traunstein

Traunstein (German pronunciation: [ˈtʁaʊnʃtaɪn]; Central Bavarian: Traunstoa) is a town in the south-eastern part of Bavaria, Germany, and is the administrative center of a much larger district of the same name. The town serves as a local government, retail, health services, transport, and educational center for the wider district.

The historic market square, Bavarian hospitality, local breweries, outdoor sports facilities, Easter Monday horse parade, and connections with Pope Benedict XVI, contribute to the town's profile as a tourist destination.

== Geography ==
The town is situated at the heart of a region called Chiemgau, approximately 11 kilometres (7 miles) east of the Chiemsee between Munich and Salzburg, 15 km (9 1/2 mi) north of the Alps, and 30 km (20 mi) west of Salzburg.

== History ==
=== Early history ===
Although as early as 790 the church records list possessions "ad Trun" and some medieval defence constructions are known to have existed in the surroundings since the 10th century, Trauwenstein itself was first mentioned in a manuscript of the Baumburg monastery in the year 1245. The name means "castle on the Traun", and the domicile of the Lord of "de Truna", surrounded by a little settlement, was probably located there.

The Wittelsbachs (a German/Bavarian dynastic and European royal family) were the first to expand and fortify the settlement. In that way, they controlled the passage of the important commercial salt route over the Traun, from Bad Reichenhall to Munich at the border of the "Erzstift Salzburg" (the archbishopric of Salzburg). In the year 1120, the lords of "Truna" settled in the current urban area because of its favourable strategic position. They built the castle at the border of the city plateau, which is surrounded by the River Traun, as well as its proximity to the main route of commerce.

Traunstein has been part of the state of Bavaria since 1275. It was previously a territory of Salzburg. At the beginning of the 14th century, Traunstein was granted the status of a town. By 1493, the town roads were already cobbled. The Church of St. Oswald was rebuilt in 1501. In 1526, the Lindlbrunnen (Lindl Fountain) was constructed as a completion of the town's water supply.

In the 17th century, salt production, facilitated by the construction of a wooden brine pipeline from Bad Reichenhall brought new industry and significant wealth to the town. The pipeline was constructed between 1616 and 1619 by the master builder of the court, Hans Reiffenstuel.

Traunstein was spared much of the damage experienced by nearby towns during the Thirty Years' War (1618–1648).

On 25 and 26 July 1704, Austrian troops occupied the town in the course of the Spanish War of Succession. A disastrous fire altered the medieval townscape. Despite the occupation by Austrian troops, Traunstein could be rebuilt. The saltworks, finished in 1786/87, assured the survival of salt production in Traunstein.

=== Town fires ===
In its history, Traunstein was struck at least twice by significant town fires: In 1704, when Hungarian "Panduren" set the town on fire in the course of the Spanish War of Succession, and in 1851. However, the "first town fire", which is still familiar to all "real" citizens of Traunstein and is still taught in school today, has not been confirmed. Only archaeological excavations can show whether Traunstein had really suffered a fire disaster before 1400. Written documents provide no information about it. They merely report about a fire, which broke out later, in 1851. At any rate, only 10 houses fell victim to the early fire, and in no case did the whole town. Thereupon, in 1587, a fire arrangement was enacted for the first time in the town's history.

During the night of 25–26 April 1851, a disastrous fire again destroyed almost the whole town. The reason for it has never been discovered. The great fires spread to almost 100 houses, including the Town Hall, the County Court, the Main Salt Office, the Pension Office, the Church, and several gates and towers except the Upper Tower. Just as in 1704, Traunstein was again rebuilt within a few years. It was presumed the fire was an act of revenge by the angry Haslachers. There were feelings of rage because the parochial seat was taken away from Haslach and given to Traunstein. Later rumours came up that the carelessness of a resident had caused the fire. However, there was no evidence to support that idea, and therefore, the person could not be sentenced.

After the town fire, 700 citizens were homeless, but help immediately reached Traunstein. King Maximilian II visited Traunstein on 27 April, contributed consolations, and gave several thousand guilders from his cabinet cash. In return for the quick payment of the fire insurance, the inhabitants could soon begin to rebuild their town from the ground up. The medieval plan of the town square was preserved to a great extent; merely the façades received a new face in the style of the current time.

=== 1900 to present ===
Salt production in Traunstein was finally shut down in 1912. In 1914, the former independent community "Au" became part of Traunstein.

During the First World War what had previously been the site of the salt production facilities became a camp for over 1000 civilian prisoners and prisoners of war. After the war, the 1923 hyperinflation crisis, as in other towns, led to the use of token money denominated in billions.

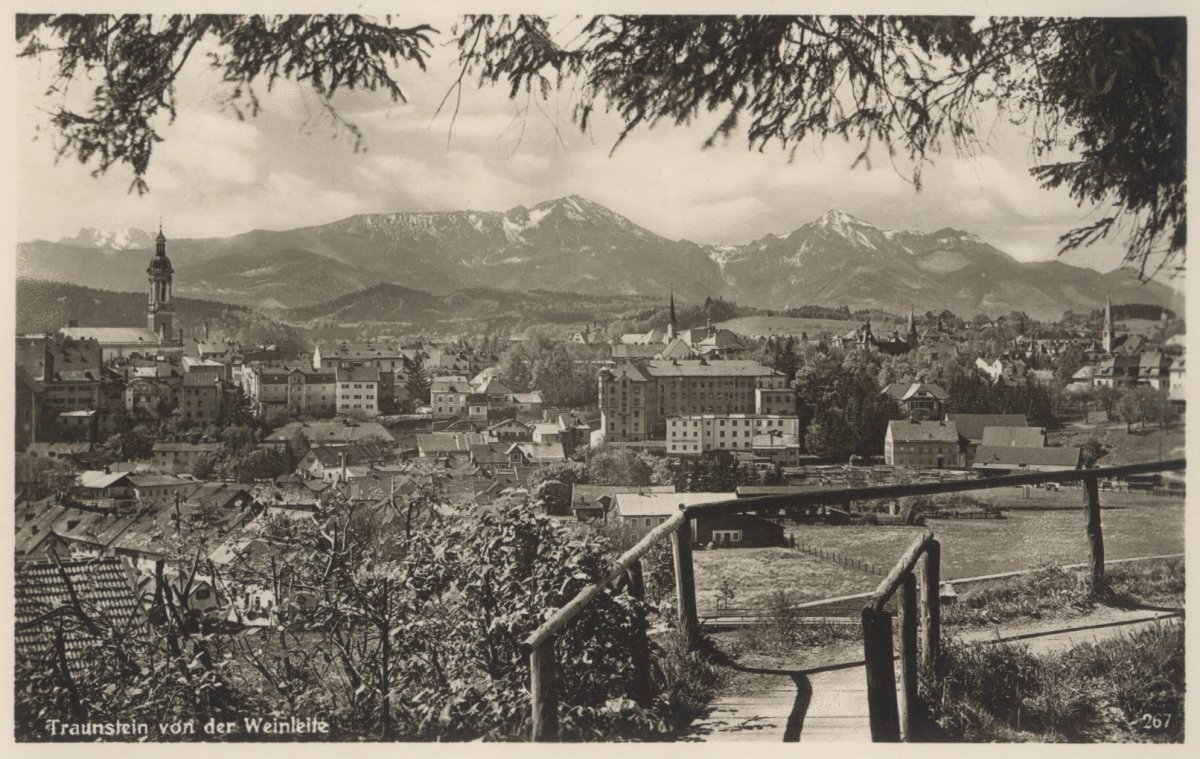
Traunstein in 1930. View of the town from the North. The Hochfelln and Hochgern mountains in the background.

After National Socialists seized power in 1933, a period of active persecution of political dissidents and Jews began in Germany. By November 1938, all Jewish residents of the town had been forcibly removed. Open political resistance during the war years was limited; the town priest, Josef Stelze, was placed briefly in custody, Rupert Berger, Bavarian People's Party representative and the first post-war elected Mayor of Traunstein, was for a period incarcerated in the Dachau concentration camp. In 1939, Traunstein had an estimated population of 11,500. By the end of the war, 523 of that number were registered as killed as a direct result of the conflict, and a further 73 were registered as missing.

During the later stages of the Second World War, Traunstein was four times the target of U.S. Army Air Force aerial bombardment: on 11 November 1944, on 21 January 1945, on 18 April 1945, and finally on 25 April 1945. In April 1945, the heavy air raids destroyed much of the Traunstein station area, an event in which over 100 people died. A short time later, a death march with a few SS guards accompanied by 61 prisoners from the already-liberated Buchenwald concentration camp arrived; and on 5 May, a massacre was carried out, resulting in 60 deaths, and only one survivor. Currently, in Surberg lies a memorial commemorating their deaths. On 3 May 1945, the town surrendered without a struggle.

During World War II, a subcamp of Dachau concentration camp was located here. Whereas Traunstein was a district-free city from 1948–1972, it became the capital of the district of the same name in 1972.

Areas of Traunstein close to the River Traun have been subject to flooding on numerous occasions, most notably in 1899 and again in 2013.

== Climate ==
Climate data for Traunstein (Chieming) (1991–2020 normal)
| Month | Jan | Feb | Mar | Apr | May | Jun | Jul | Aug | Sep | Oct | Nov | Dec | Year |
|---|---|---|---|---|---|---|---|---|---|---|---|---|---|
| Mean daily maximum °C (°F) | 3.3 (37.9) | 5.1 (41.2) | 9.6 (49.3) | 15.0 (59.0) | 18.5 (65.3) | 22.5 (72.5) | 24.1 (75.4) | 23.5 (74.3) | 18.9 (66.0) | 14.5 (58.1) | 8.3 (46.9) | 4.7 (40.5) | 14.0 (57.2) |
| Daily mean °C (°F) | −0.2 (31.6) | 0.6 (33.1) | 4.5 (40.1) | 9.4 (48.9) | 13.1 (55.6) | 17.2 (63.0) | 18.6 (65.5) | 18.0 (64.4) | 13.7 (56.7) | 9.7 (49.5) | 4.5 (40.1) | 1.0 (33.8) | 9.5 (49.1) |
| Mean daily minimum °C (°F) | −3.4 (25.9) | −2.7 (27.1) | 0.4 (32.7) | 3.8 (38.8) | 7.9 (46.2) | 12.0 (53.6) | 13.2 (55.8) | 12.8 (55.0) | 9.2 (48.6) | 5.4 (41.7) | 1.0 (33.8) | −2.1 (28.2) | 4.9 (40.8) |
| Mean monthly sunshine hours | 70.9 | 95.9 | 143.7 | 202.3 | 195.9 | 224.7 | 241.1 | 230.1 | 172.9 | 130.9 | 80.1 | 72.4 | 1,843.1 |
Source: NOAA

== Transport ==
- Road: The Bundesautobahn 8 linking Munich and Salzburg, Austria crosses to the south of the town.
- Rail: The rail link between Munich and Salzburg was established in 1860. Traunstein station remains a major rail intersection with long-distance intercity and local trains connecting to the Ruhpolding branch line, making frequent stops. The station is served by Deutsche Bahn's Intercity and EuroCity trains and Austrian Federal Railways's Railjet trains.
- Aircraft: International airports are located in Munich (120 km or 75 mi) and Salzburg (35 km or 22 mi). A regional aerodrome 21 km (13 mi) north consists of Traunstein in Schönberg.

== Notable people ==
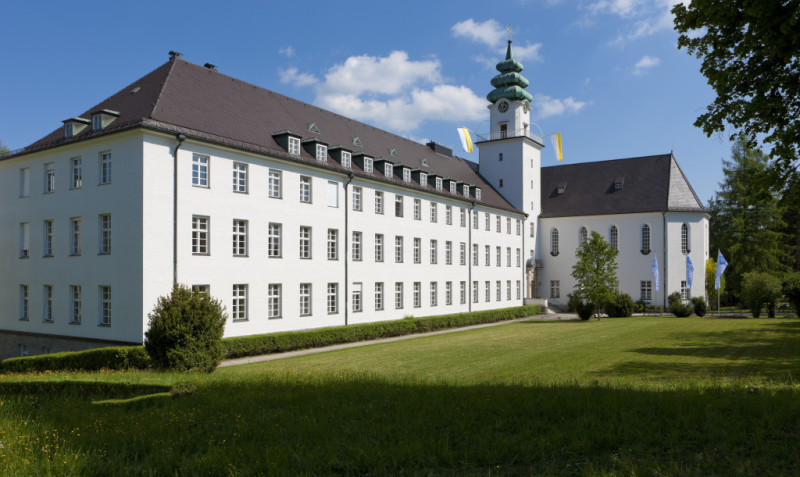
St. Michael Seminary, Traunstein

- Franz Seraph von Kohlbrenner (1728–1783), polymath, propagated the Enlightenment in Bavaria
- Franz Michael Permaneder (1794–1862), Roman Catholic canon lawyer and academic
- August Schneidhuber (1887–1934), SA-Obergruppenführer and Munich Police President, murdered in the Night of the Long Knives
- Adolf Hitler (1889–1945), was a guard at a nearby camp for Russian prisoners of war after World War I
- Rudolf Sellner (1905−1990), actor, dramaturge, director, intendant
- Pope Benedict XVI (1927–2022), spent much of his early childhood and teenage years living in Traunstein, and with his brother Georg attended the St. Michael Seminary in the town
- Emeran Mayer (born 1950), gastroenterologist, neuroscientist, and author

== Twin towns – sister cities ==
Traunstein is twinned with:

- Gap, France
- Haywards Heath, England, United Kingdom
- Pinerolo, Italy
- Wesseling, Germany
- Kinross, Scotland, United Kingdom

== Popular culture ==
Traunstein is the setting for the Austrian-German television crime drama series Der Pass.
