= Georg Ratzinger =

German Catholic prelate and brother of Pope Benedict XVI (1924–2020)

The Reverend Monsignor Georg Ratzinger PA
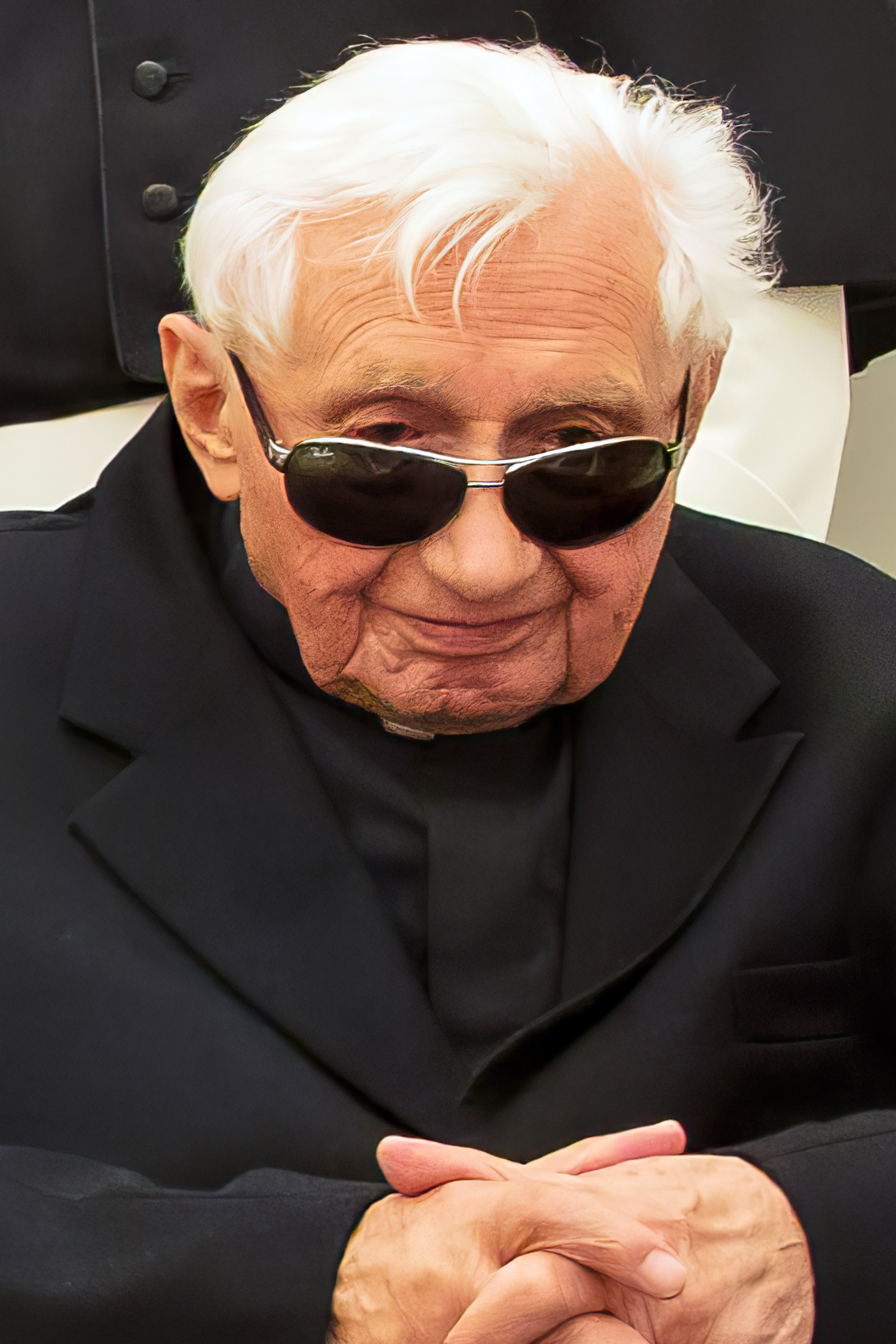
- Monsignor Ratzinger in 2019
- Church: Roman Catholic Church

Orders
- Ordination: 29 June 1951 by Michael von Faulhaber

Personal details
- Born: Georg Ratzinger; 15 January 1924 Pleiskirchen, Bavaria, Germany
- Died: 1 July 2020 (aged 96) Regensburg, Bavaria, Germany
- Denomination: Catholic (Latin Church)
- Parents: Joseph Ratzinger Sr. Maria Peintner
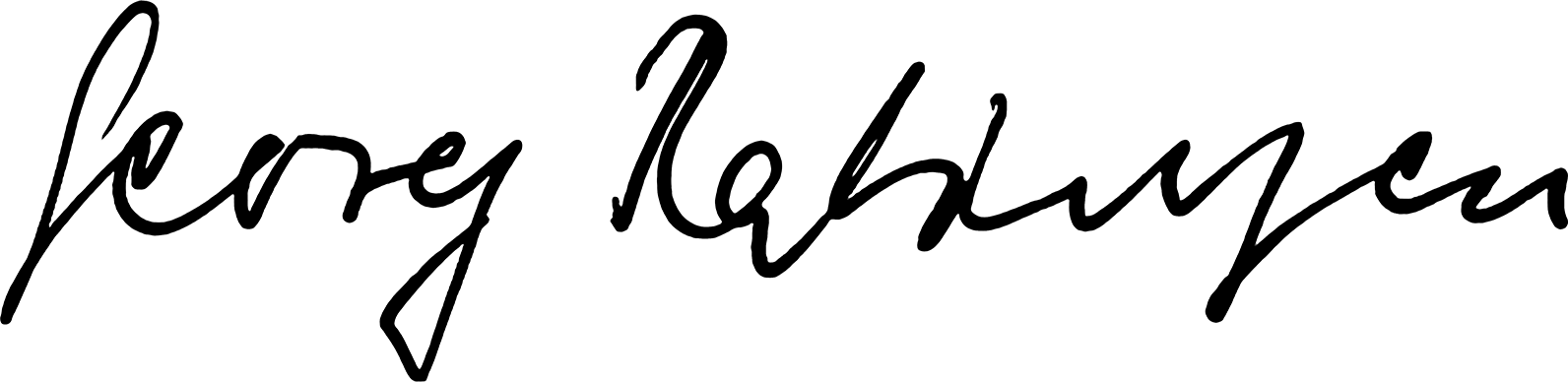
- Signature

Georg Ratzinger PA (15 January 1924 – 1 July 2020) was a German Catholic priest and musician, known for his work as the conductor of the Regensburger Domspatzen, the cathedral choir of Regensburg. He was the elder brother of Pope Benedict XVI. Their great-uncle was the German politician Georg Ratzinger.

== Early life and military service ==
Ratzinger was born in Pleiskirchen, Bavaria, to Joseph Ratzinger Sr. (1877–1959), a police officer, and Maria Ratzinger, née Peintner (1884–1963). His younger brother was Joseph Ratzinger (1927–2022), who later reigned as Pope Benedict XVI from 2005 to 2013, and they had an elder sister, Maria (1921–1991). Early in his life he showed musical talent, playing the church organ already at the age of 11. In 1935 he entered the minor seminary in Traunstein and had professional musical instruction there. In 1941 he encountered for the first time the choir of the Regensburger Domspatzen, which he would later direct, when they performed in Salzburg on the occasion of the 150th anniversary of Mozart's death.

During World War II, in the summer of 1942, Ratzinger was drafted to the Reichsarbeitsdienst and the same autumn to the Wehrmacht. On 12 June 1944, he was shot through the arm during a fight in Bolsena, Italy. At the end of the war, he was a prisoner of war of the U.S. Army in the vicinity of Naples, but was soon released and arrived home in July 1945.

== Education and ordination ==
In January 1946, he and his brother Joseph entered the seminary of the archdiocese of Munich and Freising to study for the priesthood. At the same time he pursued his musical studies. Georg and Joseph were ordained priests in 1951 by Cardinal Michael von Faulhaber. Afterwards, Ratzinger studied Church music in Munich, while serving in different priestly functions for the diocese.

== Regensburger Domspatzen ==
Ratzinger completed his studies in 1957 and became chorus director in his home parish in Traunstein. In February 1964 he was made musical director, Domkapellmeister, at St. Peter's Cathedral in Regensburg, thereby becoming the chorus master of the cathedral choir, the Regensburger Domspatzen.

In 1977 Ratzinger conducted the Domspatzen at his brother Joseph's consecration as Archbishop of Munich and Freising. They sang in honor of Queen Elizabeth II at her state visit in 1978, and at Pope John Paul II's visit to Munich in 1980. They also gave a concert for the state guests at the NATO summit in 1982 under the auspices of President of Germany Karl Carstens.

In 2010 Ratzinger indicated he would be prepared to testify to aid investigations into claims of abuse at the Regensburger Domspatzen choir in Germany. The Regensburg Diocese said that a former singer came forward with allegations of sexual abuse in the early 1960s, predating Ratzinger's tenure from 1964 to 1994.

=== Allegations of sexual and physical abuse under his directorship ===
A man who lived in the choir-linked boarding school until 1967 contended that "a sophisticated system of sadistic punishments in connection with sexual lust" had been installed there. Der Spiegel quoted the man, the composer Franz Wittenbrink, as saying it would be inexplicable that the pope's brother did not know anything about it.

Ratzinger admitted slapping pupils in the face. He commented: "At the start, I also slapped people in the face, but I always had a bad conscience". He said he had been relieved when corporal punishment was forbidden in 1980. Ratzinger denied any knowledge of sexual abuse. A Vatican spokesperson stated that the allegations on sexual abuse, particularly the Regensburg case, are a campaign aimed against the pope and the Roman Catholic Church comparable to Nazi propaganda.

A lawyer commissioned by the choir to look into the accusations concluded that over 200 young singers were abused to various degrees, with at least 40 of the cases involving sexual violence, and that he must assume that Ratzinger had known. A report in 2017 faulted Ratzinger "in particular for 'looking away' or for failing to intervene" and also stated that, "with a high degree of plausibility", between the years 1945 and 1992, 547 boys were victims of physical or sexual abuse, or both.

== Later life ==
Ratzinger retired from his position as director of the choir in 1994 and was made canon in Regensburg on 25 January 2009. In 2005, during a visit to his brother in Rome, symptoms of heart failure and arrhythmia led to a brief admission at the Agostino Gemelli University Polyclinic.

On 29 June 2011, Ratzinger celebrated 60 years as a priest and gave an interview on the topic, during which he noted that during the ordination ceremony, "My brother was the second to youngest, though there were some who were older." He also noted that "I have the stole and the cassock from that day". He celebrated his 90th birthday in 2014 with Benedict XVI in the Vatican. His birthday party was organized by Vatican journalist Michael Hesemann and the guests included American religion journalist Lauren Green, who played the piano, Georg Gänswein and Gerhard Ludwig Müller. The celebrations included a personal letter written by Maria Elena Bergoglio to Ratzinger.

=== Illness and death ===
On 18 June 2020, Ratzinger was reportedly "seriously" unwell while his brother Benedict XVI visited him in Regensburg. He died two weeks later on 1 July 2020, aged 96.

== Honours and awards ==
- Black Wound Badge (1944)
- Iron Cross 2nd Class (1944)
- Bavarian Order of Merit (1983)
- Protonotary apostolic (1993)
- Austrian Cross of Honour for Science and Art, 1st class (2004)
- Honorary citizen of Castel Gandolfo (2008)
- Grand Cross of the Order of Merit of the Italian Republic (2009)
- Pontifikalvesper of Bishop Gerhard Ludwig Müller of Regensburg Cathedral (2009)
- Award of the Fondazione Pro Musica e Arte Sacra (2010)
