= Regensburger Domspatzen =

German boys' and men's choir

- Choir
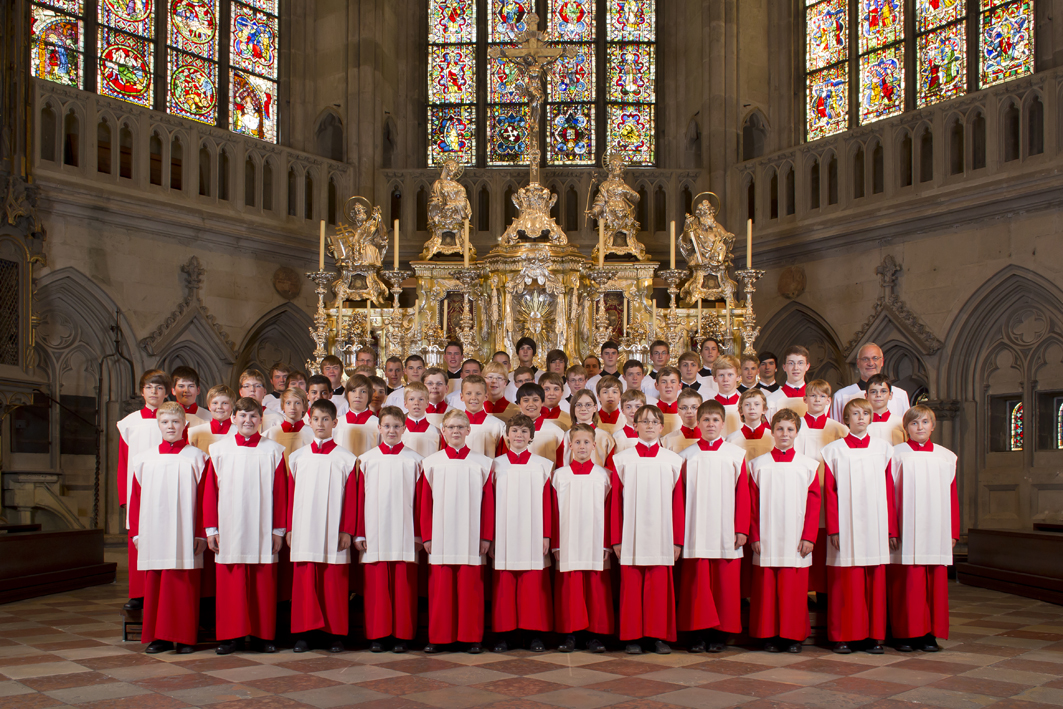
- Domspatzen at the Regensburg Cathedral
- Origin: Regensburg, Bavaria, Germany
- Founded: 975; 1051 years ago
- Genre: Boys' choir
- Chief conductor: Christian Heiß
- Website: www.domspatzen.de

The Regensburger Domspatzen (literally: Regensburg Cathedral Sparrows) is the cathedral choir at the Regensburg Cathedral in Regensburg, Bavaria, Germany. The boys' choir dates back to 975, and consists of boys and young men only. They perform in liturgy and concert, and have made international tours and recordings.

== History and organization ==
The Domspatzen, literally "Cathedral Sparrows", trace their origins back to the year 975 when bishop Wolfgang of Regensburg founded a cathedral school that – among other things – instructed boys to sing in the liturgy. It is the oldest choir in the world. The boys choir has seen various ups and downs during its history of more than a thousand years. In the 20th century, however, the Domspatzen became world-famous, especially through the achievement of the two directors who were to shape them over the course of 70 years: Theobald Schrems (Domkapellmeister 1924 to 1964) and Georg Ratzinger (1964–1994).

Schrems laid the foundations that enabled the choir's success by giving the Domspatzen their current institutional makeup: a boarding school for boys aged 10–19, a private secondary school with emphasis on musical education, and the choir at the center of the structure. In this way the boys can practise singing together and learn under the same roof, which allows for greater efficiency and thus also helps to avoid exhaustion of the students. Ratzinger oversaw the choir becoming a stable concert presence and consolidated and enhanced its quality. Since 1994, Roland Büchner has been Domkapellmeister; the first layman after centuries of conductors from the clergy.

=== Domkapellmeister ===
- 1551–1568: Johann Simon
- 1679–1691: Johann Georg Reichwein
- 1769–1801: Fortunatus Cavallo
- 1801–1834: Wenzeslaus Cavallo
- 1838–1839: Johann Evangelist Deischer
- 1839–1871: Joseph Schrems
- 1871–1882: Franz Xaver Haberl
- 1882–1882: Michael Haller
- 1882–1885: Ignaz Mitterer
- 1885–1891: Max Rauscher
- 1891–1924: Franz Xaver Engelhart
- 1924–1963: Theobald Schrems
- 1964–1994: Georg Ratzinger
- 1994–2019: Roland Büchner
- since 2019: Christian Heiß

=== Corporal punishment and sexual abuse scandals ===
In the wake of worldwide scandals, cases of sexual abuse at the choir school became public in March 2010, some of them dating back to 1958. The two named perpetrators both died in 1986. Former choir director Georg Ratzinger has denied knowledge of sexual abuse. The case has taken additional prominence because Georg Ratzinger is the brother of Pope Benedict XVI. A report in 2017 stated that at least 547 boys were victims of physical abuse, sexual abuse or both between the years 1945 and 1992. Current bishop Rudolf Voderholzer announced plans to offer victims compensation of between 5,000 and 20,000 euros ($5,730 US and $22,930) each by the end of the year. The report faulted Ratzinger "in particular for 'looking away' or for failing to intervene." The report also stated that former bishop Gerhard Ludwig Müller, whom Pope Benedict XVI later named prefect of the Congregation for the Doctrine of the Faith, bears "clear responsibility for the strategic, organizational and communicative weaknesses" for his poor efforts to investigate claims of past abuse when they surfaced. In 2022, the Roman Catholic Church allowed girls to form a choir and perform in the Regensburger Cathedral.

== Recordings and tours ==
The choir has made numerous recordings (e.g. Bach's Christmas Oratorio, his motets, Psalmen Davids by Heinrich Schütz, and Handel's Messiah. It made concert tours throughout the world, including the United States, Scandinavia, Canada, Taiwan, Japan, Ireland, Poland, Hungary and the Vatican, in addition to an annual tour in Germany.

== Performances ==
The choir performed in honor of Queen Elizabeth II on the occasion of her State Visit to Germany in 1978, and at Pope John Paul II’s visit to Munich in 1980. They also gave a concert in Bonn for the state guests at the NATO summit in 1982 under the auspices of then German president Karl Carstens. In 2006 they gave a concert in the Vatican City for Pope Benedict XVI, the brother of the former Domkapellmeister Georg Ratzinger. The main purpose of the choir, however, remains the music in the liturgy of Regensburg Cathedral, where the religious services of Holy Week constitute the prime event of the liturgical, and thus also the musical year.
