= Spivakovsky =

Spivakovsky is a surname. Notable people with the surname include:

- Adolf Spivakovsky (1891–1958), Russian-born Australian vocal teacher
- Daniil Spivakovsky (born 1969), Russian film and theater actor
- Jacob Spivakovsky, Russian actor
- Jascha Spivakovsky (1896–1970), Ukrainian pianist
- Tossy Spivakovsky (1906–1998), American violinist
