= Leonid Kreutzer =

Russian pianist (1884–1953)

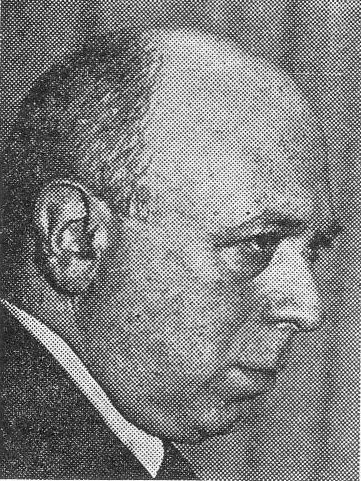
- Born: March 13, 1884; St. Petersburg, Russia
- Died: October 30, 1953; Tokyo, Japan
- Other name: Леонид Давидович Крейцер
- Occupations: Pianist; conductor
- Children: Ryoko Kreutzer (soprano singer)

Leonid Kreutzer (13 March 1884 – 30 October 1953) was a Russian-born classical pianist and teacher.

== Life and career ==
Kreutzer was born in St. Petersburg into a Jewish family. He studied composition under Alexander Glazunov and piano under Anna Yesipova. He was a highly influential piano teacher at the Berlin Academy of Music (Berliner Hochschule für Musik), together with Egon Petri. Amongst Kreutzer's students were Władysław Szpilman, Hans-Erich Riebensahm, Vladimir Horbowski, Karl-Ulrich Schnabel, Franz Osborn, Boris Berlin, Ignace Strasfogel, Franz Reizenstein and Grete Sultan. Leonid Kreutzer also gave musically and technically demanding solo recitals, mostly dedicated to specific composers or themes. At some of these, notably in June 1925, he performed works of contemporaries or modern, avant-garde composers of his time or of the recent past such as César Franck, Claude Debussy, Paul Hindemith and Paul Juon.

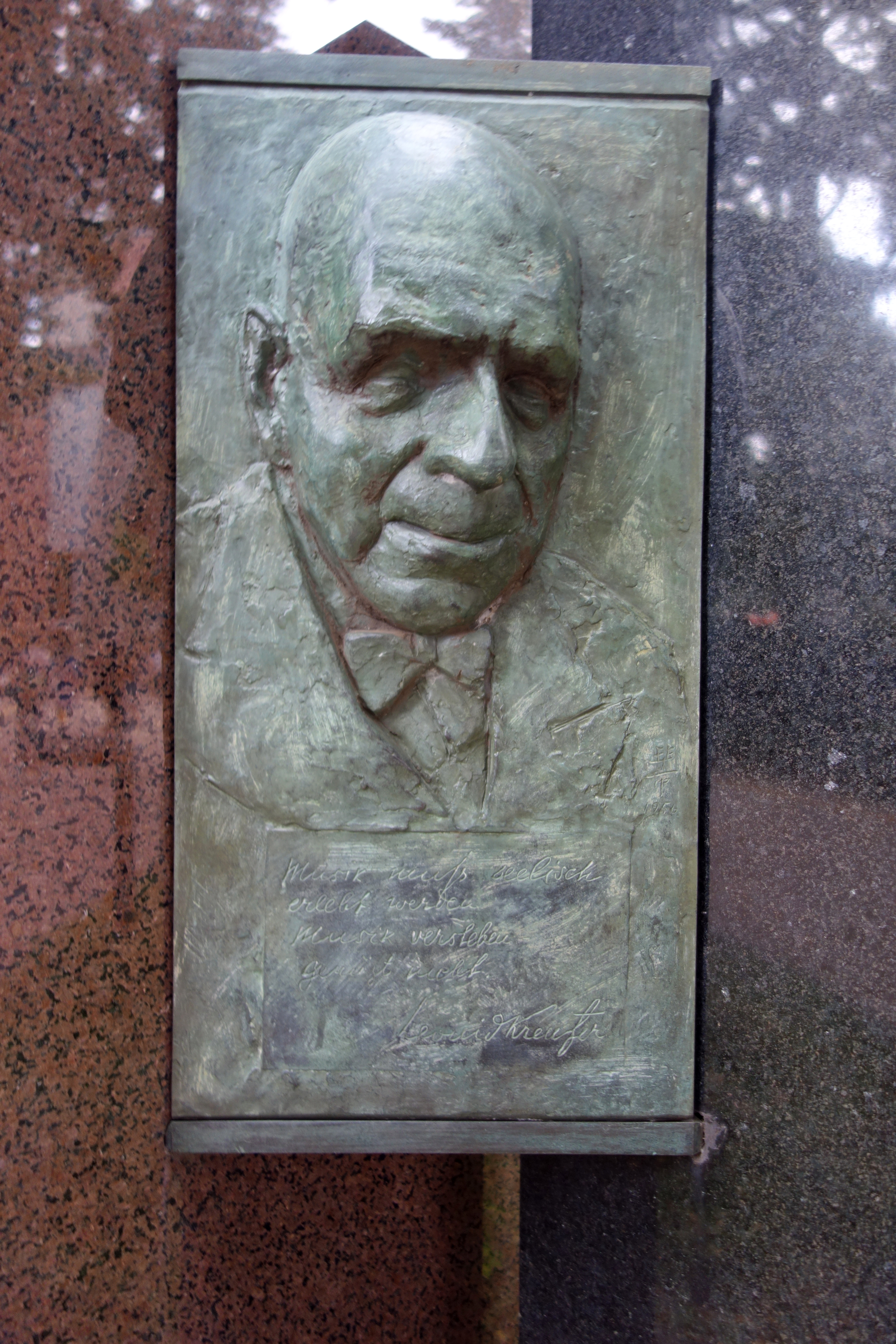
Memorial in the Tokyo University of the Arts campus, Ueno, Tokyo, Japan.

The Nazis targeted him prominently as a cultural enemy: Together with Frieda Loebenstein he is the one of two pianists whose name appears in a list of "tidy-up tasks" ("Aufräumungsarbeiten") compiled by Rosenberg's "Kampfbund für deutsche Kultur" (Battle-Union for German Culture). He emigrated in 1933 to Tokyo, Japan. He is also known as editor of Chopin's works at the Ullstein-Verlag. He wrote one of the first works on systematic use of the piano pedal ("Das normale Klavierpedal vom akustischen und ästhetischen Standpunkt", 1915). One of his students was the deaf pianist Ingrid Fuzjko Hemming.

There are pianos which are built under his name in Japan.

Kreutzer married one of his pupils; his daughter is the soprano Ryoko Kreutzer.
