= Denkmäler =

Denkmäler (German: Monuments) may refer to:

- Denkmäler deutscher Tonkunst ("Monuments of German musical art," 1892-1931)
- Denkmäler der Tonkunst in Österreich ("Monuments of musical art in Austria," 1959-)
- Denkmäler aus Ägypten und Äthiopien ("Monuments of Egypt and Ethiopia)
