= Philipp Scharwenka =

Ludwig Philipp Scharwenka
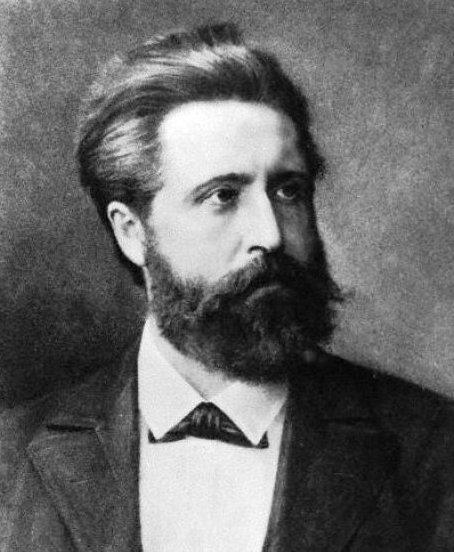
- L. P. Scharwenka

Background information
- Born: 16 February 1847; Samter, Prussia
- Died: 16 July 1917 (aged 70) Bad Nauheim, German Empire
- Genre: Classical
- Occupations: Pianist, composer
- Instrument: Piano

Ludwig Philipp Scharwenka (16 February 1847 – 16 July 1917) was a Polish-German composer and teacher of music. He was the older brother of Xaver Scharwenka.

== Early training ==
Scharwenka was born in Szamotuły (Samter), Grand Duchy of Posen. Like his younger brother Xaver he received his first intermittent musical instruction in Posen (today Poznań). After the closure of the Gymnasium (college) in 1865 he studied music theory together with his brother under Richard Wüerst and Heinrich Dorn at the new Musical Academy in Berlin where, from 1868, he himself was taken on as teacher of Theory and Composition. In this period his own first compositions appeared. In 1874 he brought out an overture and a symphony for the first time in a concert of his own.

== Compositions ==
His many teaching obligations notwithstanding, Philipp Scharwenka stood in the front line as a composer and was recognised as such during his lifetime. His compositions include three Symphonies, Symphonic Poems, a Violin concerto, some Choral works (of which Sakuntala became very famous), the 4-act opera Roland, as well as numerous instrumental works such as Sonatas, Quartets, Caprices and Dances. Many of the major conductors of the period, including Arthur Nikisch, Anton Seidl and Hans Richter, performed his orchestral works. He is still known for his chamber works, including two piano trios, two trios for violin, viola, and piano, two violin sonatas, one viola sonata, one cello sonata, two string quartets, and one piano quintet.

In contrast to his brother's extroverted compositions, Philipp's many-sided works have dreamlike and thoroughly moody inflections. His best-liked works are the chamber works beginning in 1896, which maintain traditional formal models and show a considerable variety of melodic and rhythmical inventions. In them, Scharwenka achieved (despite the conservative restraints of the time in which he was writing) through very refined compositional techniques, something approaching an impressionistic tonal palette. These works found such distinguished interpreters as Willy Burmester, Julius Klengel, and Moritz Mayer-Mahr.

One of his admirers was Max Reger, who in 1898 dedicated his Phantasiestücke op. 26 to him. In the context of the 37th Composer-Congress in 1900, his Dramatic Fantasy for Orchestra op 108, being crowned with a prize by the National German Music-Society, was performed in Bremen.

== Conservatory director ==
At the opening of the Scharwenka-Conservatory in Berlin, his brother Xaver entrusted to him in 1881 the direction of the Theory and Composition teaching, and then in 1891 that of the sister-conservatory in New York. Philipp however returned to Berlin in 1892 to take control of the Conservatory there, which in 1893 he merged with the Piano School of Karl Klindworth to form the Klindworth-Scharwenka Conservatory. This went on to become an outstanding institution in the musical landscape of Berlin. As Director of the Conservatory, Scharwenka remained active until his death in 1917. Otto Klemperer studied with him in Berlin, and Oskar Fried was another very distinguished pupil of his. See: List of music students by teacher: R to S#Philipp Scharwenka.

== Other ==
In 1880 Philipp married violin virtuoso Marianne Scharwenka (née Marianne Stresow, d. 1918). In 1937 his son Walter Scharwenka took over as director at the Conservatory.

Also, Scharwenka possessed a remarkable talent as a graphic illustrator, which is seen, for instance, in the drastic-humorous Figures for the satire by Alexander Moszkowski (the brother of fellow composer Moritz Moszkowski), Anton Notenquetscher.

== Works ==
=== Symphonies ===
- Symphony No. 1, Herbstfeier, for Soli, Choir, and Orchestra on a text by Friedrich Timpe, Op. 44 (1883)
- Arkadische Symphonie in B major, Op. 87 (1887; more usually called Arkadische Suite)
- Symphony No. 2 in D minor, Op. 96 (1895)
- Symphony No. 3, Sinfonia Brevis in E♭ major, Op. 115 (1905)

=== Orchestral ===
- Serenade for Orchestra, Op. 19 (1871)
- Two Polish Folk Dances for Orchestra, Op. 20 (1872)
- Wald- & Berggeister (Forest and Mountain Sprites), Intermezzo for Orchestra, Op. 37 (1882)
- Liebesnacht (Love Night), Fantasiestück for Orchestra, Op. 40 (1881)
- Fest-Ouvertüre (Festive Overture) for Orchestra, Op. 43 (1882)
- Sakuntala for soloists, choir and orchestra on a text by Carl Wittkowsky, WoO (1884)
- Arkadische Suite (Arcadian Suite) in B♭ major for Orchestra, Op. 76 (1887)
- Frühlingswogen (Spring Waves) for Orchestra, Op. 87 (1891)
- Traum & Wirklichkeit (Dream and Reality) for Orchestra, Op. 92 (1894)
- Dramatische Phantasie (Dramatic Fantasy) for Orchestra, Op. 108 (1900)

=== Concertos ===
- Violin Concerto in G major, Op. 95 (1894)

=== Chamber music ===
- Romanze und Scherzo for Violin and Piano, Op. 10
- 3 Konzertstücke for Violin and Piano, Op. 17
- Cavatine for Cello and Piano, Op. 22
- Piano Trio No. 1 in F minor, Op. 26
- Arie for Violin and Piano, Op. 51
- Barcarolle und Polonaise for Violin and Piano, Op. 52
- 4 Stücke for Violin & Piano, Op. 53
- Elegy and Caprice Slave for Cello & Piano, Op. 98
- Suite for Violin and Piano, Op. 99
- Piano Trio No. 2 in C♯ minor, Op. 100
- 4 Konzertstücke for Violin & Piano, Op. 104
- Piano Trio No. 3 in A major, Op. 105
- Viola Sonata in G minor, Op. 106
- Violin Sonata No.1 in B minor, Op. 110
- Piano Trio No. 4 in G major, Op. 112
- Violin Sonata No.2 in E minor, Op. 114
- Cello Sonata in G minor, Op. 116
- String Quartet No.1 in D minor, Op. 117 (reduction of the Symphony No. 2 in D minor, Op. 96)
- Piano Quintet in B minor, Op. 118
- String Quartet No.2 in D major, Op. 120
- Piano Trio No. 5 in E minor, Op.121

=== Voice ===
- 5 Songs, Op. 28
- Dörpertanzweise for Soprano, Alto, Baritone, Bass, and Piano, Op. 35
- Die Lindenwirthin, Songs for Voice & Piano, Op. 62a
- 3 Lieder for Voice & Piano, Op. 62b
- 3 Lieder for Voice & Piano, Op. 88
- Abendfeier in Venedig, Op. 89
- 3 Gesänge for Choir a capella, Op. 90
- 3 Gesänge, Op. 102a
- 2 Gesänge, Op. 102b
- 4 Songs on Russian Texts, Op. 111
- An den König for Soprano, Alto, Baritone, Bass, and Organ, Op. 113
- 3 Gesänge for Three-Part Female Choir and Piano, Op. 119

=== Piano ===
- Polish Dance for Piano, Op. 3
- Capriccietto for Piano, D minor, Op. 4
- 3 Scènes de Dance for Piano, Op. 5
- Scènes de Dance for Piano, Op. 6
- Phantasiestück for Piano, Op. 11
- Introduction & Polonaise pathétique for Piano, Op. 12
- Humoreske und Mazurka for piano, Op. 13
- 2 Nocturnes for Piano, Op. 16
- Miscellen, 6 Piano Pieces, Op. 18
- Tanz-Suite for Piano 4-Hands, Op. 21
- Hochzeitsmusik (Wedding Music) for Piano 4 hands, Op. 23
- Menuett & Perpetuum Mobile for Violin & Piano, Op. 24
- Capriccio (No.1) for Piano, Op. 25
- 5 Fantasiestücke for Piano, Op. 26b?
- Albumblätter, 5 kleine Stücke for Piano, Op. 27
- 3 Mazurkas for Piano, Op. 29
- 2 Pieces for Piano 4-Hands, Op. 30
- 3 Humoresken for Piano, Op. 31
- In Bunter Reihe, 6 Pieces for Piano, Op. 32
- Album polonais for Piano, Op. 33
- Aus der Jugendzeit, 10 easy Piano Pieces, Op. 34
- Bergfahrt, 12 Klavierstücke, Op. 36
- Polnische Tanzweisen, Op. 38
- 4 Bagatelles for Piano, Op. 39
- 5 Piano Pieces, Op. 41
- 3 Pieces for Piano Four-Hands, Op. 42
- Festklänge für die Jugend, 8 Piano Pieces, Op. 45
- 4 Moments Musicaux for Piano, Op. 46
- Capriccio (No.2) for Piano, Op. 47
- 5 Intermezzi for Piano, Op. 48
- 5 Improvisations for Piano, Op. 49
- Scherzo in B♭ minor for Piano, Op. 50
- Lieder und Tanzweisen for Piano 4-Hands, Op. 54
- Divertimenti, 10 Piano Pieces, Op. 55
- 3 Pieces for Piano 4-hands, Op. 56
- Stimmungsbilder, 6 Pieces for Piano 4-hands, Op. 57
- Zum Vortrag, 9 Leichte & Mittelschwere Klavierstücke, Op. 58
- Herbstbilder, 6 Klavierstücke for Piano 4-Hands, Op. 59
- 6 Seestücke nach Texten von Heinrich Heine for Piano, Op. 60
- Piano Sonata No. 1 in A major, Op. 61a
- Piano Sonata No. 2 in F♯ minor, Op. 61b
- Piano Sonata No. 3 in G minor, Op. 61c
- Lose Blätter, 5 Klavierstücke, Op. 63
- Kinderspiele I, 8 easy Piano Pieces, Op. 64
- 5 Romantische Episoden for Piano, Op. 65
- 3 Tanz-Kaprizen for Piano, Op. 66
- 6 Klavierstücke, Op. 67
- Kinderspiele II, 8 Leichte Stücke for piano, Op. 68
- 6 Tonbilder in Kleinem Rahmen for Piano Op. 69
- 2 Ländler for Piano Op. 70a
- 3 Tänze: Menuett, Mazurka, & Waltz for Piano, Op. 70b
- Für die Jugend for Piano, Op. 71
- Aus Vergangenen Tagen, 5 Phantasiestücke for Piano, Op. 72
- 5 Impromptus for Piano, Op. 73
- 2 Elegische Gesänge for Piano, Op. 74
- 5 Tanzscenen for Piano 4-Hands, Op. 75
- 4 Klavierstücke, Op. 77
- Suite de Danses caractéristiques for Piano, Op. 78
- 8 Vortragsstücke for Piano, Op. 79
- 6 Vortragsstücke in leichter Spielart for Piano, Op. 80
- 7 Piano Pieces, Op. 81
- Lyrische Episoden, 6 Piano Pieces, Op. 82
- 5 Klavierstücke, Op. 83
- Skizzen, 5 Piano Pieces, Op. 84
- 2 Rhapsodieen for Piano, Op. 85
- 2 Tanz-Impromptus for Piano, Op. 86
- 3 Scherzi for Piano Duet, Op. 91
- 4 Mazurkas for Piano, Op. 93
- Ballade for Piano, Op. 94a
- Nachtstück for Piano, Op. 94b
- 4 Klavierstücke, Op. 97
- 5 Klavierstücke, Op. 101
- Tanz-Novelle, 5 Tanzpoëme for Piano 4-Hands, Op. 103
- Abendstimmungen, 6 Piano Pieces, Op. 107
- Heimat, 5 Phantasietänze in polnischer Art for Piano 4-hands, Op. 109
