= Denkmäler deutscher Tonkunst =

Historical edition of music from Germany

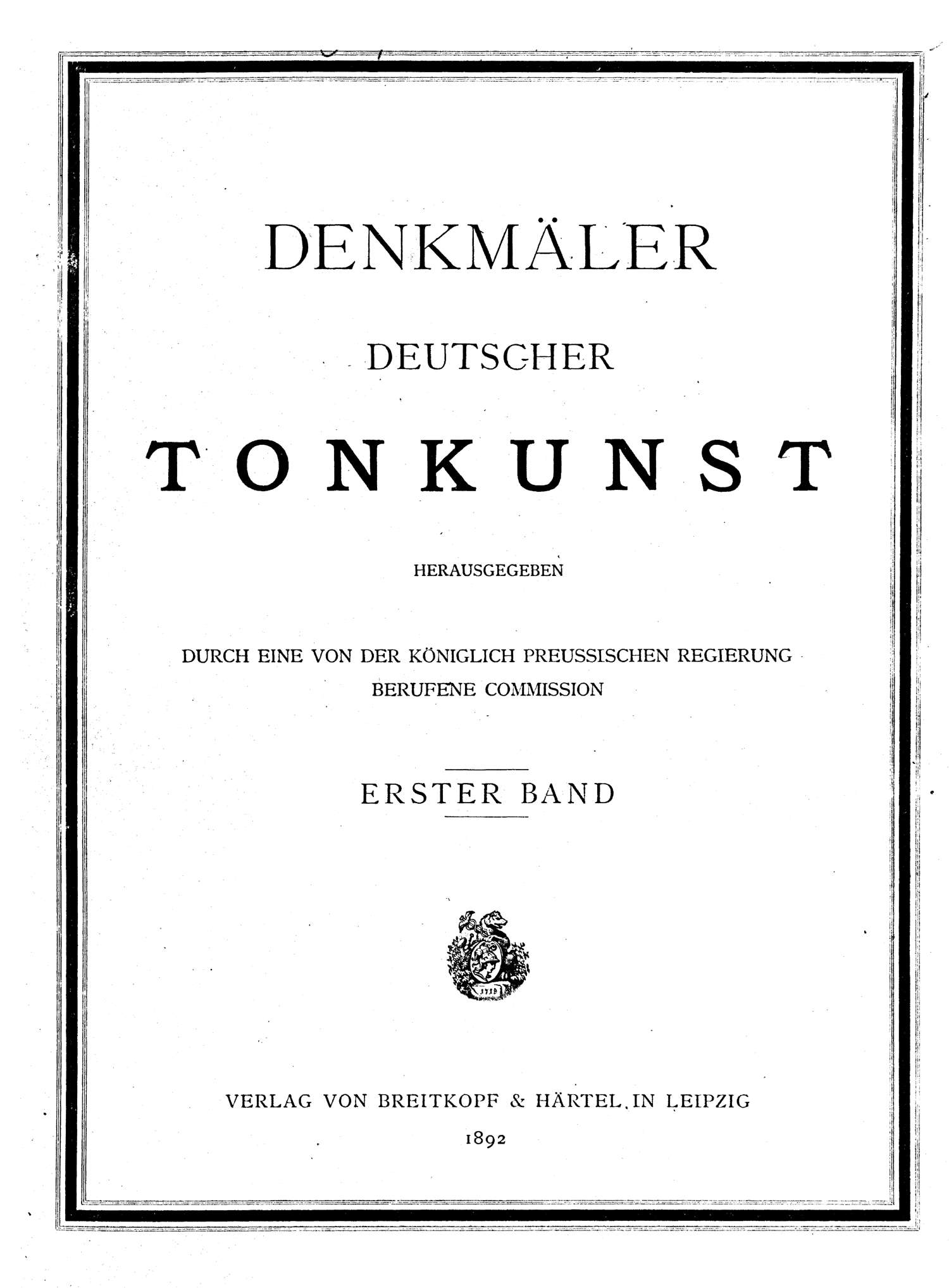
Front Page of the first volume of "Denkmäler Deutscher Tonkunst"

Denkmäler deutscher Tonkunst (literally "Monuments of German musical art") is a historical edition of music from Germany, covering the Baroque and Classical periods.

The edition comprises two series: the first appeared in sixty-five volumes between 1892 and 1931, and the second, which was subtitled Denkmäler der Tonkunst in Bayern (Monuments of musical art in Bavaria), in thirty-six volumes between 1900 and 1931. The first series was issued by a Prussian royal commission of celebrity musicians and musicologists in instalments through the music publishers Breitkopf & Härtel in Leipzig, and the second by the Society for the Publication of Monuments of Musical Art in Bavaria.

A parallel series of volumes on Austrian composers, Denkmäler der Tonkunst in Österreich (Monuments of musical art in Austria), was begun in 1959, and as at 2015-10-25 is in progress at one hundred and fifteen volumes.

References to these editions in this article in common with general practice use the acronyms DdT, DTB, and DTO, and to the Münchener Digitalisierungs Zentrum Digitale Bibliothek with MDZ.

Between 1957 and 1961 the First Series was revised and re-issued by the publishers under the editorship of H. J. Moser again in sixty-five volumes.

In 1962 revision of the Second Series of DdT (i.e., DBT) was begun. By 1970 three volumes (9, 20, and 22) had been revised. San Francisco Public Library lists volumes 34, and 36, with date 1962.

In 1967 the publication of a neue Folge (new series) of DdT : DBT with the same musical content was started by the Gesellschaft für Bayerische Musikgeschichte (Society for Bavarian Music History) via Breitkopf & Härtel. The DdT was dropped and the new series entitled "Denkmaeler der Tonkunst in Bayern". The editors decided on volumes of musical scores, and book-format special volumes (Sonderbände). As at 2015-10-25 twenty-four volumes of musical scores have been published, and two special volumes. Breitkopf & Härtel's catalogue refers.

The Münchener Digitalisierungszentrum (Munich Digitization Centre) of the Bayerische Staatsbibliothek (State Library of Bavaria) has published the 1892 DdT, and 1900 DBT, online.

== Rationale ==
The genesis of DdT is indicated by the title page to Volume One: Denkmäler deutscher Tonkunst herausgegeben durch eine von der königlich Preussischen Regierung berufene Commission (Monuments of German musical art edited by the Commission appointed by the Royal Prussian Government)

The Kingdom of Prussia was ruled at its peak by Emperor William II (1859–1941), and Chancellor Otto von Bismarck (1815–1898). After the resignation of the Chancellor in 1890, the Emperor also presided over the fall of the kingdom. The production of DdT began in 1892, and continued throughout the First World War until 1931 and nearly the start of the Third Reich (1933–1945): an example perhaps of ars longa, vita brevis. The life of DdT was largely independent of the fall of Prussia, and its significance was tempered by the changes in Europe after 1918, and after 1945. The re-evaluation of its contents in the period 1959 to 1970 may be an indication either of the lasting value of the works of older composers from a modern perspective, or of a tendency to retain nationalism in music in some degree. The philosophy of Musica Britannica may hold a similar place in England.

The value of these editions in drawing attention to music by composers who deserved recognition has been illustrated by Sir Jack Westrup.

Bismarck's thoroughness, and efficiency, were thus not limited to the Prussian Army, and the Prussian welfare state, but characteristically extended to the art of music: stepping from the particular of Bismarck's choice to the general of national identity, the expression of national identity became a characteristic throughout the wider continent of Europe during the period 1870 to 1914. For example, national feeling in Czechoslovakia, Russia, and England encouraged the fine art counterparts of folk art that achieved expression in the works of inter alia Smetana, Dvořák, Tchaikovsky, Stravinsky, Holst, and Vaughan Williams.

The foreword to the First Series explains the Commission's philosophy. Die Werke hervorragender älterer deutscher Tonmeister der Kunst und Kunstwissenschaft von neuem zugänglich zu machen, ist längst als eine Aufgabe unserer Zeit erkannt worden. . . .

Translation.——To make accessible again the works of outstanding older German musical masters of art, and of the science of art, has long been realized as a responsibility of our times. The emergence of the collected editions of the works of JOHANN SEBASTIAN BACH, HÄNDEL, SCHÜTZ, and others owes to this realization. Projects like Friedrich Chrysander's "Monuments of Musical Art", and the publications of the Society for Music Research, are wholly or at least in part dedicated to the same purpose in life.

Apart from the merit that these publications attract in themselves, they have at the same time the advantage of more clearly recognizing the difficulties that are considered by general agreement to have been overcome. Consideration of the difficulties suggests the desire for a new enterprise, which would complement the already existing volumes in print, would be compared with them, and at the same time be thought of as comprehensive, and limited: comprehensive, in that the aim of not only the full publication of the works of a single great master would be addressed; and limited, insofar as only compositions of German musicians of the XVI, XVII and XVIII century would be published.

The masters GLUCK and HAYDN may remain aüsser considered as total spending their compositions are great tasks to existing, the solution of which is only a matter of time otherwise scheduled no composer will be to exclude its Werke have a right to continue to live in the German people by historical and artistic importance. In the almost endless riches of such works but it is to call those musical masters the first publication of whom would be in prospect, because it requires preparatory work already long in progress:

(1) Composers of sacred and secular vocal music: HANS LEO HASSLER, SAMUEL SCHEIDT, JOHANN HERMANN SCHEIN, ANDREAS HAMMERSCHMIDT, MELCHIOR FRANCK, ADAM KRIEGER, JOHANN CHRISTOPH BACH (the Eisenach Bach), and JOHANN MICHAEL BACH.

(2) Organ composers: the master of the North German organ school exclusively BUXTEHUDE; also: SAMUEL SCHEIDT, JOHANN PACHELBEL and JOHANN GOTTFRIED WALTHER.

(3) Composers for Clavier and other instruments: JOHANN JAKOB FROBERGER, JOHANN KRIEGER, JOHANN KUHNAU, JOHANN BERNHARD BACH and CARL PHILIPP EMANUEL BACH. The Royal Prussian Ministry of Culture has conceived the attainment of such a plan for the publication of "Monuments of German musical art" headed one of num berufenen Commission and support the Publishing Act Breitkopf und Härtel in Leipzig envisaged. The present sample volume should serve to further illustrate of the company. The recording, which takes the company will prevail for the follow-up and arrangement thereof.

Berlin May 1892.

Johann Christoph Bach (1642–1703) was born in Arnstadt, and died in Eisenach. His compositions are regarded as the most important in the Bach family before Johann Sebastian Bach.

== Glossary ==
German words and English translations with musical use in the context of DdT are given with possible interpretation below. Some words may lead to duplication of meaning.

German word	English translation	Possible interpretation
Band	volume, or tome	volume
eingeleitet	started, initiated, introduced, prefaced, or preluded	introduced
Folge	sequence, succession, sequel, edition, series, set, or suit	series
half	half; as, erster Hälfte, first half	
Herausgabe	of books, etc. publication, issue	publication
herausgegeben	published (of a book, etc.), or edited	edited
Jahrgang	of newspapers annual set, volume	year
Lieferung	delivery, supply, parcel, lot, book trade number, part	instalment
Reihe	row, file, rank, line, series, succession, tier, set, or train	set
Teil, Theil	part, piece, portion, share, or section	part
veröffentlicht	made public, announced, or published	published

== List of volumes in Denkmäler deutscher Tonkunst. Erste Folge. ==
This listing is based upon visual inspection of the digital copies available at the Munich Digitization Centre

Volume	Title	Date
1. Band	Samuel Scheidts Tabulatura Nova für Orgel und Clavier	1892
2. Band	Hans Leo Hasslers Werke. Erster Band. Cantiones sacrae für 4 bis 12 Stimmen	1894
3. Band	Franz Tunders Gesangswerke. Solocantaten und Chorwerke mit Instrumentalbegleitun	1900
4. Band	Johann Kuhnaus Klavierwerke	1901
5. Band	Johann Rudolph Ahles Ausgewählte Gesangswerke mit und ohne Begleitung von Instrumenten	1901
6. Band	Matthias Weckmann und Christoph Bernhard. Solocantaten und Chorwerke mit Instrumentalbegleitung	1901
7. Band	Hans Leo Hasslers Werke. Zweiter Band. Messen für 4 bis 8 Stimmen	1902
8/9. Band	Ignaz Holzbauer. Günther von Schwarzburg : Oper in drei Akten	1902
10. Band	Orchestermusik des XVII. Jahrhunderts. I. Journal du Printemps von Johann Caspar Ferdinand Fischer. II. Zodiacus von D. A. S.	1902
11. Band	Dietrich Buxtehudes Instrumentalwerke. Sonaten für Violine, Gambe und Cembalo	1903
12/13. Band	Arien von Heinrich Albert	1904
14. Band	Dietrich Buxtehude. Abendmusiken und Kirchenkantaten	1903
15. Band	Carl Heinrich Graun. Montezuma : Oper in drei Akten	1904
16. Band	Melchior Franck und Valentin Haussmann. Ausgewählte Instrumentalwerke	1904
17. Band	Johann Sebastiani und Johann Theile. Passionmusiken	1904
18. Band	Sonate da camera von Johann Rosenmüller	1904
19. Band	Arien von Adam Krieger	1905
20. Band	Johann Adolph Hasse. La conversione di Sant’Agostino : Oratorio	1905
21/22. Band	Gesammelte Werke von Friedr. Wilh. Zachow	1905
23. Band	Ausgewählte Werke von Hieronymus Praetorius	1905
24/25. Band	Hans Leo Hasslers Werke. Dritter Band. Sacri concentus für 4 bis 12 Stimmen	1906
26/27. Band	Johann Gottfried Walther. Gesammelte Werke für Orgel	1906
28. Band	Georg Philipp Telemann. Der Tag des Gerichts : Ein Singgedicht in vier Betrachtungen von Christian Wilhelm Alers. Ino : Kantate von Karl Wilhem Ramler	1907
29/30. Band	Instrumentalkonzert deutscher Meister. J. G. Pissendem, J. A. Hasse, C. Ph. E. Bach, G. Ph. Telemann, Chr. Graupner, G. H. Stölzel, K. Fr. Hurlebusch	1907
31. Band	Philippus Dulichius. Prima pars centuriae octonum et septenum vocum. Stetini, 1607	1907
32/33. Band	Nicolo Jommelli. Fetonte : Dramma per musica	1907
34. Band	Newe deudsche geistliche Gesenge für die gemeinen Schulen	1908
35/36. Band	Sperontes. Singende Muse an der Pleisse	1909
37/38. Band	Reinhard Keiser. Der hochmütige, gestürzte und wieder erhabene Croesus	1912
39. Band	Ausgewählte Werke von Johann Schobert	1909
40. Band	Ausgewählte Werke von Andreas Hammerschmidt	1910
41. Band	Philippus Dulichius. Secunda pars centuriæ octonum et septenum vocum	1911
42. Band	Ernst Bach. Sammlung auserlesener Fabeln. und Valentin Herbing. Musikalischer Versuch	1910
43/44. Band	Ausgewählte Ballette Stuttgarter Meister aus der 2 Hälfte des 18. Jahrhunderts. Florian Deller und Johann Joseph Rudolph	1913
45. Band	Heinrich Elmenhorsts Geistliche Lieder komponiert von Johann Wolfgang Franck, Georg Böhm und Peter Laurentius Wockenfuss	1911
46/47. Band	Philipp Heinrich Erlebach. Harmonische Freude musikalischer Freunde. Erster und anderer Teil	1914
48. Band	Johann Ernst Bach. Passionsoratorium	1914
49/50. Band	Thüringische Motetten der ersten Hälfte des 18. Jahrhunderts	1915
51/52. Band	Ausgewählte Kantaten von Christoph Graupner	1926
53/54. Band	Johann Philipp Krieger. 21 ausgewählte Kirchenkompositionen	1916
55. Band	Carlo Pallavicino. La Gerusalemme liberata	1916
56. Band	Johann Christoph Friedrich Bach. Die Kindheit Jesu. Die Auferweckung Lazarus	1917
57. Band	Georg Philipp Telemann. Vierundzwanzig Oden. und Johann Valentin Görner. Sammlung neuer Oden und Lieder	1917
58/59. Band	Sebastian Knüpfer, Johann Schelle, Johann Kuhnau. Ausgewählte Kirchenkantaten	1918
60. Band	Antonio Lotti. Messen	1930
61/62. Band	Georg Philipp Telemann. Tafelmusik	1927
63. Band	Johann Pezel. Turmmusiken und Suiten	1928
64. Band	Georg Benda. Der Jahrmarkt : Eine komische Oper	1930
65. Band	Thomas Stoltzer. Sämtliche lateinische Hymnen und Psalmen	1931
Beihefte 1	Christoph Graupner als Kirchenkomponist. Ausführungen zu Band LI/LII (additions to vol. 51/52) der Denkmäler deutscher Tonkunst, Erste Folge, und Verzeichnis sämtlicher Kantaten Graupners von Friedrich Noack	1926
Beihefte II	G. Ph. Telemann. Musique de Table. Ausführungen zu Band LXI und LXII (additions to vol. 61/62) der Denkmäler deutscher Tonkunst, Erste Folge von Max Seiffert	1927

== List of volumes in Denkmäler deutscher Tonkunst. Zweiter Folge. ==
Denkmäler deutscher Tonkunst. Zweite Folge: Denkmäler der Tonkunst in Bayern : Veröffentlicht durch die Gesellschaft zur Herausgabe von Denkmälern der Tonkunst in Bayern [Monuments of German musical art. Second series: Monuments of musical art in Bavaria : Published by the Society for the Publication of Monuments of Musical Art in Bavaria]

From Volume Twenty-six the words "unter Leitung der Adolf Sandberger" were added to the description.

=== Notes on editing ===
In the following list a forward slash "/" indicates a new line of print.

All words on the title pages of DTB are printed in capital letters. This usage has been interpreted by assignation of capital letters only to nouns, and proper names even when the words begin a new line.

For ease of reference the contents of the title pages are arranged into volume of the whole series, volume description (Jahrgang), title, publisher, and date of publication. From volume thirty-two as Dr Benno Filser Verlag arranged the title pages differently the arrangement has been followed here against the column heading.

Only from volume twenty-one did the publishers print the number of the volume in the whole series (e.g., einundzwanzigster Band der ganzen Reihe).

Minutiae of printing have been maintained: no opening bracket before vierundzwanstigster in volume twenty-four; an unascribed "I." in volume four, and an unascribed "II, 2" in volume fifteen, which are both missing from the descriptions in MDZ.

Volume of whole series	Volume	Title	Publisher	Date
1	erster Jahrgang	E. F. dall' Abaco / ausgewählte Werke, erster Theil	Verlag von Breitkopf & Härtel in Leipzig	1900
2	zweiter Jahrgang / Band I	Klavierwerke von Johann und Wilhelm Hieronymus Pachelbel	Verlag von Breitkopf & Härtel in Leipzig	1901
3	zweiter Jahrgang / Band II	ausgewählte Werke von J. K. Kerll erster Theil	Verlag von Breitkopf & Härtel in Leipzig	1901
4	dritter Jahrgang / Band I	Sinfonien der pfalzbayerischen Schule / (Mannheimer Symphoniker) / I.	Verlag von Breitkopf & Härtel in Leipzig	1902
5	dritter Jahrgang / Band II	Ludwig Senfls Werke erster Teil	Verlag von Breitkopf & Härtel in Leipzig	1903
6	vierter Jahrgang / I. Band	Orgelkompositionen von Johann Pachelbel / nebst beigefügten Stücken von Hieronymus Pachelbel	Verlag von Breitkopf & Härtel in Leipzig	1903
7	vierter Jahrgang / II. Band	ausgewählte Werke von Christian Erbach, erster Teil / Werke Hans Leo Hasslers, erster Teil	Verlag von Breitkopf & Härtel in Leipzig	1903
8	fünfter Jahrgang (Doppelband) / I. Lieferung	Werke Hans Leo Hasslers, zweiter Teil / (Bermerkungen zur Biographie Hans Leo Hasslers und seiner Brüder, / sowie zur Musikgeschichte der Städt Nurnberg und Augsburg / im 16. und zu Anfang des 17. Jahrhunderts von A. Sandberger	Verlag von Breitkopf & Härtel in Leipzig	1904
9	fünfter Jahrgang / II. Lieferung	Werke Hans Leo Hasslers, zweiter Teil / (Notenteil und Einleitung von R. Schwartz)	Verlag von Breitkopf & Härtel in Leipzig	1904
10	sechster Jahrgang / I. Band	Nürnberger Meister der zweiten Hälfte des 17.Jahrhunderts / geistliche Konzerte und Kirchenkantaten / (eingeleitet und herausgegeben von Max Seiffert)	Verlag von Breitkopf & Härtel in Leipzig	1905
11	sechster Jahrgang / II. Band	ausgewählte Werke von Agostino Steffani erster Teil / herausgegeben von Alfred Einstein und Adolf Sandberger	Verlag von Breitkopf & Härtel in Leipzig	1905
12	siebenter Jahrgang / I. Band	ausgewählte Werke von Johann Staden erster Teil / published by Eugen Schmitz	Verlag von Breitkopf & Härtel in Leipzig	1906
13	siebenter Jahrgang / II. Band	Sinfonien der pfalzbayerischen Schule / (Mannheimer Symphoniker) / II. Teil I. Hälfte	Verlag von Breitkopf & Härtel in Leipzig	1906
14	achter Jahrgang / I. Band	ausgewählte Werke von Johann Staden zweiter Teil / herausgegeben von Eugen Schmitz	Verlag von Breitkopf & Härtel in Leipzig	1907
15	achter Jahrgang / Band II	Sinfonien der pfalzbayerischen Schule / (Mannheimer Symphoniker) / II, 2 / herausgegeben von Hugo Riemann	Verlag von Breitkopf & Härtel in Leipzig	1907
16	neunter Jahrgang / Band I	Evaristo Felice dall' Abaco / ausgewählte Werke / zweiter Teil / herausgegeben von Adolf Sandberger	Verlag von Breitkopf & Härtel in Leipzig	1908
17	neunter Jahrgang / Band II	Leopold Mozart / ausgewählte Werke / herausgegeben von Max Seiffert	Verlag von Breitkopf & Härtel in Leipzig	1908
18	zehnter Jahrgang / Band I	Gregor Aichinger / ausgewählte Werke / introduced and edited by Theodor Kroyer	Verlag von Breitkopf & Härtel in Leipzig	1909
19	zehnter Jahrgang / Band II	Adam Gumpelzhaimer / ausgewählte Werke / eingeleitet und herausgegeben von Otto Mayr	Verlag von Breitkopf & Härtel in Leipzig	1909
20	elfter Jahrgang / Band I	Werke Hans Leo Hasslers, dritter Teil / eingeleitet und herausgegeben von Rudolf Schwartz	Verlag von Breitkopf & Härtel in Leipzig	1910
21	elfter Jahrgang / Band II / (einundzwanstigster Band der ganzen Reihe)	ausgewählte Werke von Agostino Steffani, zweiter Teil / (erster Band der Opern) / herausgegeben von Hugo Riemann	Verlag von Breitkopf & Härtel in Leipzig	1912
22	zwölfter Jahrgang / Band I / (zweiundzwanzigster Band der ganzen Reihe)	ausgewählte Sinfonien von Anton Rosetti / eingeleitet und herausgegeben von Oskar Kaul	Verlag von Breitkopf & Härtel in Leipzig	1912
23	zwölfter Jahrgang / Band II / (dreiundzwanstigster Band der ganzen Reihe)	ausgewählte Werke von Agostino Steffani, zweiter Teil / (zweiter Band der Opern) / herausgegeben von Hugo Riemann	Verlag von Breitkopf & Härtel in Leipzig	1912
24	dreizehnter Jahrgang / vierundzwanstigster Band der ganzen Reihe)	ausgewählte Werke von Tommaso Traëtta / eingeleitet und herausgegeben von Hugo Goldschmidt	Verlag von Breitkopf & Härtel in Leipzig	1913
25	vierzehnter Jahrgang / Band I / (fünfundzwanstigster Band der ganzen Reihe)	ausgewählte Werke von Johannes Erasmus Kindermann / erster Teil / herausgegeben von Hugo Riemann	Verlag von Breitkopf & Härtel in Leipzig	1913
26	vierzehnter Jahrgang / Band II / (sechsundzwanzigster Band der ganzen Reihe)	Chr. W. Gluck, Le nozze d'Ercole e d'Ebe / eingeleitet und herausgegeben von Hermann Abert	Verlag von Breitkopf & Härtel in Leipzig	1914
27	fünfzehnter Jahrgang / (siebenundzwanzigster Band der ganzen Reihe)	Mannheimer Kammermusik des 18.Jahrhunderts / erster Teil / eingeleitet und herausgegeben von Hugo Riemann	Verlag von Breitkopf & Härtel in Leipzig	1914
28	sechzehnter Jahrgang / (achtundzwanzigster Band der ganzen Reihe)	Mannheimer Kammermusik des 18.Jahrjunderts / zweiter Teil / eingeleitet und herausgegeben von Hugo Riemann	Verlag von Breitkopf & Härtel in Leipzig	1915
29	siebzehnter Jahrgang / (neunundzwanstigster Band der ganzen Reihe)	ausgewählte Werke von Tommaso Traëtta / zweiter Teil / herausgegeben von Hugo Goldschmidt	Verlag von Breitkopf & Härtel in Leipzig	1916
30	achtzehnter Jahrgang / (dreissigster Band der ganzen Reihe)	Joh. Krieger, Franz Xaver Anton Murschhauser u. Joh. Philipp Krieger / gesammelte Werke für Klavier und Orgel / Herausgegeben von Max Seiffert	Verlag von Breitkopf & Härtel in Leipzig	1917
31	neunzehnter und zwanzigster Jahrgang / (einunddreissigster Band der ganzen Reihe)	Pietro Torri, ausgewählte Werke, Teil I / eingeleitet und herausgegeben von H. Junker	Verlag von Breitkopf & Härtel in Leipzig	1920
32	einundzwanzigster Jahrgang / bis vierundzwanzigster Jahrgang / (zweiunddreissigster Band der ganzen Reihe)	Johann Erasmus Kindermann, ausgewählte Werke / zweiter Teil / herausgegeben nach den hinterlassenen Materialien von / Felix Schreiber / und eingeleitet von / Bertha Antonia Wallner	Augsburg 1924	Verlag von Dr. Benno Filser & Co., Kunstanstalt
33	fünfundzwanzigster Jahrgang / (dreiunddreissigster Band der ganzen Reihe)	Anton Rosetti / ausgewählte Werke – zweiter Teil / ausgewählte Kammermusikwerke / nebst einem Instrumentalkonzert / eingeleitet und herausgegeben von Oskar Kaul	Augsburg 1925	Dr. Benno Filser Verlag G. M. B. H., Augsburg
34	sechsundzwanzigster Jahrgang / (vierunddreissigster Band der ganzen Reihe)	Jacobus de Kerle / ausgewählte Werke – erster Teil / die „Preces speciales etc.‟ / für das Konzil der Trient / 1562 / eingeleitet und herausgegeben von / Otto Ursprung	Augsburg 1926	Dr. Benno Filser Verlag G. M. B. H., Augsburg
35	siebenundzwanzigster und achtundzwanzigster Jahrgang / (fünfunddreissigster Band der ganzen Reihe)	Johann Christoph Pez / ausgewählte Werke	Augsburg 1928	Dr. Benno Filser Verlag G. M. B. H.
36	neunundzwanzigster und dreissigster Jahrgang / (sechsunddreissigster Band der ganzen Reihe)	Andreas Raselius / ausgewählte Werke	Augsburg 1931	Dr. Benno Filser Verlag G. M. B. H.
