= Franz Dorfmüller =

German pianist

Franz Dorfmüller (17 April 1887 in Regensburg – 8 July 1974 in Munich at age 87) was a German pianist, piano teacher and music writer. In addition to guest performances and lectures, he was active at the main venues of Munich, Regensburg, Philadelphia (Pennsylvania) and Nuremberg.

Well-known pupils of Dorfmüller were Hermann Reutter, Heinz Pauels, Franz Josef Breuer, Günter Wand and Karl Holl. During his studies he became a member of the AGV München.

In 1927, Dorfmüller, who was already working as a university lecturer, joined the composer Fritz Büchtger (1903–1978) and the young pianist Udo Dammert (1904–2003) as co-founders of the Vereinigung für zeitgenössische Musik.

== Publications ==
- Kurt Dorfmüller: Zum Münchner Musikleben während des ersten Weltkrieges und der Nachkriegsjahre; Beitrag in 100 Jahre Münchner Philharmoniker, pp. 114–127, ed. by Gabriele E. Meyer. Munich 1994.
- Kurt Dorfmüller: Die Münchner Musikszene: Von den zwanziger Jahren in die NS-Zeit in "Zur Situation der Musik in Deutschland in den dreissiger und vierziger Jahren". Publisher Orff-Zentrum München.
- Anton Kerschensteiner, Ernst Wengenmayer, Oskar Kaul, Franz Dorfmüller, Albert Hartmann, Otto Loesch: Geschichte des Akademischen Gesangvereins München 1861–1961, Munich 1961.
