= Karl Hofer =

German painter

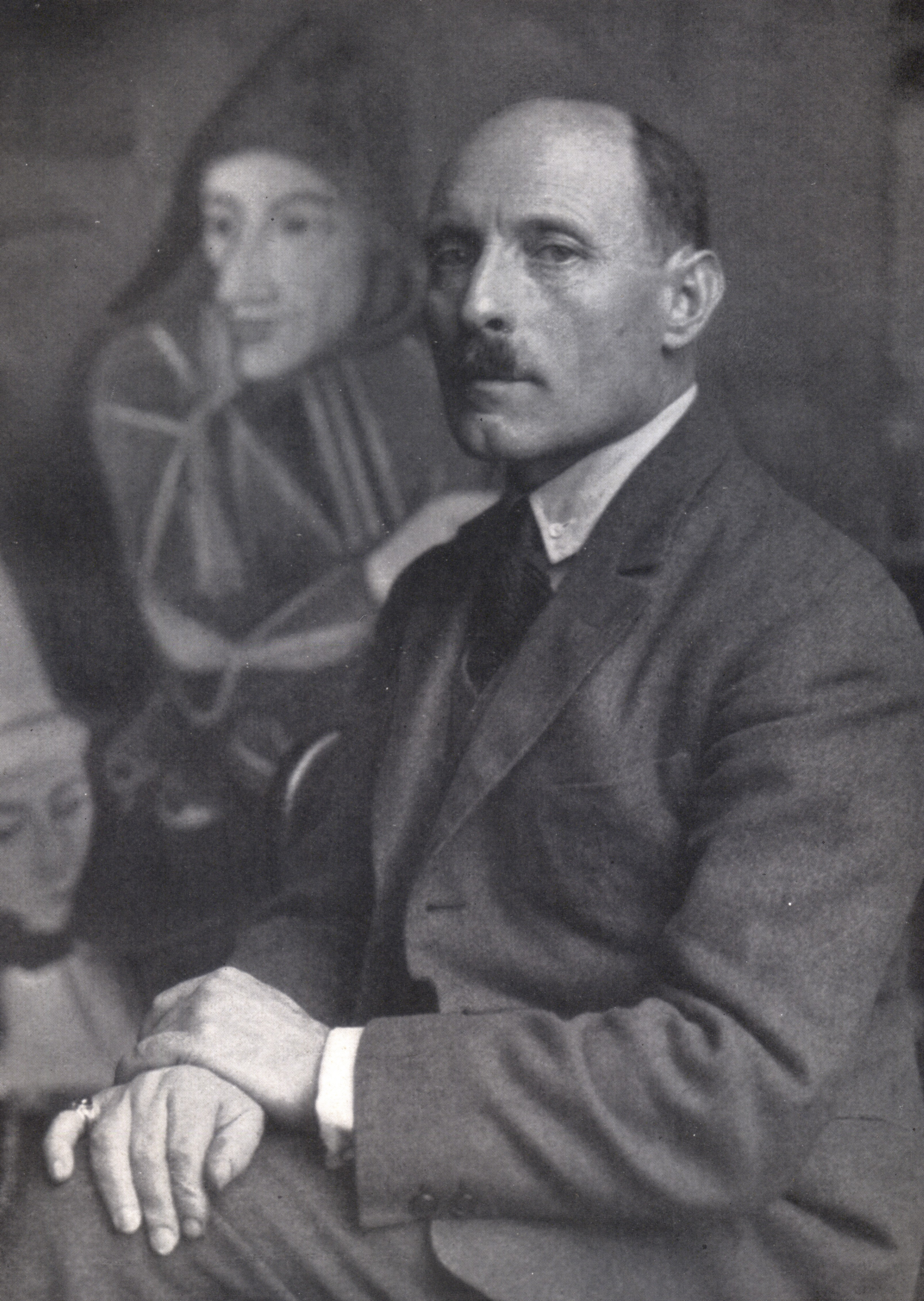
- Karl Hofer in a photograph by Hugo Erfurth (1929)
- Born: Karl Christian Ludwig Hofer; 11 October 1878; Karlsruhe, German Empire
- Died: 3 April 1955 (aged 76); West Berlin, West Germany
- Known for: Painting
- Movement: Expressionism

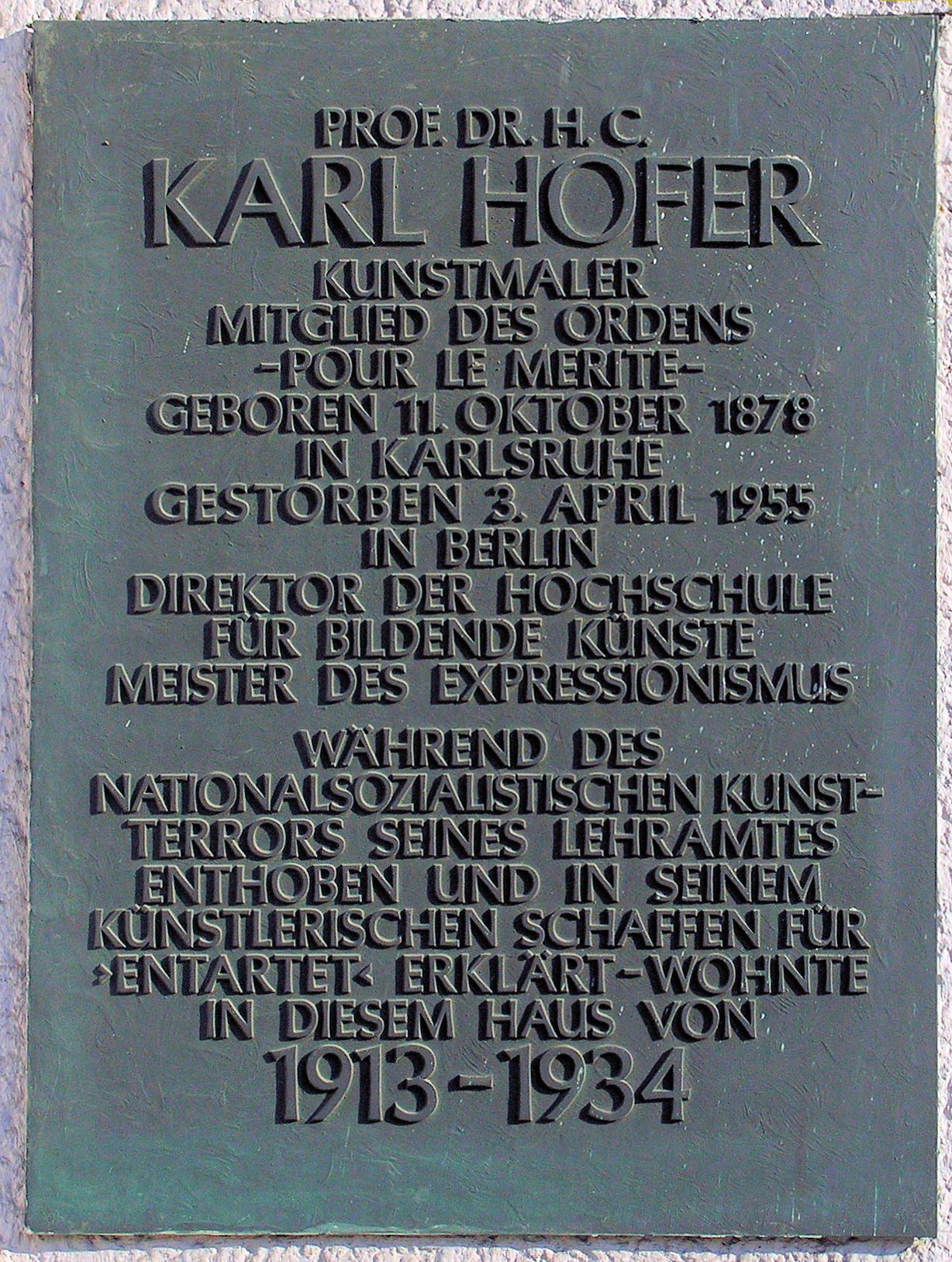
Memorial plaque at Grunewaldstraße 44 in Berlin-Schöneberg

Karl Christian Ludwig Hofer or Carl Hofer (11 October 1878 – 3 April 1955) was a German expressionist painter. He was director of the Berlin Academy of Fine Arts.

One of the most prominent painters of expressionism, he never was a member of one of the expressionist groups, like "Die Brücke", but still was influenced by their artists. His work was among those considered degenerate art by the Nazis, but after World War II he regained recognition as one of the leading German painters.

== Life ==
=== Early years and career (1878–1920) ===
Hofer was born in 1878 in Karlsruhe. Four weeks after his birth, his father, the military musician Karl Friedrich Hofer, died of a lung disease. Since his mother Ottilie had to earn a living, Karl was housed in 1879 with two great aunts, before he went to live in an orphanage (1884-1892). At the age of 14 Karl began a bookshop apprenticeship, which he completed three years later. In 1896 he met the three years younger German philosopher Leopold Ziegler.

In 1897 Hofer began studying painting at the Art Academy of Karlsruhe. His talent was recognized early, he received a scholarship from the fund of the Grand Duke of Baden. After the appointment of the painter Hans Thoma to the Karlsruhe Academy of Art, in 1899, Hofer became his pupil. In the same year he had his first stay in Paris. In the year of his second stay in Paris in 1900 he made the acquaintance of Julius Meier-Graefe. Hofer became a student of Thoma in 1901 and a year later a student of the painter Leopold von Kalckreuth at the State Academy of Fine Arts in Stuttgart. During this time he began his friendship with the sculptor Hermann Haller.

In 1903, Karl Hofer and Mathilde Scheinberger married in Vienna. Mathilde belonged to a Jewish family, but was not educated in the Jewish faith and later joined the Protestant church. The couple had three sons, Karl Johannes Arnold, called Carlino, born in 1904, Titus Wolfgang, born in 1905, who died in 1906, and Hans-Rudi, born in 1911.

In 1902 Hofer concluded a five-year contract with the Swiss entrepreneur and patron Theodor Reinhart, in which it was agreed a regular support. In return, Reinhart received each year at first three and later four paintings by Hofer. The contract was later extended by five years until 1913. Reinhart's scholarship enabled Karl and Mathilde to move to Rome. From 1908 to 1913 the Hofer family lived in Paris, and in 1913 they moved to Berlin. During his residence in Paris, he was very influenced by Paul Cézanne and by Pablo Picasso, specially his early period.

Since 1905, Hofer's paintings had been regularly shown at exhibitions. In 1908 he was represented at the exhibition of the "Berlin Secession", founded by Max Liebermann. In Berlin, Hofer became a member of the new "Freie Secession" in 1913 and was represented at its first exhibition in 1914, together with Max Liebermann, and German Expressionist painters Erich Heckel, Ernst Ludwig Kirchner, Max Pechstein and Karl Schmidt-Rottluff. Hofer traveled to India in 1910 and 1911. During the summer of 1914, during a stay in the French seaside resort of Ambleteuse, the Hofers were surprised by the outbreak of World War I and were interned because of their citizenship. Mathilde and the sons were eventually allowed to return to Germany at the end of 1914. Hofer was dismissed by the mediation of Reinhart in 1917, and moved to Switzerland, first to Churwalden, then to Zürich.

After the end of the war, Hofer returned to his family in Berlin, in 1919. In 1920 he was appointed to the College of Fine Arts in Charlottenburg, and in 1921 he was appointed professor. The College of Fine Arts was merged in 1924 with the Arts and Crafts Museum to form the United State Schools of Free and Applied Arts. In recognition for his services as an artist and as a professor, Hofer was admitted to the Prussian Academy of Arts in 1923. Between the art movements of the twenties, Hofer represented his own style, which was later referred to as "Magic Realism". Hofer's paintings were represented in many museums. In 1928 he was invited to the International Art Exhibition of the Carnegie Institute in Pittsburgh, Pennsylvania in the United States.

=== Middle period and mature career (1933–1945) ===
At the beginning of the twenties, Karl Hofer had a relationship with Elisabeth Schmidt, whom he had met as a model. In the summer of 1926 he had a short-term love affair with Ruth Wenger. Since 1927 Karl and Mathilde lived separately but remained married.

Hofer had been opposed to Nazism even before they reached power. In 1931 he was attacked in the Nazi press, with claims that he was Jewish. In the same year he wrote articles against Nazism, "Faschismus, die dunkle Reaktion!" ("Fascism, the dark reaction!") and "Wie kämpfen wir gegen ein Drittes Reich?" ("How do we fight against a Third Reich?"), published at the Communist newspaper Welt am Abend. In the article he argued for a nonpartisan initiative against the NSDAP. On April 1, 1933 Hofer was defamed in a poster together with Oskar Schlemmer and other teachers of the Berlin Art Academy as "representatives of the decomposing liberal-Marxist-Jewish alliance". He was then on a leave and was dismissed from teaching in the summer of 1934. At the beginning of Nazi Germany, Hofer still tried to conciliate his art with the new regimen ideology to a certain extent. Despite his rejection of National Socialism, Hofer believed that his art could be accepted by the regimen, because he understood it as being German. In the exhibition of the Berlin Secession in the summer of 1933, the catalog preface said that German art was expressed in Hofer's painting. At the same time he participated with the article "Der Kampf um die Kunst" ("The struggle for art") in a series of articles on German art in the Deutsche Allgemeine Zeitung. Among other things, he argued that German art was "free of Jews", like no other area of society, except the military. Nevertheless, his work, like other German expressionist painters, was condemned by the regimen as degenerate art.

Hofer was represented with eight works in the Nazi propaganda exhibition "Degenerate Art" held in Munich, in 1937. In 1938 he was expelled from the Prussian Academy of Arts. Because of his marriage with Mathilde, considered a Jew according to the Nazi laws of marriage, despite being a convert to Protestantism, Hofer was threatened with exclusion from the Reich Chamber of the Fine Arts . In July 1938, the couple was divorced. Hofer was expelled from the Reich Chamber of the Fine Arts in October 1938, since the confirmation of the divorce came too late at the Ministry of Propaganda. He was then no longer allowed to sell his works publicly in the art trade or at auctions; the exclusion was therefore considered a professional ban. In November 1938, Hofer married for a second time to Elisabeth Schmidt, considered an "aryan" according to Nazi standards. As a result the ban was lifted and Hofer was reinstated by the President of the Reich Chamber in February 1939.

After the divorce, his ex-wife Mathilde was no longer protected for being in what the Nuremberg Laws called a "privileged mixed marriage", and was deported to the Auschwitz concentration camp, where she was killed on 21 November 1942. His Atelier in Berlin was bombed in March 1943 and completely destroyed with many of his works, in November 1943. The apartment where he lived with Elisabeth Hofer was also destroyed. His son Carlino would be killed in an assault in 1947.

=== The final years (1945–1955) ===
After the end of World War II, Hofer was involved in the construction of the Berlin Academy of Fine Arts, whose director he became in July 1945. He regained his artistic prestige once again in the post-war Germany. He received an honorary doctorate from the University of Berlin in 1948. He was also awarded the Order Pour le mérite for Science and Arts in 1952, and the Great Cross of the Order of Merit of the Federal Republic of Germany in 1953. Hofer published two autobiographical books, Aus Leben und Kunst (Of Life and Art), in 1952, and "Erinnerungen eines Malers" (A Painter's Memories), in 1953.

Hofer was involved in a public dispute with the art critic Will Grohmann on figuration and abstraction. The controversy led Ernst Wilhelm Nay, Willi Baumeister and Fritz Winter, to withdraw from the Deutscher Künstlerbund. Hofer planned to publish the treatise Über das Gesetzliche in der bildenden Kunst (On the Lawful in Fine Art), on the controversy, because in the same year, at the climax of the dispute, he suffered a stroke, from which he succumbed later. Hofer died in Berlin on 3 April 1955, aged 76 years old.

Some of his works were shown posthumously at documenta 1 in Kassel, in 1955. Hofer's importance for post-war German painting lies in his insistence that the antinomy between figurative and abstract painting was nonsensical. For him, the "distinction of value between representational and nonrepresentational appeared as a senseless absurdity."

== Art market ==
The highest selling painting by the artist was Arbeitslose (Unemployed) (1932), who sold by €817,000 ($874,190), at Ketterer Kunst, on 11 December 2020.

== Works ==
=== Early work, 1898–1920 ===
- 1901: Betende Kinder (Praying Children), Oil on Canvas, Private Collection, Karlsruhe, Germany
- 1903: Karl und Thilde Hofer (Karl and Thilde Hofer), Oil on Canvas, Former Hofer Estate, Berlin, Germany
- 1907: Drei Badende Jünglinge (Three Young Bathers), Oil on Canvas, The Winterthur Museum of Art, Winterthur, Switzerland
- 1911: Im Sturm (By Storm), Oil on Canvas, The Winterthur Museum of Art, Winterthur, Switzerland
- 1913: Selbstbildnis (Self Portrait), Oil on Canvas, Bavarian State Picture Collection, Munich, Germany
- 1913: Fahnenträger (Flagbearer), Oil on Canvas, Municipal Art Gallery, Mannheim, Germany
- 1914: Im Meersand (In the Sand), Oil on Canvas, State Art Gallery, Karlsruhe, Germany
- 1918: Bildnis Theodor Reinhart (Portrait of Theodor Reinhart), Oil on Canvas, Volkhart Brothers, Winterthur, Switzerland

=== Middle period, 1920–1933 ===
- 1922: Maskerade oder Drei Masken (Masquerade or Three Masks), Oil on Canvas, Wallraf-Richartz Museum, Cologne, Germany
- 1922/1923: Freundinnen (Girlfriends), Oil on Canvas, Kunsthalle Hamburg, Hamburg, Germany
- 1924: Große Tischgesellschaft (Large Dinner Party), Oil on Canvas, The Winterthur Museum of Art, Winterthur, Switzerland
- 1924: Der Rufer (The Caller), Oil on Canvas, New Masters Gallery, Dresden, Germany
- 1925: Still life National Museum of Serbia, Belgrade, Serbia
- 1926: Zwei Freunde (Two Friends), Oil on Canvas, Städel, Frankfurt am Main, Germany
- 1928: Großer Karneval (Big Carnival), Oil on Canvas, Bavarian State Picture Collection, Munich, Germany
- 1928: Yellow Dog Blues, Oil on Canvas, Private Collection
- 1930: Selbstbildnis mit Dämonen (Self Portrait with Demons), Oil on Canvas, Former Hofer Estate, Berlin, Germany

=== Mature work, 1933–1945 ===
- 1933: Gefangene (Prisoner), Oil on Canvas, Berlinische Galerie, Berlin, Germany
- 1935: Frühe Stunde (Early Hour), Oil on Canvas, Portland Art Museum, Portland, USA
- 1935: Turmbläser (Trumpeters), Oil on Canvas, Former Hofer Estate, Berlin, Germany
- 1936: Agnuzzo – Italienische Landschaft (Agnuzzo – Italian Landscape), Oil on Canvas, The Detroit Institute of Arts, Detroit, USA
- 1937: Mann in Ruinen (Man in Ruins), Oil on Canvas, Staatliche Kunstsammlungen Kassel, Kassel, Germany
- 1943: Die Schwarzen Zimmer (2. Fassung) (The Black Rooms, 2nd version), Oil on Canvas, Neue Nationalgalerie, Berlin, Germany
- 1944: Der Brief (The Letter), Oil on Canvas, Private Collection
- 1944: Schwarzmondnacht (Black Moon), Oil on Canvas, Former Hofer Estate, Cologne, Germany

=== Late work, 1945–1955 ===
- 1947: Höllenfahrt (Descent into Hell), Oil on Canvas, Former Hofer Estate, Cologne, Germany
- 1947: Ruinennacht (Night of Ruin), Oil on Canvas, Former Hofer Estate, Cologne, Germany
- 1948: Schwarzmond (2. Fassung)(Black Moon, 2nd version, Oil on Canvas, Former Hofer Estate, Cologne, Germany
- 1950: Im Gestein (In Rock), Oil on Canvas, Private Collection, Southern Germany
- 1951: Zwei Frauen (Doppelportrait), (Two Women) (Double Portrait), Oil on Cardboard, Private Collection, Cologne, Germany
- 1954: Zwei Masken (Two Masks), Oil on Canvas, Former Hofer Estate
- 1954: Drei Mädchen zwischen Leitern (Three Girls between Conductors), Oil on Canvas, Private Collection, Cologne, Germany
- 1954: Vater und Tochter (Father and Daughter), Oil on Canvas, Private Collection, Cologne, Germany

== Literature ==
- Karl Hofer: Über das Gesetzliche in der bildenden Kunst. Ed. Kurt Martin. Berlin 1956.
- Karl Hofer: Erinnerungen eines Malers. München 1963.
- Christine Fischer-Defoy (ed.. Karl-Hofer-Gesellschaft): Ich habe das Meine gesagt! – Reden und Stellungnahmen von Karl Hofer zu Kunst, Kultur und Politik in Deutschland 1945–1955. Berlin 1995.
- Daniel Kupper (ed.): Karl Hofer – Schriften. Berlin 1995.
- Ernst Rathenau: Karl Hofer – Das graphische Werk. Berlin 1969.
- Katherine Rigby: Karl Hofer. New York/London 1976.
- Elisabeth Furler (ed.): Karl Hofer – Leben und Werk in Daten und Bildern. Frankfurt am Main 1978.
- Elisabeth Hofer-Richold, Ursula Feist und Günther Feist: Karl Hofer. Berlin 1983.
- Renate Hartleb: Karl Hofer. Leipzig 1987.
- Ursula Feist und Günther Feist (ed.): Karl Hofer – Theodor Reinhart. Maler und Mäzen. Ein Briefwechsel in Auswahl. Berlin 1989.
- Jürgen Schilling: Karl Hofer. Unna 1991.
- Karl Bernhard Wohlert: Werkverzeichnis Karl Hofer. Karl-Hofer-Dokumentation. 3 Bände. VAN HAM Art Publications.
- Hans Gerhard Evers (ed.): Darmstädter Gespräch – Das Menschenbild in unserer Zeit. Darmstadt 1951.
- Ausstellungskatalog: In Memoriam Will Grohmann – Wegbereiter der Moderne. Stuttgart 1987/1988.
- Ausstellungskatalog: Abstraktion und Figuration. Galerie Pels-Leusden. Berlin 1989.
