= Vladimir Horbowski =

German musician

- Born: Wladimir Horbowski-Zaranek; 19 January 1905; Tbilisi, Georgia
- Died: 28 February 1989 (aged 84)
- Education: Royal Conservatory of Brussels
- Occupations: Pianist; Music educator

Wladimir Horbowski-Zaranek (19 January 1905 – 28 February 1989) was a Russian Empire-born German pianist and music educator.

== Career ==
Horbowski-Zaranek (known in Germany simply as Vladimir Horbowski) was born in Tbilisi into a family of Polish and Ukrainian-Georgian nobles who left Russia and went into exile in Brussels in 1921 after the October Revolution. After studying at the Royal Conservatory of Brussels, he moved to Berlin, and was a pupil and assistant of Leonid Kreutzer. He was part of the circle of Ferruccio Busoni, which included Rachmaninoff. He later explained that he owed his most lasting artistic inspiration to these people.

A highly gifted pianist in his youth, an accident denied Horbowski a career as a concert pianist, and he turned to the educational work. After Kreutzer was driven from his teaching post by the Nazi government in 1933 and emigrated to Japan, Horbowski took over the piano class at the Berlin Conservatory. From 1934 to 1945 Horbowski also headed piano classes at the Berlin Klindworth-Scharwenka Conservatory. He developed a teaching method that inspired his students to focus on learning the work by heart, and to concentrate primarily on phrasing, dynamics, pedaling and accurate attention to the score. He also pioneered a kind of finger movements which allowed to play complex pieces with lesser technical effort.

After World War II, Horbowski took a position as professor of piano at the Musikhochschule in Stuttgart.

He taught material from Bartok's Mikrokosmos to concert literature. Pianists from around the world came to Stuttgart, to learn under his guidance the art of piano playing from a different angle. Numerous students won international competitions and awards, are known as concert pianists and are teaching at conservatories and music schools. Horbowski served several times on the jury of the Queen Elisabeth Music Competition in Brussels, one of the world's most important music competitions.

After his retirement, Horbowski moved to Munich, where he served as a teacher and adviser to many pianists. He died at the age of 85 after a long illness.
