= Ming-Qiang Li =

Ming-Qiang Li 李名強
- Genres: Classical
- Occupation(s): Pianist, professor
- Instrument: Piano
- Years active: 1950s–present

Li Ming-Qiang (Chinese: 李名強, also spelled Li Min-Chan) - is a Chinese classical pianist. He studied under Alfred Wittenberg and Tatiana Kravchenko, and as a young pianist in the late 1950s and early 1960s won awards at several Eastern European music competitions: the Smetana Competition in Prague in 1957 (3rd prize), the George Enescu International Piano Competition in Bucharest in 1958 (1st prize), the VI International Chopin Piano Competition in Warsaw in 1960 (4th prize). His recordings comprise pieces by the classics and romantics, as well as piano music by Chinese composers.

In 1984 Li Ming-Qiang became Vice President of the Shanghai Conservatory of Music (1984–1989), a professor of piano, and Chairman of the Shanghai Piano Association. He served as a juror at many international piano competitions, among others those of Paloma O'Shea Santander International Piano Competition, Van Cliburn in Fort Worth, Enescu in Bucharest, Chopin in Warsaw, as well as in Sydney, Shanghai, Paris and Montreal. In 1989 he relocated temporarily to the USA, where he held master classes at several music centers. In 1997 he moved to Hong Kong and became a professor in the Music and Arts Department at the Baptist University in Hong Kong. Despite his relatively short performing-career, Li Ming-Qiang is ranked among the influential contemporary classical pianists (recorded).

Li is currently the Chief Music Consultant at Parsons Music Limited.
