= Heinrich Grünfeld =

Austrian cellist and composer (1855–1931)

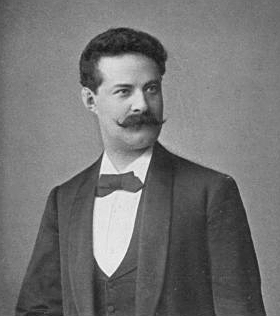
Grünfeld in the 1890s

Heinrich Grünfeld (21 April 1855 – 26 August 1931) was a Czech-Austrian cellist, music educator and composer. He published his autobiography, 'In Dur und Moll' in 1923, an historically important source for Brahms, Joachim, and Richard Strauss. He is the brother of pianist and composer Alfred Grünfeld.

== Early life ==
Heinrich Grünfeld was born on 21 April 1855 into an affluent Jewish family in Prague, the son of merchant Moritz Grünfeld (1817, Kolín – 1882, Vienna) and his wife Regina, née Pick (1826, Dobruška – 1881, Vienna). After the discovery of his elder brother Alfred's musical talent, the family home became a key part of Prague's music scene. Grünfeld thus became acquainted with many of the prominent Czech musicians of the time, including Bedřich Smetana, Antonín Dvořák and David Popper, with the latter of whom he became close friends. Popper later dedicated two Spanish dances to Grünfeld.

Grünfeld studied the cello from the age of fourteen, first with Alois Neruda and then with Frantisek Hegenbarth at the Prague Conservatory, graduating in 1873, where he was a contemporary of Hanuš Wihan, Karel Halíř, Otakar Ševčík and Florián Zajíc. Three of Grünfeld's four brothers also went on to have careers in the music industry: Alfred as a famous pianist in Vienna, Siegmund as a repetiteur at the Royal Court Opera, and Ludwig as an agent.

== Life ==
After graduation, Grünfeld toured Bohemia before taking a job in Vienna at the Komische Oper (later known as the Ringtheater). He remained in Vienna for two years, living with his two elder brothers, until leaving the Komische Oper following the appointment of Wilhelm Hasemann as director.

In December 1875, Grünfeld moved to Berlin. His first job was with the Berliner Symphoniekapelle under the direction of Ludwig von Brenner, and he also took an engagement with the Kroll Opera House. Grünfeld taught at Theodor Kullak's Neue Akademie der Tonkunst from 1876 to 1884, and in 1878 he founded a popular series of subscription concerts in the Singakademie, initially with Xaver Scharwenka and Gustav Hollaender. Hollaender was subsequently replaced on the violin by Émile Sauret and then Florián Zajíc, and Scharwenka by a series of rotating pianists. Grünfeld celebrated the fiftieth anniversary of these concerts in 1928.

In 1886, Grünfeld was appointed court violoncellist to King William of Prussia.

Grünfeld can be heard in an arrangement of Mendelssohn's Song Without Words op. 53, no. 2, together with violinist Alfred Wittenberg and pianist Moritz Mayer-Mahr, on acoustic Parlophon P 1736-I. These three artists toured widely as members of an established piano trio.

== Personal life and late life ==
Grünfeld met Adleheid Zimmermann, the daughter of Richard Andree the German geographer and cartographer, at Bayreuth. They remained married until his death. He died in Berlin on 26 August 1931.

== Bibliography ==
  - Hugo Riemann, Musik-Lexikon;
  - Theodore Baker, Biographical Dictionary of Music and Musicians
