= Róża Etkin-Moszkowska =

Polish musician (1908–1945)

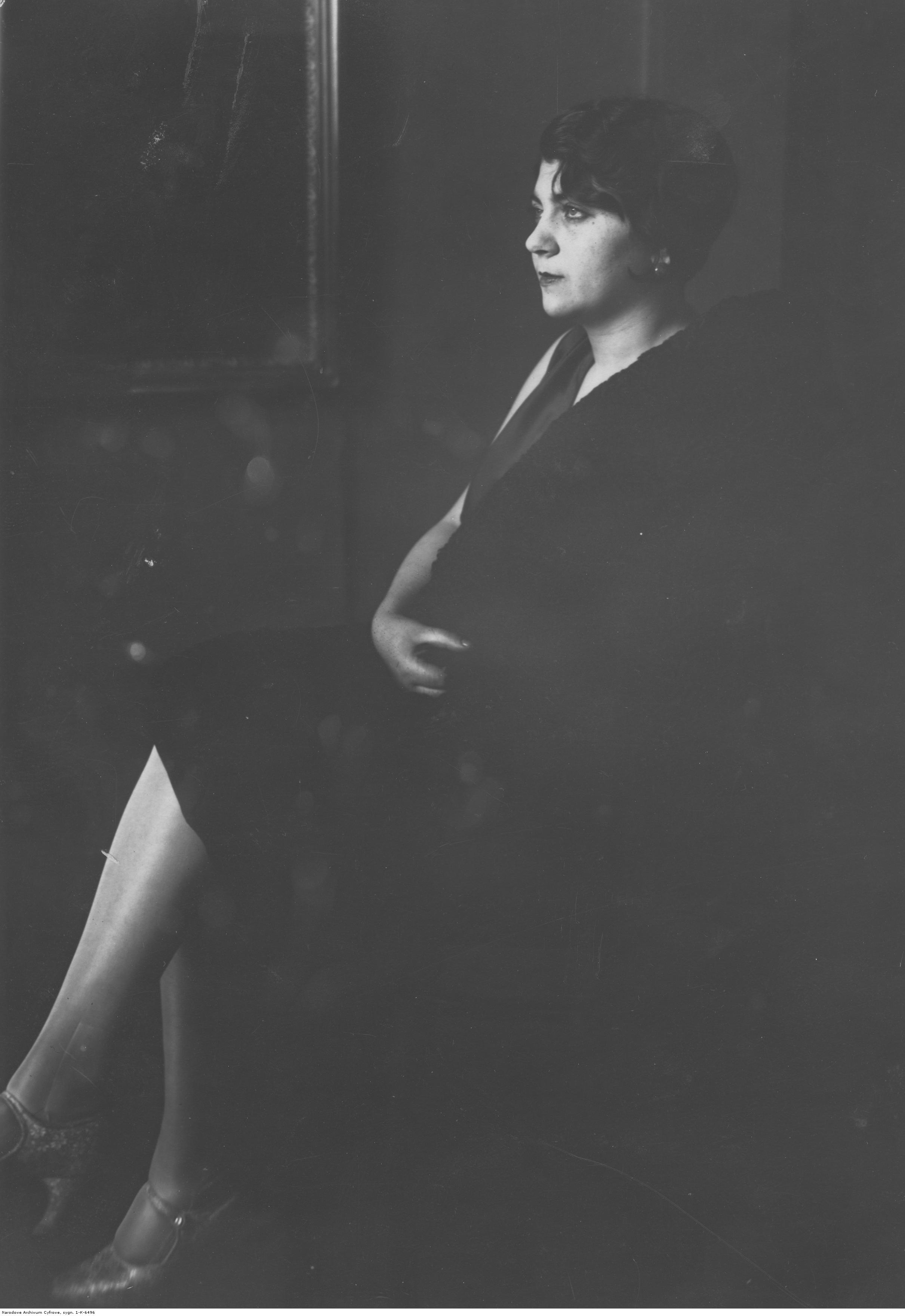
Róża Etkin in 1927

Róża Etkin (1908 in Warsaw – 16 January 1945 in Warsaw), known after marriage as Róża Etkin-Moszkowska, was a Polish pianist.

Etkin, who showed considerable talent early in life, was the youngest contestant at the inaugural I International Chopin Piano Competition, where she was awarded the 3rd prize. She was a pupil of Aleksander Michałowski and Zbigniew Drzewiecki in Warsaw. During the early 1930s she settled in Berlin to study with Professor Moritz Mayer-Mahr. She developed a very large repertoire, including the late sonatas of Beethoven, the Rachmaninov concerti, the Goldberg Variations, Prokofiev's and Karol Szymanowski's works and Godowsky's arrangements of the Chopin Waltzes. She played a good deal of Chopin, and won critical approval for her performance of his first piano concerto (E minor, op. 11). She made several recordings, some produced under the Berlin Tri-Ergon label.

Etkin married Ryszard Moszkowski, nephew of the composer Moritz Moszkowski. Both were murdered by German soldiers at the Żoliborz district in Warsaw. As the German army was retreating from Warsaw a soldier threw a live grenade into a shelter where they and several other people were taking refuge.
