= Gustav Bumcke =

German composer (1876–1963)

Gustav Bumcke (18 July 1876 – 4 July 1963) was a German composer and founder of the first German saxophone orchestra.

== Biography ==
Born on 18 July 1876, in Berlin, after attending the Oberrealschule and subsequent years as a commercial apprentice, Bumcke took lessons in composition with Gustav Kulenkampff (1848–1921), Max Bruch and Engelbert Humperdinck, piano with Hugo Rüdel and Otto Neitzel, and trumpet with Julius Koslek (1835–1905). From 1900 to 1902, he was a theatre director in Constance, Heilbronn and Bayreuth. In 1902, on a trip to Paris, he met the son of Adolphe Sax. Bumcke brought eight saxophones (instruments with the "beautiful, noble sound") of all sizes with him to Berlin and since then devoted all his creative energy to the classical saxophone in Germany.

From 1903 to 1936, he taught music theory, harmony and composition at the Stern Conservatory in Berlin. For lack of good saxophonists, Bumcke played many of his compositions himself and in 1927 founded his own saxophone class at Stern's Conservatory, then later at the Klindworth-Scharwenka Conservatory, from which especially Bumcke's daughter Hilde became famous as a German saxophonist under her stage name Ingrid Larssen. In 1933, he reconciled the National Socialist cultural politicians with the instrument saxophone, which could continue to be used in German dance orchestras.

Together with Sigurd Rascher, Bumcke is considered by experts to be a pioneer of the classical saxophone in Germany.

Bumcke died in Kleinmachnow, on 4 July 1963, aged 86.

== Work ==
For the musician, pedagogue and saxophonist Bumcke, the saxophone was not a jazz instrument, but an instrument that represented for him the optimal tonal combination of woodwind and brass instruments in chamber music - entirely in the spirit of its inventor Adolphe Sax. As early as 1902, he used the saxophone in his Great Symphony in E-flat Major, Op. 15. More than forty compositions for saxophone followed in all genres of instrumental music - from the sonata to the quartet to the concerto for saxophone and orchestra. In 1926, Bumcke published his "Saxophon-Schule", the first German-language methodology. To go with it, he also wrote a five-volume series of saxophone études (Opus 43).

At the end of the 1920s, he founded the first German saxophone orchestra consisting of one sopranino, two soprano saxophones, seven alto saxophones, three tenor saxophones, one baritone saxophone and one bass saxophone. From 1932, Bumcke appeared with his saxophone quartet in the line-up with Emil Manz (alto saxophone), Ingrid Larssen (alto saxophone), Carl Petzelt (tenor saxophone). Bumcke himself played baritone saxophone in the quartet. The Berlin Saxophon Quartett soon became a fixture of Berlin concert life.

From 1950 to 1955, Bumcke was a lecturer in music theory at the Hochschule für Musik "Hanns Eisler" in East Berlin.

== Legacy ==
Gustav Bumcke's legal successor is the Berlin publishing house Ries & Erler, which handed over all manuscripts and printed music as well as manuscripts and catalogues raisonnés to the archive of the Academy of Arts, Berlin. Gustav Bumcke's estate was catalogued there and has since been accessible to the public.

== Publications ==
- Saxophon-Schule. Anton J. Benjamin, Leipzig, 1926
- Das Saxofon als Orchesterinstrument. In Musik und Gesellschaft, 8, Henschelverlag, Berlin 1960, pp. 478–479
