= Hans-Erich Riebensahm =

German classical pianist and music educator

Hans-Erich Riebensahm (24 June 1906 in Königsberg – 15 October 1988 in Berlin) was a German classical pianist and music educator.

== Life ==
As a pupil of Artur Schnabel, Riebensahm was a proven Beethoven player. He often included Paul Hindemith and the forgotten Hans-Georg Burghardt in his program. In 1955, at Königsberg's 700th anniversary celebration in Duisburg he played the Nature Trilogy by Heinz Tiessen and - as world premiere - the Piano Sonata in a Movement by Otto Besch. In 1949 he became professor at the Berlin University of the Arts. There Peter Ronnefeld and Theodor Breu was one of his students. Riebensahm was Liedbegleiter (accompanist) by Dietrich Fischer-Dieskau. He played works by Beethoven, Schumann and Liszt as a soloist between 1956 and 1972 in twelve subscription concerts of the Deutsches Symphonie-Orchester Berlin conducted by Carl August Bünte.

== Bibliography ==
- Hugo Riemann's Musiklexikon, 12th edition, vol. 2, p. 504. Mainz 1961
- August Ludwig Degener, Walter Habel: Wer ist wer? Das deutsche Who's Who, volume 16,. Arani, Berlin, 1970, ISBN 3-7605-2007-3, p. 1045.
- Christine Fischer-Defoy: Hannah Arendt: das private Adressbuch 1951–1975. Koehler & Amelang, Leipzig, 2007, ISBN 3-7338-0357-4, p. 187.
