= Hans Hermann =

German classical composer (1870–1931)

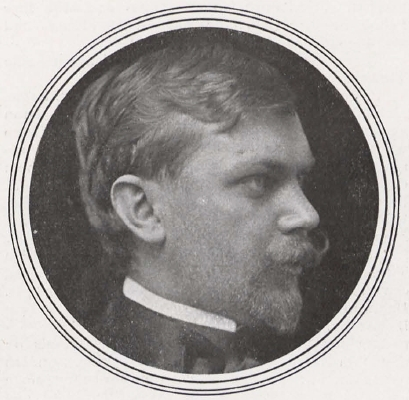
Hans Hermann in 1902

Hans Hermann (17 August 1870 – 18 May 1931) was a German composer mostly known for his Lieder, a double-bassist and music educator.

== Life ==
Hans Hermann was born in Leipzig. He studied with Wilhelm Rust, Edmund Kretschmer and Heinrich von Herzogenberg and worked from 1888 to 1893 as a double-bassist in various orchestras in Germany. From 1901 to 1907 he was active as a teacher at the Klindworth-Scharwenka Conservatory. Afterwards, he lived as a freelance composer in Dresden and from 1927 in Berlin. He mostly composed Lieder and chamber music, which were sung by notable performers, such as Lilian Sanderson, Lilli Lehmann, and Karl Mayer.

The musicologist Hermann Kretzschmar characterised the style of his compositions as strong in structure, especially wider forms, clear and interesting groupings, and a unique and characteristic way of mixing liveliness with great passion.

He died in Berlin and is buried at the Stahnsdorf South-Western Cemetery.

== Works (selection) ==
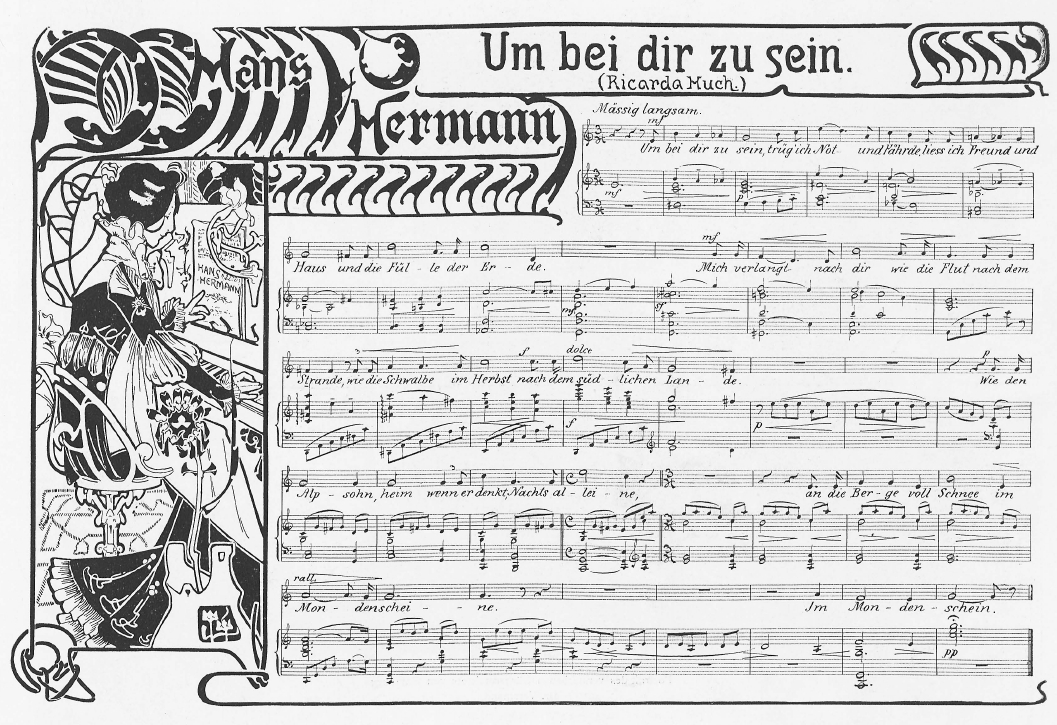
Decorated sheet music for the Lied "Um bei dir zu sein", lyrics by Ricarda Huch

- Lieder
  - "Salome"
  - "Drei Wanderer"
  - "Alte Landsknechte"
  - "Sinnsprüche des Omar Khajjam", Op. 60
- Two string quartets (G minor, C major)
- Comic operas
  - Das Urteil des Midas, Berlin 1904
  - Der rote Pimpernell
- Symphony in D minor
