= Anna Suszczynska =

Polish composer

Anna Suszczynska (1877 – August 1931) was a Polish composer, pianist and music educator who established music schools in Poznan and in Binghamton, New York.

Suszczynska was born in Poznan. She studied music at the Klindworth-Scharwenka Conservatory in Berlin, and in New York. Polish piano virtuoso Ignacy Jan Paderewski praised her performances.

After studying music in New York, Susczcynska returned to Poznan to establish and direct a music school. Back in New York through at least 1922, she established another music school in Binghamton. She presented solo piano recitals and also accompanied soprano Minna Kaufmann Ruud and other singers. Suszczynska died in Poznan in August 1931.

Suszczynska's compositions included:

== Orchestra ==
- Piano Concerto in e minor
- War Symphony

== Piano ==
- Polish Dance
- Valse d’Amour
- War Symphony (piano arrangement)

== Vocal ==
- “Give Us Peace, Oh Lord”
- “Lullaby”
- “Spring”
