= Fritz Büchtger =

German composer

Fritz Büchtger (14 February 1903 – 26 December 1978) was a German composer.

== Life ==
Born in Munich, Büchtger studied at the Music Academie of Munich with Eberhard Schwickerath, Hermann Wolfgang von Waltershausen and Anton Beer-Walbrunn.

In March 1927, together with the young pianists Udo Dammert and Franz Dorfmüller, who were later joined by Carl Orff, Werner Egk and other artists, he founded the Vereinigung für zeitgenössische Musik (Association for Contemporary Music), which performed approximately one hundred and seventy works by contemporary composers in Munich. Under the direction of Büchtger and the conductor Hermann Scherchen (1891–1966), who acted as the spiritual leader, this institution held four "Festwochen für Neue Musik" in particular until its end in 1932, in addition to the large number of individual concerts.

In 1948 Büchtger became director of the Studio for New Music and the Youth Music School in Munich. Since 1963 he was president of the German section of Jeunesses Musicales International. In the three decades after the Second World War, he organized ten music festivals and about seven hundred concerts, presenting two thousand eight hundred works of modern music.

In addition to an opera, an orchestral concerto and a violin concerto, Büchtger composed three sacred oratorios, church cantatas, Marian hymns, choral music and song cycles.

He received the Schwabing Art Prize in 1977.

Büchtger died in Starnberg at age 75. His grave is located at the Munich Waldfriedhof.

== Publications ==
- Petite sonate : pour violoncelle et piano.
- Die Himmelfahrt Christi : für gemischten Chor und Orchester.
- Fritz Büchtger.
- Le miroir brisé : 4 chansons d'amour.
- Die Verklärung : für Bariton, Frauenstimmen und Streicher : Partitur zugleich Klavierauszug.
