= Télémaque Lambrino =

German pianist and music educator

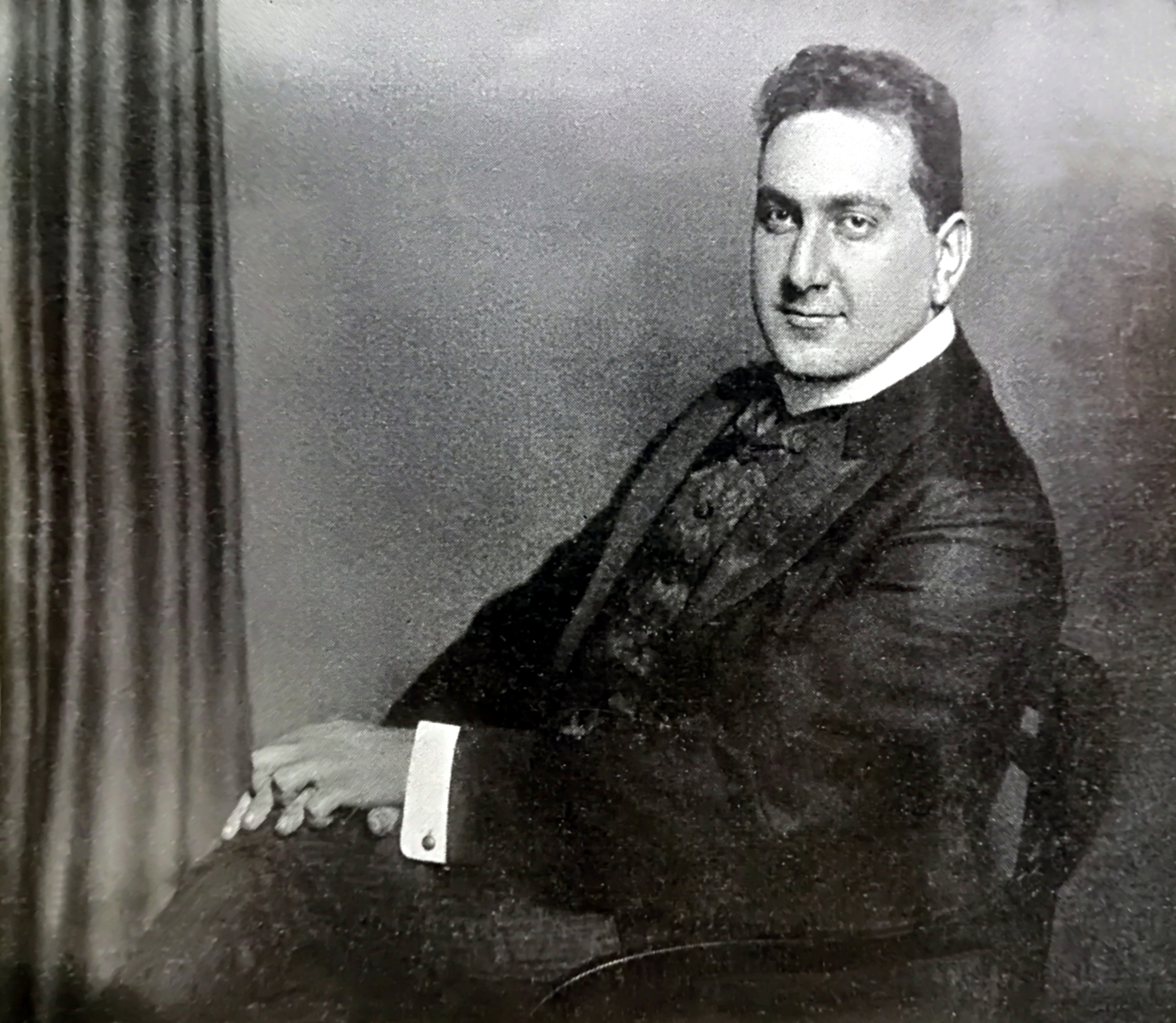
Lambrino c. 1909

Télémaque Lambrino (27 October 1878 – 25 February 1930) was a German pianist and music educator. The son of Greek parents, he lived and worked mainly in Germany.

== Life ==
Born in Odessa, Lambrino first received his musical training with Dmitri Klimow in his native city. Presumably from the winter semester 1898/1899 where he was enrolled for one year at the University of Music and Performing Arts Munich, among others the Liszt's students Berthold Kellermann as well as Anton Beer-Walbrunn and Josef Gabriel Rheinberger were his teachers. At the end of 1899, Lambrino seems to have moved to Leipzig. From here he regularly went to Berlin to continue his studies with Rubinstein's student Maria Teresa Carreño.

Already early on Lambrino took over the direction of his own master classes, both at the Richard Bruno Heydrich Konservatorium für Musik und Theater in Halle (from February 1905, with interruptions until 1915) and at the Thuringian State Conservatory in Erfurt. After a short period of activity at the Moscow Conservatory, which lasted from 1908 to 1909 and was connected with a professorship, Lambrino settled permanently in Leipzig to create better conditions for a career as a soloist. There he gave private lessons to a large circle of students without ever belonging to the University of Music and Theatre Leipzig. From 1918/19 to 1924, Lambrino also taught piano training classes at the Berlin Klindworth-Scharwenka-Konservatorium.

Lambrino developed into one of the most sought-after pianists of his time. Tours have taken the artist all over Europe and to Russia since 1902. Karl Straube characterized Lambrino in an obituary with the words "He can be counted among the most gifted of this century. … Those who come from his school can boast that they have been presented with music that is full of emotion and emotion right down to the last movement".

A Welte-Mignon recording from 1905 of Franz Schubert's Military March in the adaptation by Carl Tausig has been preserved and another one with the Etudes Op. 25 no. 8 and 9 by Frédéric Chopin.

Lambrino died in Leipzig at age 51.
