= Anton Beer-Walbrunn =

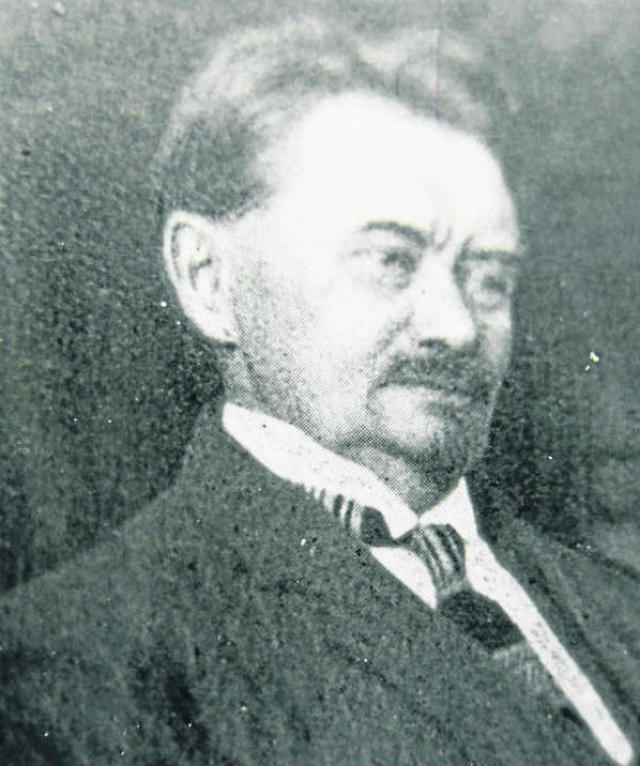
Anton Beer-Walbrunn

Anton Beer-Walbrunn (29 June 1864 – 22 March 1929) was a German composer.

== Life ==
Anton Beer-Walbrunn was born on 29 June 1864 in Kohlberg near Weiden in der Oberpfalz. He was the 4th of five children of the teacher, cantor, sacristan and community writer Anton Beer and his wife Margarethe, née Walbrunn, in the Upper Palatinate Marktgemeinde Kohlberg. His birthplace was demolished in 2019. In 1877 he attended the Regensburg Preparatory School, took the entrance examination for the Dominican Monastery Eichstättand subsequent use teachers' seminar in Eichstätt in 1880, but then changed to the newly founded seminar in Amberg - today the Max-Reger-Gymnasium Amberg - and was one of the first graduates in 1882. In 1886 he passed the final examination as the best of 57 candidates.

His teacher Domkapellmeister Widmann in Eichstätt made a significant contribution to him and enabled him to study in Munich from 1888 to 1891 with Joseph Rheinberger, Hans Bußmeyer (1853–1930), and Ludwig Abel at the Akademie der Tonkunst. In 1901 he was appointed teacher for counterpoint, composition, harmony and piano at the same Royal Academy of Music in Munich (today: Hochschule für Musik und Theater München). In 1908 he was appointed Royal Professor. In 1904 he married the painter Ida Görtz, with whom he has since used the maiden name of his mother, who died at an early age, as a double name Beer-Walbrunn.

Among his students were Télémaque Lambrino, Fritz Büchtger, Alfred Einstein, Carl Orff and Wilhelm Furtwängler as well as the musicologist and critic Eugen Schmitz.

Beer-WalbrunnSein died in Munich on 22 March 1929. His grave is located at the Munich Waldfriedhof.

The Anton Beer-Walbrunn - Kohlberg art and culture association (established June 2015, president Martin Valeske) is holding the "Beer-Walbrunn-Days" in autumn, where his music is performed again. He cooperates with the Markt Kohlberg, the city of Weiden and the district of Oberpfalz.

== Work ==
A. Vocal Music

Songs: There are about 60 of them.

- op. 12 after texts by Ludwig Uhland and Adolf Friedrich von Schack
- op. 13 et al. after Nikolaus Lenau
- op. 24 after Nikolaus Lenau
- op. 27 Songs for voice and piano
- op. 31 The Fugitive, Ballad for baritone and orchestra
- op. 34 Ten "Shakespeare"'s sonnets"
- op. 37 after Annette von Droste-Hülshoff
- op. 39 after Nikolaus Lenau and Ludwig Uhland
- op. 59 Sacred Songs after Eichendorff
- op. 60 after Joseph von Eichendorff
- op. 62a Songbook for high school girls
- op. 62b Songbook for Boys' Middle Schools
- op. 62c Arrangements of Christmas songs for voice, piano, violin and cello
- op. 63 Seven Songs for Voice and Piano

Choral music:

- op. 7 The Air Ghost Song for mixed choir and orchestra
- op. 16 Mahomet's Song for solos, choir, orchestra and organ after Goethe (1895)
- op. 1, 35b, 48, 66, 69 for mixed choir
- op. 35a, 53, 55, 68 for male choir

B. Stage productions:

- op. 10 The Expiation, opera after Theodor Körner, premiere 1894 at Lübeck
- op. 18 Don Quixote, opera after Miguel de Cervantes, premiere 1908 Munich, under Felix Mottl
- op. 41 Sühne, arrangement of the opera op. 10 as Volksoper in one act
- op. 43 Stage music to Hamlet (1909)
- op. 47 arrangement of the opera The three daughters of Cecrop by N. A. Strungk
- op. 50 The Beast, comedy after Anton Chekhov, first performance 1914 Karlsruhe, Court Theatre
- op. 54 incidental music to Shakespeare's Tempest, 2 acts
- op. 64 The Tempest, symbolic fairy tale in 3 acts, incidental music

Instrumental music

Orchestral works:

- op. 2 Concert Overture
- op. 5 Symphony in F minor
- op. 9 Concert Allegro in F sharp minor for violin and orchestra
- op. 11 Symphonic Fantasy D Major "Artist Life"
- op. 22 German Suite
- op. 36 Symphony E Major
- op. 38a Orchestral arrangement of a canzone by Gabrieli
- op. 38b Arrangement of a Gavotte by Schlemüller for violoncello and orchestra
- op. 40 "Cloud Cuckoo's Home", three burlesques
- op. 52 Concerto for violin and orchestra G major
- op. 61 Overture of comedy based on motives from the opera "The Beast"

Chamber music:

- op. 3 Little Fantasy in G minor for violin and piano
- op. 4 String Quartet No. 1 in C major
- op. 6 String Quartet No. 2 in C minor
- op. 8 Piano Quartet F major (premiere with Hans Pfitzner at the piano)
- op. 14 String Quartet No. 3 G Major
- op. 15 Sonata for violoncello and piano G major
- op. 17 Sketch of a piano quintet in G minor
- op. 19 String Quartet No. 4 in E minor
- op. 20 Ode for violoncello and piano G major
- op. 25 Humoresque for string quartet and piano G major
- op. 26 String Quartet No. 5 D minor
- op. 30 Sonata for violin and piano in D minor
- op. 33 Arrangements of six sonatas for violin and harpsichord by Dall'Abaco
- op. 70 Piano Quintet in G minor, arrangement of the sketch op. 17

Piano music:

- op. 21 Travel Pictures, cycle of six piano pieces
- op. 22 Deutsche Suite for four hands for piano and orchestra
- op. 23 Fugue in G minor, march and waltz (four hands)
- op. 42 Three pieces for piano solo as well as violin and piano, including:
- op. 42/2 Variations on "How beautifully the morning star shines"
- op. 56/57 piano pieces
- op. 58 Fantasy Sonata in F sharp minor for piano solo
- op. 67 Three pieces for piano solo

Organ music:

- op. 28 Drei Fugen für die Orgel (1905)
- op. 29 Drei kleine Fugen für die Orgel
- op. 32 Orgelsonate g-Moll (1906)
- op. 45 Kleine Stücke für die Orgel

== Recordings ==
- Anton Beer-Walbrunn – Shakespeare-Sonette und ausgewählte Lieder (Weltersteinspielung 2016). Angelika Huber (soprano), Kilian Sprau (piano). Bayer Records BR 100 390
- Süddeutsche Orgelmusik der Spätromantik. Gerhard Weinberger (Organ). TYXart / BR KLASSIK, TXA15052. Darunter die Orgelfuge über einen gregorianischen Choral op. 29/1. Bestell-Nr. TXA15052
