= Marianne Scharwenka =

German musician (1856–1918)

Marianne Scharwenka (née Stresow, February 25, 1856 – October 24, 1918, Berlin) was a German violinist and composer. She was married to the German composer Philipp Scharwenka.
