= Klindworth-Scharwenka Conservatory =

The Klindworth-Scharwenka Conservatory (German: Klindworth-Scharwenka-Konservatorium) was a music institute in Berlin, established in 1893, which for decades (until 1960) was one of the most internationally renowned schools of music. It was formed from the existing schools of music of Xaver Scharwenka and Karl Klindworth, the Scharwenka-Konservatorium and the Klindworth-Musikschule. The former, with his brother Phillipp, consolidated the two.

== Directors ==
- 1881–1892: Xaver Scharwenka (Scharwenka-Konservatorium)
- 1890–1892: Friedrich Wilhelm Langhans (Scharwenka-Konservatorium)
- 1883–1892: Karl Klindworth (Klindworth-Musikschule)
- 1893–1905: Hugo Goldschmidt
- 1893–1917: Philipp Scharwenka
- 1898–1924: Xaver Scharwenka
- 1905–1917: Robert Robitschek
- 1929–?: Max Dawison
- 1937–1954: Walter Scharwenka

== Teachers ==
- Conrad Ansorge
- Wilhelm Berger
- Fritz von Borries
- Sergei Bortkiewicz
- Gustav Bumcke
- Max Butting
- Hugo van Dalen
- Hanns Eisler
- Harald Genzmer
- Alfred von Glehn
- Bruno Henze
- Hans Hermann
- Wladimir Horbowski
- Wolfgang Jacobi
- Alberto Jonás
- Hugo Kaun
- Leo Kestenberg
- Walter Kirchhoff
- James Kwast
- Télémaque Lambrino
- Hugo Leichtentritt
- Jacques van Lier
- Moritz Mayer-Mahr
- Florizel von Reuter
- Martin Röder
- Helmut Roloff
- Nino Rossi
- Marie Schmidtlein
- Else Streit
- Alfred Szendrei
- James Simon
- Hans-Joachim Vetter
- Wladimir Vogel

== Students ==
- Siegfried Behrend
- John Victor Bergquist
- Theodor Bohlmann
- Paul Dessau
- Rodolfo Holzmann
- Otto Klemperer
- Margarete Klose
- Max Janowski
- Adalbert Luczkowski
- Rudolf Müller-Chappuis
- Lotar Olias
- Helmut Schmidt
- Jascha Spivakovsky
- Anna Suszczynska
- José Vianna da Motta
