= Edmund Kurtz =

Russian-born cellist (1908–2004)

- Born: 29 December 1908; Saint Petersburg, Russia
- Died: 19 August 2004 (aged 95); London, England
- Occupations: Classical cellist; Music editor
- Organizations: Orchestra of the Bremen Opera; Orchestra of the Prague German Opera; Chicago Symphony Orchestra

Edmund Kurtz (29 December 1908 – 19 August 2004) was a Russian-born cellist and music editor. He was renowned for his "impeccable technique", "innate musicality", and his "rich tone", with a "warm, sensuous quality that seldom loses its luster". In a career spanning 60 years, he performed internationally as a soloist and chamber musician. His edition of Bach's Suites for solo cello, drawn upon facsimiles of the manuscript of Anna Magdalena Bach and showing them opposite each page, is recognized as one of his greatest achievements, and was described as "the most important edition of the greatest music ever written for the instrument".

== Early life and education ==
Edmund Kurtz was born to a musical family in Saint Petersburg on 29 December 1908. In 1917, the year of the Russian Revolution, his family moved to Germany. That same year, Kurtz, aged 9, began to learn the cello. When he was 13, he began studies with Julius Klengel. Klengel later wrote about his pupil: "In spite of his youth, Edmund Kurtz is already one of the most outstanding violoncellists of today ... rarely have I found a pupil who developed so rapidly". He also studied with Leó Weiner in 1924–1925.

== Career ==
In 1924, Kurtz debuted in Rome, and the following year made his debut in Berlin. Both performances were successful and led to solo appearances in the main European cities. In Paris, Pablo Casals recommended Kurtz to continue his studies with Diran Alexanian.

From 1926 to 1927, Kurtz was the principal cellist of the Bremen Opera orchestra, and from 1932 to 1936 the principal cellist of the Prague German Opera orchestra under George Szell. He then moved to the United States, where he served as the principal cellist of the Chicago Symphony Orchestra. He then also played in a piano trio formation, the Spivakovsky Trio, with violinist Tossy Spivakovsky and his brother Jascha as the pianist, touring internationally.

In 1944, Kurtz relinquished his post in Chicago to focus on his solo career. His first American appearance as soloist was in Dvořák's Cello Concerto with the NBC Symphony Orchestra under Arturo Toscanini in 1945. This performance was recorded live, and remains Toscanini's only recording of the concerto. Other recordings include the Cello Sonata of Sergei Rachmaninoff with William Kapell, which received praise by Tim Page of The Washington Post, and Prokofiev's Cello Sonata with Artur Balsam, which was the first recording of the work.

Kurtz often played a Stradivari cello from 1724, named the "Hausmann", after Robert Hausmann, the cellist of Joseph Joachim's string quartet. He played several premieres of compositions dedicated to him, including Ernst Krenek's Suite for cello solo, Op. 84, Alberto Ginastera's Pampeana No. 2, and Darius Milhaud's Élégie, Op. 251, and Cello Concerto No. 2, which he performed with the New York Philharmonic conducted by Artur Rodziński in November 1946. He was the soloist in the first American performance of Khatchaturian's Cello Concerto, with Serge Koussevitzky conducting the Boston Symphony Orchestra in 1948.

In later years, Kurtz began prolifically producing new editions of cello repertoire. Widely considered the most important of these editions is that of Bach's six Suites for cello solo, which he based on facsimiles of the manuscripts by Anna Magdalena Bach; Bach's originals did not survive. The edition, which features her manuscripts opposite each printed page, has been considered Kurtz's "most important contribution to the development of the art of the cello". Mary Campbell wrote in her obituary for The Independent that it is "recognised as the most important edition of the greatest music ever written for the instrument".

== Family ==
Kurtz's brother was the conductor Efrem Kurtz. His other siblings included Arved Kurtz, a former head of the New York College of Music, and Mary Kurtz Rosenwald, a former professional violinist and noted philanthropist who was one of the founders of the United Jewish Appeal.

In 1936, Kurtz married Barbara Bellair; the couple had two sons. He died in London on 19 August 2004.
