= Alfred Wittenberg =

German violinist and pianist

Alfred Wittenberg (14 January 1880 – 18 July 1952) was a German violinist, pianist and music educator.

== Life ==
Born in Breslau, Wittenberg was born into a Jewish family. As a wunderkind, the ten-year-old performed in a concert with a violin concerto by Mendelssohn and a piano concerto by Chopin. He studied at the Berlin University of the Arts with Joseph Joachim. In 1901, he received the Felix Mendelssohn Bartholdy Prize (with a scholarship) for violin. He played in the Staatskapelle Berlin of the Staatsoper Unter den Linden in Berlin.

As a violinist, Wittenberg was a member of piano trios with Frederic Lamond and Joseph Malkin, with Anton Hekking and Artur Schnabel (later Clarence Adler) and with Heinrich Grünfeld and Moritz Mayer-Mahr. In 1921, John Fernström studied with him.

After the Machtergreifung by the Nazis, Wittenberg lived in Dresden, where the Jüdischer Kulturbund organised numerous musical activities. Wittenberg founded a piano trio there with Walter Goldmann and Paul Blumenfeld .

In 1939, Wittenberg managed to emigrate to Shanghai with his wife and mother-in-law. He was given the opportunity to organise a musical evening with two Jewish musicians, through which he became famous and got pupils. In 1941, before the outbreak of the Pacific War, a student offered him a life in the USA with good job opportunities, house and car, but Wittenberg wanted to stay in Shanghai. After the occupation of Shanghai by the Japanese he had to move with his family to a very limited accommodation in the "isolation zone" for Jews. After the war he taught at the Shanghai Conservatory of Music of the Central Conservatory of Music.

Wittenberg died of a heart attack after collapsing while playing the violin in Shanghai at the age of 72.

The film director Chen Yifei portrayed the Jewish colony in Shanghai and especially Alfred Wittenberg in his documentary Escape to Shanghai (1999), in which other main characters were Wittenberg's students, the pianist Ming-Qiang Li and the Austrian violinist Heinz Grünberg.
