= Jascha Spivakovsky =

Background information
- Born: August 18, 1896; Kiev, Kiev Governorate, Russian Empire (modern Ukraine)
- Died: March 23, 1970 (aged 73) Melbourne, Australia
- Genre: Classical
- Occupation: Musician
- Instrument: Piano
- Website: https://www.jascha.com

Jascha Spivakovsky (18 August 1896 – 23 March 1970) was a 20th-century Russian-born Australian pianist. He was born near Kiev, later moving to Odessa, where he and his family were nearly murdered by Imperial Guards during the 1905 pogrom. He fled to Berlin and was declared the heir to Anton Rubinstein, a 19th-century Russian pianist, while being likened to Ignacy Paderewski and Teresa Carreño before he was imprisoned as an enemy alien of Imperial Russia during World War I. In the interwar period, he became internationally recognized as one of the greatest pianists in the world and was regarded in Europe as one of the finest living interpreters of Brahms.

He also formed a trio that toured Europe with success across the continent. He fled to Australia a few days before the Nazi seizure of power and put his musical career on hold to help people escape the Third Reich. After World War II, he returned to the stage. Critics after the war commented on the power, depth and maturity of his interpretations. Although his fame dimmed after he ceased touring due to his lack of commercial studio recordings, a collection of his live recordings was released in 2015.

== Musical biography ==
=== Early life ===
Jascha Spivakovsky was born in 1896 in a small village near Kiev, Russian Empire, into a 400-year-old line of musicians. He began playing the piano unprompted at three years old; it is said that upon hearing a busker in the street below his family's apartment, he reproduced the melody on the family piano and added a left-hand accompaniment. He was taught by his father until the age of six when the family moved to Odessa so he could receive expert instruction. The following year, he was discovered by Josef Hofmann who arranged an audition with the director of the Moscow Conservatory, Vasily Safonov. Safonov offered to cover his personal tuition at the Conservatory. However, restrictions on Jewish people entering Moscow would have prevented his family from accompanying him, and at seven years old, he was too young to take up this opportunity alone. Instead, he began giving concerts in Odessa and was widely celebrated as a child prodigy. After one sold-out concert, he was presented with a grand piano by the wife of the Governor of Odessa.

The following year, a mob massacred the Odessa Jewish community in the 1905 pogrom, storming Spivakovsky's apartment block and murdering the ground-floor tenant. The Spivakovsky family climbed onto the roof where they could see Cossack Imperial Guards approaching on horseback. Instead of quelling the violence, the guards opened fire on them, narrowly missing Spivakovsky's head. The family hid under straw in the basement of their Polish Catholic landlord for five days. When they emerged, they found all their belongings had been looted, and the grand piano thrown from their fifth-floor balcony and smashed to pieces.

Spivakovsky gave concerts to support his now-penniless family and to save money for them to move to a safer country. In 1907, he played to a full house at the Odessa City Theatre, garnering recognition from Odessa News Section.

He was awarded pupillage at the Klindworth-Scharwenka Conservatory in Berlin, where the faculty included direct students of Franz Liszt and Anton Rubinstein, such as Karl Klindworth and Alberto Jonás. Spivakovsky's development there was overseen by the renowned pedagogue, pianist and ensemble performer Professor Moritz Mayer-Mahr, who later authored the tome Technique of Pianoforte Playing with the official endorsement of Artur Nikisch, Eugen d'Albert, Ferruccio Busoni, Otto Neitzel, Moriz Rosenthal, and Emil von Sauer.

Mayer-Mahr determined that Spivakovsky was now ready to debut as a professional and selected Leipzig as the location for this debut, due to its reputation for having the toughest critics in Europe. Spivakovsky astounded these critics and was hailed as "The New Anton Rubinstein." He then proceeded to tour Europe and performed with leading conductors, including Willem Mengelberg. He also played for the royal families of Germany, Romania, Denmark, Bulgaria, Serbia and Montenegro, and performed a recital in Odessa during a fearsome blizzard. By age fifteen, Spivakovsky was renowned as one of the top young pianists in Europe, with a deep appreciation of the Romantics.

In 1913, he made his London debut at Bechstein Hall and was pronounced "King of the Keyboard" and "reminiscent of Paderewski and Carreño." He was engaged to return to London for concerts at the Queen's Hall and the Royal Albert Hall and a royal performance for Queen Alexandra, but his career froze when World War I broke out and he was imprisoned as a Russian enemy alien in Ruhleben internment camp. All the Klindworth-Scharwenka professors petitioned for his release, and eventually he was paroled on the orders of Kaiser Wilhelm II. He remained under strict military supervision but was allowed to resume performing towards the end of the war.

In late 1918, he commenced an epic series of concerts with the Berlin Philharmonic Orchestra illustrating the historical development of the concerto from Bach to Brahms. This tour de force stamped his reputation as a leading exponent of the great composers. He was engaged for another 40 concerts across Germany and sought by Europe's leading conductors. He then toured Europe with his twelve-year-old brother Tossy, who had debuted as a violin prodigy in Berlin a few years earlier. They were greatly celebrated everywhere and received "rather overwhelming" attention from the public in the streets of Copenhagen after performing for the Danish royal family. The brothers went on to perform as a duo for many years and recorded for Parlophone, becoming renowned for artistic virtuosity, warm expression and perfect unison. One of their chief admirers was the great scientist and amateur violinist Albert Einstein.

=== 1920s ===
In 1920, Spivakovsky returned to Britain He remained there until 1921, when he performed a series of concerts with Sir Henry Wood and the New Queen's Hall Orchestra including his first appearance at the Proms.

In 1922, he made his first tour of Australia, where entire audiences rushed the stage, stormed backstage, chased him through the stage door and surrounded his motor car. He was presented with a laurel wreath by Dame Nellie Melba and he gave the first radio broadcast of a live concert to the Australian public. His tour was much extended until he had given 75 concerts over seven months. At his farewell concert the audience insisted on a record 11 encores.

He then proceeded to New Zealand As in Britain and Australia, his playing aroused scenes of wild enthusiasm. In 1923-24, he appeared again twice at the Proms with Sir Henry Wood and toured across Britain. In 1926, he eloped to Bodenbach with Leonore Krantz, an Australian girl he had met during his tour there in 1922. Their honeymoon on the French Riviera was cut short when a message from Richard Strauss arrived, requesting that Spivakovsky perform his Burleske under his baton with the Vienna Philharmonic Orchestra in just a few weeks' time.

He remained in Vienna and gave a series of recitals there. He was engaged by Hans Knappertsbusch to perform Tchaikovsky's Piano Concerto No. 1. They proceeded to perform the work in Munich and in Magdeburg. He then went on to tour Italy and Spain, and sparked more scenes of enthusiasm. For instance, in Salerno, the entire audience cheered him through the streets from the Opera House to his hotel and would not leave until he gave a final curtain call from the balcony. In 1928, he performed with Furtwangler and Strauss at the Schubert Centennial celebrations in Vienna. In 1929, Spivakovsky boarded a steamer bound for Australia and (perhaps due to his performances at the Schubert Centennial) Australian newspapers heralded that he was now "recognised in Europe as the finest living interpreter of Brahms."

=== 1930s ===
In 1930, the Spivakovsky Trio was born when the brothers were joined by Edmund Kurtz, the personal cellist of Russian prima ballerina Anna Pavlova, who had studied with Pablo Casals. After five months of practising up to 14 hours a day together, Spivakovsky determined they were ready to give their debut and chose The Hague. They then toured Europe and were declared "the best chamber music combination of its kind," "the finest ensemble we have ever heard" and "above the highest praise."

Upon their return to Berlin, Spivakovsky learned that his leading reputation for interpreting Brahms and other German composers had infuriated the Nazis, who began attacking him in their press. When they began disrupting his concerts, he was warned to flee Germany by Richard Strauss in a musically coded message (a few bars of the William Tell Overture, which signify an impending storm, followed by an exclamation mark). He hurriedly arranged an Australasian tour of 70 concerts for the Trio and they boarded the ship a few days before the Nazi seizure of power in 1933.

Sought by the leading Australian music institutions, the trio became faculty at the University of Melbourne and thereby avoided having to return to Germany at the end of their tour. However, for the next five years they were at constant threat of the notorious Dictation Test used by Australian immigration officers to arbitrarily deport Jewish people and others they deemed racially undesirable. To tour outside Australia would risk being disallowed return, and they were increasingly blocked from the international stage by anti-Jewish movements, forced to cancel their 1934 tour of Italy. They were also receiving more and more pleas for help from people desperate to escape Germany, written in euphemisms in order to evade the Nazi censors. Spivakovsky put his touring career on hold and worked tirelessly to convince Great Depression-ravaged employers in Australia and elsewhere to sponsor visas for these people. Although he had made test pressings of solo performances for Parlophone before leaving Europe, he had not yet released solo performances to the public and hence he vanished from international musical circles.

Back in Germany, Hitler placed all musical activities under the control of Joseph Goebbels, Minister of Public Enlightenment and Propaganda. In 1933, Goebbels began implementing policies to destroy and erase from memory the careers of Jewish musicians while fostering the careers of Nazi-approved artists. In 1938, his Ministry publicly announced that Spivakovsky and other leading Jewish musicians had been successfully erased from German culture. That same year Spivakovsky became an Australian citizen and a British subject. During World War II, he gave concerts for allied troops, patriotic funds and charities and served as a volunteer Air Raid Warden. At the end of the war, he was devastated to learn of the death of his younger brother Albert, who had also been a prominent musician in Berlin. After fleeing the Nazis and dodging machine gun fire while carrying his wife through deep snow across the Swiss border, Albert had finally reached safety but succumbed to exposure.

=== Postwar ===
After the war, Spivakovsky returned to his musical career with great seriousness of purpose. His touring followed the winter concert season around the world non-stop for the next 14 years, broadening his reach to the United States, Great Britain, Europe, Canada, Australasia, Israel, India, Singapore and parts of Africa. In the United States he was hailed as a remarkable tonalist, after performing at Carnegie Hall in 1948. He was sought by conductor Pierre Monteux to perform a Brahms concerto due to his leading reputation for Brahms and after five years of clashing tour schedules, they eventually performed the Piano Concerto No. 2 during Monteux's final season with the San Francisco Symphony Orchestra in 1952. In Great Britain, he gave one of the first classical music performances on television in 1952, and his concert performance of Tchaikovsky's Piano Concerto No. 1 with the Hallé Orchestra was selected for broadcast by the BBC during the Coronation of Queen Elizabeth II celebrations in 1953. In Australia, he performed in Britten's Piano Concerto at a State Concert celebrating the coronation and gave premieres of modern works including Bloch's monumental Concerto Symphonique in the world's first recorded performance of the piece.

Spivakovsky continued to teach as a professor at the Melbourne Conservatorium of Music and mentor younger pianists including William Kapell, Julius Katchen and Shura Cherkassky. He also continued to lead the Australian Friends of the Israel Philharmonic Orchestra, which he had founded in the 1930s at the personal request of his friend Bronislaw Huberman. He raised the funds for their first tour of Australia and suggested they engage the young conductor Zubin Mehta. A cultural beacon for international stars visiting Australia from 1933 onwards, he welcomed many friends and colleagues to his stately home Edzell House in Melbourne including Artur Schnabel, Bronisław Huberman, Mischa Elman, Benno Moiseiwitsch, Amelita Galli-Curci, George Szell, Arthur Rubinstein, Victor Borge, Ignaz Friedman, Claudio Arrau, Mindru Katz, Simon Barere, Walter Susskind, William Kapell, Rudolf Firkušný, Gary Graffman, Shura Cherkassky, Julius Katchen, Leonid Hambro, Ruggiero Ricci, Henryk Szeryng, Alexander Kipnis, Mieczyslaw Munz, Vlado Perlemuter, Alceo Galliera, Jascha Horenstein, David Oistrakh, Sylvia Fisher, Maureen Forrester, Isaac Stern, and Daniel Barenboim.

=== Death ===
He died at his Melbourne home on 23 March 1970. Leonard Bernstein and others came to Edzell House to pay their respects after Spivakovsky died.

=== Conductors Performed With ===
Jascha Spivakovsky performed with Arthur Nikisch, Leo Blech, Issay Dobrowen, Willem Mengelberg, Felix Weingartner, Georg Schnéevoigt, Wilhelm Furtwängler, Hans Knappertsbusch, Richard Strauss, Sir Henry Wood, Sir Thomas Beecham, Efrem Kurtz, Sir Adrian Boult, Sir Malcolm Sargent, George Szell, Maurice Abravanel, Sir Eugene Goossens, Josef Krips, Pierre Monteux, Paul Kletzki and Leonard Bernstein.

=== Recordings ===
Spivakovsky never made solo recordings in the studio. In the absence of a commercial discography, his fame dimmed after he ceased touring in 1960. However, in 2015 Pristine Audio began issuing a collection of his live recordings under the title Jascha Spivakovsky: Bach to Bloch. Damian Thompson of The Spectator commented after hearing the first release: "He may well be one of the greatest pianists I have ever heard".
