= Adolf Spivakovsky =

Russian-born Australian vocal teacher

Adolf Spivakovsky (1891-19 August 1958) was a Russian-born Australian vocal teacher, one of the Spivakovsky brothers.

== Biography ==
Spivakovsky was a son of a synagogue cantor. From the age of 17, he studied and then performed in Europe as an opera singer (bass-baritone), but in 1916 he was forced to abandon his stage career for health reasons and fully concentrate on teaching. Before the Nazis came to power, he worked in Germany, and in 1934 joined his younger brothers who settled in Australia, and until his death taught at the Melbourne Conservatorium of Music. Among his students, in particular, the famous singer Sylvia Fischer. The obituary described Spivakovsky as one of Australia's leading vocal educators

He died in 1958.

In 1973, Spivakovsky's widow Paula established the Adolf Spivakovsky Memorial Prize, awarded to young composers of the Commonwealth countries. Since 2007, the prize has been awarded by the University of Melbourne.
