= Moritz Mayer-Mahr =

German pianist and music teacher

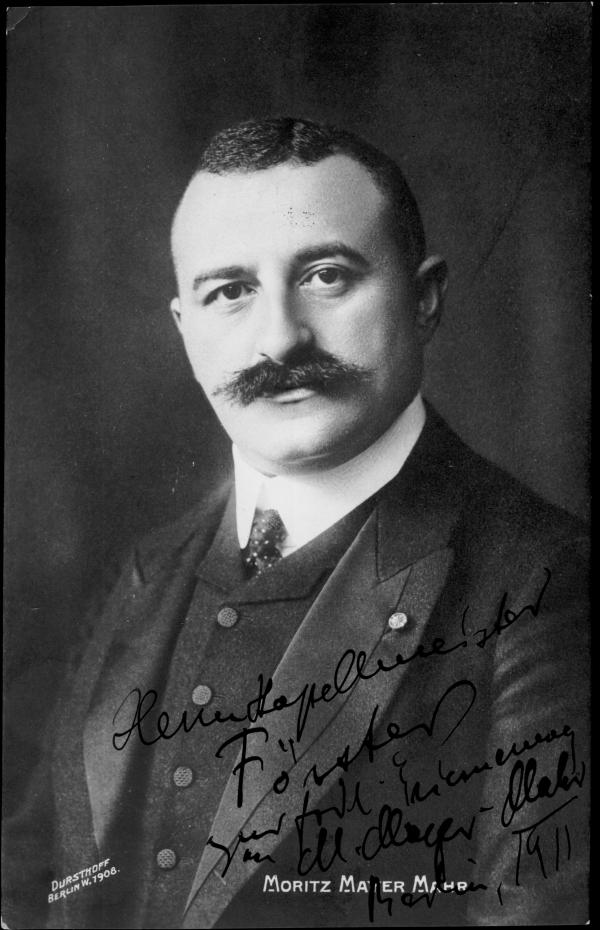
Moritz Mayer-Mahr

Moritz Mayer-Mahr (17 January 1869 – 30 July 1947) was a German pianist and music educator.

== Life ==
Born in Mannheim, Mayer-Mahr was the youngest of five children of the merchant Michael Mayer-Mahr and his wife Clara née Rice(s). Already as a pupil he received piano lessons. From 1886 to 1890, he studied musical composition with Woldemar Bargiel and piano with Ernst Rudorff at the Academy of Arts, Berlin.

Mayer-Mahr undertook concert tours and performed as a soloist, in a duo with Willy Burmester and in a trio with cellist Heinrich Grünfeld and violinist Bernhard Dessau, who was succeeded by Alfred Wittenberg after his death in 1923. He admired Ferruccio Busoni, whom he knew personally. Between 1910 and 1930 he recorded a series of pieces by Franz Liszt, Frédéric Chopin and others. His late recordings, however, were viewed sceptically.

From 1892, Mayer-Mahr taught at the Klindworth-Scharwenka Conservatory in Berlin. Among his students were in particular Manfred Gurlitt, Georg Bertram, Jascha Spivakovsky, Henry Jolles, Lotar Olias, Erwin Bodky and Róża Etkin-Moszkowska. In his Piano school Der musikalische Klavierunterricht (The Musical Piano Lessons) and Die Technik des Klavierspiels, von den ersten Anfangen bis zur Meisterschaft (The Technique of Piano Playing, from the Early Beginnings to Mastery), he was concerned with the pianistic techniques and also with form and style. He published piano pieces by Johannes Brahms and études by Carl Czerny.

From 1907, Mayer-Mahr was one of the judges of the Ibach competition for young artists at the Stern Conservatory. He founded the Mayer-Mahr Foundation to support his students, to which he contributed the considerable donation he received on his 60th birthday.

After the seizure of power by Hitler, Mayer-Mahr lost his seat in the senate of the Academy of Arts, Berlin in 1933 because of his Jewish origins. In 1935 he was expelled from the Reichsmusikkammer. In 1936 he was finally banned from working in the music business. However, he was still allowed to teach foreigners and members of the Jüdischer Kulturbund. In 1937 he left the Klindworth-Scharwenka Conservatory. In 1937 he appeared at an event of the Kulturbund Deutscher Juden with the cellist Leo Rostal of the local orchestra and the concertmaster Wladislaw Waghalter and, again in 1938, for the Jüdische Winterhilfe. In 1938 he taught the Spanish conservatory student Ursula Reig free of charge, which brought him a lawsuit from the local musicians for violation of the professional ban. The proceedings initially resulted in fines, but were eventually dropped.

In 1940, Mayer-Mahr obtained the exit permit for himself and his second wife Paula née Sternberg. They first went to Norway, lived briefly in Vestre Aker and fled from occupied Norway to Sweden, where he taught again. His son Robert did not succeed in escaping; he was deported from the Drancy internment camp to the KZ Auschwitz in 1942 and has been missing since then.

In Sweden were published Mayer-Mahr's Kåserier kring pianot in 1943 and in 1947 Ernste und heitere Erlebnisse rund um das Klavier.

Mayer-Mahr died in Gothenburg at the age of 78.

== Literature ==
- Sara Janina Lengowski: Moritz Mayer-Mahr. In Lexikon verfolgter Musiker und Musikerinnen der NS-Zeit University of Hamburg 2006 und 2014 (lexm.uni-hamburg.de, accessed 23 July 2020).
