= Eugen Schmitz =

German journalist and musicologist

Eugen Schmitz (12 July 1882 – 10 July 1959) was a German musicologist and music critic.

== Life ==
Schmitz was born in Neuburg an der Donau. The descendant of the violin virtuoso, composer and court kapellmeister Louis Spohr first studied law, then music and musicology in Munich with Anton Beer-Walbrunn, Adolf Sandberger and Theodor Kroyer. There he published the article Zum hundertjährigen Geburtstag Franz Lachner's in the Münchener Zeitung already in 1903. He received his doctorate in 1905 and was a music critic for the Munich Allgemeine Zeitung. After a study stay in Italy, he worked as a private lecturer in Munich from 1909, where he habilitated in musicology in 1910, and from 1914 to 1915 he was director of the Salzburg Mozarteum. In 1915 he went to Dresden, where he was music editor of the Dresdner Nachrichten until 1939 and taught as a lecturer of musicology from 1916, and from 1918 as a professor at the Technische Universität Dresden. From 1939 to 1955 he was director of the Musikbibliothek Peters in Leipzig. Schmitz was NSDAP member No. 2.442.825 and in November 1933 signed the Vow of allegiance of the Professors of the German Universities and High-Schools to Adolf Hitler and the National Socialistic State. He wrote for the Dresdner Nachrichten and the Nazi journal Musik im Kriege.

Schmitz died in Leipzig at age 76.

== Writings ==
chronological

- Zum hundertjährigen Geburtstag Franz Lachner's. Münchener Zeitung dated 2 April 1903
- Hugo Wolf (Musiker-Biographien Band 26/Universal-Bibliothek Nr. 4853), Leipzig 1906
- Richard Strauss als Musikdramatiker. Eine ästhetisch-kritische Studie. Munich 1907
- Richard Wagner. (Wissenschaft und Bildung Band 55), Leipzig 1909, 1918
- Harmonielehre als Theorie, Aesthetik und Geschichte der musikalischen Harmonik (Sammlung Kösel Band 49), Kempten/Munich 1911, 1917
- Giovanni Pierluigi da Palestrina. (Breitkopf & Härtels Musikbücher / Kleine Musikerbiographien), Leipzig 1914
- Orlando di Lasso (Breitkopf & Härtels Musikbücher / Kleine Musikerbiographien), Leipzig 1915
- Musikästhetik. (Handbuch der Musiklehre. XIII), 1915
- Schuberts Auswirkung auf die deutsche Musik bis zu Hugo Wolf und Bruckner. Leipzig 1954
- Orlando di Lasso, Leipzig 1954
- Giovanni Pierluigi Palestrina, Leipzig 1954
- Das mächtige Häuflein (Musikbücherei für jedermann Nr. 4), Leipzig 1955
- Unverwelkter Volksliedstil. J. A. P. Schulz und seine „Lieder im Volkston“, Leipzig 1956.
