= Theodor Kroyer =

German musicologist (1873–1945)

Theodor Kroyer (9 September 1873, Munich – 12 January 1945, Wiesbaden) was a German musicologist.

== Life ==
Kroyer was born in Munich. After his Abitur in 1893 at the Wilhelmsgymnasium (Munich) he studied at the Ludwig-Maximilians-Universität München and the Akademie der Tonkunst in Munich. He received his doctorate in 1897 and habilitated in 1902 at the Ludwig-Maximilians-Universität München, where he taught from 1907 as a non-permanent associate professor.

From 1920 to 1923, he was a professor of musicology at Heidelberg University, where he devoted himself particularly to the study of early music. He was then a full professor of music at Leipzig University, where he was instrumental in establishing the Museum of Musical Instruments. In 1932, he became a professor of musicology at the University of Cologne, where he worked until his retirement in 1938. He founded the musicological series Kölner Beiträge zur Musikforschung and was editor of the first three volumes. In the second series of Denkmäler deutscher Tonkunst, Denkmäler der Tonkunst in Bayern, he was responsible for the volume about Ludwig Senfl. His edition of the study score of Mozart's Haffner-Sinfonie is still in use today. He wrote biographies of Josef Rheinberger and Walter Courvoisier. Among his students were Karl Laux, Eugen Schmitz, Hans von Benda, Heinrich Strobel and Wolfgang Fortner.

Kroyer died in Wiesbaden at age 71.

== Publications ==
- Publikationen älterer Musik.
- Walter Courvoisier. Mit einem Bildnis und vielen Notenbeispielen.
- Die Anfänge der Chromatik im italienischen Madrigal des XVI. Jahrhunderts, dissertation
- Theodor Kroyer-Festschrift zum sechzigsten Geburtstag am 9. September 1933
- Ludwig Senfls Werke, introduction and edited by Theodor Kroyer
