= Sylvia Fisher =

Australian opera singer (1910–1996)

Sylvia Fisher AM
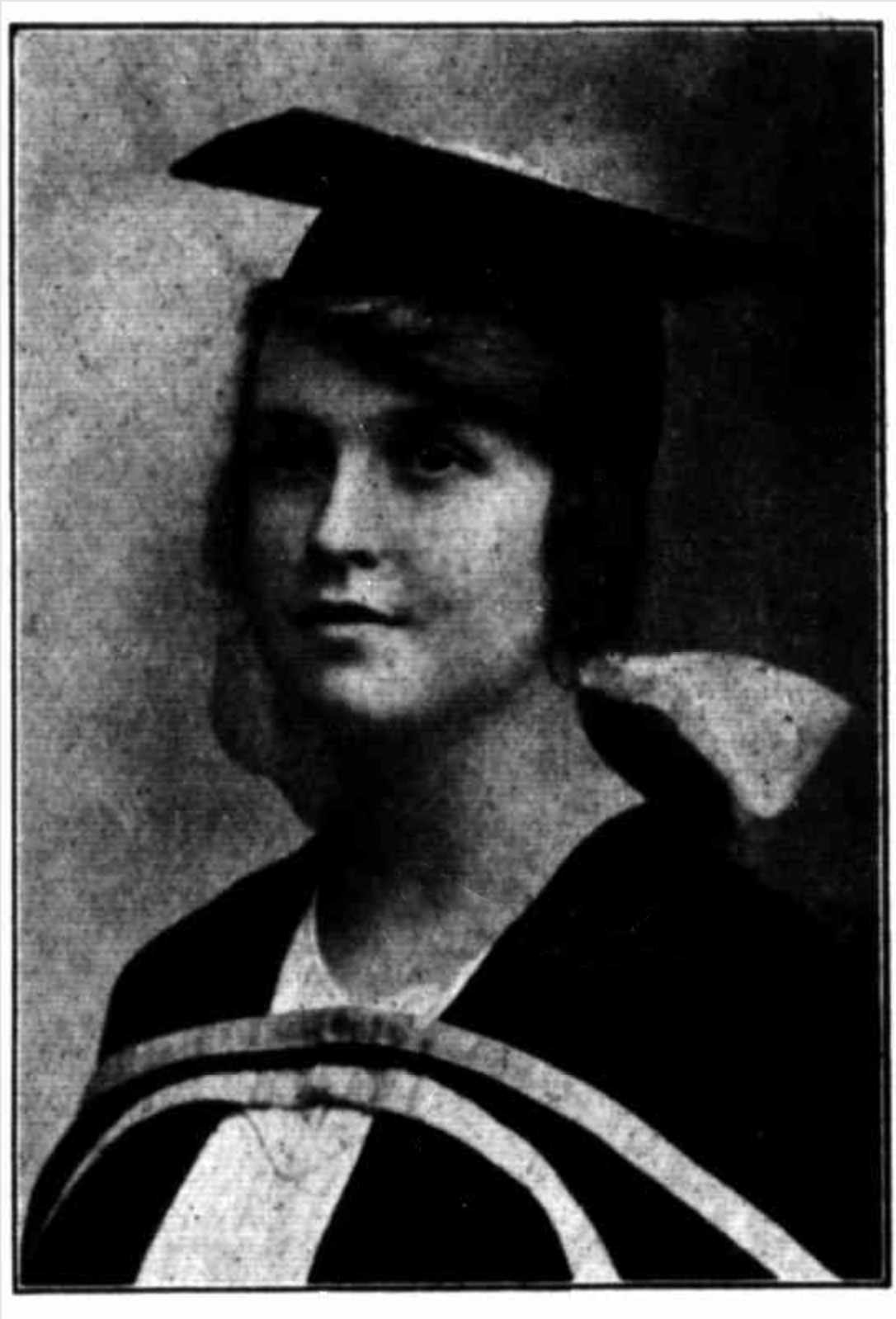
- Fisher in 1936
- Born: Sylvia Gwendoline Victoria Fisher; 18 April 1910; South Melbourne, Victoria, Australia
- Died: 26 August 1996 (aged 86); Toorak, Victoria, Australia
- Occupation: Opera singer (soprano)
- Years active: 1932–1973
- Employer(s): The Royal Opera; Sadler's Wells Opera Company
- Spouse: Ubaldo Gardini (m. 1954)

Sylvia Gwendoline Victoria Fisher AM (18 April 1910 – 25 August 1996) was an Australian operatic soprano whose stage career was made in England, who was especially distinguished in German opera, and who created the role of Miss Wingrave in Benjamin Britten's Owen Wingrave in 1971. Fisher was made a Member of the Order of Australia in the 1994 Australia Day Honours, for "service to the arts, particularly opera".

== Early career in Australia ==
Fisher was born in a private hospital in South Melbourne on 18 April 1910 to John and Margaret Maria Fisher (née Frawley).

She studied the piano from the age of nine, and afterwards entered the Albert Street Conservatorium for singing and voice production and obtained the full diploma. When this was completed she continued her singing studies with Adolf Spivakovsky, and worked with him for many years. She made her debut as a student in Lully's Cadmus et Hermione at the Comedy Theatre, Melbourne, on 5 March 1932, at the Lully Tercentenary Festival. This was her only stage appearance in opera in Australia, but she rapidly became well known there as a concert artist and broadcaster.

Her concert and broadcast repertoire included many operatic arias, and she sang in many broadcasts of complete operas, notably in the title role of Verdi's Aida, as Donna Anna (Mozart's Don Giovanni) and as Ortrud (Wagner's Lohengrin). She also established herself as a fine lieder and oratorio singer in Australia.

== To England, 1947 ==
It was as an established singer, therefore, that she went to England in 1947, and was first heard there in lieder recitals in BBC broadcasts. She joined the Covent Garden resident company in 1948 and rapidly gained approval. Her debut there was as Leonore (Beethoven's Fidelio), after which she appeared in several smaller parts such as the First Norn (Götterdämmerung) and the First Lady (The Magic Flute). She soon became the company's leading dramatic soprano. In 1949 she made a further powerful impression with her Countess in The Marriage of Figaro and her Elsa in Lohengrin, and also made her first and highly successful appearance in a role thereafter much identified with her, as the Marschallin in Richard Strauss's Der Rosenkavalier.

Soon afterwards, she undertook further Wagnerian roles, in which she was to become especially famous. Her Sieglinde (Die Walküre), often performed opposite Kirsten Flagstad's Brünnhilde, won its own individual triumph, and resulted in an invitation to appear as a guest artist in the Rome Opera International season, where she made her debut as Sieglinde in March 1952 under Erich Kleiber, and sang the role several times during the season. In London with equal success she sang the roles of Senta (The Flying Dutchman) and Gutrune (Götterdämmerung), and on 9 January 1953 was Isolde in the great Covent Garden revival of Tristan und Isolde.

In March 1954, Fisher married Ubaldo Gardini, an Italian-born violinist who worked at Covent Garden as an Italian language coach. Their marriage would later end in divorce.

In 1956, she was the Kostelnicka in the new Covent Garden production of Janáček's Jenůfa, a role she sang with distinction for over 20 years. After one magnificent performance in the early 1970s she took over 20 curtain calls.

In 1958, Fisher left Covent Garden after a dispute with director Rafael Kubelík. She visited Australia, performed in the United States, then returned to England where she worked for Covent Garden's rival, the Sadler's Wells Opera Company from 1962 to 1973.

== Concert work ==
She also appeared as soloist with the leading choral societies and orchestras, and at music festivals, under the batons of Sir Thomas Beecham, Sir John Barbirolli and Sir Malcolm Sargent. By 1955 she had made appearances in Beethoven's Missa Solemnis and Choral Symphony, Verdi's Requiem, Delius's Mass of Life, Rossini's Stabat Mater, Arnold Schoenberg's Gurre-Lieder (Tove), and the concert performance of Paul Hindemith's Mathis der Maler.

== Premieres ==
In 1971, she created the role of the formidable Miss Wingrave in Benjamin Britten's Owen Wingrave, opposite Benjamin Luxon, Janet Baker, Heather Harper and Peter Pears. That performance is available on compact disc and DVD.

== Sources ==
- D. Brook, Singers of Today (Revised Edition – Rockliff, London 1958), 79–84.
- G. Davidson, Opera Biographies (Werner Laurie, London 1955).
- H. Rosenthal and J. Warrack, Concise Oxford Dictionary of Opera (OUP, London 1974 printing).
