= Oskar Kaul =

German musicologist

Hermann Friedrich Oskar Kaul (11 October 1885 – 17 July 1968) was a German musicologist and professor at the University of Würzburg.

== Life ==
Kaul was born in 1885 as the son of the chemist Alexander Kaul (1845-1913) and Clara Hoffmanns (b. 1855) in Upper Bavaria, Bruckmühl community. After elementary school he attended a Humanistisches Gymnasium in Cologne, then in 1905 he went to study music at the Hochschule für Musik und Tanz Köln there. Among others, he was student of Max van de Sandt, Lazzaro Uzielli, Fritz Steinbach, Ewald Straeßer and Waldemar von Baußnern. At the same time he studied German literature and philosophy at the University of Bonn. In 1908 he moved to the Hochschule für Musik und Theater München and studied musicology among others with Adolf Sandberger and Theodor Kroyer. He also became a member of the AGV München. Kaul obtained his doctorate there in 1911 with a dissertation on The vocal works of Antonio Rosetti. A one-year teaching position at the Krefeld Conservatory was followed in 1912 by a call to the Hochschule für Musik Würzburg. Ten years later he was habilitated with a thesis on the History of the Würzburger Hofmusik im 18 Jahrhundert. In the summer he finally gave lectures - for the first time in the history of the Würzburg Music School - on historical musicology. Kaul strove to expand musicology and achieved this goal: in 1928 he was appointed extraordinary professor. In the Third Reich the topic became more important for ideological reasons. In 1941, at Kaul's insistence, a regular musicological seminar was approved and established by the Reich Ministry of Science, Education and Culture in Würzburg for the first Academic quarter; he himself was appointed to the seminar board. During this time, from 1942 to 1944, he was also active in the Würzburg music scene as V-Mann of the Sicherheitsdienst des Reichsführers SS. During the Second World War Kaul left the university.

In 1957 he was co-founder of the Gesellschaft für Bayerische Musikgeschichte, whose chairman he was until 1967.

On 17 July 1968 Kaul died at the age of 82 in Unterwössen, Upper Bavaria.

== Publications ==
- 1980: Musica Herbipolensis. Aus Würzburgs musikalischer Vergangenheit. Publisher: Frohmut Dangel-Hofmann. Gress, Marktbreit, ISBN 978-3-920094-16-8.
- 1968: Thematisches Verzeichnis der Instrumentalwerke von Anton Rosetti. Breitkopf & Härtel, Wiesbaden.
- 1935: Zur Musikgeschichte der ehemaligen Reichsstadt Schweinfurt. Becker, Würzburg.
- 1925: Von deutscher Tonkunst. Eine Auslese aus dem musikalischen Schrifttum. R. Oldenbourg, Munich, Literature by and about Oskar Kaul in the German National Library catalogue.
- 1924: Geschichte der Würzburger Hofmusik im 18.Jahrhundert. C.F. Becker, Würzburg, Literature by and about Oskar Kaul in the German National Library catalogue (habilitation text).
- 1911: Die Vokalwerke Anton Rosettis. Greven & Bechtold (Dissertation).
