= Christine Fischer-Defoy =

German woman writer, film director and cultural historian

Christine Fischer-Defoy (born 30 December 1951 in Hanau) is a German woman writer, film director and cultural historian.

== Life ==
As a cultural historian, Fisher-Defoy has been working for many years on the life stories of German emigrants. In addition, she is chairperson of the association Aktives Museum Faschismus und Widerstand in Berlin, which deals with the history of resistance, persecution and exile.

== Awards ==
- 1 October 2010: Order of Merit of Berlin

== Publications ==
- Arbeiterwiderstand in der Provinz 1933–1945, Verlag für Ausbildung und Studium vas: Berlin(West) 1982
- Widerstehen – überleben – mitgestalten – selbstgestalten. Zur Bildhauerausbildung 1933–1945 in Berlin. In Entmachtung der Kunst. Architektur, Bildhauerei und ihre Institutionalisierung 1920 bis 1960. Published by Magdalena Bushart, Bernd Nicolai and Wolfgang Schuster; Frölich & Kaufmann: Berlin 1985 ISBN 3-88725-183-0
- Charlotte Salomon – Leben oder Theater. Das Lebensbild einer jüdischen Malerin aus Berlin 1917–1943, ed. Christine Fischer-Defoy, Verlag Das Arsenal: Berlin (West) 1986
- KUNST/MACHT/POLITIK – Die Nazifizierung der Kunst- und Musikhochschulen in Berlin, Elefanten Press-Verlag, Berlin (West) 1988
- Mein C'est-la-vie-Leben in einer bewegten Zeit. Der Lebensweg der jüdischen Künstlerin Paula Salomon-Lindberg, Verlag Das Arsenal: Berlin (West) 1992.
- Karl Hofer – Ich habe das Meine gesagt. Reden und Stellungnahmen zu Kunst, Kultur und Politik in Deutschland 1945–1955, Nicolai-Verlag: Berlin 1995
- ...und die Vergangenheit sitzt immer mit am Tisch – Dokumente zur Geschichte der Akademie der Künste (West) 1945–1993, selected and commented by Christine Fischer-Defoy, Henschel-Verlag, Berlin 1997
- Berliner ABC – Das private Adreßbuch von Paul Hindemith 1927–1938, edited, introduced and commented by Christine Fischer-Defoy and Susanne Schaal, Transit Buchverlag, Berlin 1999
- Kunst – im Aufbau ein Stein – Die Westberliner Kunst- und Musikhochschulen im Spannungsfeld der Nachkriegszeit, edited by Christine Fischer-Defoy on behalf of the Hochschule der Künste Berlin, Berlin 2001
- George Grosz am Strand – Ostseeskizzen, published in cooperation with the Stiftung Archiv der Academy of Arts, Berlin, Transit Buchverlag, Berlin 2001
- Marlene Dietrich Adreßbuch, published by Christine Fischer-Defoy, Transit-Verlag, Berlin 2003
- Heinrich Mann: Auch ich kam aus Deutschland. Das private Adressbuch 1926–1940; Koehler & Amelang publishing house: Leipzig 2006
- Leonhard Adler – Kommunalpolitiker, Verkehrsexperte, Emigrant, Priester, in Jahrbuch für das Erzbistum Berlin 2007, Cologne 2006, pp. 36–40, ISBN 978-3-939168-07-2
- Vor die Tür gesetzt. Im Nationalsozialismus verfolgte Berliner Stadtverordnete und Magistratsmitglieder 1933–1945.; Ausstellung Berliner Rathaus 30. September bis 30. November 2005, Berliner Abgeordnetenhaus 8. Juni bis 8. Juli 2006; Red. Christine Fischer-Defoy, short biography Christiane Hoss Verein Aktives Museum: Berlin 2066
- Walter Benjamin «... wie überall hin die Leute verstreut sind ...» Das Adressbuch des Exils 1933–1940. Koehler & Amelang: Leipzig 2006
- Hannah Arendt – das private Adressbuch 1951–1975. Koehler & Amelang: Leipzig 2007
- Das private Adressbuch – Frida Kahlo. Koehler & Amelang: Leipzig 2009
- Gute Geschäfte – Kunsthandel in Berlin 1933–1944, published by Christine Fischer-Defoy and Kaspar Nürnberg, Katalog zur gleichnamigen Ausstellung; Aktives Museum- Faschismus und Widerstand in Berlin e.V. 2011. ISBN 978-3-00-034061-1
