= Fesca =

Fesca is a surname. Notable people with the surname include:

- Alexander Fesca (1820−1849), German composer and pianist
- Friedrich Ernst Fesca (1789−1826), German violinist and composer
- Max Fesca (1846−1917), German specialist in agricultural science and agronomy

== See also ==
- the Marconi-San Girolamo-Fesca
- Fédération du scoutisme centrafricain (FESCA)
