= Royal Music Institute of Berlin =

Musicians training centre at Berlin

Coordinates: 52°30′41″N 13°19′24″E

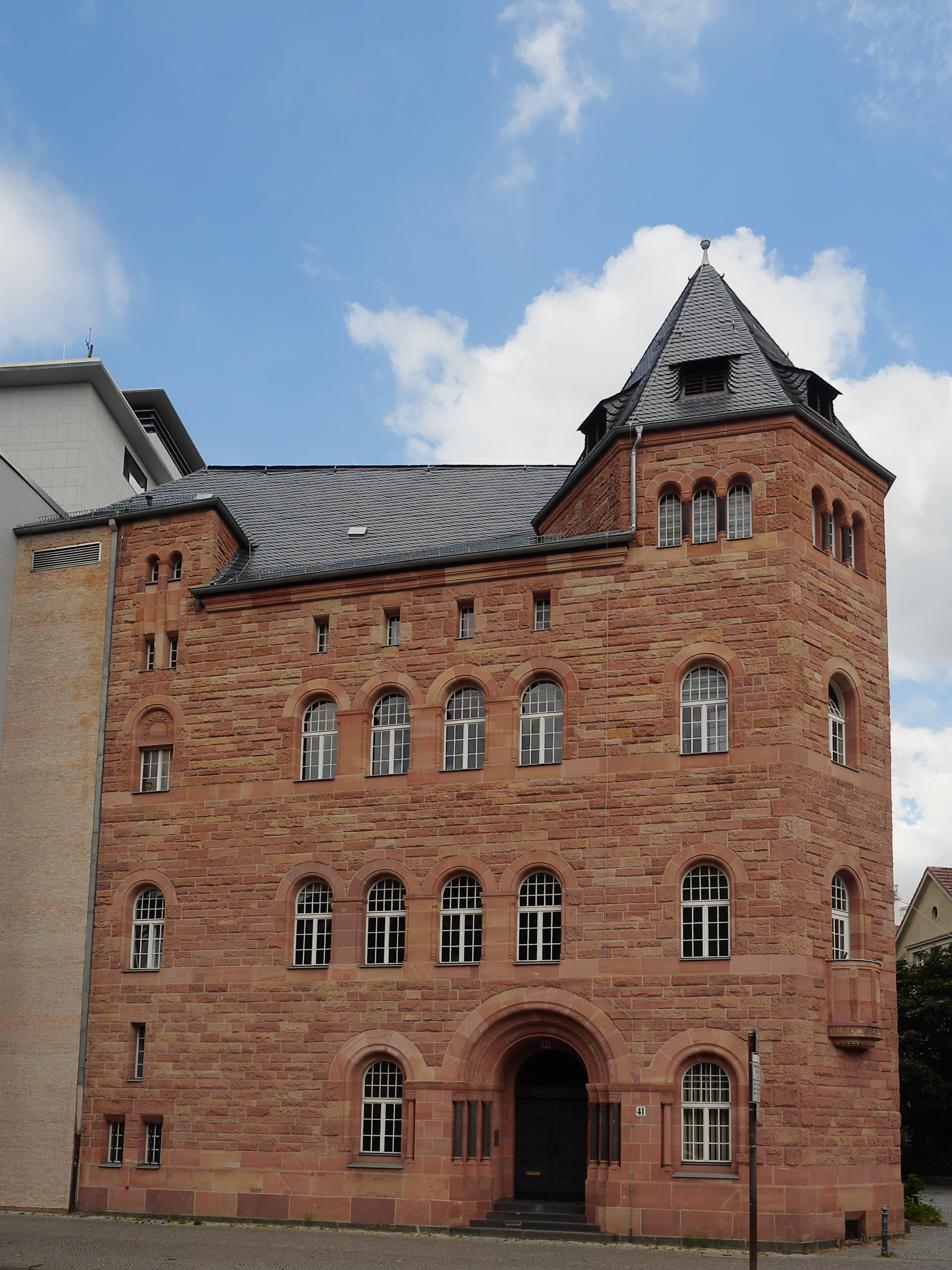
Institute for Church Music at the Berlin University of the Arts at Hardenbergstraße 41

The Königliches Musik-Institut Berlin (Royal Music Institute of Berlin) was a training centre for musicians and a predecessor of today's Institute for Church Music at the Berlin University of the Arts.

== History ==
The institute was founded in 1822 by Carl Friedrich Zelter and served to train organists, cantors and teachers at seminars and grammar schools. In the early years, the training usually only lasted one year, but could be extended to two years if necessary. The first teachers at the facility, which was popularly called the Organ Institute (Orgel-Institut), were August Wilhelm Bach (organ) and Bernhard Klein (vocals and instrumentation). Carl Gottlieb Reissiger followed in 1825, followed soon after by Eduard Grell. Directors after Zelter's death were:

- August Wilhelm Bach, 1832–1869,
- August Haupt, 1869–1891,
- Robert Radecke, 1892–1907,
- Hermann Kretzschmar, 1907–1922,
- Carl Thiel, 1922–1927,
- Hans Joachim Moser, 1927–1933.
- Fritz Stein, 1933–1934.
- Eugen Bieder, 1934–1945.

The institute was initially located in Zelter's apartment in the Singakademie building on the Fortress Moat. In 1832, the company moved to Papenstraße 10 to the official apartment of August Wilhelm Bach, which was located in the immediate vicinity of St. Mary's Church, where Bach worked as music director and organist. In 1854, the Royal Church Music Institute had its own premises at Spandauer Straße 72 for the first time. The institute was later renamed the Institute for Church Music and around 1922 the State Academy for Church and School Music.

== Institute for Church Music ==
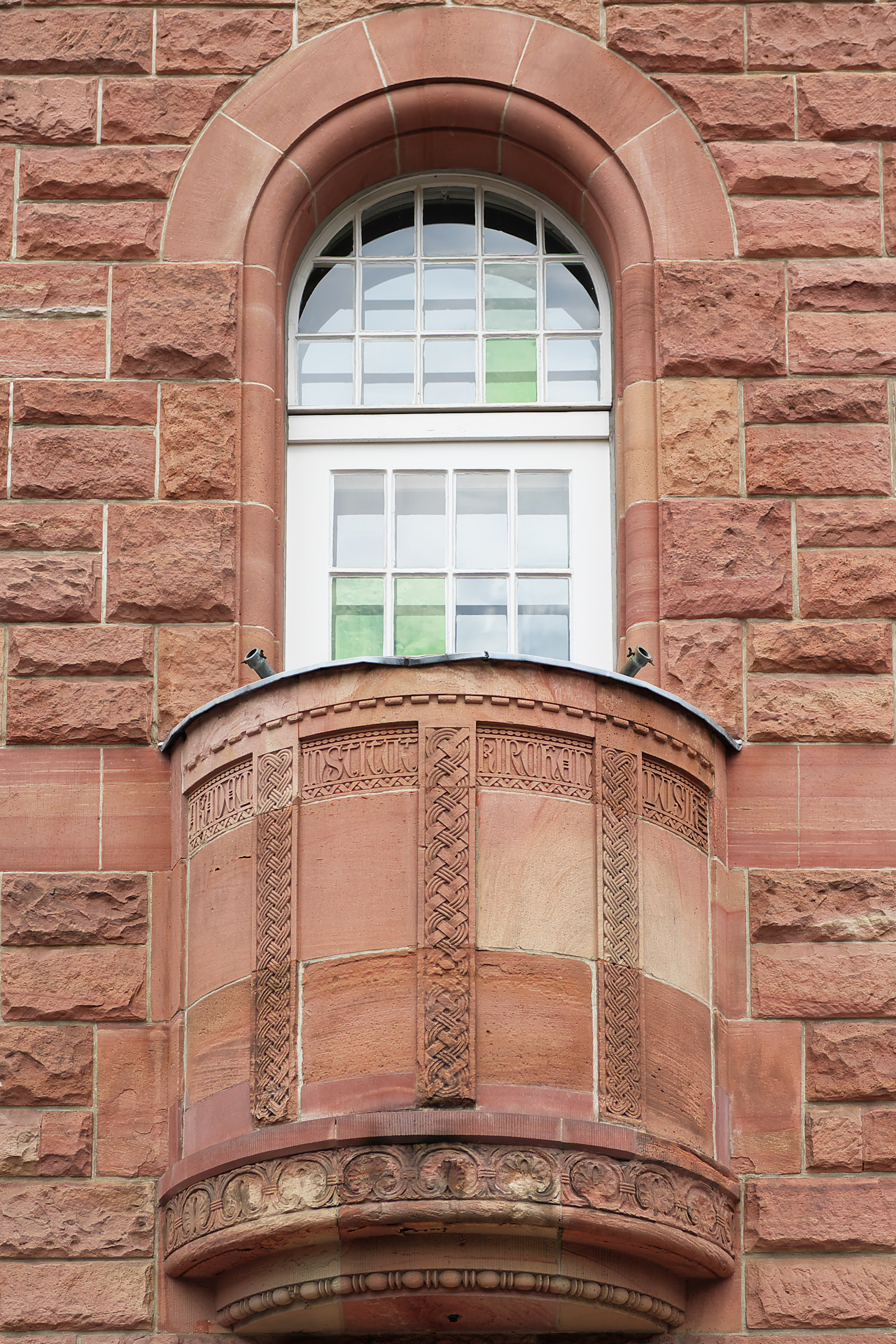
Corner balcony of the Institute for Church Music with the inscription "Academy - Institute - Churches - Music"

After several relocations, the State Academy for Church and School Music found its final domicile at today's Ernst-Reuter-Platz (at that time: Knie) in Hardenbergstraße 41 in Berlin-Charlottenburg, opposite the intersection of Schillerstraße. The building still exists in the area of Technische Universität Berlin and is part of the Berlin University of the Arts.

On May 6, 2014, a one-and-a-half year renovation of the interior was completed.

== Auditorium ==
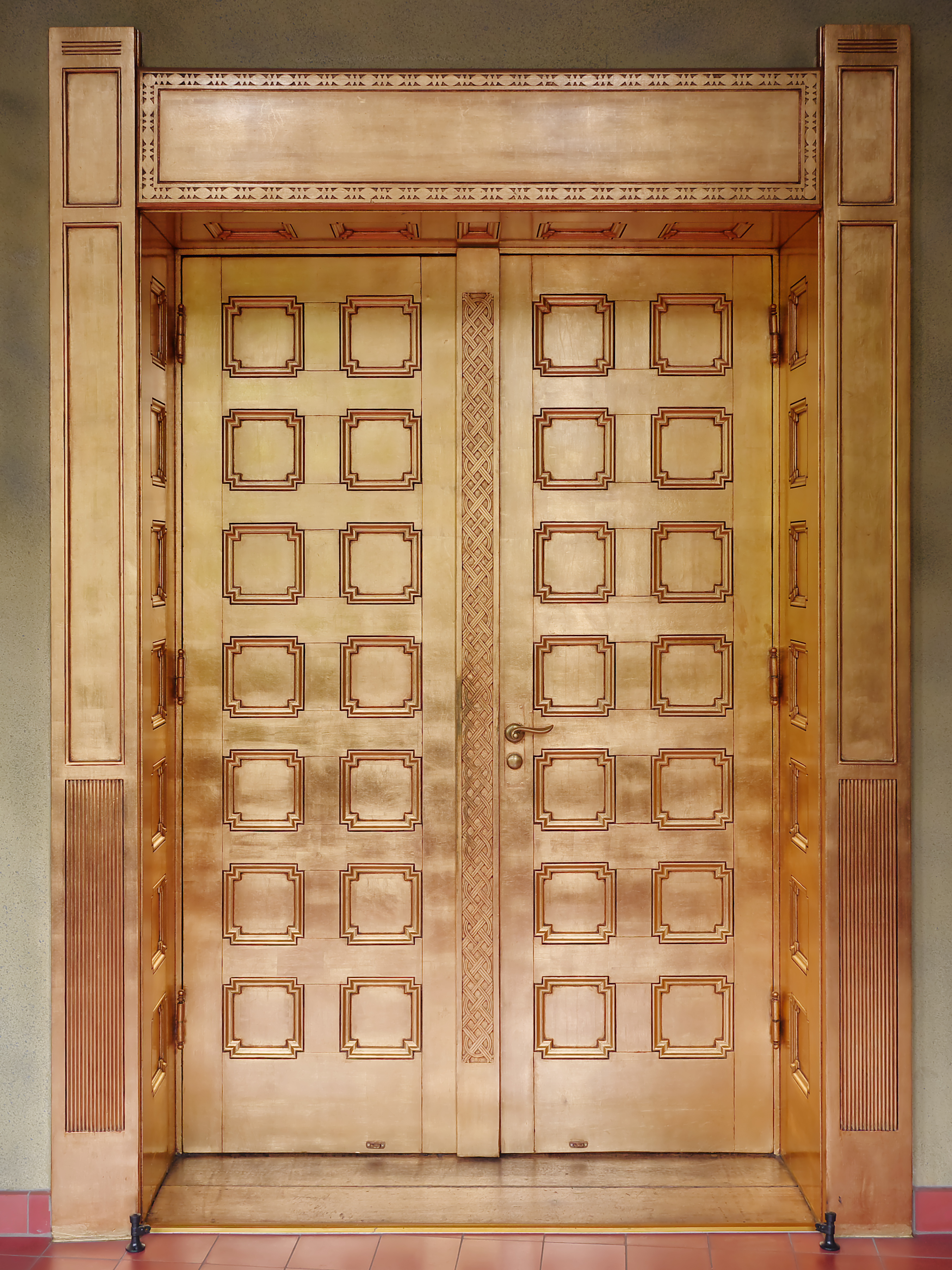
Entrance door to the auditorium

The auditorium with the organ is located on the second floor in the rear part of the building and is accessible from the stairwell via an elaborately designed double door.

The large organ is from the organ builder Karl Schuke and has a main work, swell, positive and pedal work with mechanical action and a total of 48 stops with electric action.

On the walls are three busts of the former directors Hermann Kretzschmar and Carl Thiel, and the choir director of the State and Cathedral Choir Berlin Hugo Rüdel.

Bronze busts in the auditorium

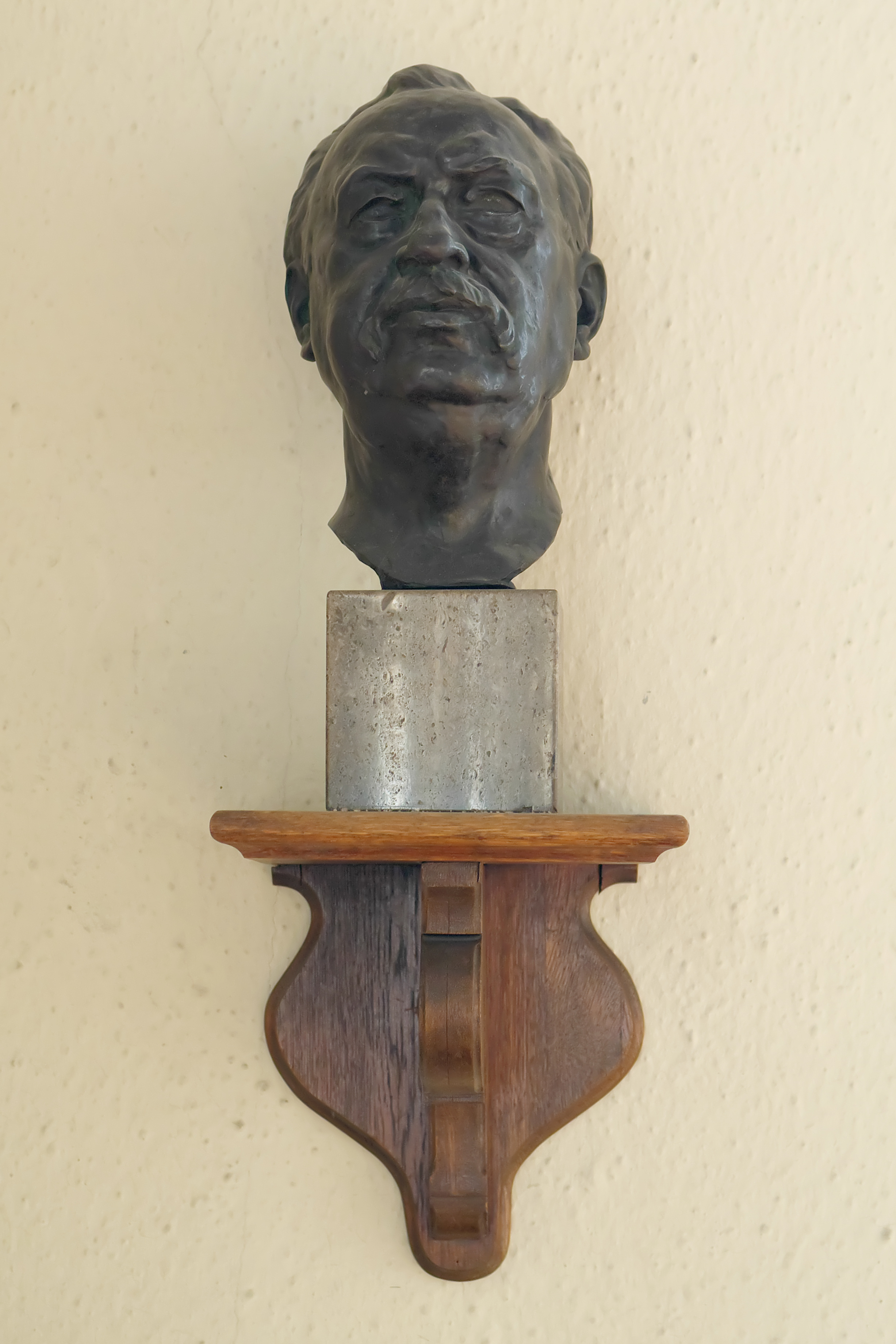
Hermann Kretzschmar

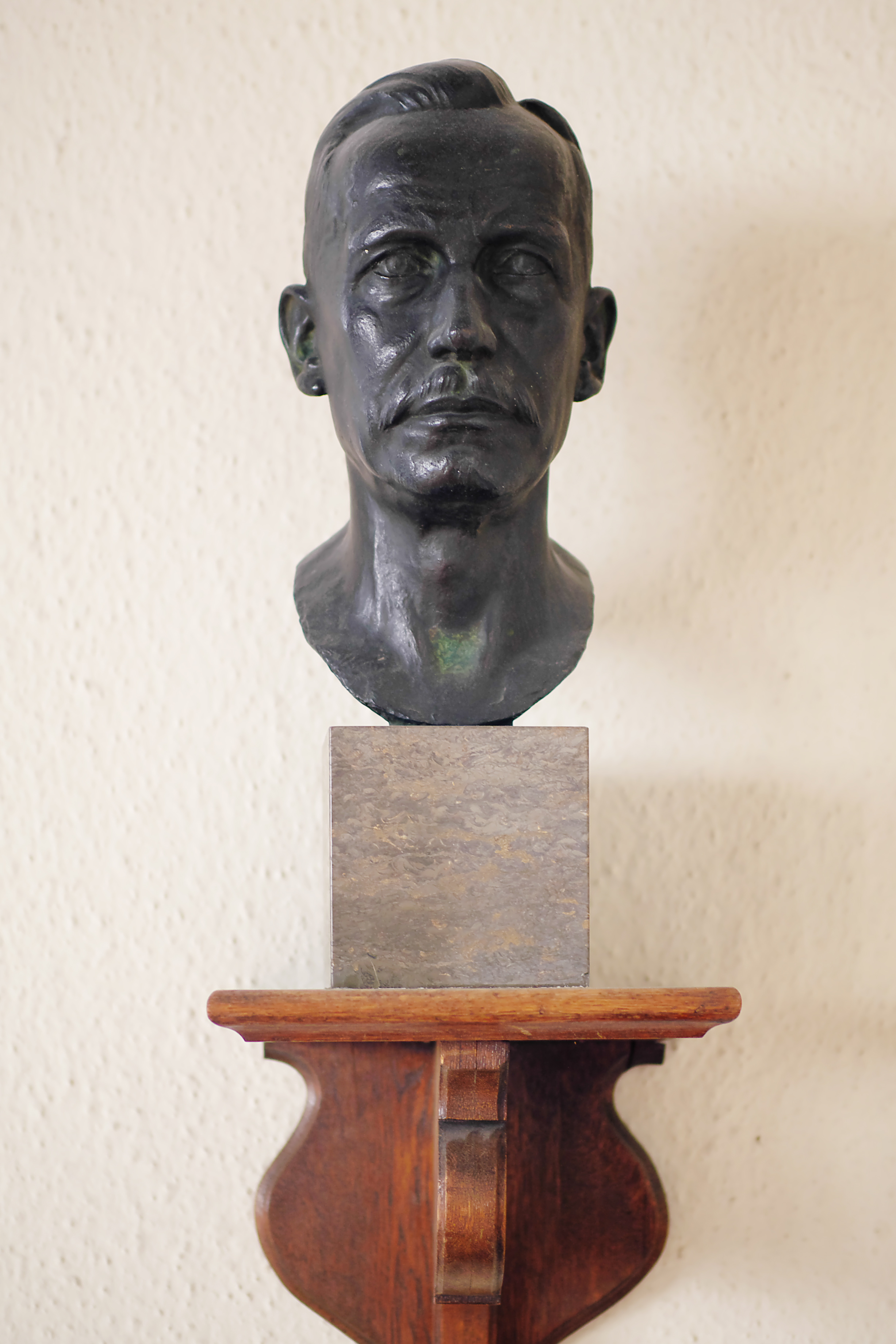
Carl Thiel

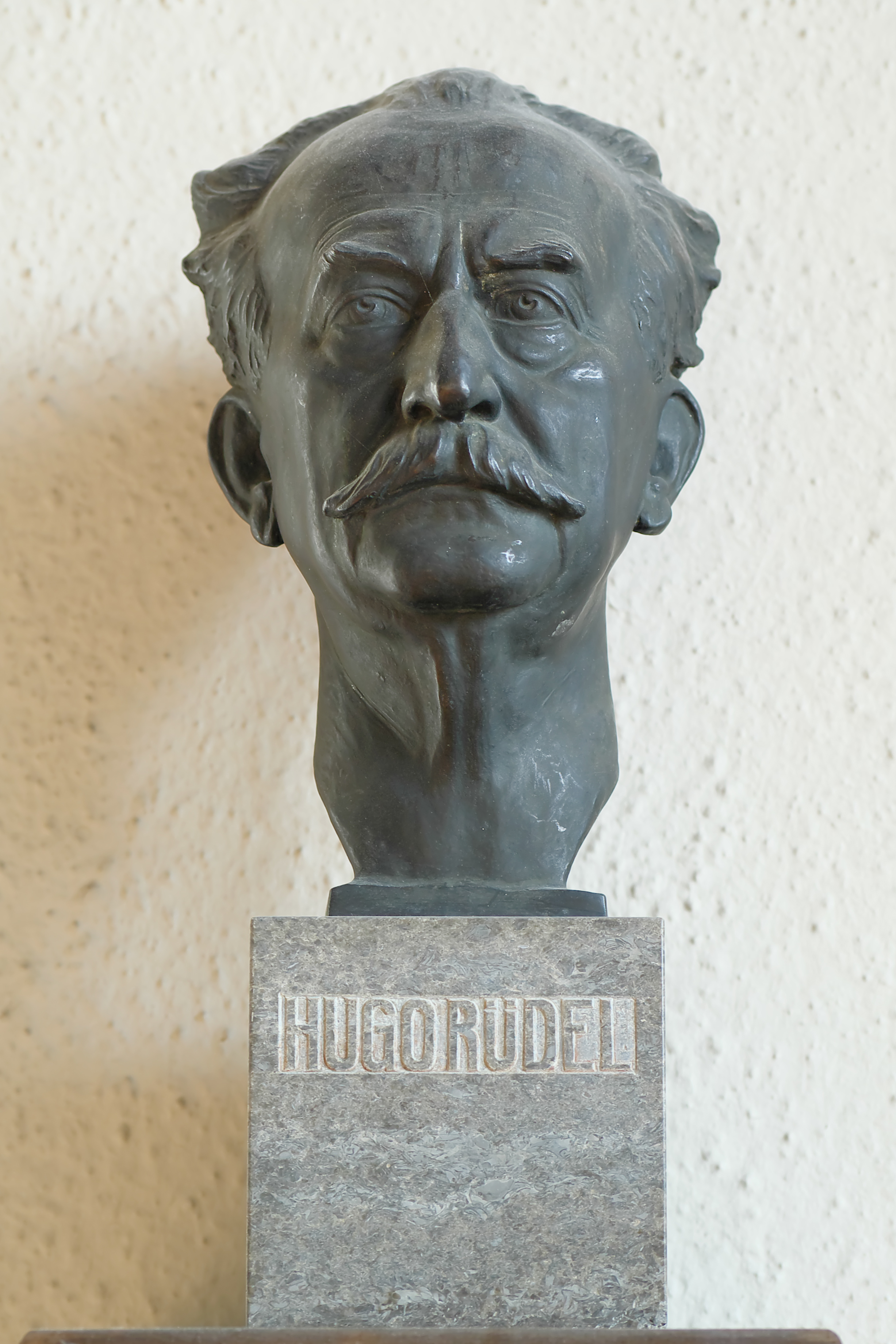
Hugo Rüdel

== Well-known students and staff ==
Well-known students of the institute were Franz Wilczek, John Marquardt, Franz Commer, Gustav Heuser, Carl Albert Löschhorn, Wilhelm Middelschulte, and Joseph Ahrens. Justus Hermann Wetzel was one of the teachers between 1926 and 1937.

== Library ==
The extensive institute library, which goes back to the valuable private library of Johann Nikolaus Forkel and which was taken over by the Royal Library in 1845, was well known.
