= Carl Albert Löschhorn =

German composer and pianist

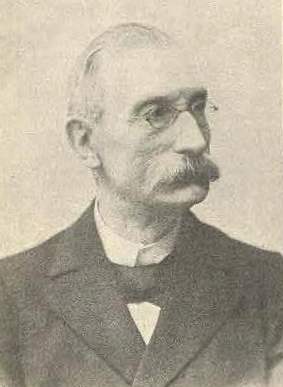
Carl Löschhorn

Carl Albert Löschhorn (27 June 1819 in Berlin – 4 June 1905) was a German composer, pianist and piano pedagogue. He taught in Berlin. Some of his piano studies are still popular today, including Op.65/66/67 of which the Étude op. 66 no.22 is best known.

== Life ==
Löschhorn took piano lessons with Ludwig Berger from 1837 and studied composition at the Royal Music Institute of Berlin after Berger's death (1839) with August Wilhelm Bach and Eduard Grell and piano with Berger's pupil Rudolph Killitschgy. After Killitschgy's death (1851), he took over his post as the first piano teacher at the institute. In 1858 he was appointed professor. He was a member of the Potsdam masonic lodge Teutonia zur Weisheit.

Löschhorn died in 1905 at the age of 85 in Berlin and was buried at the Alter Zwölf-Apostel-Kirchhof in Schöneberg near Berlin. The grave is not preserved.
