= Naue =

Naue is a surname. Notable people with the surname include:

- Georg Naue, German sailor and Olympic medalist
- Johann Friedrich Naue (1787–1858), German composer and organist
- Julius Naue (1835–1907), German painter, illustrator and archaeologist
