= Carl Thiel =

German organist and church musician

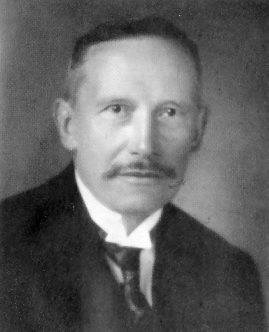
Carl Thiel (early 20th century)

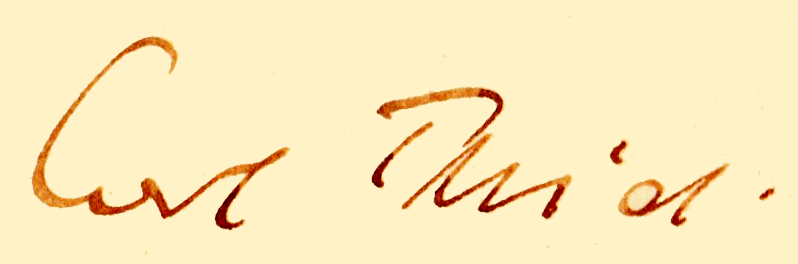

Carl Josef Thiel (9 July 1862 − 23 July 1939) was a German organist, church musician and professor of music.

== Life ==
Born in Oleśnica Mała (formerly german Klein Öls), Thiel was born as the son of the trained miller and grain merchant August Thiel and his second wife Regina Thiel, née Gebel. His mother's two brothers, Carl and Ignatz Gebel, worked as principal teachers and choir directors in Ziębice and Parchwitz. Thiel received his first musical instruction from the cantor Scholz of his home parish. He was baptized catholic and grew up in Lower Silesia in simple circumstances. Nevertheless, he was able - just like his brother Reinhold, who was five years younger - to complete training as a primary school teacher. In 1876 he came to the Präparandenschule and afterwards to the Lehrerseminar in Oppeln. As a junior teacher Thiel taught at a village school in Koszęcin, where he had his own grand piano, and a little later in Zabrze(Mikultschütz). At that time Thiel also played viola. After four and a half years as a teacher and a study leave granted to him in Berlin, he gave up the profession in 1888 and devoted himself to church music.

=== Musical education ===
From 1887 to 1892 Thiel studied with Woldemar Bargiel at the Royal Music Institute of Berlin and worked and taught there as organist and choirmaster, initially in the emerging community of St. Bonifatius (Berlin-Kreuzberg). From 1888 to 1891 he was instructed by Heinrich Bellermann in historical musicology and counterpoint.

In 1890 Thiel founded the Kirchliche Singschule, a choir consisting of members - mainly teachers - of all Catholic parishes in Berlin. After his studies he was appointed "etatmäßiger Hilfslehrer" for Gregorian chant at the institute in 1891. Among other things, he devoted himself intensively to the Gregorian chant, because in his opinion, of all music genre, this was best suited to the liturgy. In 1892 he started as a church musician in the parish church St. Sebastian, Berlin in Gesundbrunnen, where he already found a church choir. In 1898, the Kirchliche Singschule was renamed to Verein für klassische Kirchenmusik, which consisted of the St. Sebastian choir. At the turn of the century Thiel lived in Charlottenburg.

=== Teaching Activities ===
After two years of collaboration with his teacher and the director of the Royal Institute of Church Music, Hermann Kretzschmar, Thiel was appointed his representative in 1909. Together with Hermann Kretzschmar he founded the Madrigal Choir of the Academy and appeared several times as its conductor. He had to give up his activity as a church musician in St. Sebastian on 30 June 1910 due to the workload resulting from his teaching activities. He was appointed Professor of Music and, after Hermann Kretzschmar's illness, became Director of the now renamed State Academy for Church Music and School Music from 1922.

In the 1920s, Thiel was one of the most important music educators in German musical life. From 1925 until his death he was a member of the Preußische Akademie der Künste in Berlin.

=== End of life ===
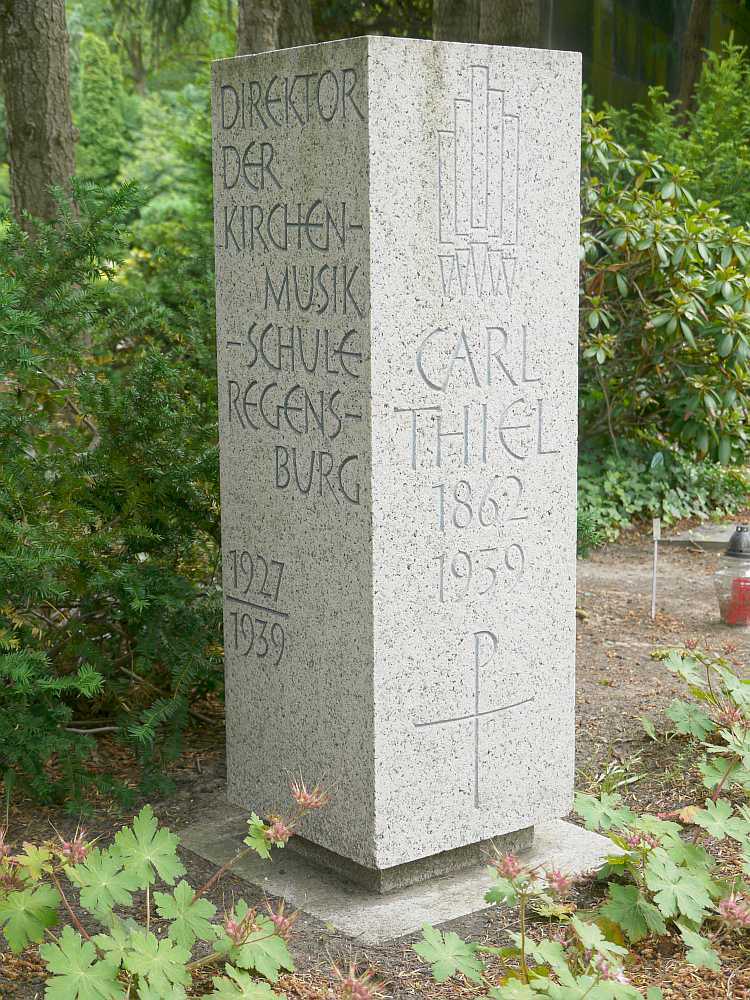
Gravestone of Carl Thiel at the Sankt-Matthias cemetery in Berlin-Tempelhof 52°27′16.7″N 13°21′40.7″E

When Hans Joachim Moser became his successor as director of the State Academy after his retirement in 1927, Thiel went to Regensburg and worked there at the Hochschule für Katholische Kirchenmusik und Musikpädagogik Regensburg. After three years there he was appointed by bishop Michael Buchberger and was also appointed director as successor to Karl Weinmann, who had already been provisionally represented by Peter Griesbacher. He held this position voluntarily and held it until the end of his life in 1939. By organizing a commemoration ceremony for Max Reger and a celebration of German culture with Richard Wagner's Parsifal, Anton Bruckner's Te Deum and works by Max Reger, he and his student Theobald Schrems in 1933 strongly supported newer music.

Thiel died unexpectedly during a spa stay in Bad Wildungen of a stroke at the age of 77. He is buried in Berlin-Tempelhof at the Friedhof der St.-Matthias-Gemeinde (Berlin-Tempelhof).

== Activities ==
As the government's bell expert, in 1916, Thiel saved several parishes from the confiscation and melting down of their church bells because of their beautiful sound or because of their artistic value.

Among his Berlin organ students was Max Walter from 1919 to 1920. The church musician Theobald Schrems passed the state examination for church and school music with him from 1925 to 1928.

In Regensburg the curriculum of the church music school was fundamentally redesigned under Thiel's direction. He increased the duration of studies and tightened the entrance and final examinations, so that the church music school finally received state recognition. Furthermore, he united the Regensburg Church Music School with the Regensburger Domspatzen of the Regensburg Cathedral. During the period of National Socialism Thiel took over the direction of the Fachschaft VI (Catholic Church Music) in the Reichsmusikkammer from 1933.

Thiel dedicated his life to the promotion and cultivation of Gregorian chant. However, he was by no means limited to the occupation with church music and was also engaged as a musicologist.

Thiel composed and arranged sacred vocal music and published older a-cappella music. Some of his works still belong to the repertoire of many church choirs today.

== Awards ==
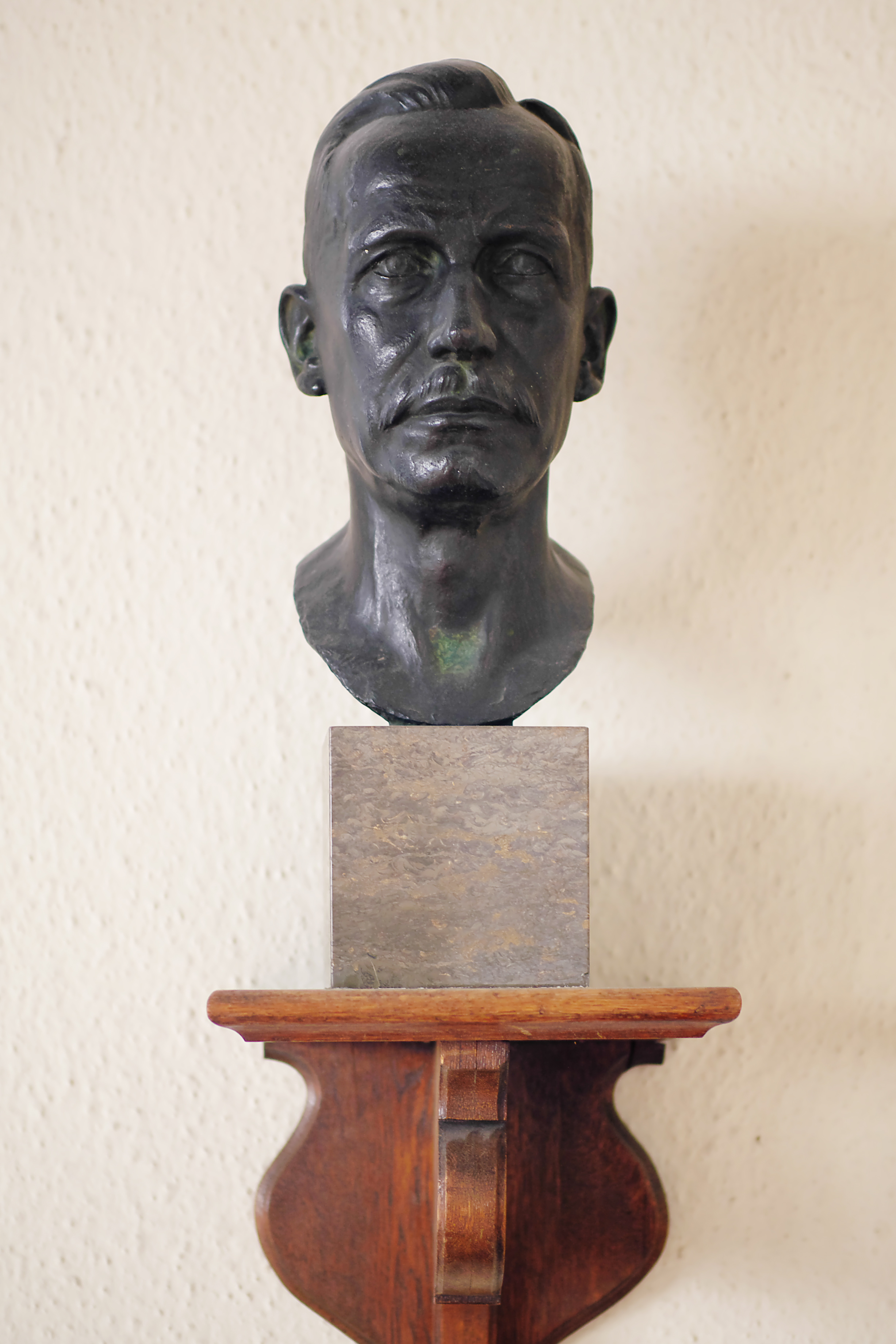
Bronze bust of Carl Thiel in the auditorium of the Institute for Church Music

In the Royal Music Institute of Berlin, a bronze bust of him was erected in the 1920s, which can still be seen today in the auditorium of this building which, as an Institute for Church Music is now part of the Berlin University of the Arts.

He has also been awarded the following honours:

- 1893: Winner of the Felix Mendelssohn Bartholdy Prize.
- 1928: appointed honorary member of the Association of Berlin Protestant Church Musicians
- 1932: appointed honorary member of the Allgemeiner Cäcilien-Verband für Deutschland of the Archbishopric of Breslau
- 1934: Appointment as knight of the Order of St. Gregory the Great by Pope Pius XI

== Work ==
=== Music ===
==== Choral work ====
Selection in alphabetical order:

- 12 lateinische Kirchengesänge, including:
  - Domine non sum dignus
  - Hodie Christis natus est
  - Improperien
  - Haec Dies
  - Lauda Sion
- Abendlied from opus 8
- Acht Mariengesänge for four-part mixed choir, opus 16
- Adeste fideles, setting of "Adeste fideles" for seven-part choir, from Zwei Weihnachtslieder, opus 7
- Adorabo und Domine Deus, two motets for the parish fair, opus 13
- Ave Maria in Venedig, a setting of Ave Maria for women and men choir, opus 15, 1892
- Bonifatius-Messe, opus 14
- Bußpsalm for mixed choir and orchestra (organ ad libitum), opus 22
- Christ ist erstanden, a setting of "Christ ist erstanden"
- setting of "Der Morgenstern ist aufgedrungen"
- Deutsche Improperien for solo quartet and double choir, opus 28
- Domine Deus
- Erlöser-Messe, opus 25
- Erste Pfingstpredigt, opus 26
- Es sungen drei Engel
- setting of "Freu dich, Erd und Sternenzelt"
- Geistliche Szene for soprano solo, male choir and mixed choir, opus 6
- Gott ist die Liebe
- setting of "Ich steh an deiner Krippen hier" for five-part choir
- setting of "In dulci jubilo"
- setting of "Jauchzet dem Herrn alle Welt" for seven-part mixed choir with organ or brass (2 trumpets and 3 trombones), opus 21
- Jesus und der Seesturm, opus 11
- Krippenlied for four-part mixed choir a cappella, opus 7
- Laudate Dominum, Motette im alten Stil nach Motiven von Giovanni Gabrieli, opus 32
- Loreto-Messe, opus 17, 1897
- Maria: Kantate in sechs Bildern after Friedrich Wilhelm Weber's "Marienblumen", for solos, choir and orchestra, opus 5
  1. Die Mutter des Herrn, Annunciation with Magnificat
  2. Unter der Palme, Flight to Egypt
  3. Maria Spinnerin
  4. Nach Golgatha
  5. Voll der Schmerzen
  6. Die Mutter mit dem Sohne, Coronation of Mary
- Missa brevis for four-part mixed choir a cappella, opus 12, 1894
- Missa choralis with organ and three trombones, opus 18
- Missa simplicissima, opus 20
- Offertorien from the Commune Sanctorum for mixed choir opus 24
- Ostergesang for four-part mixed choir, opus 30
- Preis sei Gott im höchsten Throne
- Segne und behüte uns in Deiner Güte for five-part mixed choir a cappella
- Täuschung from opus 8
- Vier größere Motetten, opus 9:
  - Jauchzet dem Herrn, for six voices
  - Credo, for five voices
  - Miserere, setting of Psalm
  - Befestige, o Gott, was du in uns gewirkt hast
- setting of "Vom Himmel hoch, ihr Engel kommt"
- Wanderers Nachtlied after Johann Wolfgang von Goethe, 1921
- Zum neuen Jahr for four-part mixed choir

==== Lieder ====
- Drei Passionsgesänge for voice with organ accompaniment, opus 27, including:
  - Es ist vollbracht with additional mixed choir
- O du sonnige, wonnige Welt (Friedrich Wilhelm Weber) for two Sspranos, Opus 1
- Zwei geistliche Gesänge for voice with organ accompaniment, opus 23, including
  - Lamentation with four-part boys' choir

==== Organ pieces ====
- Phantasie über den achten Psalmton, Op. 29
- Postludium über "Ite missa est IV"

=== Further reading ===
- Moritz Brosig, Carl Thiel: Handbuch der Harmonielehre und Modulation. 9. Auflage. Verlag F.E.C. Leuckart, Leipzig, 1920.
- Friedrich Wilhelm Sering, Carl Thiel: Chorbuch für Gymnasien, Realgymnasien und Oberrealschulen: Op. 117, Verlag M. Schauenburg, Lahr (Baden), 1922.
- Friedrich Wilhelm Sering, Carl Thiel: Chorbuch für Gymnasien, Realschulen usw., nach den ministeriellen Richtlinien für den Musikunterricht von 1925, Verlag M. Schauenburg, Lahr (Baden), 1928.
- Choräle und geistliche Lieder für den Chor der höheren Lehranstalten, Verlag M. Schauenburg, Lahr (Baden), 1930.
- Carl Thiel, in Die Musikpflege. 8. Jahrgang, 1937 / 1938, issue 4, pp. 145–147.
- Carl Thiel, in Die Musikpflege. 10. Jahrgang, 1939 / 1940, issue 7, pp. 247–249.

== Literature ==
- Caecilia, Zeitschrift für katholische Kirchenmusik, issue 3/4, 1932
- August Scharnagl: Die Regensburger Kirchenmusikschule, at Georg Schwaiger (editor): Lebensbilder aus der Geschichte des Bistums Regensburg, BGBR 23/24, Regensburg, 1989/1990, pp. 667–676.
- Clemens August Preising: Carl Thiel. Ein Leben für die Musikkultur des deutschen Volkes. Regensburg 1951.
- Franz Fleckenstein (publisher): Gloria Deo Pax Hominibus. Festschrift zum 100-jährigen Bestehen der Kirchenmusikschule Regensburg. (Publication series of the General Cäcilien Association. Volume 9). Bonn 1974.
- Raymond Dittrich (publisher): 125 Jahre Kirchenmusikschule in Regensburg von Alter Kornmarkt zur Reichsstraße. Regensburg 1999.
