= Carl Bohm =

German pianist and composer

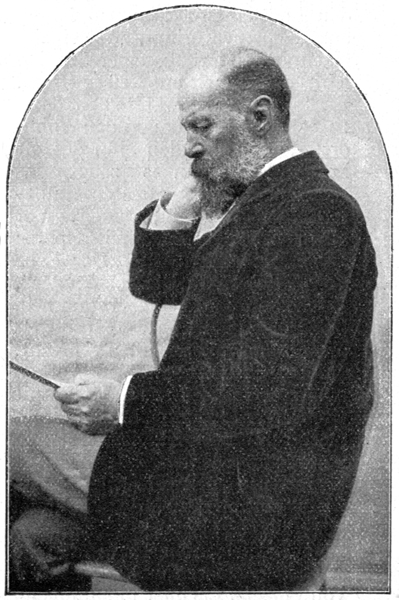
Carl Bohm

Carl Bohm (also known by Karl Bohm and his pseudonym Henry Cooper; 11 September 1844 – 4 April 1920) was a German pianist and composer.

== Biography ==
Bohm was born in 1844 in Berlin. He received training under Carl Albert Löschhorn and later became a music teacher. Bohm remained in Berlin for the majority of his life.

== Legacy ==
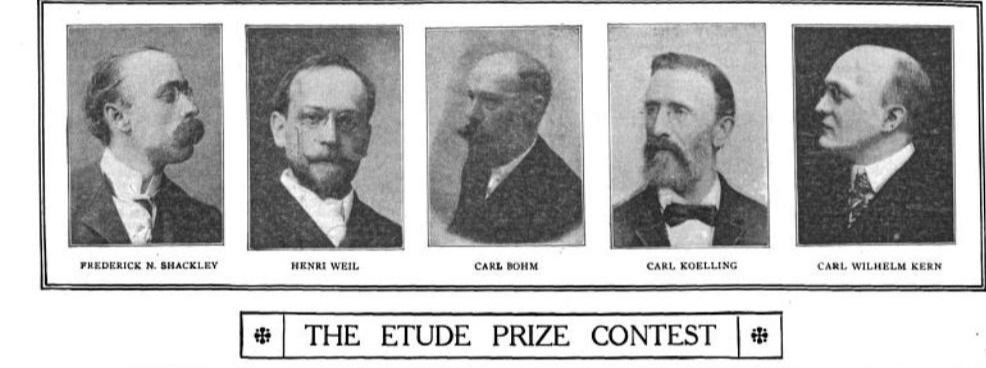
Bohm depicted in The Etude (1911)

Bohm is regarded as one of the leading German songwriters of the 19th century, and wrote such works as Still as the Night, Twilight, May Bells, Enfant Cheri and The Fountain.

According to the Oxford Companion to Music, Bohm was "a German composer of great fecundity and the highest salability... He occupied an important position in the musical commonwealth inasmuch as his publisher, N. Simrock, declared that the profits on his compositions provided the capital for the publication of those of Brahms." Bohm's specialty was music in a lighter vein, very different from the dark, brooding and introspective works of Brahms.

Bohm, like Schubert, was more than just a songwriter, composing in most genres. His chamber music, mostly quartets and piano trios, were popular not only amongst amateurs, but also among touring professional groups who were in need of a sure-fire audience pleaser.

Edition Silvertrust (see references) states that Bohm "was certainly very well known during his lifetime. Yet today, his name brings nothing but blank stares." This curious obscurity is borne out more than ever by the fact that Grove Dictionary of Music and Musicians contains no article about him. Nonetheless, his Sarabande in G minor remains a standard teaching piece for intermediate violinists and violists.

== Selected works ==
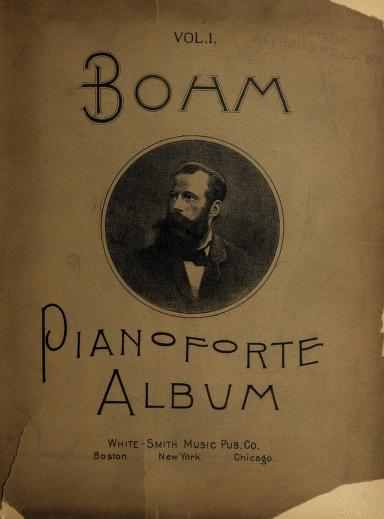
Pianoforte album by White, Smith & Company featuring Bohm's compositions, published 1892

- Lieder (op. 326; including Nr. 27: "Still wie die Nacht“)
- Salon-Kompositionen (op. 327)
- Klaviertrio G-dur. (Forelle; op. 330 Nr.2)
- Perpetuo Mobile (Kleine Suite 6)
- Introduction and Polonaise
- Moto Perpetuo
- Hausmusik
- Spanischer Tanz
- The Fountain (op. 221) (G major)
- Op.99 Petit Rondeau Brillant (G major)
- Op.102 La Zingana - Hungarian Mazurka
- Op.114 No.5 Sextet From Lucia (Donizetti)
- Op.135 May Bells
- Op.213 Charge of the Uhlans - Grand Galop Militaire
- Op.266 If Thou Thy Heart Wilt Give Me - Melodie
- Op.270 Song of the Swallow
- Op.281 Fairy Dance
- Op.282 Frolic of the Butterflies - Kosender Falter
- Op.302 No.5 La Grace
- Op.305 No.b2 The Dance Queen - Polonaise
- Op.327 No.14 Seguidilla - Spanish Song
- Op.357 No.3 Brise printaniere - Polka brillante
- Op.357 No.4 Rosetta - Fantasie-Mazurka
- Op.362 No.1 Soldaten kommen (Soldiers are Coming) March
- Sarabande in G minor for solo violin

== Notes and references ==
- Some of the information on this page appears on the website of Edition Silvertrust but permission has been granted to copy, distribute and/or modify this document under the terms of the GNU Free Documentation License.
