= Ludwig Berger =

Ludwig Berger may refer to:

- Ludwig Berger (composer) (1777–1839), German composer
- Ludwig Berger (director) (1892–1969), German film director
