= Spy Kids: All the Time in the World (soundtrack) =

Film score by Robert Rodriguez and Carl Thiel
- Released: August 16, 2011
- Recorded: 2011
- Genre: Film score
- Length: 44:13
- Label: Lakeshore
- Producers: Robert Rodriguez; Carl Thiel; Richard Glasser

Robert Rodriguez film soundtrack chronology
Machete (2010)	Spy Kids: All the Time in the World (2011)	Machete Kills (2013)

Spy Kids: All the Time in the World is the soundtrack album to the 2011 film Spy Kids: All the Time in the World directed by Robert Rodriguez which is the fourth instalment in the Spy Kids film series. The film score was composed by Robert Rodriguez and Carl Thiel and released through Lakeshore Records on August 16, 2011.

== Development ==
As with all of his films, including those which were a part of the Spy Kids series, the film score is composed by the director Rodriguez himself. This time, he collaborated with Carl Thiel, who associated with Spy Kids 3-D: Game Over (2003) as a score producer and mixer. Rodriguez recorded the score at his hometown in Austin, Texas and performed by the Texas Philarmonic Orchestra, which performed the score for the predecessors. The album was released through Lakeshore Records on August 16, 2011.

== Reception ==
Jonathan Weilbaecher of The Flickcast rated the soundtract with a score of three out of five, and wrote "In all, the music for this movie is solid, but the soundtrack lacks a certain something that would ensure a well rounded listening experience. Although for what it lacks in definition it does make up for it in terms of quality tracks." William Ruhlmann of AllMusic rated two-and-a-half out of five wrote "this is music meant as anonymous accompaniment to the nonstop harmless action on the screen, but it doesn't show much originality or individual character on a soundtrack album."

Andrew Barker of Variety and Todd McCarthy of The Hollywood Reporter found the score to be "repetitive" and "boring". Ryan Lambie of Den of Geek wrote "Similar to previous instalments in the franchise, the original score by Carl Thiel and Robert Rodriguez is playful and electric guitar-led, integrating the classic Spy Kids theme where it can through tracks like Carmen Cortez and Spy Kids 2.0. As such, the film’s soundscape remains colourful, even if it sometimes becomes too skewed and cartoonish for its own good." Ann Wells of Fandomania wrote "There is just the right amount of slow and suspenseful music to contrast with the more upbeat tracks, but nothing too scary as befits a family movie. Whether you plan to check out the movie or not, definitely check out this soundtrack."

== Track listing ==
No.	Title	Length
1.	"Spy Mom"	2:29
2.	"Rebecca & Cecil"	0:48
3.	"Panic Room"	3:46
4.	"Jet Luge Chase"	3:10
5.	"Carmen Cortez"	2:22
6.	"Spy Baby"	2:48
7.	"Argonaut"	1:57
8.	"T.O.O.T."	1:58
9.	"Big Time Watch Shop"	1:05
10.	"Wilbur Wilson"	0:56
11.	"The Timekeeper"	2:10
12.	"Hammer Hands"	2:43
13.	"O.S.S."	1:15
14.	"Juni Cortez"	0:33
15.	"Danger D'Amo"	2:18
16.	"Spy Kids 2.0"	2:19
17.	"Time And Time Again"	1:56
18.	"Danger's Past"	3:33
19.	"Time's Up"	3:36
20.	"Spy Hunter"	1:05
21.	"You Have Been Activated"	1:15
Total length:		44:13

== Personnel ==
Credits adapted from liner notes:

- Music composers and producers – Carl Thiel, Robert Rodriguez
- Soundtrack producer – Richard Glasser
- Recording and mixing – Carl Thiel
- Music consultant – Jaime Hartwick
- Score consultant – Pablo Thiel
- Music coordinator – Brianne-Addette Bogle
- A&R – Eric Craig
- Executive producers – Brian McNeils, Skip Williamson
- Technician – Brad Engelking
- Art direction – John Bergin
