= Alexander Fesca =

German composer and pianist (1820–1849)

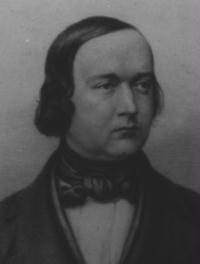
Alexander Ernst Fesca

Alexander Ernst Fesca (22 May 1820 in Karlsruhe – 22 February 1849 in Braunschweig) was a German composer and pianist.

== Life ==
Alexander Ernst Fesca was born in Karlsruhe on 22 May 1820. He was the second of four sons of composer Friedrich Ernst Fesca (1789–1826) and his wife Charlotte (born Dingelstedt, daughter of the horn player Johann Heinrich Dingelstedt). He received his early music instruction from his father, and made his performance debut at the age of 11 as a pianist in his hometown. At the age of 14 he began training at the Prussian Academy of Arts in Berlin where he studied with August Wilhelm Bach (composition and harmony), Wilhelm Taubert (piano), Georg Abraham Schneider (instrumentation), and Carl Friedrich Rungenhagen (composition and harmony).

In 1838, Fesca returned to Karlsruhe where he his first opera, Mariette, was premiered that same year. He later had a second opera premiere in that city: Die Franzosen in Spanien (1841). In 1839 he had his first major success as a concert pianist; giving a concert tour as a piano virtuoso. In 1841 he became a chamber musician in the employ of Prince Egon von Furstenberg.

Fesca relocated to Brunswick (now Braunschweig) in 1842 where two more of his operas were premiered: Der Troubadour (1847) and Ulrich von Hutten (1849). Sources disagree as to his level of skill. Grove Music Online states "He was a prolific composer of songs, chamber and piano music which often lack originality. His best works include the Piano Sextet op.8, though he is remembered chiefly for his songs." Theodore Baker was more complimentary, describing him as "a composer of rare talent". Some of his other compositions included a sonata for violin and piano and two piano trios.

Fresca died in Brunswick at the age of 28 on 22 February 1849. The cause was lung disease.

== Works (partial list) ==
Adagio

- Espérance (op. 24)

Fantasias

- Fantasie auf Motive der Oper „Don Giovanni“ von Wolfgang Amadeus Mozart (op. 43)
- Fantasie auf Motive der Oper „Der Freischütz“ von Carl Maria von Weber (op. 50)
- Le dernier soupir (op. 58)

Piano Sextets

- Klaviersextett B-Dur (op. 8)

Piano Trios

- Klaviertrio Nr. 1 (op. 11)
- Klaviertrio Nr. 2 (op. 12)
- Klaviertrio Nr. 3 (op. 23)
- Klaviertrio Nr. 4 (op. 31)
- Klaviertrio Nr. 5 (op. 46)
- Klaviertrio Nr. 6 (op. 54)

Piano Quartets

- Klavierquartett Nr. 1 (op. 26)
- Klavierquartett Nr. 2 (op. 28)

Operas

- „Die Franzosen in Spanien“ (UA Karlsruhe 1841)
- „Der Troubadour“ (UA Braunschweig 1847)
- „Ulrich von Hutten“ (unvollendet)

Operettas

- „Mariette“ (UA Karlsruhe 1838)

Rondos

- Introduction et grand rondeau (op. 3)

Septets

- Großes Septett Nr. 1 (op. 26)
- Großes Septett Nr. 2 (op. 28)

String Quartets

- Streichquartett c-moll

Lieder

- Fünf Lieder von Heinrich Schütz für eine Tenor-Stimme mit Begleitung des Pianoforte (op. 13), Braunschweig, G.M. Meyer jr. 1842
