= Martin Pierre d'Alvimare =

French musician, harpist and composer

- Born: 18 September 1772; Dreux
- Died: 3 June 1839 (aged 66); 1st arrondissement of Paris
- Occupations: Harpist; Composer

Martin Pierre d'Alvimare du Briou (18 September 1772 – 3 June 1839), sometimes spelled Dalvimare, was a French musician, harpist and composer. He was harp master of Queen Hortense.

== Biography ==
Martin Pierre d'Alvimare du Briou was born on 18 September 1772 at Dreux. His parents were Pierre d'Alvimare du Briou, a lawyer in the Parliament and receiver of gabelles, and Cécile Doury de Sacy. He received an excellent education, and at an early age learned drawing, as well as the harpsichord and harp. Noticed by Duke of Penthièvre residing in the nearby château d'Anet, he was introduced by the latter and Madame de Lamballe to the court at the age of 7, where he played in front of Queen Marie Antoinette. In 1788, he composed his first opéra, Églé.

At the age of fourteen, he obtained the office of receiver of salt-tax of his father, but the position did not interest him and it could be done by proxy. He therefore embarked on a military career and became a bodyguard of Louis XVI, which enabled him to compose at leisure. He was at his post for the Insurrection of 10 August 1792 and managed to escape, taking refuge in the porter's house of one of his friends, who made him pass for his sick son.

Inscribed on the list of emigrants, he hid under another name. There was nothing left of the confiscated fortune of his father. In order to earn his living, he became a draftsman for a handkerchief factory near Dreux, under the name of Dalvimare.

During the Consulate period he was removed from the list of emigrants; he returned to Paris and resumed his musical activities successfully. He was admitted as harpist of the Paris Opera in 1800 and as a musician in the chamber orchestra of Napoleon. In 1807 he had the title of harp master of Joséphine and of her daughter Hortense. Familiar of Malmaison, he frequented Talma, general Lauriston, and was an intimate friend of the composer Étienne Méhul. His students included Marie Nicole Simonin Pollet.

Having recovered the fortune he possessed before the Revolution, he resigned from all his posts in 1812 and retired to Dreux, where he spent the rest of his life painting and composing.

He was married to Anne Louise Didelot, who died in 1804, then in 1812 to Alexandrine de Feuquières. He went to Paris to be treated for illness and died there on 3 June 1839.

== Works ==
- Trois sonates pour harpe et violon ad libitum, op 2, 9, 12, 14, 15, 18 (3 per opus)
- Grande sonate pour harpe avec violon, op 33
- 3 Duos pour harpe et piano, n° 1 op 22, n° 2 without opus, n° 3 op 31
- Concerto pour harpe et orchestre en ut majeur, op 30
- Premier et Deuxième duo pour 2 harpes
- Plusieurs morceaux pour cor et harpe composed with Frédéric Nicolas Duvernoy
- Symphonie concertante pour cor, harpe et orchestre, with Duvernoy (1798)

=== Harp ===
- Recueil de romances, op 4, 13, 15, 20
- 3 Sonates, op 14
- 3 Grandes Sonates, op 18
- Thème varié pour harpe, op 21
- Scène pour la harpe, op 23
- Fantaisie sur le pas russe, op 24
- Airs russes variés, op 25
- Recueil d'airs connus pour la harpe
- Fantaisie et variations sur l'air de Léonce
- Air tyrolien varié
- Airs des Mystères d'Isis en pot-pourris et variés
- Fandango des Noces de Gamache varié
- Fantaisie sur l'air Mon cœur soupire
- Fantaisie sur l'air Un jeune troubadour
- Fantaisie sur un thème donné
- Fantaisie et douze variations sur un air piémontais
- Fantaisie et variations sur l'air Charmant ruisseau
- Airs et ouvertures d'opéras arrangés pour la harpe

=== Vocal music ===
- 1788: Églé, opéra comique
- 1809: Le Mariage par imprudence, opéra comique

== Sources ==
- François-Joseph Fétis, Biographie universelle des musiciens et bibliographie générale de la musique
- Auguste Jal, Dictionnaire critique de biographie et d'histoire
