= Hugo Rüdel =

German choral director and conductor (1868–1934)

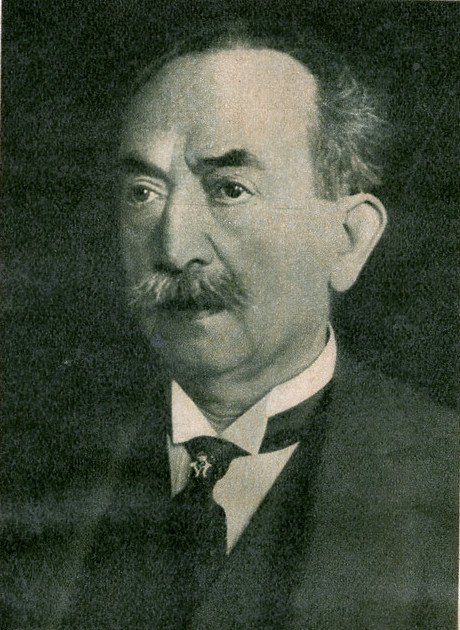
Picture from Hugo Rüdel's obituary

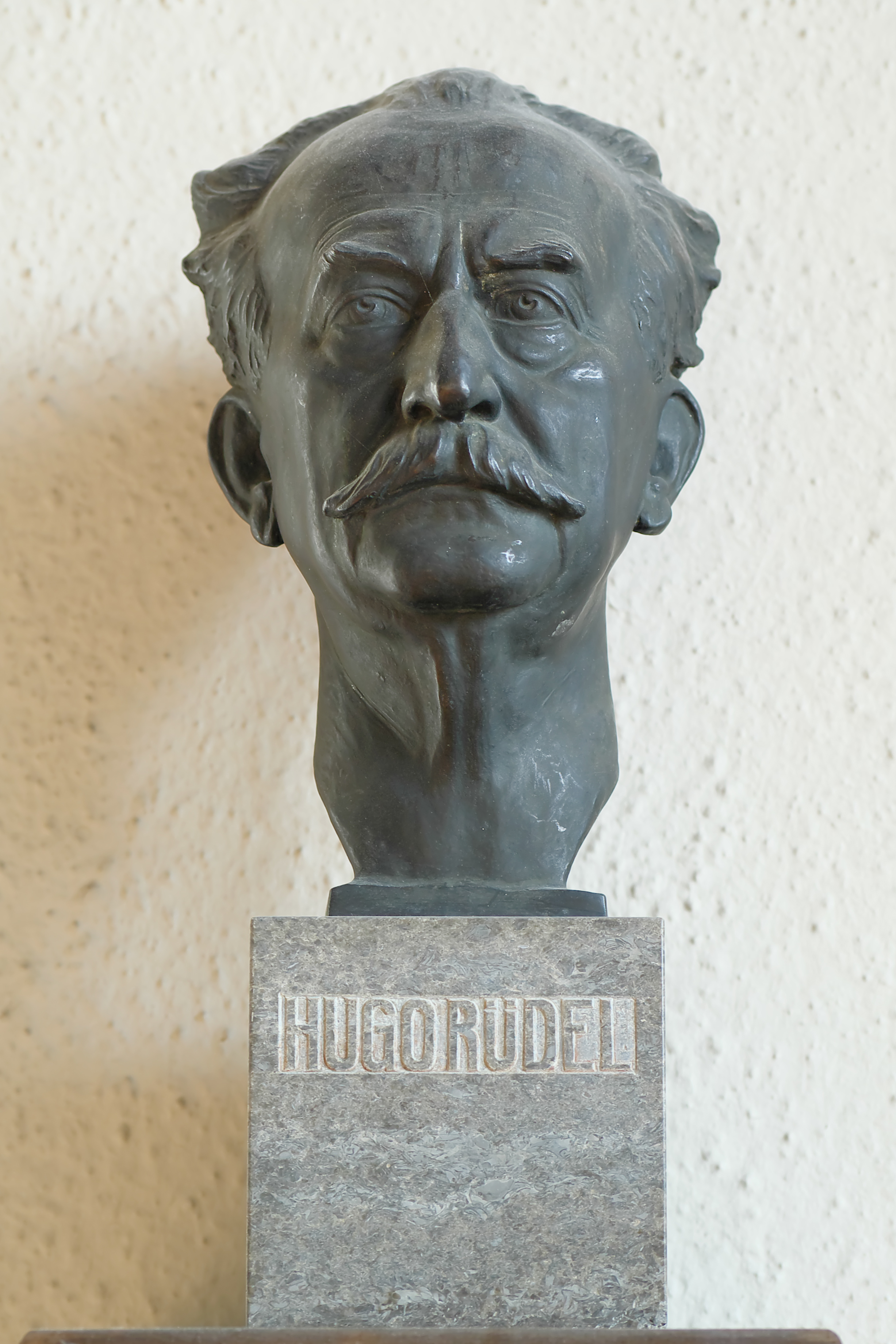
Bronze bust of Hugo Rüdel in the Royal Music Institute of Berlin for church music of the Universität der Künste Berlin

Hugo Rüdel (7 February 1868 – 27 November 1934) was a German Choir director and conductor.

== Life ==
Rüdel was born in Havelberg. His father Johann Friedrich August Rüdel (1816-1887) ran a brickworks and was the town conductor of Havelberg. Hugo was the youngest of five children; his mother was Pauline Amalia Albertine, née Knüppelholz (1831-1891). He was christened on 10 May 1868 in the Havelberg City Church of St. Laurentius. From 1875 he attended the town school.

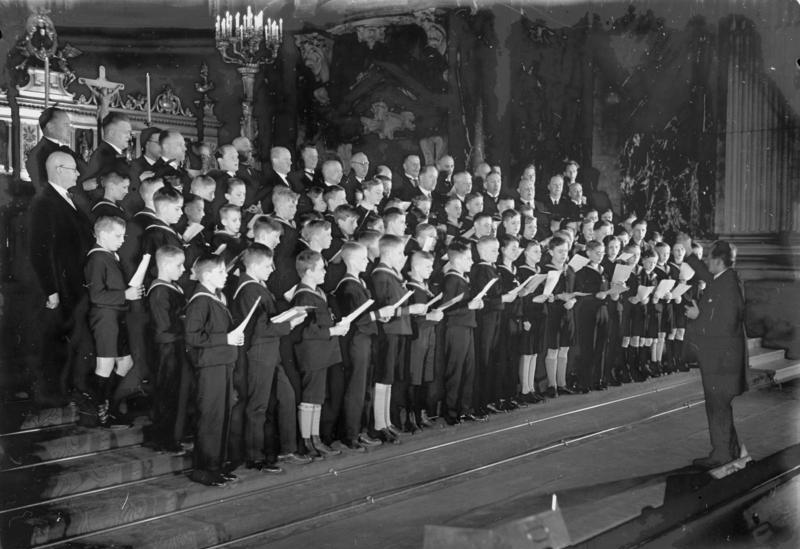
Hugo Rüdel at a rehearsal of the Staats- und Domchor in the Berliner Dom, 1932

After training as a horn player at the Universität der Künste Berlin with Fritz Lehmann, he first worked as a French horn player at the Krolloper. Besides, he was a pupil for piano with Karl Heinrich Barth. After a short period as solo horn player with the Gürzenich Orchestra Cologne in Cologne, he became an accessory and chamber music wind player with the Staatskapelle Berlin. From 1899 to 1910, he was a teacher (professor from 1908) for French horn at the Hochschule für Musik zu Berlin. Also in 1899, Rüdel became conductor of the Berlin Court Opera Chorus, later the State Opera Chorus, and in 1910 he was appointed its first choral conductor; he held this position until his retirement in 1933. From 1906 to 1934 he was the choir director of the Bayreuth Festival. From 1909 to 1933 he was conductor of the Staats- und Domchor Berlin, with which he undertook numerous journeys abroad. Furthermore, in 1916 he became first choral master of the Berliner Lehrer-Gesangverein. In 1920 he was again appointed director of the opera choir school at the Musikhochschule. In 1922 he conducted the choir at the premiere of the film Hanneles Himmelfahrt. 1927-1928 he was also responsible for the direction of the radio choir of the Funk-Stunde Berlin. Finally still on 21 March 1933 he was involved with the Staats- und Domchor in the organization of the Day of Potsdam, where the newly elected Reich Chancellor Adolf Hitler placed himself with public appeal in a Prussian national-conservative tradition.

Rüdel was married to Luise Geissler (24 September 1871 - 6 June 1956). He died in Berlin at the age of 66. They found their last resting place at the Stahnsdorf South-Western Cemetery.

In 1903 and 1913, together with Richard Strauss, he published Nachgelassene Werke für Horn von Franz Strauss.

== Honours ==
Even before his death in 1933, a bronze bust was made, which was originally placed in the Berlin Cathedral.

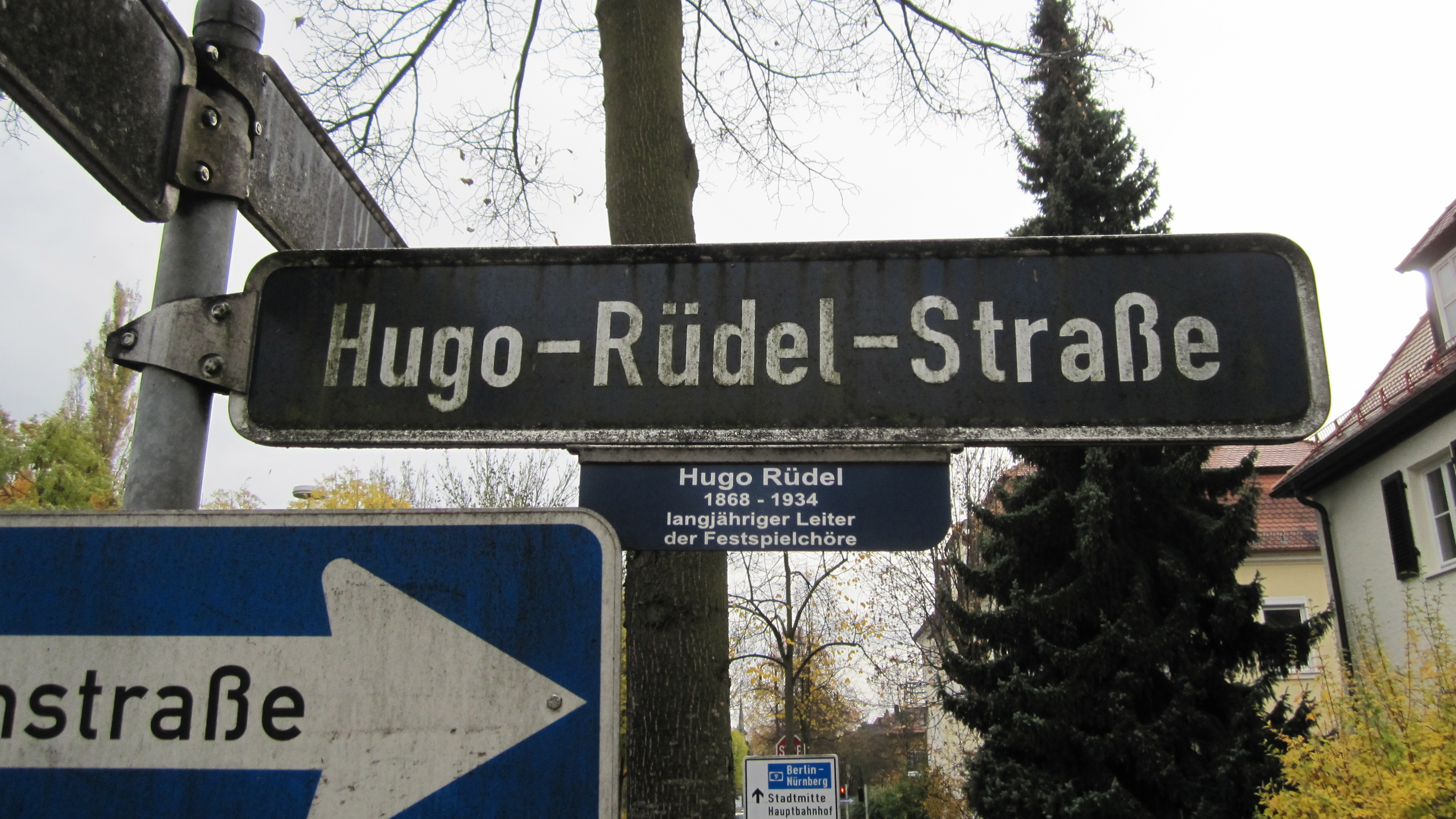
Road sign on the Hugo-Rüdel-Straße in Bayreuth.

In Bayreuth, not far from the Festspielhaus, a street was named after Hugo Rüdel.

== Quotes ==
As director of the Royal Cathedral Choir, the aforementioned has worked tirelessly for years to raise the choir's achievements to an artistic level that has hardly been reached before. These achievements have received the warmest recognition far beyond the borders of Germany.

Rüdel was awarded the cross Königlicher Hausorden von Hohenzollern on 22 March 1918.

== Sound and picture documents ==
Rüdel recorded numerous records with all major labels in the twenties with the Staats- und Domchor and the Berliner Lehrer-Gesangverein; recordings were made in Bayreuth in 1927. In a film made at the Bayreuth Festival in 1934 he can be seen at a choir rehearsal.
