= Marie Nicole Simonin Pollet =

Marie Nicole Simonin Pollet (4 May 1787 - March 1864) was a French composer, harpist and teacher who toured internationally and wrote a method for harp as well as several original compositions for the instrument.

Pollet was born in Paris. Her father, Jean Baptiste Simonin, was a luthier who invented an unspecified mechanism for harp. She studied harp with P. P. Blattman (a pseudonym used by Pierre Philibert Dufeuille) and Martin Pierre d'Alvimare.

Pollet’s personal life was not well documented. Her husband is variously described as the guitarist L. M. Pollet (b. 1783) or the harpist, composer and music publisher Jean Joseph Benoit Pollet (b. 1753). Her son Joseph Pollet (b. 1803) became an organist and music director at Notre Dame in Paris. She performed a harp duet for four hands with her son Carl (b. 1806) in Germany in 1812.

Pollet’s first concert performance was in 1808. In 1812 she went on concert tours in Germany and Austria. From November 1812 through November 1813 she was the harpist in the Theater an der Wien (Vienna) orchestra. In 1815 she toured Poland and Russia, then in 1826 toured Italy.

In correspondence dated 27 February 1812, Johann Wolfgang von Goethe conveyed Pollet’s “best regards and wishes” to German composer Carl Friedrich Zelter. On 14 April 1812, Zelter informed Goethe that Pollet would give a concert on 29 April and “would probably draw a good audience.” He planned to take her to the Singakademie in Berlin.

Pollet taught many harp students. She produced a method book for harp as well as original compositions which included several sets of variations and probably some songs. She died in Châtillon-sur-Seine in March 1864.
