= Carl Friedrich Rungenhagen =

German composer and teacher (1778–1851)

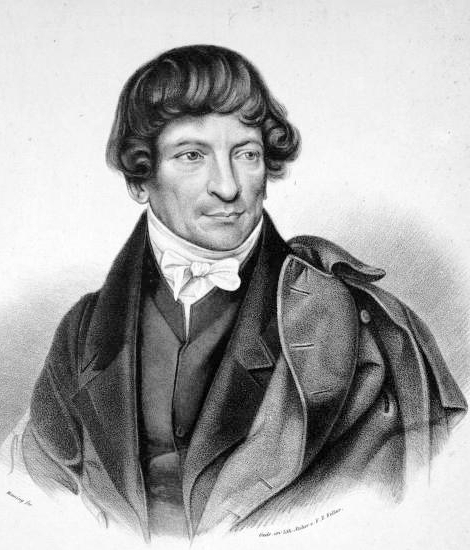
- Born: 27 September 1778; Berlin, Kingdom of Prussia
- Died: 21 December 1851 (aged 73); Berlin
- Occupations: Composer; conductor; academic teacher
- Organizations: Sing-Akademie zu Berlin; Prussian Academy of Arts

Carl Friedrich Rungenhagen (first name also sometimes given as Karl; 27 September 1778 – 21 December 1851) was a German composer and academic teacher at the Prussian Academy of Arts in Berlin.

== Life ==
Born in Berlin on 27 September 1778, Rungenhagen abandoned early study of art under Daniel Chodowiecki and joined his father's trading company. He worked there from 1796 to his father's death, after which he devoted himself entirely to music.

Rungenhagen became a member of the Sing-Akademie zu Berlin in 1801 and was a student of Carl Friedrich Zelter. In 1815 he became its deputy director, and took over its management in 1833 as successor to Zelter. Rungenhagen's election to his post by the Akademie's General Assembly was not without controversy. Among the competitors was Zelter's pupil Felix Mendelssohn. Mendelssohn's famous successful revival of Bach's St Matthew Passion at the Akademie in 1829 proved insufficient for him to win the post, despite the fact that Felix and the members of the Mendelssohn family had for many years sung in, and supported, the Akademie. Some have supposed that Rungenhagen's success was due to anti-Jewish sentiment. The loss of the election may have motivated Mendelssohn to turn his back on Berlin.

As Director of the Akademie, Rungenhagen continued the revival of the music of Bach; in 1833 he conducted the first performance of Bach's St John Passion after Bach's death. In 1835 he performed an almost complete performance of Bach's Mass in B minor. Rungenhagen devoted himself to the oratorios of Handel, with five performances in 1840, but also performed contemporary oratorios, including Ruth by his student Karl Anton Eckert and his own Judith. He conducted 30 new oratorios with the Sing-Akademie. As a composer, he created mostly church music, oratorios, cantatas and songs.

Rungenhagen also worked at the Prussian Academy of Arts in Berlin as a music pedagogue, appointed professor in 1843. Amongst his students were Albert Lortzing, Louis Lewandowski, Stanisław Moniuszko, August Conradi and Alexander Fesca. See: List of music students by teacher: R to S#Carl Friedrich Rungenhagen. Rungenhagen was also a member of a Masonic Lodge in Berlin.

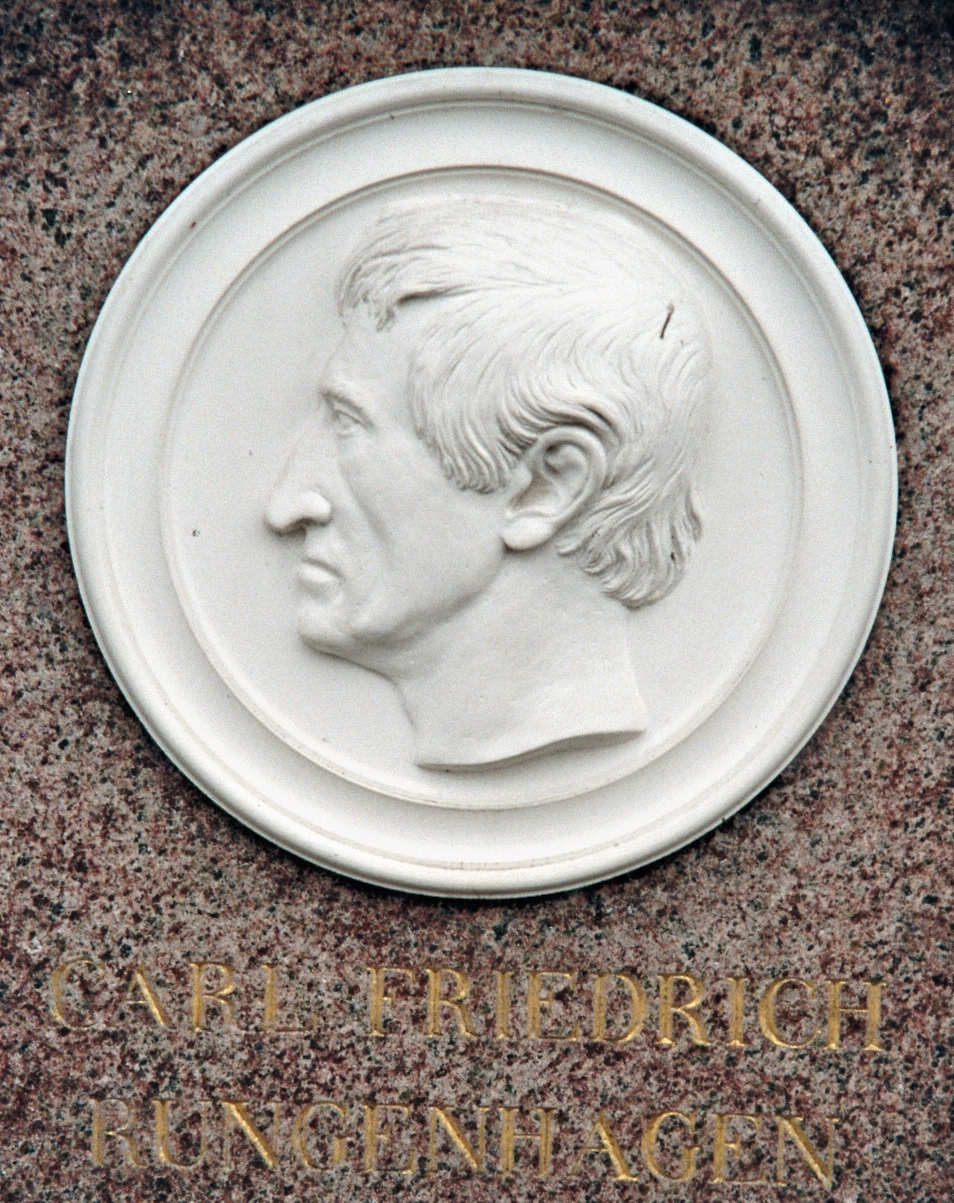
Detail of his grave stone

Rungenhagen died at the age of 73 in Berlin on 21 December 1851, and was buried in the Dorotheenstadt cemetery. His successor as director of the Akademie was Eduard Grell.

== Selected works ==
- Aus der Tiefe ruf' ich, Herr (Psalm 130) for soprano, four-part choir and organ or piano
- Friedens-Cantate, Berlin, printed at W. Dieterici, 1816
- Te Deum, Berlin, printed at W. Dieterici, 1816
- Stabat mater dolorosa (with Latin and German text) for two soprano and one alto soloist, Op. 24, Berlin, Trautwein, 1826
- Christi Einzug in Jerusalem, 1834

== Notes and references ==
Notes

Sources

- Eitner, Robert (1889), "Rungenhagen, Karl Friedrich", in Allgemeine Deutsche Biographie, vol.29. (In German). In German Wikisource at this URL. Accessed 3 Feb 2013.
- Mercer-Taylor, Peter (2000). The Life of Mendelssohn. Cambridge: Cambridge University Press. ISBN 0-521-63972-7.
