= Charge of the Uhl'ans =

"Charge of the Uhlans"

Song
- Language: English
- Published: 1905
- Composer: Carl Bohm

Charge of the Uhlans is a music score for piano composed by Carl Bohm. The song was published around 1905 by Eclipse Pub. Co., in Philadelphia, Pennsylvania.

The sheet music can be found at the Pritzker Military Museum and Library as well as Temple University's Library.
