= Gustav Heuser =

German composer and music journalist

Gustav Heuser (15 October 1817 – 8 October 1846) was a German composer and music journalist.

== Life ==
Born in Herzkamp (today part of Sprockhövel), Heuser was the son of a teacher and attended the Wilhelm-Dörpfeld-Gymnasium. There, he belonged to the youth friends of Friedrich Engels. On 18 March 1837 he left the Gymnasium to study at the Royal Music Institute of Berlin. At the same time, he took composition lessons with Adolf Bernhard Marx and was soon considered a great talent.

In 1840 Engels wrote the opera libretto Cola di Rienzo, which Heuser did not set to music, however. Marx brought on August 3, 1841 in the Humboldt University of Berlin Chorwerke Heusers zur Aufführung. On 18 November 1841 Heuser was recommended by Marx to Robert Schumann. He addressed Schumann himself the same day and subsequently wrote several essays for the Neue Zeitschrift für Musik in which he discussed fundamental questions of contemporary music. His hope that Schumann could also help him to publish his compositions, however, was not fulfilled. On 22 August 1844, he paid Schumann a personal visit in Leipzig, during which his further collaboration for the Neue Zeitschrift für Musik was probably discussed. Still in the issue of November 7, 1846, "Mr. Gustav Heuser in Berlin" is expressly referred to as "our collaborator".

In 1846, he sent several musical manuscripts to an alleged publisher named Conrad Löffler, who was soon exposed as a fraud, because Löffler had Heuser's works performed in Vienna under his own name: three string quartets on 26 July and, on 13 August in the Theater an der Wien, Heuser's Ouverture triumphale, together with a symphony by August Conradi, which Löffler also passed off as his own work.

Among those who fell for Löffler's tricks was Richard Wagner, who sent Löffler his operas Rienzi, The Flying Dutchman and Tannhäuser in the belief that Löffler would publish them.

On 19 September 1846, Heuser attended the premiere of Michael Beers Struensee with music by Giacomo Meyerbeer and was seen for the last time the following day. His body was recovered from the Spree in October. It was suspected that he died voluntarily, because "he had left his watch and purse in his apartment".

In Elberfeld on 16 March 1850, the organist and music teacher August Weinbrenner performed a "festive overture (manuscript)" by the "ingenious, unfortunately too soon passed away G. Heuser – including the Ouverture triomphale.

== Compositions ==
- op. 1: Lieder eines Lebendigen after texts by Georg Herwegh for bass and piano, Zürich: Robert Geyser, 1843
- op. 2: Geburtstags- und Weihnachtsmusik für Sopran, Alt, Tenor und Bass mit Begleitung des Pianoforte und sechs Kinderinstrumenten (Kuckuck, Trompete, Trommel, Knarre, Becken, Waldteufel), after a text by M. Wolff, Berlin: Schlesinger, 1844
- Ouverture triomphale, circa 1846
- Drei Streichquartette, circa 1846

== Writings ==
- Welche praktischen Resultate sind von der neuen Compositionslehre, der alten Theorie gegenüber, zu erwarten?, in Neue Zeitschrift für Musik, vol. 15, Nr. 51, dated 24 December 1841, p. 201f.
- Das moderne Pianoforte, in Neue Zeitschrift für Musik, vol. 17, Nr. 49, dated 16 December 1842, pp. 199–202; Nr. 50 dated 20 December 1842, pp. 203–205; Nr. 51, dated 23 December 1842, pp. 207–210 and Nr. 52 dated 27 December 1842, pp. 211–214
- Oratorium und Oper, in Neue Zeitschrift für Musik, vol. 21, Nr. 41, dated 18 November 1844, p. 161f; Nr. 45 vom 2. Dezember 1844, S. 177f.; Nr. 46, dated 5 December 1844, p. 181f.; Nr. 47, dated 9 December 1844, p. 185f.; Nr. 48 vom 12. Dezember 189f.; Nr. 49, dated 16 December 1844, p. 193f.; Nr. 50, dated 19 December 1844, p. 197f. and Nr. 52, dated 26 December 1844, p. 206f.
