= Vom Himmel hoch, o Engel, kommt =

German Christmas carol

- Christmas carol
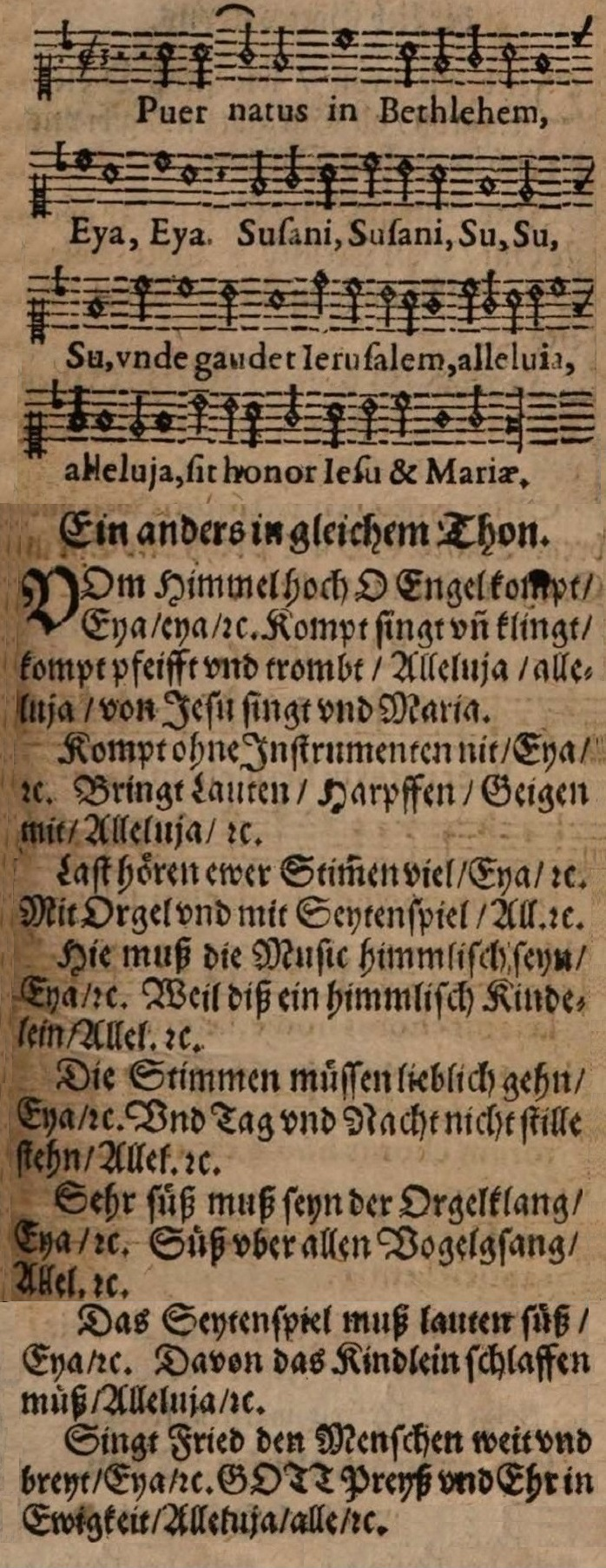
- A 1630 of Puer natus in Bethlehem with "Vom Himmel kompt / O Engel kompt" as an alternate text to the same melody
- English: From Heaven on High the Angels Sing
- Text: attributed to Friedrich Spee
- Language: German
- Melody: "Puer natus in Bethlehem"
- Published: 1622

"Vom Himmel hoch, o Engel, kommt" ("From Heaven on High the Angels Sing", literally: From Heaven on high, O angels, come), also known as "Susani", is a German Christmas carol. It was first printed in 1622 as an alternate text to an older melody. In eight stanzas of two lines each, the angels are requested to come from Heaven, bring their musical instruments, and play and sing of Jesus and Mary, and ultimately for peace for the people.

Different translations to English appear in various hymnals and in Maria von Trapp's book Around the Year with the Trapp family.

== History ==
The song appeared first as "Vom Himmel kompt / O Engel kompt" (From Heaven come, O angels come) in a Catholic collection of songs printed in Würzburg in 1622. Similar to the Advent song "O Heiland, reiß die Himmel auf", it belongs to a group of anonymous songs from the beginning of the 17th century which recent scholarship has attributed to Friedrich Spee, however without certainty. The song was reprinted in the 1623 hymnal Ausserlesene, catholische, geistliche Kirchengesäng of Jesuits in Cologne, by Peter von Brachel.

The song from the beginning of the Thirty Years' War may have been a reaction to the troubles of the war. The melody was derived from a version of "Puer natus in Bethlehem" which appeared in 1616 in a hymnal in Paderborn. Its Latin text was replaced by new poetry, while the repeated parts such as "Eia, susani" and "Alleluja" were kept.

The song was only rarely included in modern hymnals, such as some regional parts of the Protestant hymnal Evangelisches Gesangbuch (EG 542 in Bavaria and Thuringia, EG 538 in Hesse-Nassau, among others), and in the Cologne version of the Catholic hymnal Gotteslob as GL 736. The song was included in collections of the German Youth Movement, beginning in 1909 as "Vom Himmel hoch, O Englein kommt" in the Zupfgeigenhansl.

Several composers wrote choral settings of the song, including Carl Thiel, Hugo Distler, Rudolf Mauersberger and Erhard Mauersberger.

A translation "Come, Angels, Come! From Heaven Appear" was included in the Oxford Book of Carols (1928) and the New Oxford Book of Carols (1998). Another version, "From Heaven High, O Angels Come" was included by Maria von Trapp in her book Around the Year with the Trapp family. Other published translations include "From Heav'n on High, the Angels Sing" and "From Highest Heaven Come, Angels Come".

== Theme ==
The song invites the angels to come from Heaven to Earth to make music as cradle songs of the baby Jesus and his mother Mary. It comes from the tradition of Kindleinwiegen. In eight stanzas of two lines each, the angels are requested to come from Heaven, bring their instruments. While the first stanza mentions pipes and trumpets, the following two stanzas mention lutes, harps, violins, organ and strings. The following stanzas request that the music be heavenly, lovely and sweet. Each stanza ends with "sing of Jesus and Mary" ("von Jesus singt und Maria"). In the last stanza, the angels are requested to sing for peace for the people near and far, and praise God for ever.

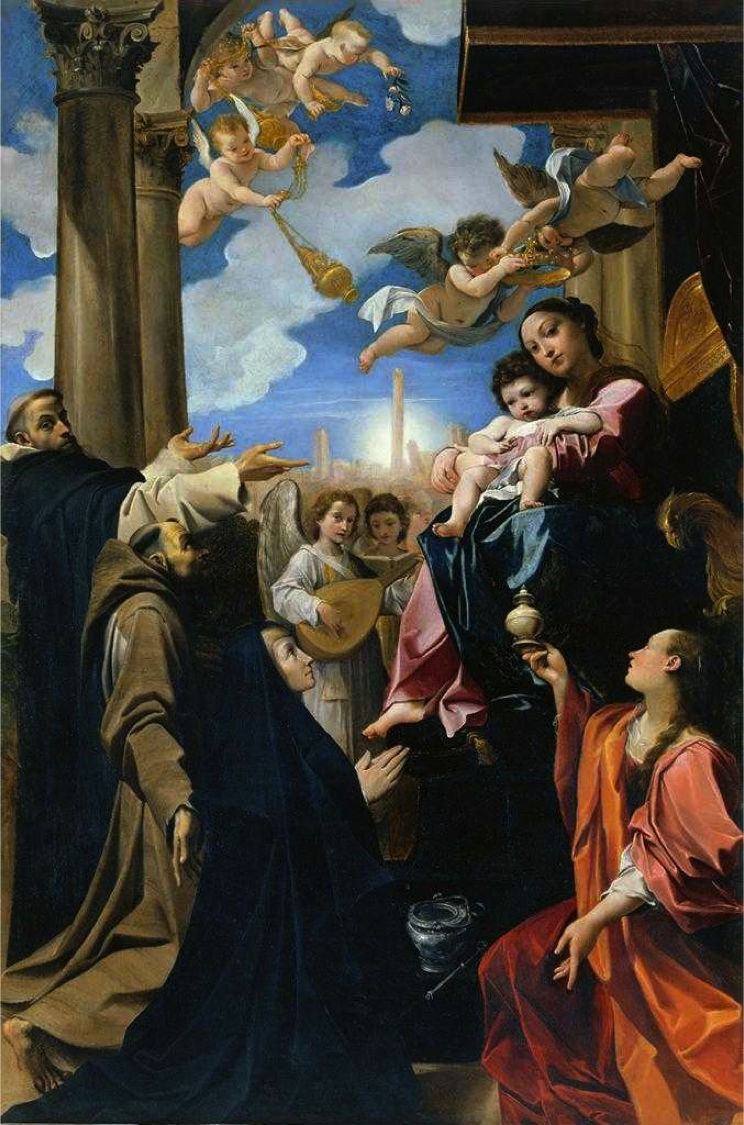
Ludovico Carracci: Madonna Bargellini

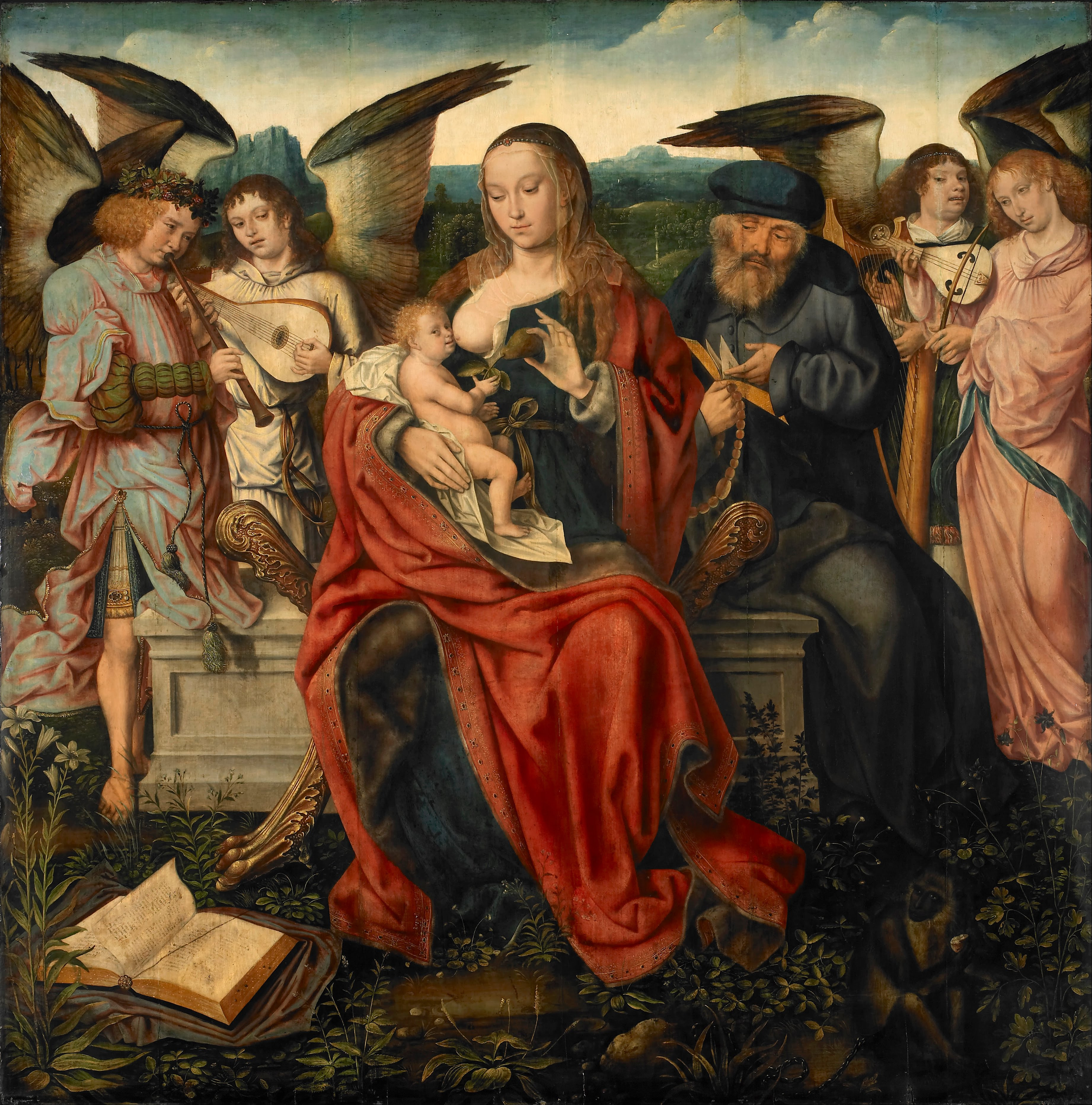
Holy Family with Music Making Angels, attributed to the Master of Frankfurt

1. Vom Himmel hoch, o Engel, kommt!
Eia, eia, susani, susani, susani,
kommt, singt und klingt, kommt, pfeift und trombt
Alleluja, alleluja.
Von Jesus singt und Maria.

2. Kommt ohne Instrumenten nit, eia ...
bringt Lauten, Harfen, Geigen mit. Alleluja ...

3. Lasst hören euer Stimmen viel, eia ...
mit Orgel- und mit Saitenspiel. Alleluja ...

4. Hier muss die Musik himmlisch sein, eia ...
weil dies ein himmlisch Kindelein. Alleluja ...

5. Die Stimmen müssen lieblich gehn, eia ...
und Tag und Nacht nicht stille stehn. Alleluja ...

6. Sehr süß muss sein der Orgel Klang, eia ...
süß über allen Vogelsang. Alleluja ...

7. Das Saitenspiel muss lauten süß, eia ...
davon das Kindlein schlafen muss. Alleluja ...

8. Singt Fried den Menschen weit und breit, eia ...
Gott Preis und Ehr in Ewigkeit. Alleluja ...

== Literature ==
- Ingeborg Weber-Kellermann: Das Buch der Weihnachtslieder. 10th edition. Atlantis, Zurich 2003, ISBN 3-254-08213-3, pp 58–59.

== See also ==
- List of Christmas carols
