= St. Sebastian Church, Berlin =

Church in Berlin, Germany

Coordinates: 52°32′16″N 13°23′01″E

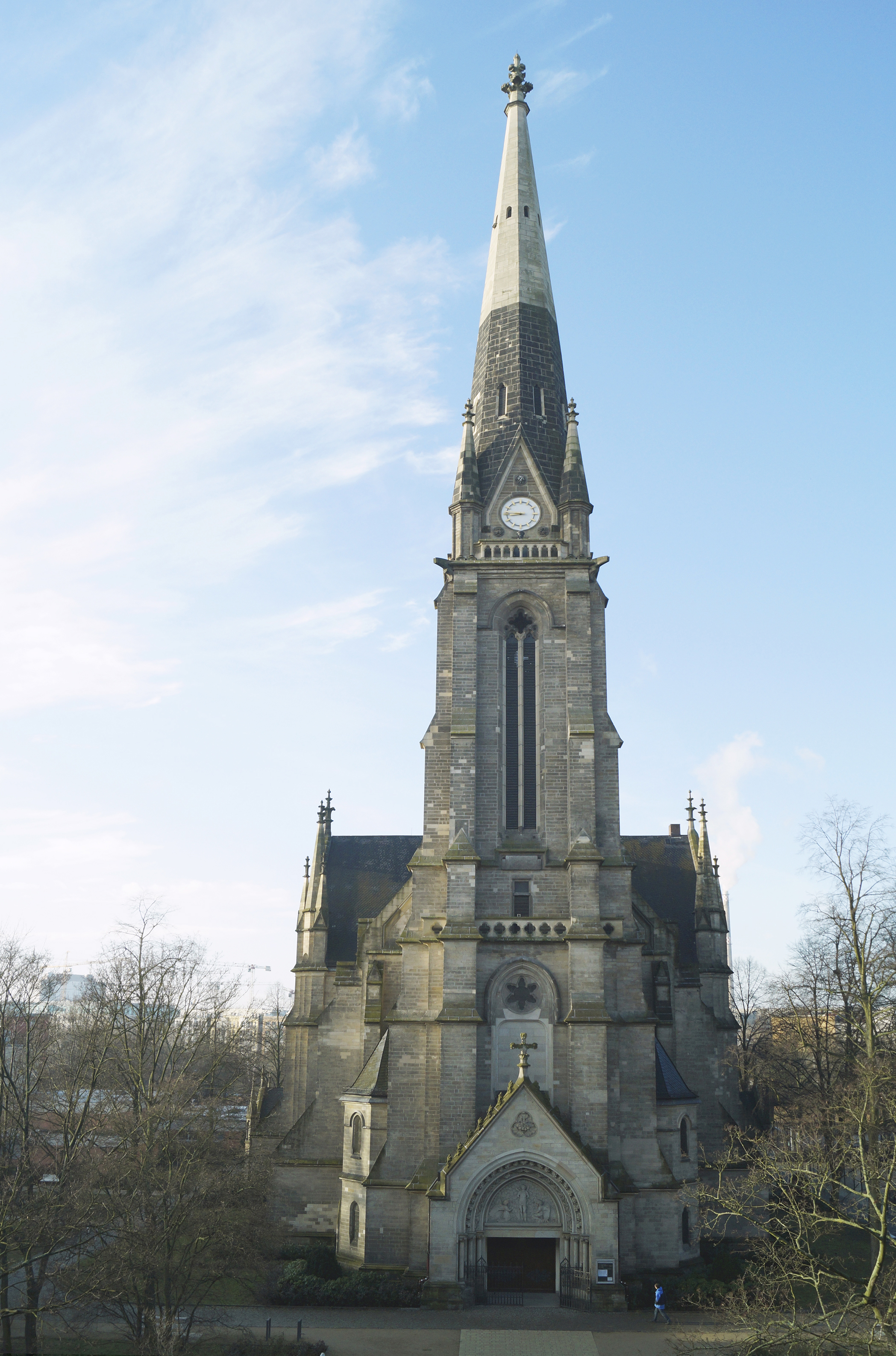

St. Sebastian or the Sebastiankirche is a neo-Gothic parish church and state monument on Gartenplatz in Berlin-Gesundbrunnen. It was built between 1890 and 1893 to have capacity for 1000 seats or 3000 standing. It now has a seated capacity of 600 and its parish shares it with the Croatian-speaking community of Berlin.

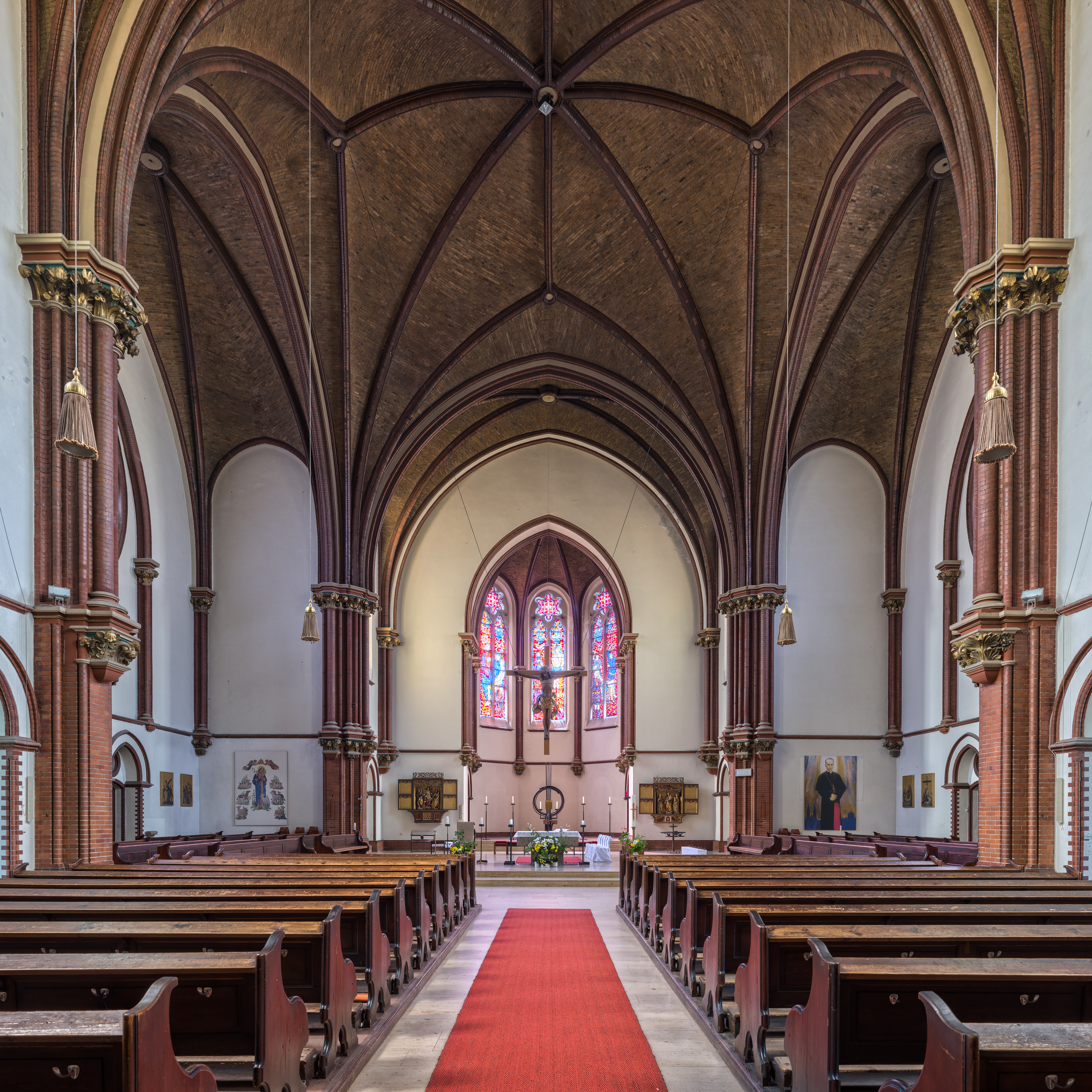
Nave

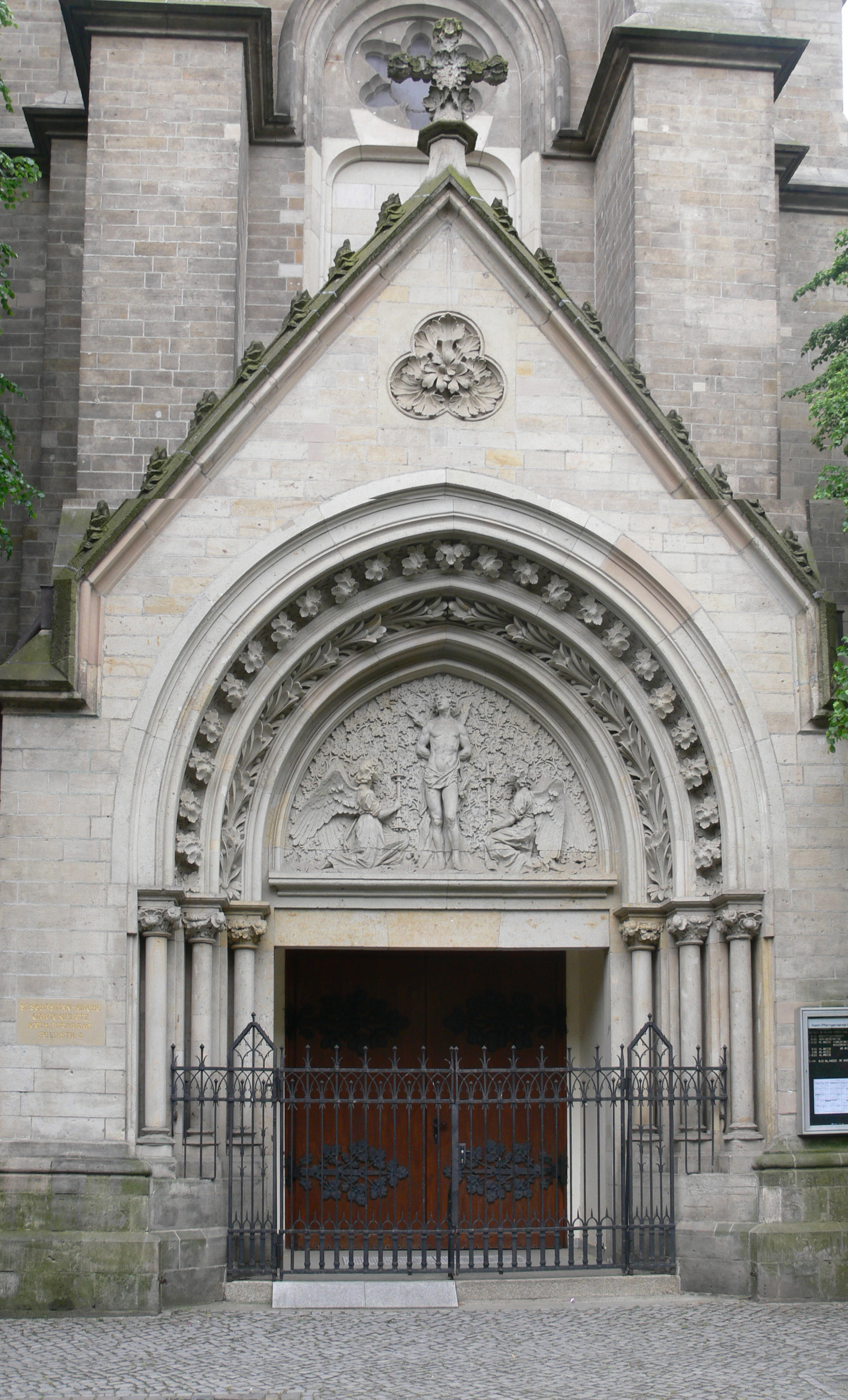
Garden square

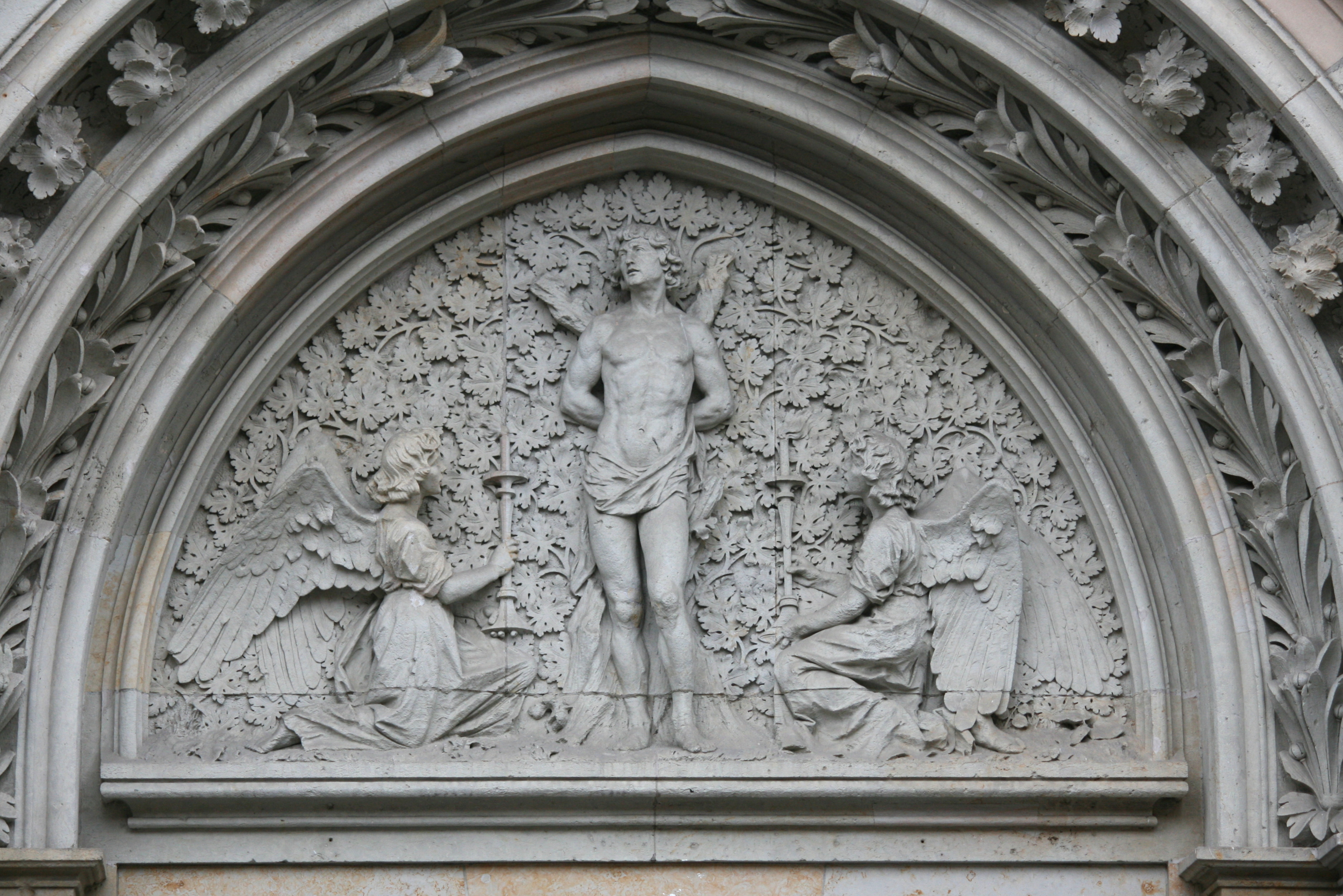
Above the main entrance

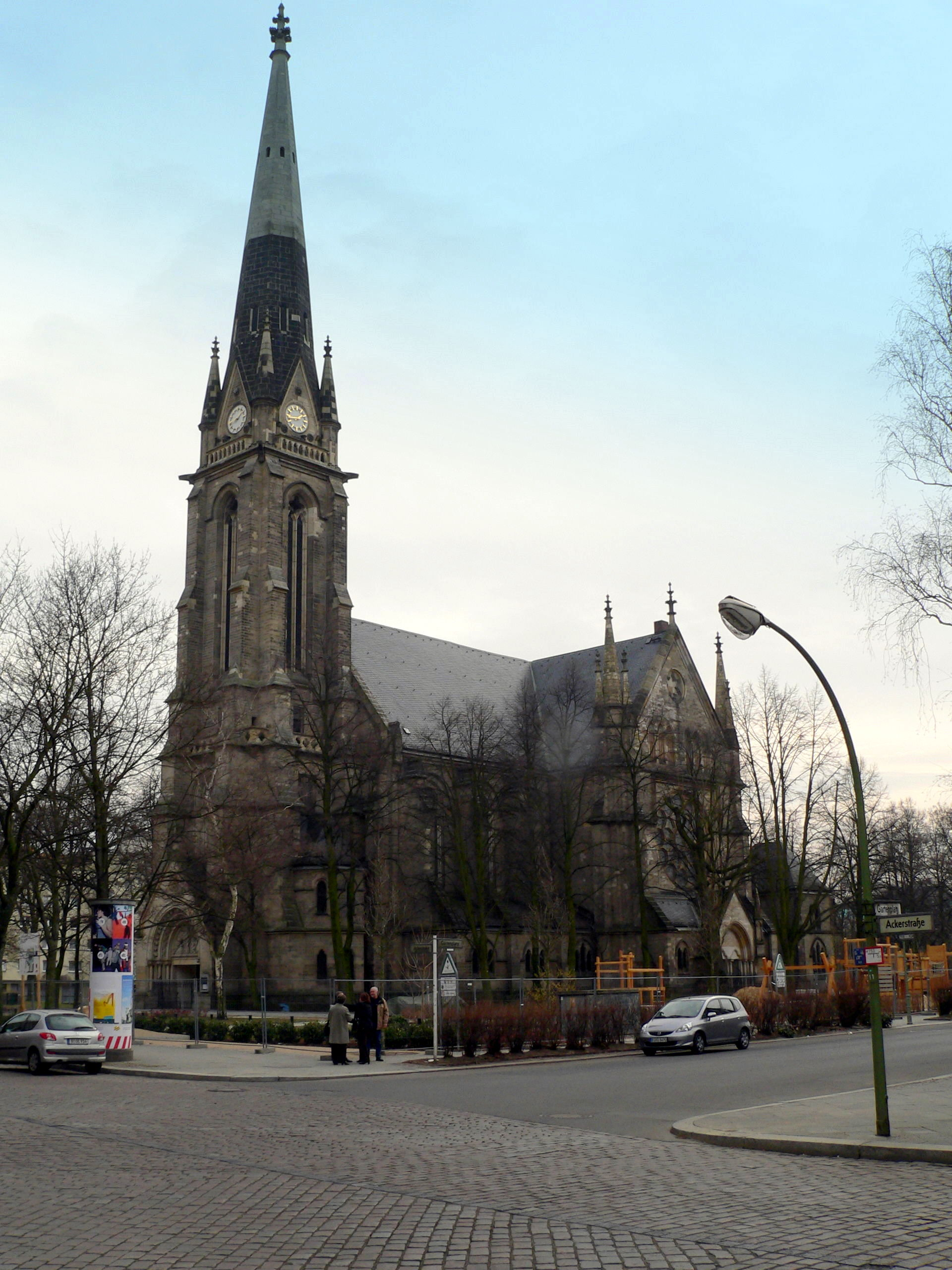
View of the church
