= Marconi-San Girolamo-Fesca =

Coordinates: 41.1366°N 16.8434°E

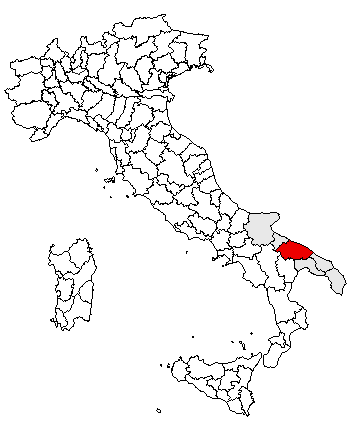
Location of the province of Bari

The Marconi-San Girolamo-Fesca, improperly named simply San Girolamo, is a quarter of Bari, the capital of Apulia. The quarter has about 12,900 residents.

== Geography ==
It covers an area of 6.3 km^{2} to the north of the city-centre between Libertà and Palese. The current boundaries of San Girolamo-Marconi-Fesca are:

- at north with the Adriatic Sea;
- at west with the strada vicinale Cola di Cagno that it separates itself from Palese-Macchie;
- at east with the quarter Libertà;
- at south with the railway road Bari-Foggia that it join itself together Stanic and San Paolo.
