= Johann Friedrich Naue =

German composer

Johann Friedrich Naue (November 17, 1787, in Halle (Saale) – May 19, 1858, in Halle) was a German composer, organist, and choir director and music theorist. He was a student of Ludwig van Beethoven and Daniel Gottlob Turk and Carl Friedrich Zelter. He composed both secular and spiritual music, and is known for reforming Protestant liturgical music in romantic-era Germany.

Naue studied music in Berlin. Along with Felix Mendelssohn, Naue took lessons from Carl Friedrich Zelter. Zelter exposed him to the music of Johann Sebastian Bach and George Frederic Handel. In 1808, he returned to Halle to study with Daniel Gottlob Türk. In 1815 Naue became a member of the Halle Masonic Lodge "of the three swords" along with Türk and Carl Loewe.

Naue went to Vienna to study briefly with Ludwig van Beethoven. On November 23, 1823 Beethoven dedicated his three-part canon "Kurz ist der Schmerz", WoO 163, to Naue. The text "Kurz ist der Schmerz und ewig ist die Freude" ("Brief is the pain and forever is the joy"), is from The Maid of Orleans by Friedrich von Schiller, the same poet who wrote the text for Beethoven's "Ode to Joy."

In 1829, Naue sold all of his books and spent all of his inheritance in order to finance a music festival in Halle. The festival was an economic failure that drove Naue to alcoholism. In 1833 he was fired as head of the singing academy he created. In 1835 he was fired as organist of the "Market Church of Our Lady." He eventually went blind and died in poverty in 1858.

While Naue was a well-regarded composer and theorist in his own time, his music is now rarely played. Nevertheless, Naue was a prolific composer of piano, organ, choral, and orchestral music. He often composed commissioned occasional or festive music, such as military and triumphal marches for the Prussian army.
