= Friedrich Ernst Fesca =

German violinist and composer (1789–1826)

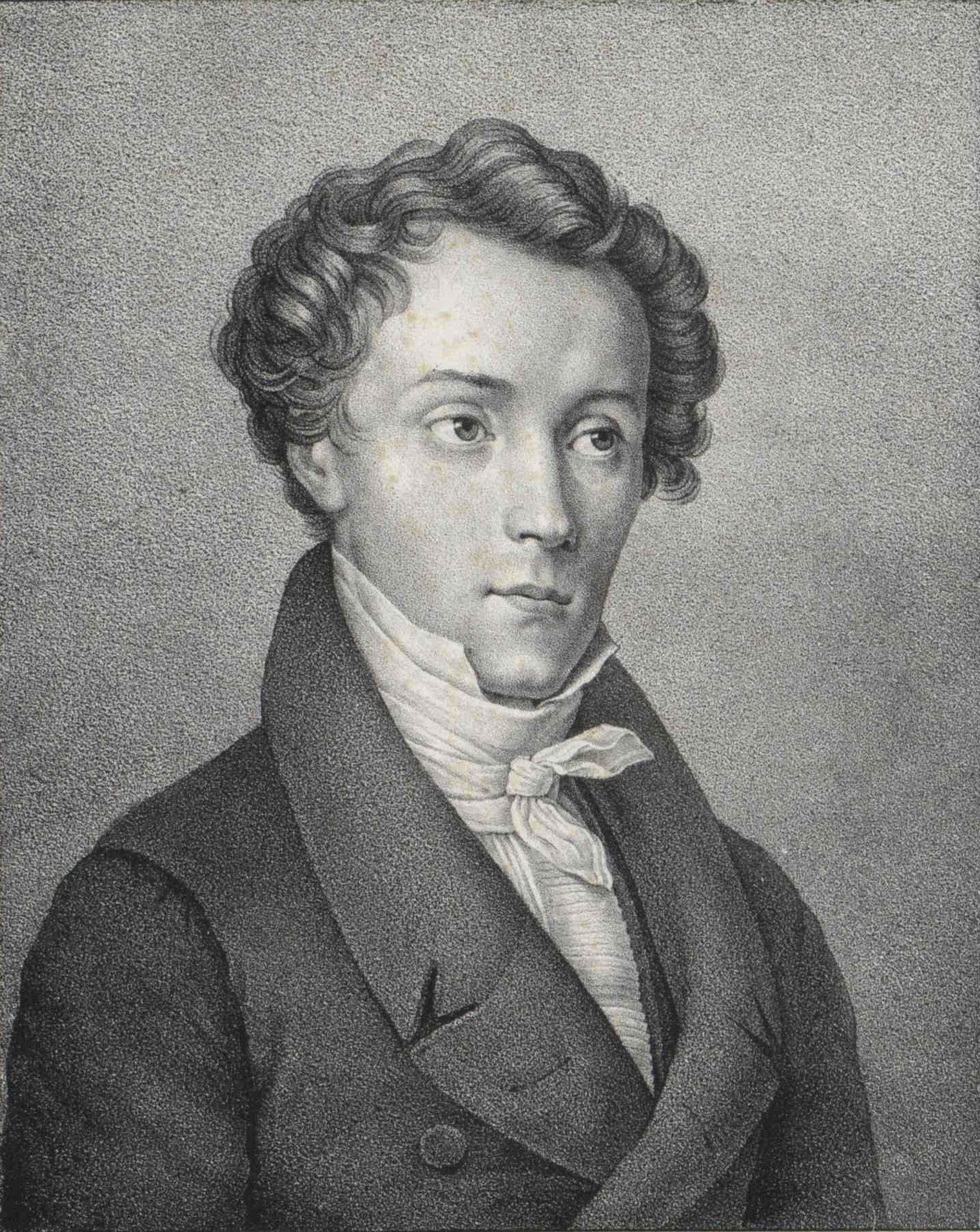

Background information
- Born: February 15, 1789
- Origin: Germany
- Died: May 24, 1826 (aged 37)
- Occupations: Violinistl and Composer

Friedrich Ernst Fesca (15 February 1789 – 24 May 1826) was a German violinist and composer of instrumental music of the late Classical and early Romantic periods.

== Life and career ==
He was born at Magdeburg. His father, Johann Peter August Fesca, was the market judge of Magdeburg and active in the musical part in the city; he devoted much of his time to the practice of the violoncello and piano. His mother was a singer educated under Johann Adam Hiller and Marianne Podleska; she had been a professional vocalist in early life.

Friedrich received his early musical education in Magdeburg and completed his studies at Leipzig under Thomaskantor August Eberhard Müller. When he was but four years of age, he could perform pieces of moderate difficulty upon the piano, and began the study of the violin. At the early age of fifteen he appeared before the public with several concertos for the violin, which were received with general applause, and resulted in his being appointed leading violinist of the Leipzig Gewandhaus Orchestra. This position he occupied till 1806, when he became concertmaster to the duke Peter I of Oldenburg. In 1808 he was appointed solo-violinist by King Jerome of Westphalia at state theater of Cassel, and there he remained till the end of the French occupation (1814), when he went to Vienna, and soon afterwards to Karlsruhe, having been appointed concertmaster to the grand duke of Baden.

His failing health prevented him from enjoying the numerous and well-deserved triumphs he owed to his art, and in 1826 he died of consumption at the early age of thirty-seven.

Fesca's son Alexander also achieved some note as a composer.

== Works ==
As a virtuoso, Fesca was ranked amongst the best masters of the German school of violinists, the school subsequently of Spohr and of Joachim. Especially as leader of a quartet he is said to have been unrivaled with regard to classic dignity and simplicity of style. Amongst his compositions, his quartets for stringed instruments and other pieces of chamber music are the most notable. His three symphonies (No. 1 in E♭, Op. 6; No. 2 in D, Op. 10; No. 3 in D, Op. 13) along with chamber works were still listed in Augener's catalog as late as 1861 His two operas, Cantemire and Omar and Leila, were less successful. He also wrote some sacred compositions, and numerous songs and vocal quartets.
