= Franz Fleckenstein =

German musician, priest and choir director

Franz Fleckenstein (8 June 1922 – 5 January 1996) was a German church musician, priest and composer.

== Life ==
Born in Würzburg, Fleckenstein studied church music in Regensburg and after the war additionally theology. In 1950 he was ordained a catholic priest. Later he was chaplain in Miltenberg. From 1953 he was music prefect in Würzburg. From 1960 he was cathedral vicar at Würzburg Cathedral and from 1961 to 1971 Domkapellmeister at the Würzburg Cathedral. During this time he founded the Würzburger Domsingknaben and in 1967 he and his choirs organized the reopening of the Würzburg Cathedral.

From 1970 he directed the renowned church music school in Regensburg, which since 2001 has been called Hochschule für Katholische Kirchenmusik und Musikpädagogik Regensburg.

From 1974 to 1984 Fleckenstein was state president of the choir association Allgemeiner Cäcilien-Verband für Deutschland and member of various church commissions.

In 1987 he retired, returned to Würzburg and took over a teaching position for church music at the Hochschule für Musik Würzburg.

Fleckstein died in Würzburg at the age of 73.

== Awards ==
- 1973: Monsignore-Titel des Vatikans
- 1983: Verdienstorden der Bundesrepublik Deutschland der Bundesrepublik Deutschland
- 1987: Albertus-Magnus-Medaille of the city of Regensburg
- 1988: Order of Merit of the Federal Republic of Germany 1st Class

== Literature ==
- Gloria Deo Pax Hominibus. Festschrift zum 100-jährigen Bestehen der Kirchenmusikschule Regensburg. (Publication series of the General Cäcilien Association. Volume 9). Bonn 1974.
- Gott loben, das ist unser Amt.
- Siegfried Koesler: Die Würzburger Dommusik in den ersten zwei Dritteln des 20. Jahrhunderts. In Dieter Kirsch, Ulrich Konrad (ed.): Kirchenmusik in der Diözese Würzburg – Studien und Quellen vom 16. bis ins 20. Jahrhundert. Schöningh, Würzburg 2010, ISBN 978-3-87717-070-0.
- List of 13 compositions in the German National Library.
