= August Wilhelm Bach =

German composer, organist (1796–1869)

- Born: 4 October 1796; Berlin, Germany
- Died: 15 April 1869 (aged 72) Berlin, Germany
- Genres: Sacred music, Keyboard music
- Occupations: Composer, Organist
- Instruments: Organ, Keyboard
- Years active: 1816–1869

August Wilhelm Bach (4 October 1796 – 15 April 1869), was a German composer and organist, from Berlin.

He studied with his father, Gottfried, as well as with Carl Friedrich Zelter and Ludwig Berger as well as at the Singing Academy in Berlin. In 1816 he served as an organist at St Mary's Church and from 1820 he taught organ and music theory at the Institute of Church Music set up by Zelter. In 1832, Bach succeeded Zelter as the director of the Royal Institute of Church Music in Berlin. He also taught at the Prussian Academy of Arts. His compositions largely consist of sacred works and works for keyboard. He also wrote a pipe organ method and a hymnbook.

He is unrelated to the family of Johann Sebastian Bach.

== See also ==
- See: List of music students by teacher: A to B#August Wilhelm Bach.
