= Carl Friedrich Zelter =

German composer

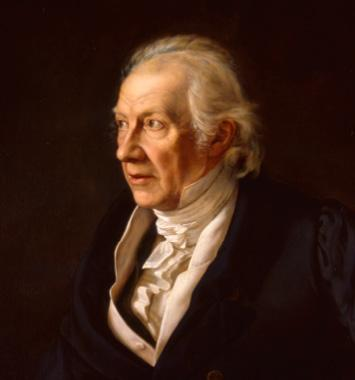
Carl Friedrich Zelter Portrait by Carl Begas

Carl Friedrich Zelter (11 December 1758 – 15 May 1832) was a German composer, conductor and teacher of music. Working in his father's bricklaying business, Zelter attained mastership in that profession, and was a musical autodidact.

== Biography ==
Zelter was born and died in Berlin. He became friendly with Johann Wolfgang von Goethe, and his works include settings of Goethe's poems. During his career, he composed about two hundred lieder, as well as cantatas, a viola concerto (performed as early as 1779) and piano music.

Amongst Zelter's pupils (at different times) were Felix Mendelssohn, Fanny Mendelssohn, Giacomo Meyerbeer, Eduard Grell, Otto Nicolai, Johann Friedrich Naue, and Heinrich Dorn. Felix Mendelssohn was perhaps Zelter's favorite pupil and Zelter wrote to Goethe boasting of the 12-year old's abilities. Zelter communicated his strong love of the music of J. S. Bach to Mendelssohn, one consequence of which was Mendelssohn's 1829 revival of Bach's St Matthew Passion at the Sing-Akademie under Zelter's auspices. This epochal event sparked a general re-evaluation and revival of Bach's works, which were then largely forgotten and regarded as old-fashioned and beyond resuscitation. Mendelssohn had hoped to succeed Zelter on the latter's death as leader of the Singakademie, but the post went instead to Carl Friedrich Rungenhagen.

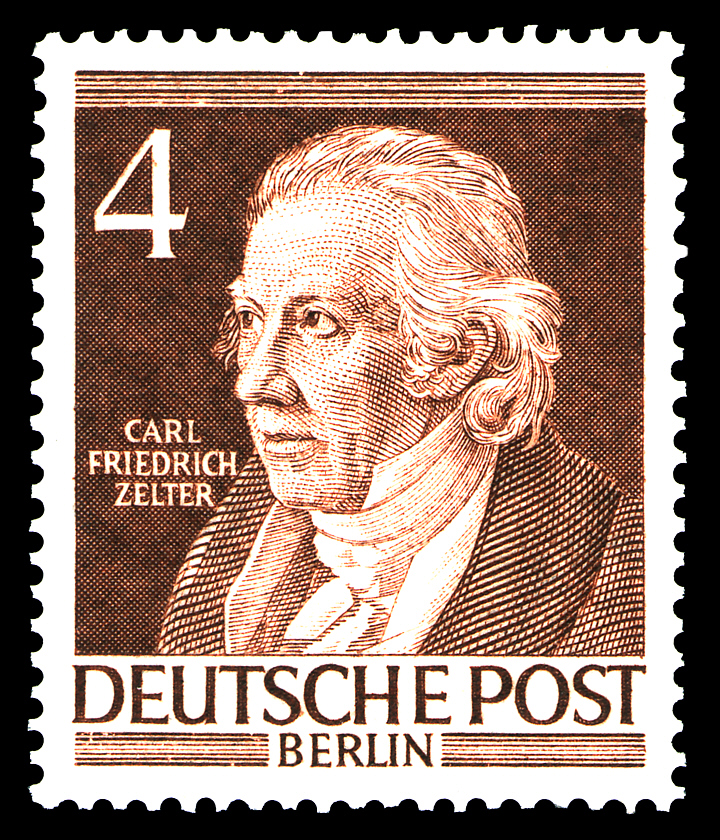
Postage stamp (1952) from the series Men from Berlin's Past

Zelter was married to Julie Pappritz in 1796, one year after his first wife, Sophie Eleonora Flöricke, née Kappel, had died. Pappritz was a well-known singer at the Berlin Opera. Zelter is buried at the Sophienkirche in Berlin. The violinist Daniel Hope (born 1973) is a direct descendant of Zelter.

Zelter was the author of a biography of Carl Friedrich Christian Fasch, first published in 1801 by J.F. Unger in Berlin. He was a mentor and friend of French harpist and composer Marie Nicole Simonin Pollet. The novelist Elizabeth Sara Sheppard portrayed Zelter as the character Aronach in her 1853 novel Charles Auchester.
