= Ludwig Berger (composer) =

German pianist and composer (1777–1839)

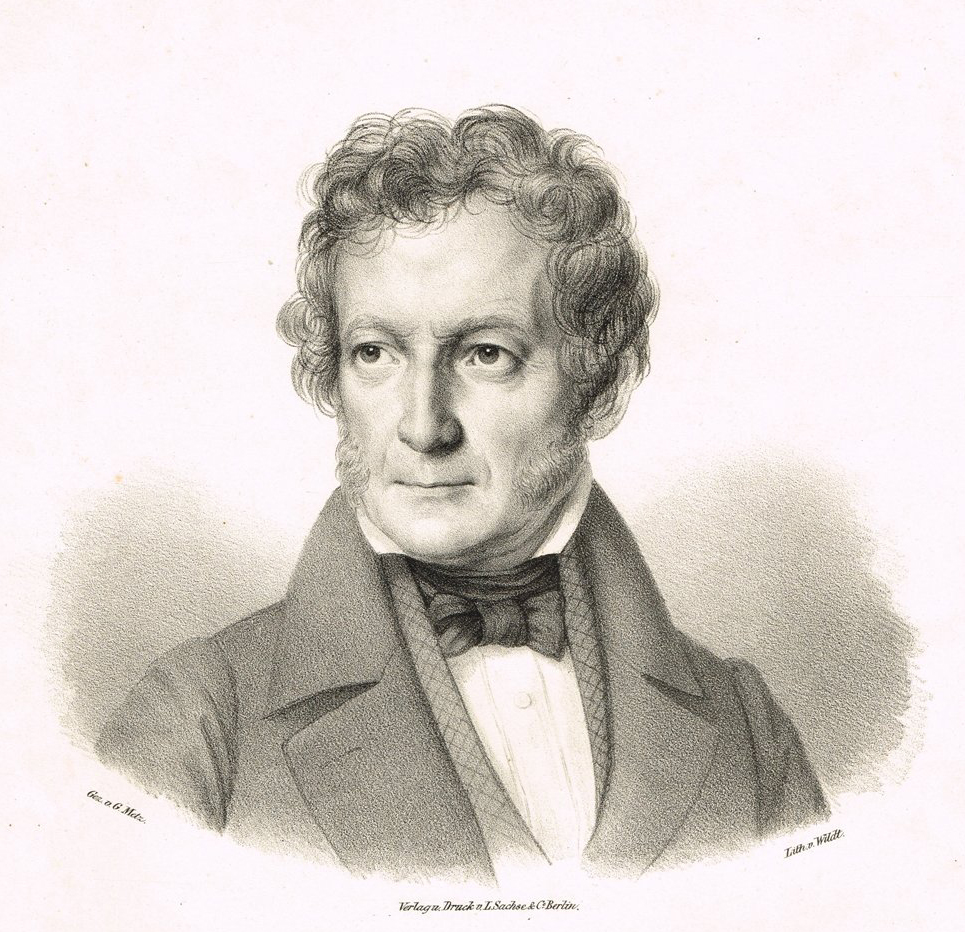
Portrait of Berger, 1820

Carl Ludwig Heinrich Berger (18 April 1777 – 16 February 1839) was a German pianist, composer, and piano teacher. He was born in Berlin, and spent his youth in Templin and Frankfurt, where he studied both flute and piano. Later, he studied composition with Joseph Augustin Gürrlich in Berlin. He became a pupil of the composer Muzio Clementi, and went with him to Russia, where he stayed for eight years. While in Russia, he married, but was widowed in less than a year. During the Napoleonic Wars, he fled to London, where his piano performances were well received. He returned to Berlin in 1814, and lived there for the rest of his life. A nervous disorder in his arm led to the end of his career as a piano virtuoso, and he built a reputation as a teacher, numbering Felix and Fanny Mendelssohn, as well as Taubert, Dorn, and August Wilhelm Bach among his more distinguished pupils. See List of music students by teacher: A to B § Ludwig Berger.

Berger wrote over 160 solo songs (for instance in 1816/17 a song-cycle "Die schöne Müllerin" based on a parlor game), as well as a piano concerto, seven piano sonatas, 29 studies, and several didactic piano works.

He died in Berlin in 1839.

== Sources ==
- Kershaw, Richard; Musgrave, Michael (2001). "Berger, Ludwig". Grove Music Online (8th ed.). Oxford University Press. doi:10.1093/gmo/9781561592630.article.02783. ISBN 978-1-56159-263-0. (subscription, Wikilibrary access, or UK public library membership required)
