= Eduard Grell =

German composer, conductor, choir director and music educator

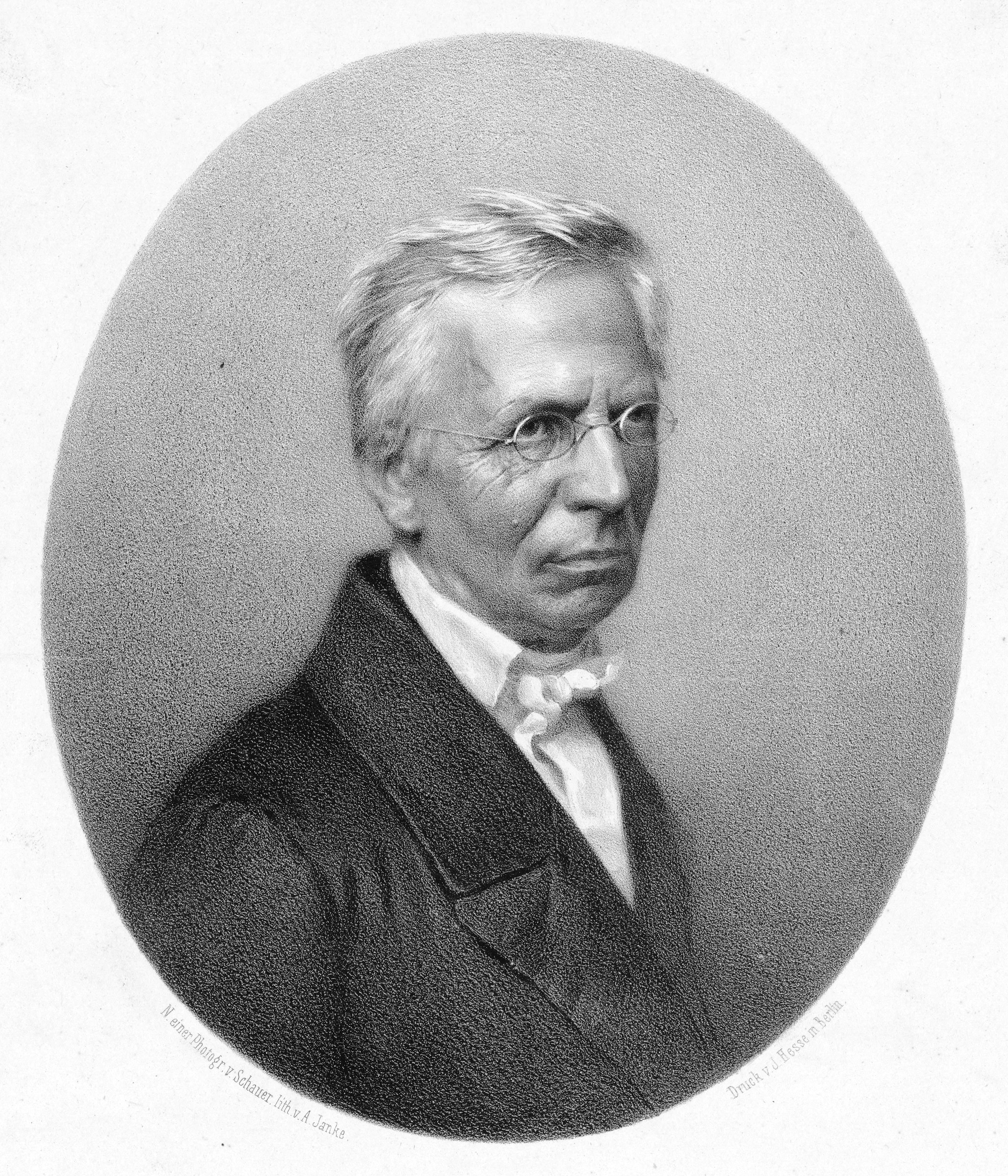
Lithograph of Grell

Eduard Grell or August Eduard Grell (6 November 1800 – 10 August 1886) was a German composer, organist, and music teacher.

Grell was born in Berlin. Among his early teachers were Carl Friedrich Zelter and Carl Friedrich Rungenhagen. On Zelter's recommendation, Grell became in 1817 the organist at the Nikolaikirche in Berlin; he also joined the Sing-Akademie zu Berlin of which he was a lifelong member, and director from 1853 to 1876, succeeding Rungenhagen. He also became in 1853 professor of composition at the Prussian Academy of Arts. In 1864 he was awarded the order "Pour le Mérite".

Grell's oeuvre includes three symphonies, three string quartets, and large amounts of vocal music. He is considered one of the leaders of the Palestrina renaissance in Europe. He was also the first to produce the Christmas Oratorio since the death of its composer, Johann Sebastian Bach.

== Selected works ==
- Die Israeliten in der Wüste, oratorio
- 16stimmige Messe, a cappella
- Pfingstlied für 3 Solo- und 4 Chorstimmen mit Begleitung des Pianoforte, Op. 11
- Drei kurze und leichte vierstimmige Motetten, men's chorus with organ or piano, Op. 13
- Zwei achtstimmige Motetten, Op. 22
- Drei Motetten für gemischten Chor, Op. 34
- Te deum laudamus, Op. 38
- Urfinsternis
