= List of German composers =

This is an alphabetical list of composers from Germany.

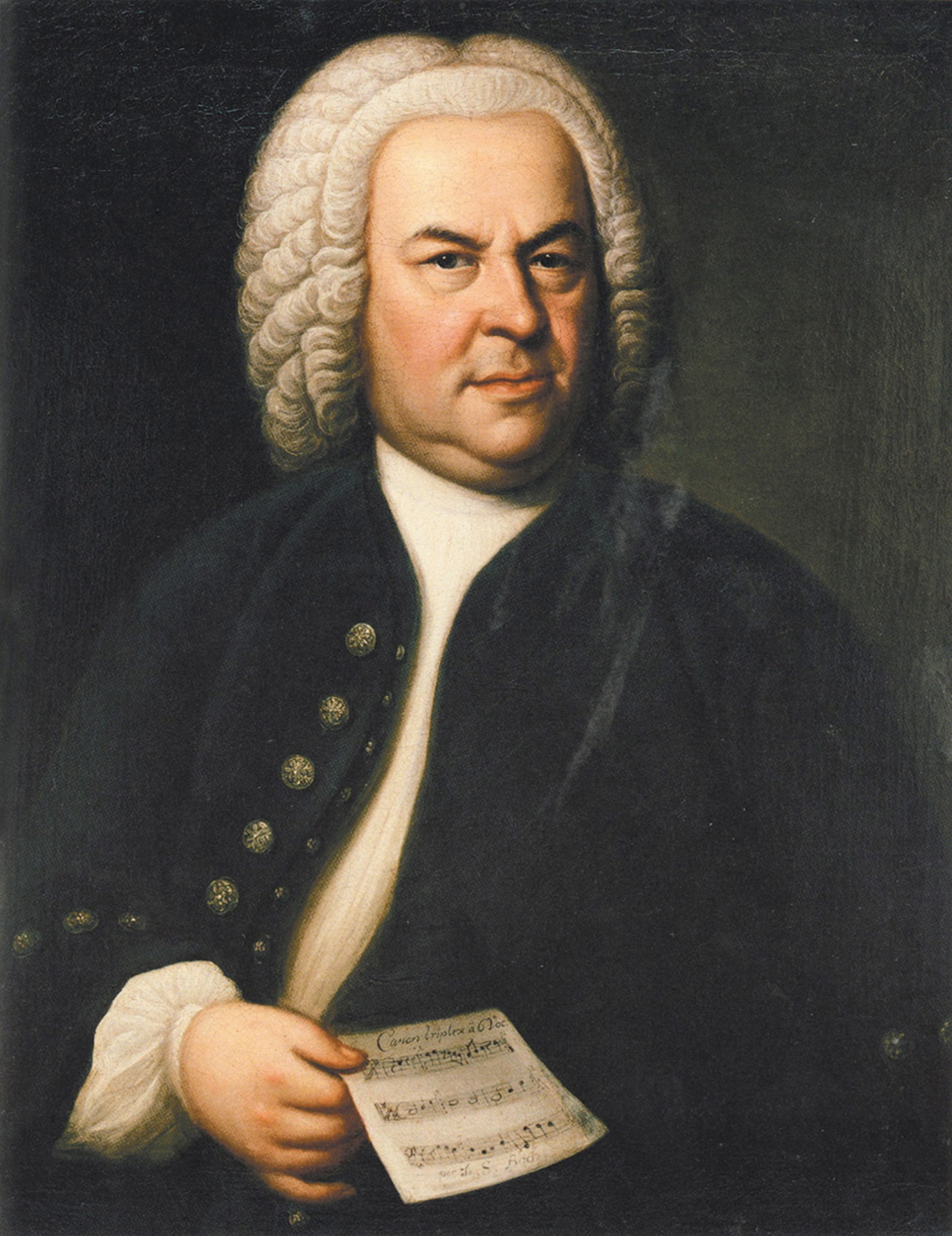
Bach

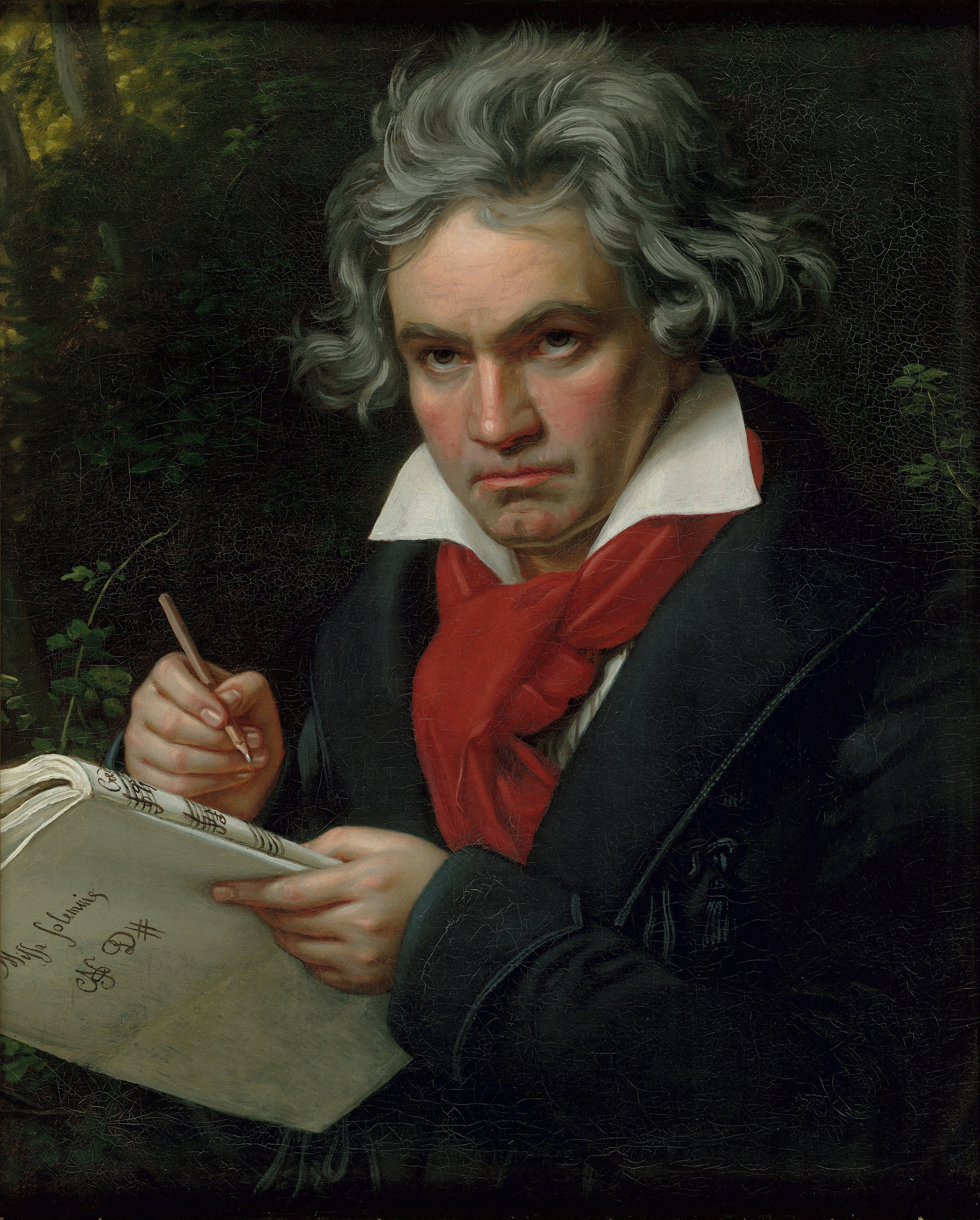
Beethoven

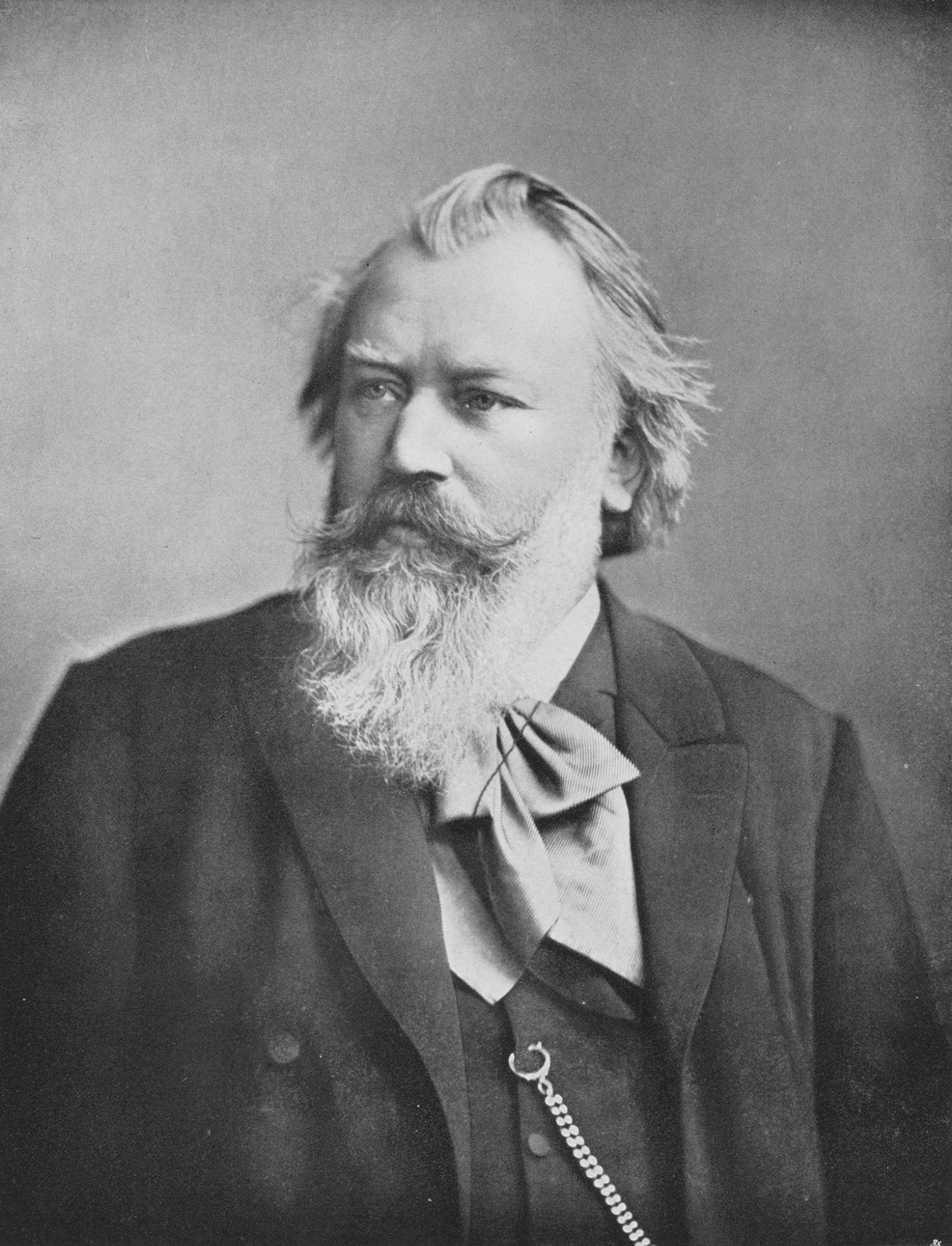
Brahms

Handel

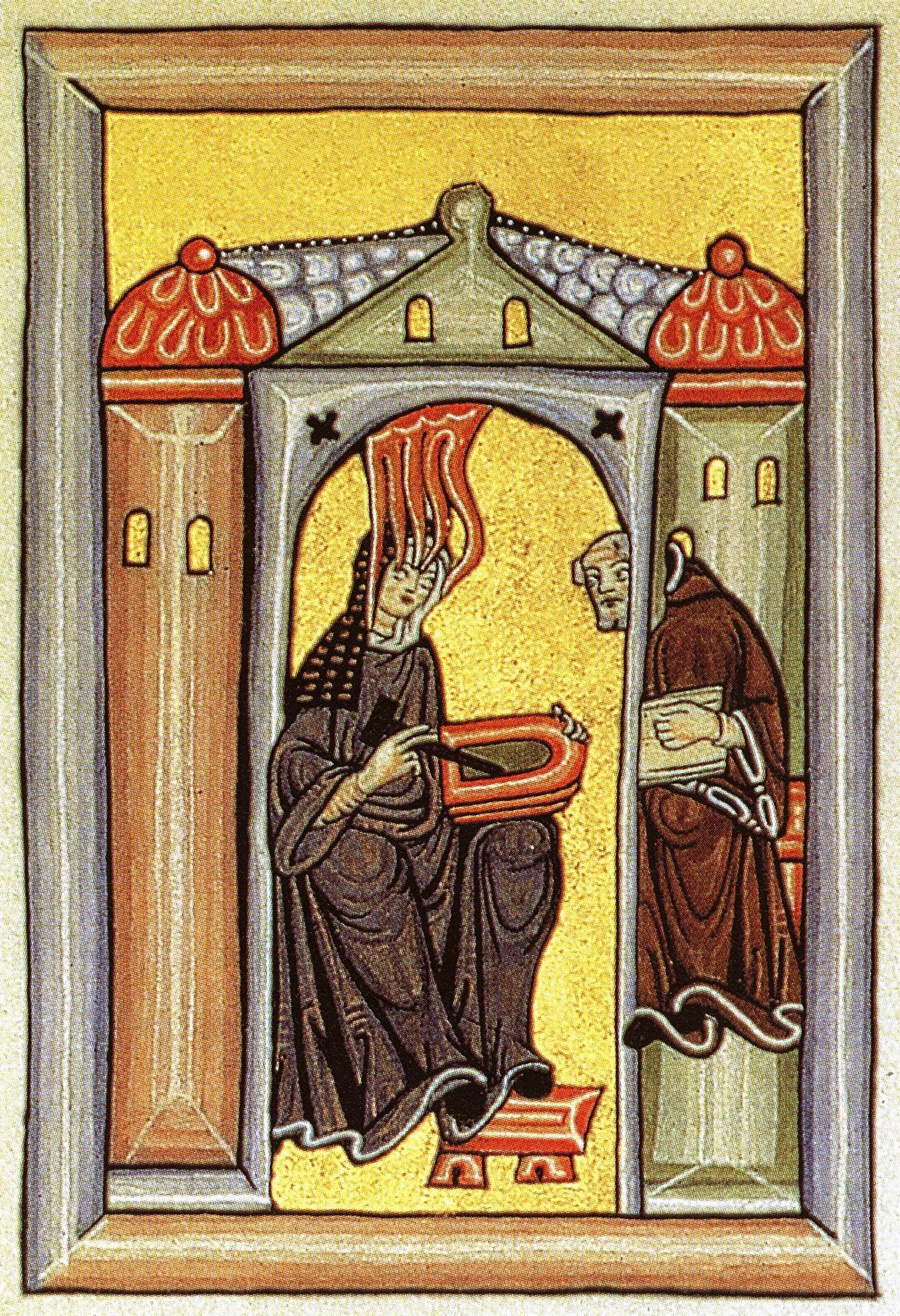
Hildegard von Bingen

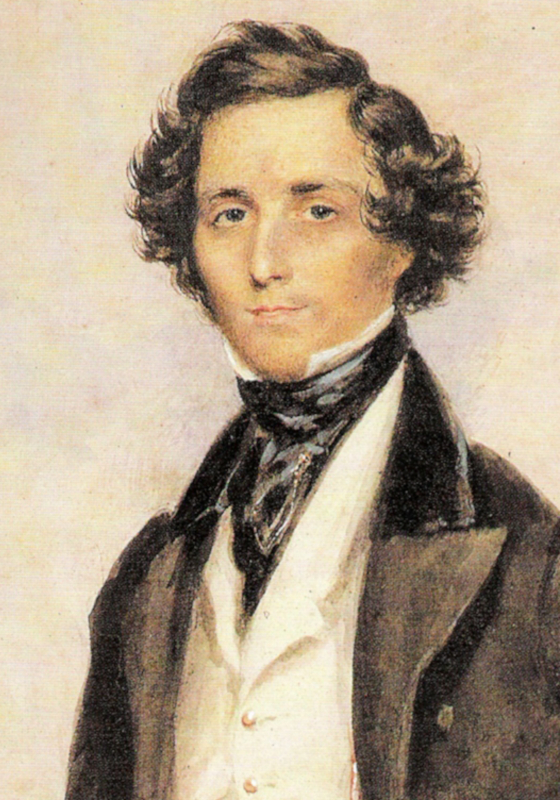
Mendelssohn

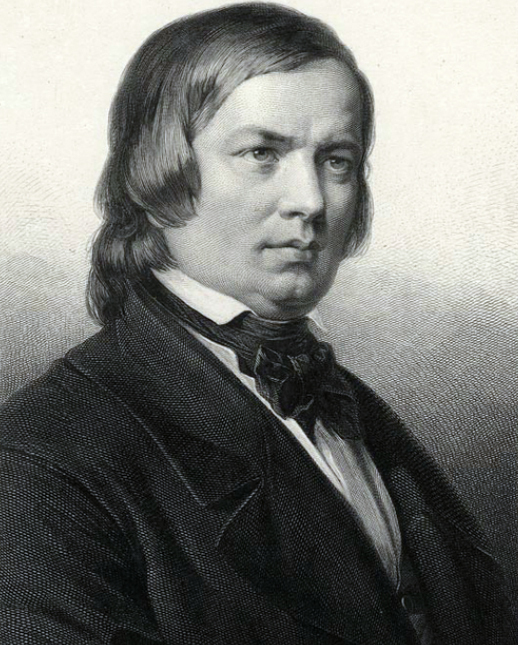
Schumann

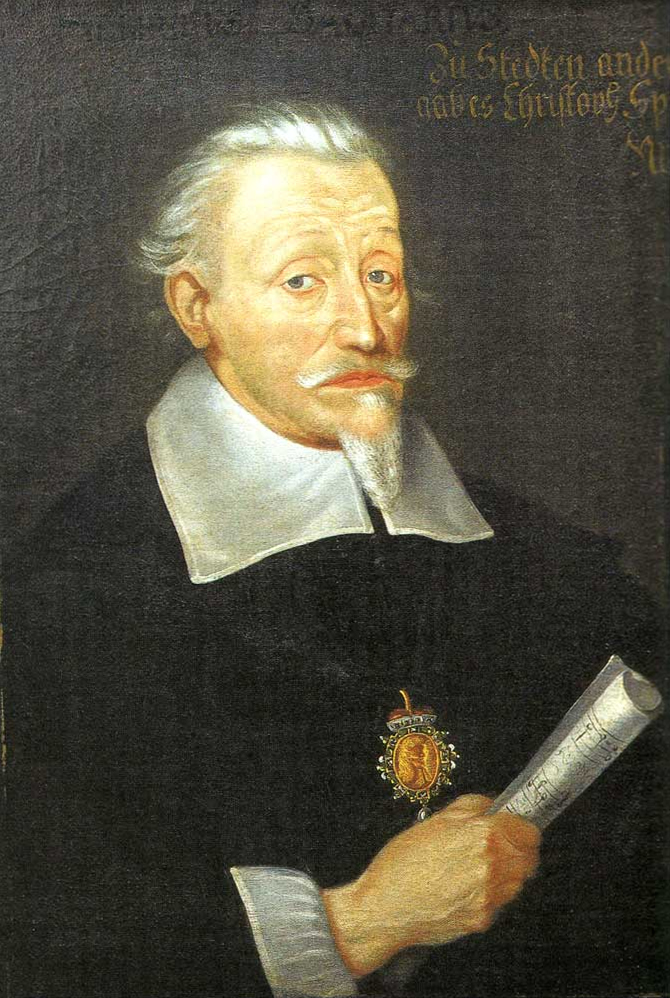
Schütz

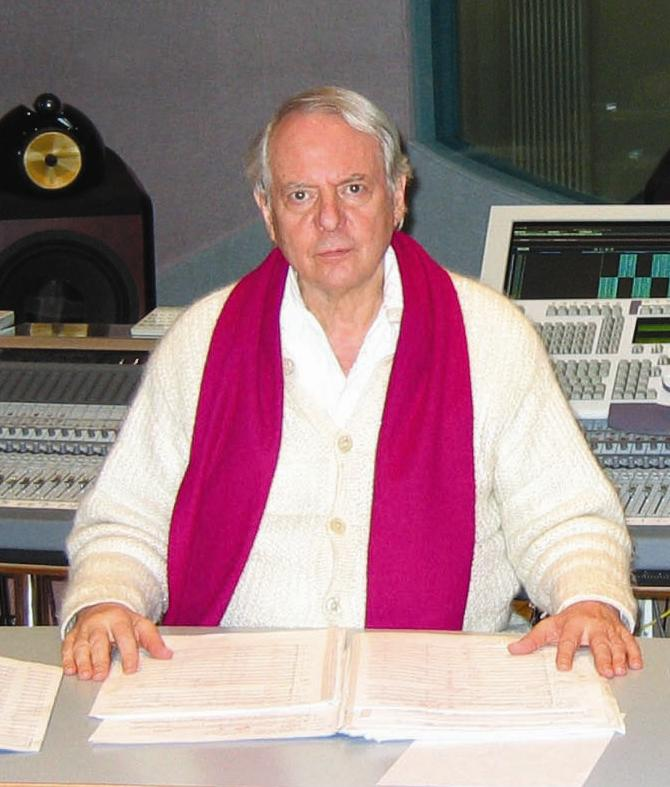
Stockhausen

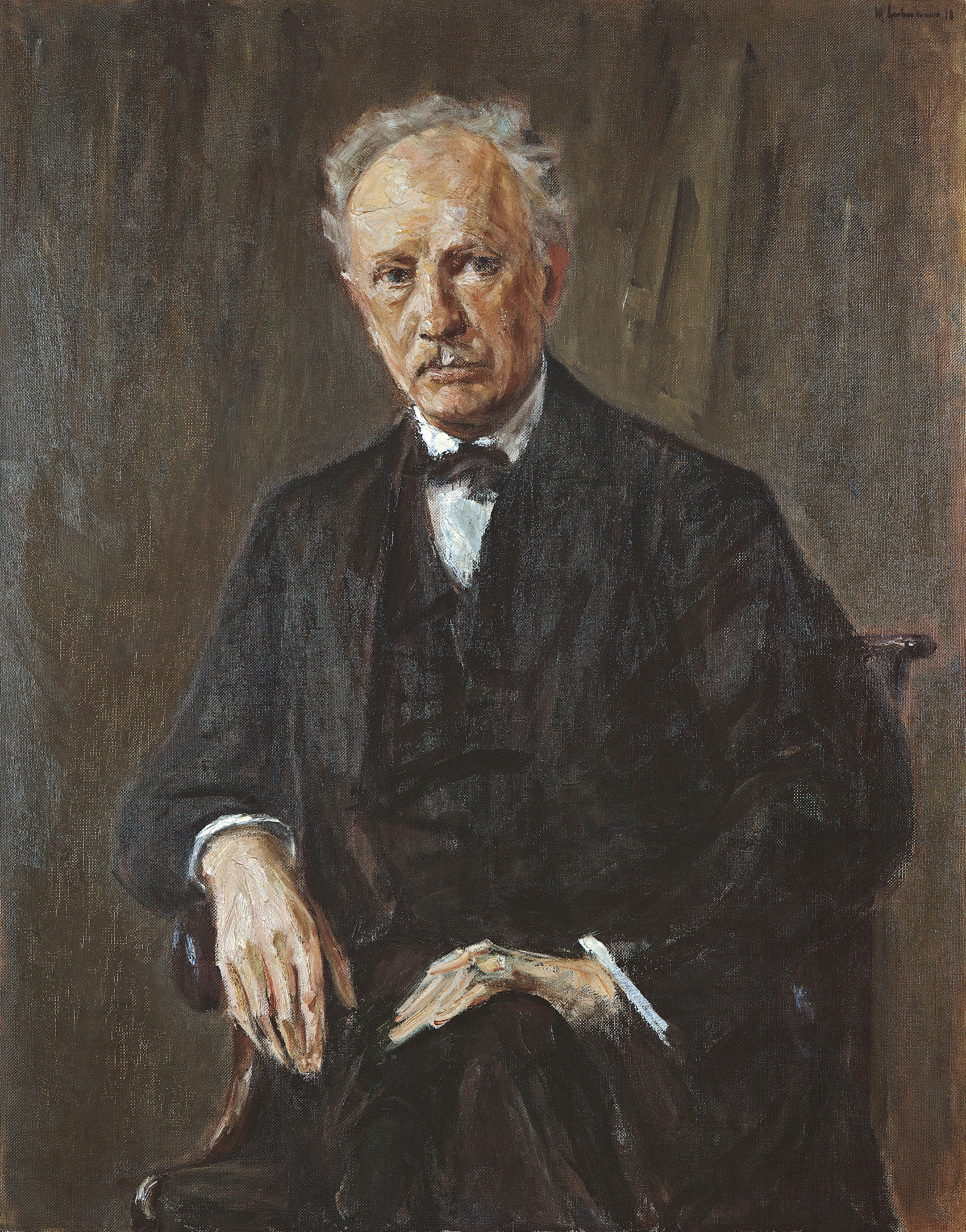
Richard Strauss

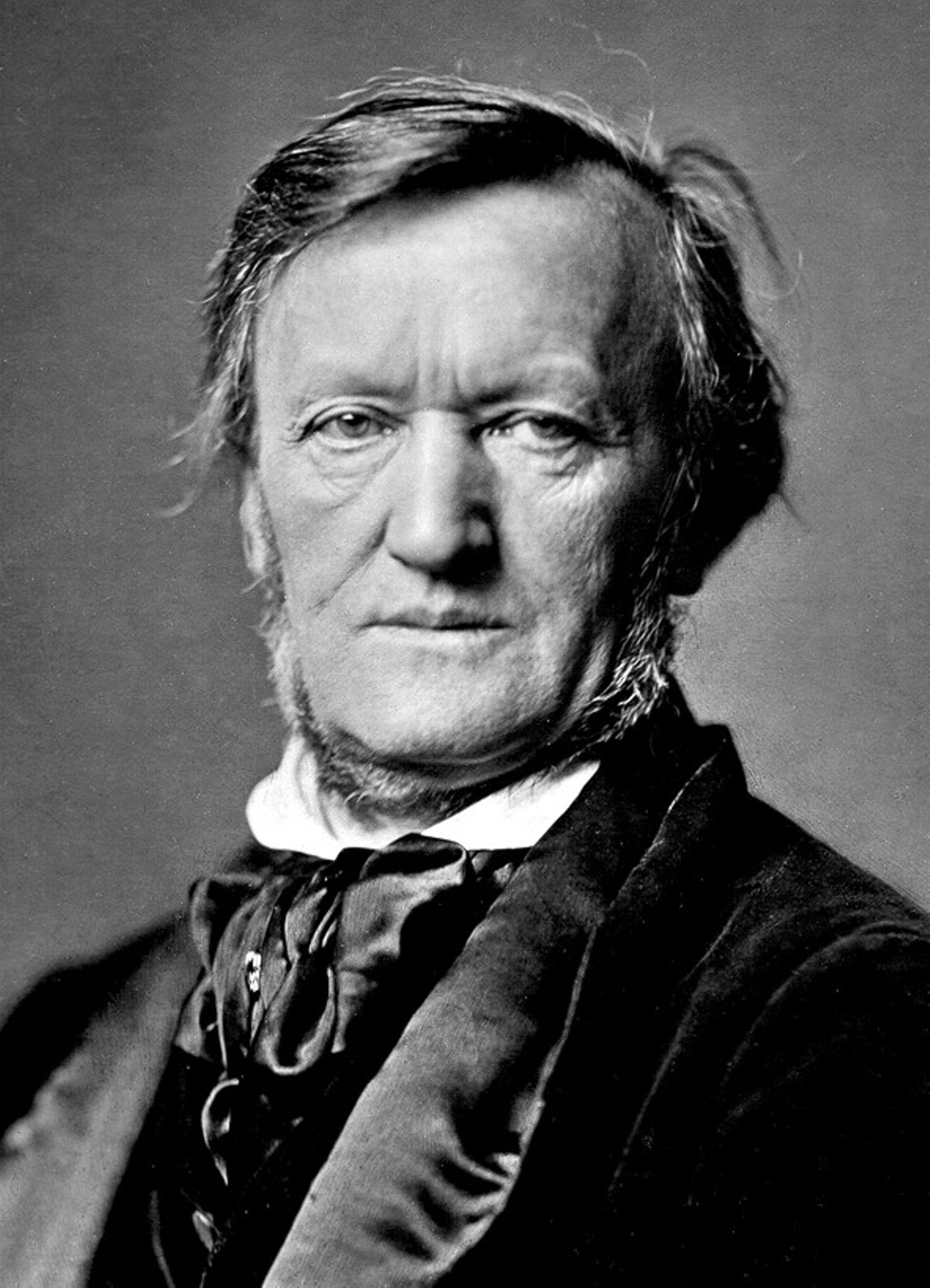
Wagner

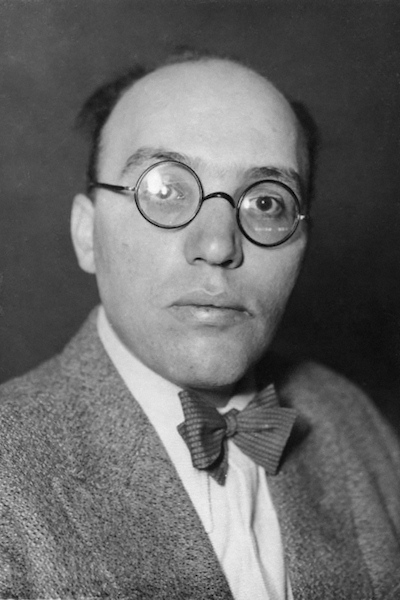
Weill

== A ==
- Ludwig Abeille (1761–1838)
- Carl Friedrich Abel (1723–1787)
- Clamor Heinrich Abel (1634–1696)
- Ludwig Abel (1835–1895)
- Otto Abel (1905–1977)
- Walter Abendroth (1896–1973)
- Franz Abt (1819–1885)
- Anton Cajetan Adlgasser (1729–1777)
- Theodor Ludwig Wiesengrund Adorno (1903–1969)
- Johan Agrell (1701–1765)
- Johann Friedrich Agricola (1720–1774)
- Martin Agricola (1486–1556)
- Carl Christian Agthe (1762–1797)
- Johann Georg Ahle (1651–1706)
- Johann Gottfried Arnold (1773–1806)
- Johann Rudolph Ahle (1625–1673)
- Joseph Ahrens (1904–1997)
- Sieglinde Ahrens (born 1936)
- Johann Caspar Aiblinger (1779–1867)
- Bartholomäus Aich (17th Century)
- Gregor Aichinger (1565–1628)
- Eugen d'Albert (1864–1932)
- Heinrich Albert (1604–1651)
- Giovanni Henrico Albicastro (c. 1660 – 1730), born Johann Heinrich von Weissenburg
- Christoph Albrecht (1930–2016)
- Leni Alexander (1924–2005)
- Johann Ernst Altenburg (1734–1801)
- Michael Altenburg (1584–1640)
- Johann Christoph Altnikol (1720–1759)
- Anna Amalia, Princess of Prussia (1723–1787)
- Johann André (1741–1799)
- Johann Anton André (1775–1842)
- Franz Joseph Antony 1790–1837
- Anna Amalia, Duchess of Brunswick-Wolfenbüttel (1739–1807)
- Amalie Auguste, Princess Amalie of Saxony (1794–1870)
- Johannes Aulen (late 15th century)

== B ==
- August Wilhelm Bach (1796–1869)
- Carl Philipp Emanuel Bach (1714–1788)
- Heinrich Bach (1615–1692)
- Johann(es) ("Hans") Bach III. (1604–1673)
- Johann Aegidius Bach I. (1645–1716)
- Johann Ambrosius Bach (1644–1695)
- Johann Bernhard Bach (1676–1749)
- Johann Bernhard Bach (the younger) (1700–1743)
- Johann Christian Bach (1735–1782)
- Johann Christoph Bach (the elder) (1645–1693)
- Johann Christoph Friedrich Bach (1732–1795)
- Johann Ernst Bach II (1722–1777)
- Johann Ludwig Bach (1677–1731)
- Johann Lorenz Bach (1695–1773)
- Johann Nikolaus Bach (1669–1753)
- Johann Sebastian Bach (1685–1750)
- Wilhelm Friedemann Bach (1710–1784)
- Wilhelm Friedrich Ernst Bach (1759–1845)
- Heinrich Backofen (1768–1830)
- Selmar Bagge (1823–1896)
- Blixa Bargeld (1959)
- Woldemar Bargiel (1828–1892)
- Ernst Gottlieb Baron (1696–1760)
- Friedrich Baumfelder (1836–1916)
- Jürg Baur (1918–2010)
- Waldemar von Baußnern (1866–1931)
- Franz Ignaz Beck (1734–1809)
- Hugo Becker (1863–1941)
- Ignaz von Beecke (1733–1803)
- Anton Beer-Walbrunn (1864–1929)
- Ludwig van Beethoven (1770–1827)
- Franz Behr (1837–1898)
- Franz Benda (1709–1786)
- Georg Anton Benda (1722–1795)
- Jean Berger (1909–2002)
- Wilhelm Berger (1861–1911)
- Christoph Bernhard (1628–1692)
- Friedrich Berr (1794–1838)
- Frank Michael Beyer (1928–2008)
- Johann Samuel Beyer (1669–1744)
- Günter Bialas (1907–1995)
- Franz Biebl (1906–2001)
- Michael von Biel (born 1937)
- Helmut Bieler (1940–2019)
- Benjamin Bilse (1816–1902)
- Boris Blacher (1903–1975)
- Oskar Gottlieb Blarr (born 1934)
- Leo Blech (1871–1958)
- Theodor Blumer (1881–1964)
- Martin Blumner (1827–1901)
- Erhard Bodenschatz (1576–1639)
- Georg Böhm (1661–1733)
- Siegfried Borris (1906–1987)
- Hans-Jürgen von Bose (born 1953)
- Thomas Böttger (born 1957)
- Johannes Brahms (1833–1897)
- Caspar Joseph Brambach (1833–1902)
- Theo Brandmüller (1948–2012)
- Nikolaus Brass (born 1949)
- Walter Braunfels (1882–1954)
- Reiner Bredemeyer (1929–1995)
- Wolfgang Carl Briegel (1626–1712)
- Max Bruch (1838–1920)
- Klaus Bruengel (born 1949)
- Nicolaus Bruhns (1665–1697)
- Karl Gottfried Brunotte (born 1958)
- Thomas Buchholz (born 1961)
- Philipp Friedrich Buchner (1614–1669)
- Fritz Büchtger (1903–1978)
- Hans von Bülow (1830–1894)
- August Bungert (1845–1915)
- Friedrich Burgmüller (1806–1874)
- Norbert Burgmüller (1810–1836)
- Adolf Busch (1891–1952)
- Max Butting (1888–1976)
- Johann Heinrich Buttstedt (1666–1727)
- Dietrich Buxtehude (1637–1707)

== C ==
- Sethus Calvisius (1556–1615)
- Christian Cannabich (1731–1798)
- August Conradi (1821–1873)
- Peter Cornelius (1824–1874)

== D ==
- Franz Danzi (1763–1826)
- Ferdinand David (1810–1871)
- Johann Nepomuk David (1895–1977)
- Constantin Christian Dedekind (1628–1715)
- Michael Denhoff (born 1955)
- Ratko Delorko (born 1959)
- Christoph Demantius (1567–1643)
- Paul Dessau (1894–1979)
- Felix Otto Dessoff (1835–1892)
- Albert Dietrich (1829–1908)
- Hugo Distler (1908–1942)
- Ramin Djawadi (born 1974)
- Johann Friedrich Doles (1715–1797)
- Heinrich Dorn (1804–1892)
- Justus Johann Friedrich Dotzauer (1783–1860)
- Felix Draeseke (1835–1913)
- Annette von Droste-Hülshoff (1797–1848)
- Philipp Dulichius (1562–1631)

== E ==
- Johann Georg Ebeling (1637–1676)
- Johann Ernst Eberlin (1702–1762)
- Traugott Maximilian Eberwein (1775–1831)
- Johannes Eccard (1553–1611)
- Moritz Eggert (born 1965)
- Werner Egk (1901–1983)
- Ernst Eichner (1740–1777), also known as Ernst Dietrich Adolph Eichner, Ernesto Eichner
- Hanns Eisler (1898–1962)
- Elisabeth Sophie of Mecklenburg (1613–1676)
- Philipp Heinrich Erlebach (1657–1714)
- Caspar Ett (1788–1847)

== F ==
- Hans Fährmann (1860–1940)
- Immanuel Faißt (1823–1894)
- Carl Friedrich Christian Fasch (1736–1800)
- Johann Friedrich Fasch (1688–1758)
- Reinhard Febel (born 1952)
- Alexander von Fielitz (1860–1930)
- Anton Fils (1733–1760)
- Gottfried Wilhelm Fink (1783–1846)
- Siegfried Fink (1928–2006)
- Anton Fischer (1778–1808)
- Johann Fischer (1646–1716)
- Johann Caspar Ferdinand Fischer (1556–1656)
- Johann Christian Fischer (1733–1800)
- Johann Karl Christian Fischer (1752–1807)
- Johann Friedrich Anton Fleischmann (1766–1798)
- Christian Flor (1629–1697)
- Friedrich von Flotow (1812–1883)
- Johann Nikolaus Forkel (1749–1818)
- Christoph Förster (1693–1745)
- Wolfgang Fortner (1907–1987)
- Eduard Franck (1817–1893)
- Johann Wolfgang Franck (1644 – c.1710)
- Melchior Franck (1580–1639)
- Richard Franck (1858–1938)
- Clemens von Franckenstein (1875–1942)
- Bernd Franke (born 1959)
- Robert Franz (1815–1892)
- Frederick II of Prussia (1712–1786)
- Carl Friedemann (1862–1952)
- Johannes Fritsch (1941–2010)
- Johann Jakob Froberger (1616–1667)
- Adam von Fulda (1445–1505)
- Wilhelm Furtwängler (1886–1954)

== G ==
- Florian Leopold Gassmann (1729–1774)
- Fritz Geißler (1921–1984)
- Harald Genzmer (1909–2007)
- Hans Gerle (c. 1498 – 1570)
- Friedrich Gernsheim (1839–1916)
- Ottmar Gerster (1897–1969)
- Franz Gleißner (1761–1818)
- Michael Gielen (1927–2019)
- Christoph Willibald Gluck (1714–1787)
- Hermann Goetz (1840–1876)
- Walter Wilhelm Goetze (1883–1961)
- Friedrich Goldmann (1941–2009)
- Berthold Goldschmidt (1903–1996)
- Gustav Graben-Hoffmann (1820–1900)
- Paul Graener (1872–1944)
- Christian Ernst Graf (1723–1804)
- Friedrich Hartmann Graf (1727–1795)
- Johann Graf (1684–1750)
- Carl Heinrich Graun (1704–1759)
- Kurt Graunke (1915–2005)
- Johann Gottlieb Graun (1703–1771)
- Christoph Graupner (1683–1760)
- Eduard Grell (1800–1886)
- Franz Grothe (1908–1982)
- Gallus Guggumos (c. 1590 – c. 1666)
- Gustav Gunsenheimer (1934–2026)
- Manfred Gurlitt (1890–1972)

== H ==
- Joseph Haas (1879–1960)
- Bernhard Joachim Hagen (1720–1787)
- Peter Michael Hamel (born 1947)
- Stefan Hakenberg (born 1960)
- Andreas Hakenberger (1574–1627)
- August Halm (1869–1929)
- Peter Michael Hamel (born 1947)
- George Frideric Handel (1685–1759)
- Heinz Friedrich Hartig (1907–1969)
- Karl Amadeus Hartmann (1905–1963)
- Ludwig Hartmann (1836–1910)
- Johann Adolph Hasse (1699–1783)
- Karl Hasse (1883–1960)
- Hans Leo Hassler (1546–1612)
- Jakob Hassler (1569–1622)
- Johann Wilhelm Häßler (1747–1822)
- Carl August Haupt (1810–1891)
- Moritz Hauptmann (1792–1868)
- Florian Havemann (born 1952)
- Joseph Haydn (1732–1809)
- Pantaleon Hebenstreit (1668–1750)
- Werner Heider (born 1930)
- Johann David Heinichen (1683–1729)
- Prince Heinrich XXIV Reuss of Köstritz (1855–1910)
- Hans Helfritz (1902–1995)
- Barbara Heller (born 1936)
- Sigmund Hemmel (c. 1520–1565)
- Fanny Hensel (1805–1847)
- Adolf von Henselt (1814–1889)
- Hans Werner Henze (1926–2012)
- Gerda Herrmann (1931–2021)
- Heinrich Freiherr von Herzogenberg (1843–1900)
- Hans-Joachim Hespos (1938–2022)
- Kurt Hessenberg (1908–1994)
- Moritz Heuzenroeder (1849–1897)
- Richard Bruno Heydrich (1865–1938)
- Werner Richard Heymann (1896–1961)
- Hildegard of Bingen (1098–1179)
- Wilhelm Hill (1838–1902)
- Ferdinand Hiller (1811–1885)
- Wilfried Hiller (born 1941)
- Paul Hindemith (1895–1963)
- Rudolf Hindemith (1900–1974)
- Stefan Hippe (born 1966)
- Karl Höller (1907–1987)
- York Höller (born 1944)
- E.T.A. Hoffmann (1776–1822)
- Melchior Hoffmann (c.1679/1685–1715)
- Franz Anton Hoffmeister (1754–1812)
- Heinrich Hofmann (1842–1902)
- Richard Hofmann (1844–1918)
- Franz von Holstein (1826–1878)
- Gottfried August Homilius (1714–1785)
- Nicolaus A. Huber (born 1939)
- Bertold Hummel (1925–2002)
- Franz Hummel (1939–2022)
- Johann Nepomuk Hummel (1778–1837)
- Engelbert Humperdinck (1854–1921)

== I ==
- Artur Immisch (1902–1949)

== J ==
- Georges Jacobi (1840–1906)
- Johann Christian Jacobi (1719–1784)
- Michael Jacobi (1618–1663)
- Salomon Jadassohn (1831–1902)
- Friedrich Wilhelm Jähns (1809–1888)
- Johann Gottlieb Janitsch (1708 – c.1763)
- Philipp Jarnach (1892–1982)
- Michael Jary (1906–1988)
- Johannes Jeep (c.1581/82–1644), also known as Johann Jepp
- Gustav Jenner (1865–1920)
- Adolf Jensen (1837–1879)
- Jens Joneleit (born 1968)
- Jens Josef (born 1967)
- Hugo Richard Jüngst (1853–1923)

== K ==
- Bert Kaempfert (1923–1980)
- Robert Kahn (1865–1951)
- Friedrich Kalkbrenner (1785–1849)
- Reinhard Keiser (1674–1739)
- Richard Rudolf Klein (1921–2011)
- Julius Klengel (1859–1933)
- Paul Klengel (1854–1935)
- Karl Klindworth (1830–1916)
- August Friedrich Martin Klughardt (1847–1902)
- Johann Wilhelm Cornelius von Königslöw (1745–1833)
- Joseph Martin Kraus (1756–1792)
- Johann Ludwig Krebs (1713–1780)
- Peter Anton Kreusser (1765–1831)

== L ==
- Helmut Lachenmann (born 1935)
- Josephine Lang (1815–1880)
- Alexander Ledkovsky (1944–2004)
- Friedrich Lindner (c. 1542–1597)
- Johann Carl Gottfried Löwe (1796–1869)
- Henning Lohner (born 1961)
- Carl Albert Löschhorn (1819–1905), also known as Loeschhorn
- Albert Lortzing (1801–1851)
- Vincent Lübeck (1654–1740)

== M ==
- Theo Mackeben (1897–1953)
- Claus-Steffen Mahnkopf (born 1962)
- Heinrich Marschner (1795–1861)
- Johann Mattheson (1681–1764)
- Emilie Mayer (1812–1883)
- Simon Mayr (1763–1845)
- Rupert Ignaz Mayr (1646–1712)
- Tilo Medek (1940–2006)
- Bernd Meinunger (1944–2025)
- Johann Nicolaus Mempel (1713–1747)
- Arnold Mendelssohn (1855–1933)
- Felix Mendelssohn (1809–1847)
- Gustav Merkel (1827–1885)
- Giacomo Meyerbeer (1791–1864)
- David Moritz Michael (1751–1827)
- Winfried Michel (born 1948)
- Wilhelm Middelschulte (1863–1943)
- Moritz Moszkowski (1854–1925)
- Leopold Mozart (1719–1787)
- Wolfgang Amadeus Mozart (1756–1791)
- Gerhard Müller-Hornbach (born 1951)
- Johann Gottfried Müthel (1728–1788)
- Johann Daniel Mylius (1583–1642)

== N ==
- Johann Friedrich Naue (1787–1858)
- Johann Gottlieb Naumann (1741–1801)
- Johann Nauwach (1595–1630)
- Hermann Necke (1850–1912)
- Christian Gottlob Neefe (1748–1798)
- Otto Neitzel (1852–1920)
- Sarah Nemtsov (born 1980)
- Wilhelm Neuland (1806–1889)
- Otto Nicolai (1810–1849)

== O ==
- Jacques Offenbach (1819–1880)
- Carl Orff (1895–1982)
- Caspar Othmayr (1515–1553)

== P ==
- Johann Pachelbel (1653–1706)
- Raimund Pechotsch (1864–1941)
- Johann Christoph Pepusch (1667–1752), also known as John Christopher Pepusch and Dr Pepusch
- Hans Pfitzner (1869–1949)
- Michael Praetorius (1571–1621)

== Q ==
- Johann Joachim Quantz (1697–1773)

== R ==
- Erika Radermacher (born 1936)
- Max Reger (1873–1916)
- Aribert Reimann (1936–2024)
- Carl Reinecke (1824–1910)
- Hermann Reutter (1900–1985)
- Ferdinand Tobias Richter (1651–1711)
- Anton Karl Richter (1690–1763)
- Rolf Riehm (1937–2026)
- Ferdinand Ries (1784–1838)
- Wolfgang Rihm (1952–2024)
- Johann Theodor Roemhildt (1684–1756)
- Eduard Rohde (1828–1883)
- Daniel Rosenfeld (born 1989)

== S ==
- Theodor von Schacht (1748–1823)
- Christoph Schaffrath (1709–1763)
- Samuel Scheidt (1587–1653)
- Martin Scherber (1907–1974)
- Philippine Schick (1893–1970)
- Louis Schlösser (1800–1886)
- Johann Jakob Schnell (1687–1754)
- Hans Michael Schletterer (1842–1893)
- Dieter Schnebel (1930–2018)
- Arnold Schoenberg (1874–1951)
- Johann Schop (1590–1667)
- Franz Schreker (1878–1934)
- Franz Schubert (1797–1828)
- Clara Schumann (1819–1896)
- Robert Schumann (1810–1856)
- Georg Caspar Schürmann (c. 1673–1751)
- Heinrich Schütz (1585–1672)
- Philipp Scharwenka (1847–1917)
- Fritz Seitz (1848–1918)
- Louis Spohr (1784–1859)
- Carl Stamitz (1746–1801)
- Lena Stein-Schneider (1874–1958)
- Karlheinz Stockhausen (1928–2007)
- Gottfried Heinrich Stölzel (1690–1749)
- Richard Strauss (1864–1949)

== T ==
- Georg Michael Telemann (1748–1831)
- Georg Philipp Telemann (1681–1767)
- Johann Theile (1646–1724)
- Friedrich Hieronymus Truhn (1811–1886)

== U ==
- Anton Urspruch (1850–1907)

== V ==
- Andreas Nicolaus Vetter (1666–1734)
- Johann Vierdanck (c. 1605–1646), also Virdanck, Vyrdanck, Feyertagk, Feyerdank, Fierdanck
- Johann Christoph Vogel (1756–1788), also Fogel
- Friedrich Robert Volkmann (1815–1883)
- Friedrich Voss (born 1930)

== W ==
- Max Wagenknecht (1857–1922)
- Ignatz Waghalter (1881–1949)
- Richard Wagner (1813–1883)
- Siegfried Wagner (1869–1930)
- Anton Wallerstein (1813–1892)
- Carl Maria von Weber (1786–1826)
- Kurt Weill (1900–1950)
- Hans Jürgen von der Wense (1894–1966)
- Fred Werner (1850–1920)
- Richard Wetz (1875–1935)
- Jörg Widmann (born 1973)
- Franz Wohlfahrt (1833–1884)
- Hanns Wolf (1894–1968)

== Z ==
- Friedrich Wilhelm Zachow (1663–1712), also Zachau
- Adolf Zander (1843–1914)
- Hans Zimmer (born 1957)
- Hermann Zilcher (1881–1948)
- Johann Rudolf Zumsteeg (1760–1802)

== See also ==
- Chronological list of German classical composers
- Lists of composers
- List of Germans
