= Friedrich Lindner =

Friedrich Lindner may refer to:

- Friedrich Lindner (composer) (c. 1542–1597), German composer, singer, music editor, copyist, and writer on music
- Friedrich Lindner (ornithologist) (1864–1922), German pastor and ornithologist
- Friedrich Ludwig Lindner (1772-1845), German writer, journalist and physician
