= Signale für die musikalische Welt =

German music magazine

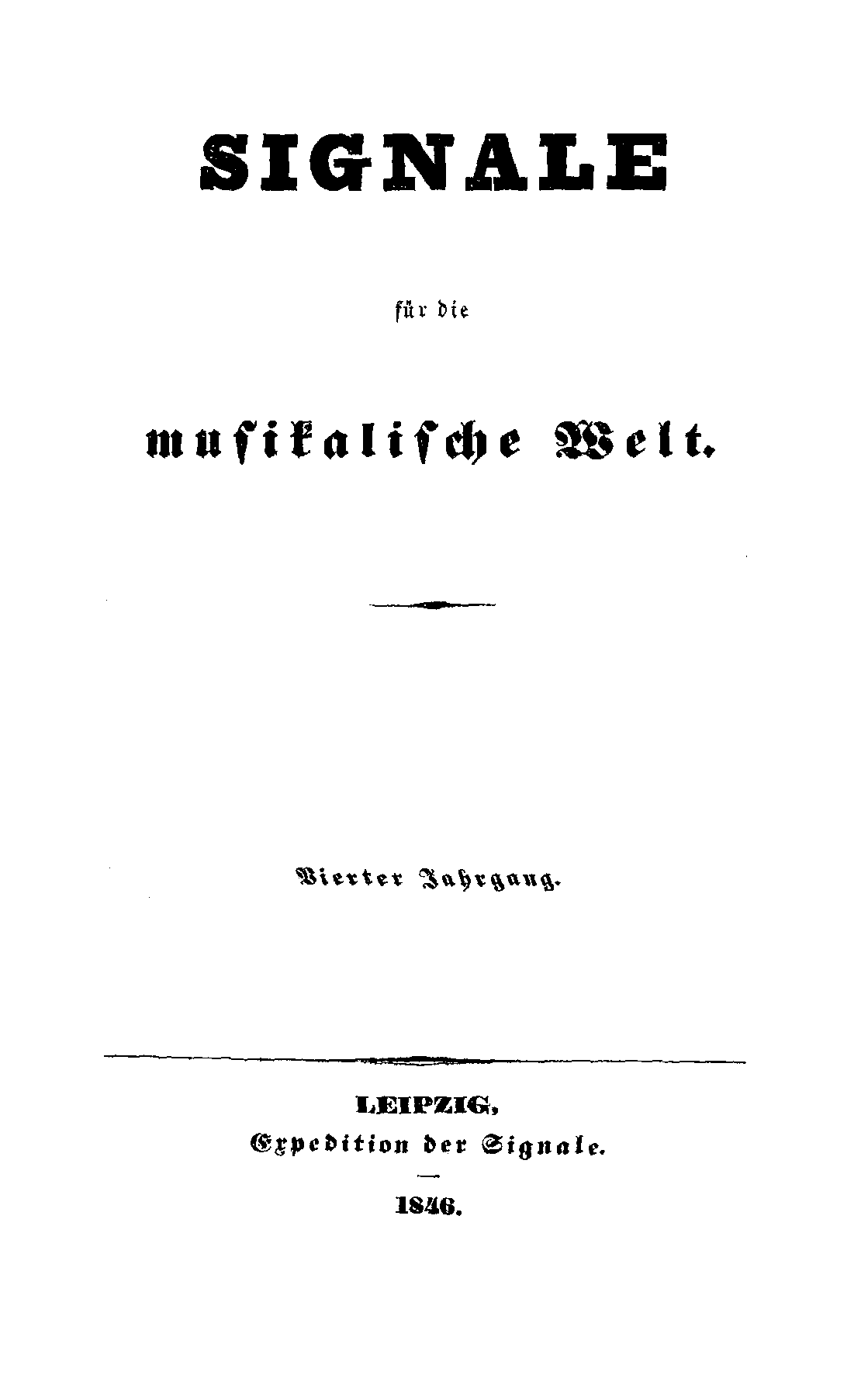
Title page, 1846

Signale für die musikalische Welt was a German music magazine established by Bartholf Senff in Leipzig in 1843 and ceasing publication in 1941. From 1907 (when the journal was sold to Simrock) to 1919, it was based in Berlin and Leipzig, and from 1920 to 1941 in Berlin. Its music critics included Louis Köhler (1844–86), Rudolf Schwarz (1887–97), Alfred Heuß (1902–05), and Ludwig Karpath.
