= Boris Ledkovsky =

Russian composer

Boris Mikhailovich Ledkovsky (Бори́с Миха́йлович Ледко́вский; 9 May 1894 in Agrafenovka, Don Host Oblast — 6 August 1975 in Freeport, New York) was a Russian-American composer of Church music and father of composer Alexander Ledkovsky.

== Life ==
Ledkovsky was born near Novocherkassk in 1894 to Protopriest Mikhail and Sophia Ledkovsky. He studied at the Theology School in Novocherkassk, in the Royal School in Rostov-on-Don and at the Moscow Conservatory with Alexander Kastalsky.

He directed at the St. Alexander Nevsky Cathedral in Sofia, Bulgaria; in Paris and in Berlin parishes and cathedrals. In 1937 Ledkovsky formed in Germany the all-male a cappella ensemble "Black Sea Cossacks Choir".

Ledkovsky married in 1943 to Marina V. Fasolt. With her, he fathered four children: Alexander (also a Church musician of note), Dimitri, Tatiana, and Michael. He emigrated with his family to the United States in 1951.

He was a prolific arranger and composer of Russian Orthodox Church music in the Moscow School style, relying heavily on traditional chant as well as austere harmonization forms.

From 1952 to 1975 he served as director of the Russian Orthodox Church Outside Russia (ROCOR) Synod Cathedral Choir of New York.

Boris Ledkovsky died of lung cancer on 6 August 1975, and was buried in Jordanville, New York at the Holy Trinity Monastery.
