= Friedrich Baumfelder =

German composer, conductor, and pianist

Friedrich August Wilhelm Baumfelder
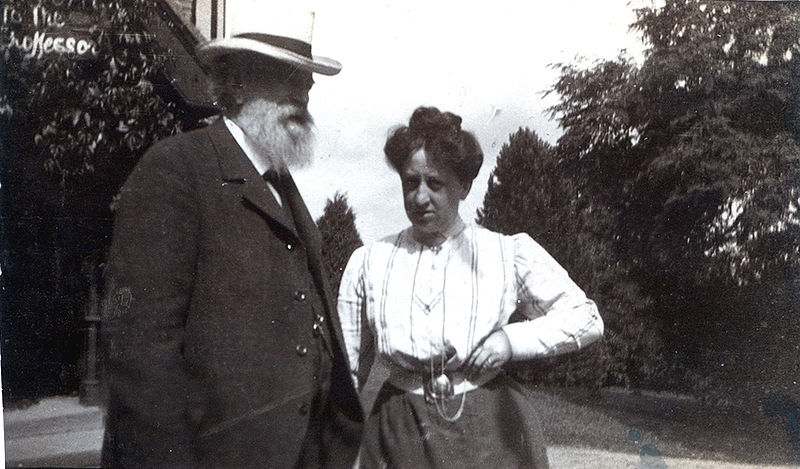
- Friedrich Baumfelder (left) with his wife Emma on a trip in England.
- Born: May 28, 1836; Dresden
- Died: September 8, 1916 (aged 80); Dresden
- Education: Leipzig Conservatory
- Occupations: Composer, conductor, and pianist
- Style: Romantic

Friedrich August Wilhelm Baumfelder (28 May 1836 – 8 September 1916 in Dresden) was a German composer of classical music, conductor, and pianist. He started in the Leipzig Conservatory, and went on to become a well-known composer of his time. His many works were mostly solo salon music, but also included symphonies, piano concertos, operas, and choral works. Though many publishers published his work, they have since fallen into obscurity.

== Life and Family ==
Friedrich Baumfelder was the third of seven children. His father was Carl Friedrich Gotthelf Baumfelder (1798–1865), a school reformer and pedagogue, and his mother was Friederike Ernestine (1806–1882).

At an early age, Baumfelder was admitted to the Leipzig Conservatory where he studied with Ignaz Moscheles and Moritz Hauptmann and later obtained a scholarship. His other teachers included Johann Schneider and Julius Otto. After leaving the Leipzig Conservatory, Baumfelder returned to Dresden where he worked as a cantor and music and piano teacher at the Dreikönigskirche. He taught Georg Schumann, who became one of his most successful students. In 1875, he became director of the Robert Schumann Singakademie, a post he held for several decades. Eventually, he became a successful and well known teacher and composer.

As Baumfelder gained recognition, he often went abroad to England, France, and later, the United States to perform. He and his wife Emma Baumfelder (née Skrimshire) had had five sons and two daughters: Henry (1864–1900), Fritz (1867–1888) (who composed as well), Florence (1869–1954), William (nickname Willie) (1870–1901), Gustav Baumfelder (1870–1931), Selma Marie Elisabeth (1871–1949), and Herbert Alfred Maria (1872–1946),

== Legacy ==
A tribute to Baumfelder was published on May 27, 1936, in the Dresdner Gazette, a day before the hundredth anniversary of his birth. It said:

It's been 100 years since Friedrich Baumfelder was born, on May 28th. In Dresden, many people will remember him as the old tall figure with the white, flowing hair under his hat...

It goes on to mention that Baumfelder had written several oratorios, and a setting of the 40th Psalm. These works have since been lost and possibly destroyed during World War II. The article also talks about how the Dresdner Liedertafel praised him, since he was under its leadership for two years:

The [Dresdner] Liedertafel biography of him [Friedrich Baumfelder] says that he was zealous and always prepared, and conducted with the most charming skills (...) A memorial for the former musical leader of the Dresden Liedertafel will be...at the Trinity Cemetery...

Baumfelder is still known in the United States, Germany, and in Great Britain today, but only for a few of his works, mentioned below.

== Musical works ==
Baumfelder composed more than 400 works, including symphonies, overtures, piano concerti, operas, choral works, and solo piano music. His Confidence, Op. 48, Rondo Mignon, Op. 49, Kinderscenen, Op. 270, and Rococo, Op. 367, were among his most popular works, and his Tirocinium musicae, Op. 300 was greatly demanded.

A great number of his works are lost, having been destroyed in World War II, and only a part of his oeuvre survives today.

His most known compositions today are the Peasant Dance from Op.208 and the Melody in F major, a simplified version of "Übung macht den Meister" (Practice Makes the Master), No. 3 from Album für Anfänger des Klavierspiels, Op.215. These pieces are played by students studying piano. More recordings of his works recently surfaced on CD by the Sächsische Posaunenmission, including his motet Praise the Lord.

== List of works with Opus numbers ==
This list of compositions by Friedrich August Wilhelm Baumfelder is categorized in the following way:

- Opus: The opus number of the work(s) (if any).
- Composition: The work title.
- Date: The date the work was published, performed, composed, or copyrighted; whichever was earliest.
- Key: The key of the work(s).
- Instrument(s): The instrument(s) or force(s) used to play this work.
- Notes: More information about the work(s).

The date shown is the earliest publication or copyrighted (if not date performed or composed) of the work that are known of. Any of these works could have been published or copyrighted at an earlier date.

Opus	Composition	Date	Key	Instrument	Notes
1	Four Canons	May 1855		Pianoforte	
2	Two Serenades	December 1856		Pianoforte	Dedicated to Dr. Krause in Dresden
3(a)	Zwei Lieder	1865?		Pianoforte and Tenor Voice	Words by Heinrich Heine. If the cover says "Fr. Baumfelder" this may be by Fritz, not Friedrich Baumfelder. First work definitely by "Fritz" is his opus 1 a few years after this, so time is more consistent.
3(a)/1	Lautes Geheimnis ("Die blauen Frühlingsaugen")	1865?		Pianoforte and Tenor Voice	Dubious? (See above)
3(a)/2	Verlorne Liebe ("Wir wuchsen in demselben Thal")	1865?		Pianoforte and Tenor Voice	Dubious? (See above)
3(b)	Chant du Berger	February 1856		Pianoforte	More likely to be by Friedrich Baumfelder given date of publication-Schissel
4	Une Fleur du Printemps	April 1856		Pianoforte	
5	Valse brilliante	November 1856		Pianoforte	
6	Lied f. Sopran aus: Die Pilgerfahrt der Rose (Denn a Röslein)	March 1857		Pianoforte and Soprano Voice	lost
7	Freundlich ermahnende Mutter	December 1857		Pianoforte	
8	Nocturne	January 1856		Pianoforte	
9	3 Fleurs. Morceaux Faciles	November 1865		Pianoforte	
9/1	Le Myosotis	November 1865		Pianoforte	
9/2	La Jacynthe	November 1865		Pianoforte	
9/3	La Rose des Alpes	November 1865		Pianoforte	
10	Sehnsucht nach der Heimath	February 1858		Pianoforte	
11	La Prière d'un Enfant	April 1856		Pianoforte	
11/1	Au Matin	April 1856		Pianoforte	
11/2	Au Soir	April 1856		Pianoforte	
12	Au Bord du Ruisseau, morceau characteristique	February 1858		Pianoforte	
13	Je pensais à toi. Pensée musicale	September to October 1857		Pianoforte	
14	Duftiges Veilehen. Klavierstück	December 1857		Pianoforte	
15	Polka brillante pour Piano	February 1858		Pianoforte	
16	Souvenir de Dresde. Mazurka	February 1858		Pianoforte	
17	Schillers Abendlied. Klavierstück	December 1857		Pianoforte	
18	Ma Prière pour toi. Nocturne	February 1858		Pianoforte	
19	Herzeleid. 4 characterische Tonstücke for Pianoforte	February 1858		Pianoforte	
20	Deux Caprices	June 1858		Pianoforte	
20/1	I.	June 1858		Pianoforte	Dedicated to Miss Emily Wangh his pupil. Published by Adolphe Brauer.
20/2	II.	June 1858		Pianoforte	
22	Agathe. Mazourka de Salon	February 1859		Pianoforte	
23	La Prière d'une Vierge	1859 July		Pianoforte	
24	Marche	1859 July		Pianoforte	
25	Dein Bild. Klavierstück	1859 February		Pianoforte	
26	2me Valse Brilliante	1859 November		Pianoforte	Dedicated to Miss Emily White.
27	Heimathsgruss. Klavierstück	1859 November		Pianoforte	
28	Ballade	1859 November		Pianoforte	
29	Gruss aus der Ferne	1860 July		Pianoforte	lost
30	Jugend-Album. 40 kleine Stücke am Pianoforte zu spielen	September to October 1860		Pianoforte	In 4 books
31	Jessie. Polonaise brillante pour Piano	1868		Pianoforte	lost
32	Der Frühling kommt! Klavierstück	May 1860		Pianoforte	lost
33	Süsser Traum. Klavierstück	1860 July		Pianoforte	lost
35	Romanze	November 1860		Pianoforte	lost
36	La Cascade	November 1890		Pianoforte	lost
38	Henriette-Polka	September to October 1858		Pianoforte	lost
39	Marcia Funebre	1860 August		Pianoforte	lost
40	Valse Styrienne, pour Piano	1861 January		Pianoforte	
41	Tyrolienne élégante, pour Piano	1861 January		Pianoforte	
42	Beim Schneiden. Melodie für Pianoforte	1861 January		Pianoforte	
43	Isabelle, polka élégante, pour Piano	1861 January		Pianoforte	
44	In stiller Nacht, Klavierstück.	1861 January		Pianoforte	
45	Galop brilliant, pour Piano	1861 January		Pianoforte	
46	Marie, polonaise brillante, pour Piano	1861 January		Pianoforte	
47	2me Ballade pour Piano	1861 January		Pianoforte	
48	Trost. Consolation	1865-66?		Pianoforte	Also known as Confidence, and Consolation. Andante de Concert
49	Rondo mignon pour Piano	February 1865	G major	Pianoforte	
50	Reisebilder. 5 leichte stücke	August 1861		Pianoforte	lost; Abschied von der Heimath; Wandermarsch; Im Elbthal; Auf dem See; Lustige Schweizer
51	Feuille d'Album	ca.1865		Pianoforte	lost
52	Pensée	ca.1865		Pianoforte	lost
53	2me Nocturne	November 1861	A♭ major	Pianoforte	
55	Clara Polka élégante pour Piano	1865		Pianoforte	
56	Stumme Liebe. 6 charakteristische Tonstücke	September to October 1860		Pianoforte	lost; made up of 6 pieces
60	Characteristic Sonata	Before April 1879, probably 1865-66		Pianoforte	lost; was perhaps one of the two sonatas performed at the Fünfundzwenzigjähriger jubilee?
61	Confidence. Chanson sans paroles pour Piano.	ca.1855 acc. to Dresden library		Pianoforte	Dresden library has at least some of this work, possibly all. Also, the National Library of Poland has this work, seemingly in full and available in a digitized form online.
63	Morceau héroique, pour Piano	March 1866		Pianoforte	
64	La Rêve, nocturne pour Piano	1865 February		Pianoforte	
65	Marche militaire pour piano	May 1863		Pianoforte	
66	Une Larme, nocturne pour Piano	October 1863		Pianoforte	
67	Transcription brillante sur l'air anglais: God bless the Prince of Wales pour Piano	July 1864		Pianoforte	lost; Transcription on the English air "God Bless the Prince of Wales"
68	Un Jour de Mai, morceau pour Piano	1866		Pianoforte	
69	Loin d'Elle, nocturne pour Piano	March 1863		Pianoforte	
70	Evelyn. Polka élégante	1864 February		Pianoforte	
71	Agnès, mélodie	1863 October		Pianoforte	
72	Croyez Moi! Mélodie	1865 April		Pianoforte	
73	La Fontaine, morceau characteristique pour pianoforte	1863 March		Pianoforte	
74	Le Cloches du Soir, nocturne pour piano	1863 March		Pianoforte	
75	Le Jour saint, 10 morceaux religieux	1863 September		Pianoforte	Work made up of 10 pieces
77	Chanson d'Amour	1863		Pianoforte	
79	Souvenir de Hertford. Polka élégante	1864 December		Pianoforte	lost
80	Berceuse pour le Piano	1863		Pianoforte	
81	Heiteres Bächlein. Klavierstück	1863 July		Pianoforte	
82	La Rose de Alpes	1864 December		Pianoforte	
83	Frohe Botschaft. Mazurka	1864 February		Pianoforte	
84	L'Espérance. Mélodie	1864 July		Pianoforte	lost
90	Étude mélodique	1863 September		Pianoforte	lost
91	10 Poesien in 2 books	1864 November		Pianoforte	lost; Was Grossmama erzhält; Scherzo; Militar-Marsch; Elegie; In heiterer Stunde; Finale; Gretchen am Spinnrade; Capriccio; Sage; Am Kamin
94	Valse-Impromptu pour Piano	1864 April		Pianoforte	
95	Transcriptions élégantes	1863		Pianoforte	Work made up of 5 pieces; Rataplan de l'Opera: La Forza Destino, de G. Verdi; Miscrere d'Opera: Il Trovatore, de G. Verdi; Choeur des soldats de l'Opera: Faust, de Gounod; Preghiera de l'Opera: Moïse, de Rossini; Air de Desdemona de l'Opera: Othello, de Rossini
97	La Forza de Destino, Opéra de G. Verdi. Fantasie élégante	1863 May		Pianoforte	lost; Fantasie on the opera La Forza de Destino by Giuseppe Verdi
98	Fantasie élégante sur l'Opera: Il Trovatore, de Verdi	1865 June		Pianoforte	Fantasie on the opera Il Trovatore by Giuseppe Verdi
100	10 Studien in 2 books	1863 September		Pianoforte	
101	Suite	1864 July		Pianoforte	Was perhaps one of the two suites performed at the Fünfundzwenzigjähriger jubilee?
101/1	Canonische Fantasie	1864 July		Pianoforte	
101/2	Präludium	1864 July		Pianoforte	
101/3	Adagio	1864 July		Pianoforte	
101/4	Menuett	1864 July		Pianoforte	
101/5	Scherzo	1864 July		Pianoforte	
101/6	Finale	1864 July		Pianoforte	
102	Norma del Bellini	1863 December		Pianoforte	lost; Fantasie on the opera Norma by Bellini
103	Faust de Goundod	April 1864		Pianoforte	lost; Fantasie on the opera Faust by Goundod
104	Les Huguenots, de Meyerbeer. Fantasie élégante pour Piano.	1870 August		Pianoforte	lost; Fantasy on "Les Huguenots" by Giacomo Meyerbeer
105	Brautlied	April 1865		Pianoforte	lost
106	Kurze Studien charakterisischen und mechanischen Inhalts zur Ausbildung des Vortrags u.d. Technik in 2 books	November 1865		Pianoforte	lost
107	La Traviata, de Verdi. Fantasie brilliante pour Piano.	1868		Pianoforte	lost; Fantasy on "La Traviata" by Giuseppe Verdi
111	Mädchen am Bache. Idylle	1865 March		Pianoforte	lost
112	Vöglein in den Zweigen	1865 May		Pianoforte	lost
113	La petite Coquette	1865 May		Pianoforte	lost
114	Im Mondenschein. Nachtgesang	1864		Pianoforte	
115	La Gazelle. Valse élégante	1864		Pianoforte	
116	Le Petit Tambour. Marche facile et brilliante	1864		Pianoforte	
117	Emmy. Mazurka für Pianoforte	1868		Pianoforte	lost
118	3ème Serenade	April 1866		Pianoforte	
119	Trinklied ohne Worte. Klavierstück.	1860s		Pianoforte	
120	Trio for Pianoforte, Violin, and Violincello	1864	D minor	Piano Trio	unpublished and lost; was performed at the Fünfundzwenzigjähriger jubilee
122	Transcription über das bel Lied von Martha von Löben Du hörst wie durch die Tannen	1865 September–October		Pianoforte	lost; transcription of the lied Du hörst wie durch die Tannen by Martha von Löben (dates unknown)
123	Rigoletto, de Verdi. Fantasie de Salon pour Piano.			Pianoforte	lost; Fantasy on "Rigoletto" by Giuseppe Verdi
124	Jägers Abendlied. Klavierstück.			Pianoforte	lost
125	Vögleins Erwachen. Klavierstück.			Pianoforte	lost
126	Lucia, de Donizetti. Fantasie de Salon pour Piano á 4 mains.	1870 August		Pianoforte or Pianoforte duet	lost; Fantasy on "Lucia di Lammermoor" by Gaetano Donizetti
130	Souvenir de Dresde, valse gracieuse pour Piano.	1866		Pianoforte	
131	Souvenir de Londres, mazurka élégante pour Piano.	1866		Pianoforte	
140	Wanderers Sehnsucht. Nachtgesang	1868		Pianoforte	lost
141	In der Ferne (La jeune Captive)	November 1865		Pianoforte	lost
142	Chanson des Pecheurs	1868		Pianoforte	lost
143	Valse-Étude	1868		Pianoforte	lost
144	Silberglöckchen. Mélodie	1868		Pianoforte	lost
146	La Prieré d'une Mére. Nocturne	1868		Pianoforte	arranged for orchestra and military band, versions published in 1885
147	Styrienne élégante pour piano	1866 November		Pianoforte	
148	Liebliches Sternlein. Tonstück	1866 November		Pianoforte	lost
149	Charlotte. Polka trembelante	1866 November		Pianoforte	lost
150	Neueste Schule der Gelänfigkeit. 10 etuden für mittlere Spieler. In 2 books	1868		Pianoforte	lost
151	Heimweh. Mélodie	1868		Pianoforte	lost
154(a)	3 petits Morceaux pour Piano	1866 November		Pianoforte	lost
154(a)/1	La Rosette blanche	1866 November		Pianoforte	lost
154(a)/2	Rondo facile	1866 November		Pianoforte	lost
154(a)/3	La Fille villageoise	1866 November		Pianoforte	lost
154(b)	Weisses Röschen. Elegie	1868		Pianoforte	lost. typo in Hofmeisters for opus 155 (or something else?)
156	Herzennwunsch Romanze	1868		Pianoforte	lost
157	5 Kinderstück	June 1866		Pianoforte	lost
159	Remembrance	1868	G major	Pianoforte	Also known as Erinnerung. Lied ohne Worte
160	Carneval de Venice. Morceau Brillante	1868		Pianoforte	lost
161	Bilder in Tönen. Sechs leichte Klavierstücke	1884		Pianoforte	partly lost; work made up of 6 pieces
161/1	Auf dem Wasser	1884		Pianoforte	lost
161/2	Totes Vöglein	1884		Pianoforte	lost
161/3	Die lustigen Tyroler	1884		Pianoforte	
161/4	Armer Bettler	1884		Pianoforte	lost
161/5		1884?		Pianoforte	lost
161/6	Betendes Kind	1884		Pianoforte	lost
162	Sous la Fenêtre. Sérénade	1868		Pianoforte	lost
163	Neue practische Pianoforteschule. New and practical Instruction Book for the Piano. Nouvelle méthode pour le Piano	1872 November		Pianoforte	Text in German, French, and English
164	Roméo et Julliete, de Gounod. Fantasie de Salon	1868		Pianoforte	lost; based on the opera Romeo et Juliette by Charles Gounod
165	Valse brillante de l`opéra "Romeo et Juliette" de Ch. Gounod	1867 November		Pianoforte	Based on the opera Romeo et Juliette by Charles Gounod
166	Le Désir. Romance	1867 November		Pianoforte	lost
167	Romance italienne	1868 May		Pianoforte	lost
168	Le petit Savoyard. Morceau caractér	1868 May		Pianoforte	lost
169	Vögleins Traum. Klavierstück	1868 May		Pianoforte	lost
170	Variationen über Original Thema	1883	A minor	Pianoforte	lost
171	Glöckchenspiel. Clavierstück	1883		Pianoforte	
172	Songe du Bonheur. Mélodie	1883		Pianoforte	lost
173	Les Hirondelles. Morceau brilliante	1883		Pianoforte	lost
174	Musikal. Bilderbuch. 3 melodien. Klavierstücke.	1850		Pianoforte	lost
174/1	Im Walde	1850		Pianoforte	lost
174/2	Am Feierabend	1850		Pianoforte	lost
174/3	Hirtenglöckchen	1850		Pianoforte	lost
175	Albumblätter: Drei Präludienartige Stücke für Piano	1850		Pianoforte	
176	Ruhe am Abend. Melodisches Klavierstück	1869 July		Pianoforte	lost
177	Goldfischchen. Charakterstück für Pianoforte	1869 July		Pianoforte	lost
178	Transcription für Pianoforte über: Ich Hab' im Traum geweinet von König	1869 August		Pianoforte	lost
179	Trost in Thränen. Melodischen Klavierstück	1870 June		Pianoforte	lost
180	Soldatengruss. Klavierstück	1870 June		Pianoforte	lost
181	Die Forelle. Charakterstück für Pianoforte	November 1869		Pianoforte	
182	Spielmannslied. Klavierstück	1869 November		Pianoforte	lost
183	Schneeglöckchen. Klavierstück	1870 May		Pianoforte	lost
184	Spinnerlied für Pianoforte	1869 November		Pianoforte	lost
185	Fluchtige Wellen. Melodischen Etude für Pianoforte	1870 April		Pianoforte	lost
186	Traum vom Liebchen. Charakteristisches Tonstück für Pianoforte	ca.1870		Pianoforte	lost
187	Nocturne napolitain pour Piano	1870 January		Pianoforte	lost
188	Traum vom Liebchen. Characteristisches Tonstück	published 1870 April Haslinger.		Pianoforte	HMB 1870 page 48. poss. lost.
189	Menuett	1870 June		Pianoforte	188, 189 published by Häslinger
191	Aschenbrödel. Polka-mazurka.	published 1870 April Hofmeister.		Pianoforte	HMB 1870 page 48. poss. lost.
192	Barcarole (no.1).	published 1870 April Hofmeister.		Pianoforte	HMB 1870 page 48. poss. lost?
193	Hirtengesang. Idylle.	November 1870, Häslinger		Pianoforte	HMB 1870 page 159.
194	Vergissmeinnicht. Romanze.	November 1870, Häslinger		Pianoforte	HMB 1870 page 159
194a	Herzenskönigin. Polka brilliante	April 1881		Pianoforte	lost
195	Tonblüthen - 12 Pieces	1871 December		Pianoforte	
195/1	„Sonst spielt’ ich mit Scepter“ after Lortzing	1871 December		Pianoforte	
195/2	Ständchen v. Schubert „Leise flehen“.	1871 December		Pianoforte	
195/3	Romanze aus Fra Diavolo „Seht ihr auf steilen Höh’n“.	1871 December		Pianoforte	
195/4	Thüringer Volkslied „Ach, wie ist’s möglich dann“.	1871 December		Pianoforte	
195/5	„Wenn du noch eine Mutter hast“ v. Neumann.	1871 December		Pianoforte	
195/6	„Ihres Auges himmlisch Strahlen“ aus d. Troubadour (Trovatore) v. Verdi.	1871 December		Pianoforte	
195/7	„O weine nicht“ v. Kücken.	1871 December		Pianoforte	
195/8	„Wie schön bist du“ v. Weidt.	1871 December		Pianoforte	
195/9	„Herzliebchen mein unter’m Rebendach“ v. Conradi.	1871 December		Pianoforte	
195/10	„Der Vogelfänger“ u. „In diesen heil’gen Hallen“ a. d. Zauberflöte v. Mozart. (Papageno.)	1871 December		Pianoforte	
195/11	„Einsam bin ich nicht alleine“ a. Preciosa v. Weber.	1871 December		Pianoforte	
195/12	„Ach so fromm“ von Martha v. Flotow.	1871 December		Pianoforte	
197	Gondellied	July 1871		Pianoforte	lost
199	Au coin du feu	July 1871		Pianoforte	lost
200	Drei Original Mazurken für Pianoforte	1871 September		Pianoforte	lost
200/1	Von Chopin	1871 September		Pianoforte	lost
200/2	Moscheles	1871 September		Pianoforte	lost
200/3	Rubinstein	1871 September		Pianoforte	lost
205	Moosröschen und Waldveilchen. 2 leichte u. melodische Klavierstücke.	1875 November		Pianoforte	No.1 also known as Rose sauvage.
206	Caprice hongroise	February 1872		Pianoforte	One copy @ ÖNB
207	Schlummerlied	1876 March–April	F major	Pianoforte	
208	Small Piano Pieces for the Young	1872?		Pianoforte	partly lost; Work made up of 12 pieces or more? For partial list see HMB 1871 page 215.
208/1	Moosröschen	July 1872		Pianoforte	lost
208/5	Peasant Dance (Bäuerlich Tanz)	1872?	G major	Pianoforte	
208/7	The First Violet	1872?	A major	Pianoforte	lost
209	Le Colibri. Chanson sans paroles.	1872 February		Pianoforte	
210	In der Ferne. Melodie.	1872 February		Pianoforte	
212	Valse Etude No.2	1872 October		Pianoforte	
213	Auprès du Berceau	1877 April		Pianoforte	
214	Alpenlieder	1876 March–April		Pianoforte	
215	Album für Anfänger des Klavierspiels.	1877 April		Pianoforte	description in HMB: 24 gefällige Tonstücke in stufenweiser Reihenfolge. in 3 volumes.
216	Humoristische Studien	1872 October		Pianoforte	
217	In froher Stunde. Sechs Characterstücke für Piano	1872		Pianoforte	No.1, a polonaise, is at National Library of Poland, Biblioteka Narodowa in a 1920s(?) reprint. Otherwise perhaps lost. Op.278 is actually the same work as Op.217 No.1, as confirmed from the digital scan of the copy at the National Library of Poland.
220	Knospen und Blüthen	1873 July		Pianoforte	
221	Abendständchen. Sérenade für das pianoforte	November 1872		Pianoforte	
223	Barcarole No.2	published 1874, C.F.W. Siegel		Pianoforte	source: HMB 1874 p. 139. poss.lost.
224	Alpenglöckchen, melody	1874 July, Siegel		Pianoforte	source: HMB 1874 p. 139. poss.lost.
225	Impromptu-Polka	1876 May	F major	Pianoforte	
226	Fröhliches Wandern	1872 April		Pianoforte	possibly lost but. May be an arrangement of a song of the same name (perhaps Schubert's?) conjecturally. Also published/received by HMB in 1875. Note: "Op. 226. Fröhliches Wandern. Hrsg. v. Franz Abt und Clemens Schultze." (hrsg. here means that the volume "Die Musikalische Welt, in which it appears, is curated by Abt & Schultze.) is @ ÖNB. so perhaps this is the work in question.
228	Getäuschtes Hoffen. Romanze.	1873 August		Pianoforte	according to HMB, appears in Die Musikalische Welt, in a copy @ ÖNB, as Op.226 does.
230		1874 February		Pianoforte	Poss. partially lost. This may be one piece, not a group of pieces. Listed in Hofmeister as "Rondo mignon (no.2)". (Question of interpretation until and unless work itself is found? However, since Op.49 is also a Rondo mignon, it seems that "no.2" most likely just means here "2nd Rondo mignon"...)
230/2	Rondo mignon (no.2?)	1874 February	F major	Pianoforte	Copy @ ÖNB. Dedicated to Marie Wunnerlich.
231	Zur Guitarre. Intermezzo für Pianoforte.	1874 February		Pianoforte	Dedicated to Gustav Fischer (according to ÖNB entry.)
232	Romance italienne	1875 December		Pianoforte	First appeared (if not earlier, and if not a transcription of a solo song) in Die musikalische welt v.3, 1/1874.
233	Babillard. Humoresque for Piano	1874 June		Pianoforte	
234	Le petit Soldat	1874 June		Pianoforte	
240	Accord-Etuden f. Pfte in stufenweiser Reihenfolge. (neue Ausgabe)	1879 May		Pianoforte	HMB 1876 page 313
241	22 Etüden für Pianoforte zur Erwerbung eines klaren runden Trillers (in three volumes)	1878 February		Pianoforte	Comprises three books; only the last two books survive. Dedicated to Salomon Jadassohn.
242	Abendmärchen. Sechs Characterstücke für Piano	1877 April		Pianoforte	
242/1	Abendmärchen. I	1877 April		Pianoforte	
242/2	Abendmärchen. II	1877 April		Pianoforte	
242/3	Abendmärchen. III	1877 April		Pianoforte	
242/4	Abendmärchen. IV	1877 April		Pianoforte	
242/5	Abendmärchen. V	1877 April		Pianoforte	
242/6	Abendmärchen. VI	1877 April		Pianoforte	
243	5 Präludien f. Pfte.	1877 October		Pianoforte	Schott, 1877. A♭ major, G major, F major, G major, A major according to HMB?
245	Waltzes	1877 November		Pianoforte 4-hands	in HMB
247	Wenn die Sonne scheidet.	1879 March		Pianoforte	1879 HMB p. 78
248	Am Brunnen. Charakterstück für Pfte.	1879 September		Pianoforte	
249	Neuer Frühling. Capriccio.	1878 April		Pianoforte	
250	Gesang aus dem Wasser. Klavierstück.	1881 September		Pianoforte	
252	Zwei Frühlings-Idylle für das Pianoforte	1882?		Pianoforte	
252/1	Im Blumengarten. Idylle.	1879 June		Pianoforte	
252/2	Minnelied. Idylle	1882 May		Pianoforte	
253	Valse de Concert	1878 August	E major	Pianoforte	HMB 1878, p. 231
255	Des Jägersmann	1878 August		Pianoforte, Tenor or Soprano	first line Was soll mir denu der Maientag
261	Mélodie russe	1879 March		Pianoforte	HMB 1879 page 72
262	Poème d'amour	1879 March		Pianoforte	HMB 1879 page 72
263	Styrienne pour piano	1873		Pianoforte	lost?
264	Le Chamois. Valse	1879 March		Pianoforte	HMB 1879 p. 72/@British Library
265	Le Chant des Sirènes	1879 March		Pianoforte	HMB 1879 p. 72
266	La Petite Gracieuse, morceau de salon pour Piano	1879 March		Pianoforte	HMB 1879 page 72.
268	10 Kinderlieder von Carl Gärtner: mit Begl. der Pianoforte (ohne Octavenspannungen)	1880 October		Voice, Pianoforte	HMB 1880 p. 307. Published by Bartholf Senff.
268/1	Vom Röslein	1880 October		Voice, Pianoforte	„Wisst ihr’s Kinder“
268/2	Die Violine	1880 October		Voice, Pianoforte	„Wer hat die Violin’ erdacht?“
268/3	„Du guter, alter lieber Herbst“	1880 October		Voice, Pianoforte	
268/4	Ein Engel	1880 October		Voice, Pianoforte	„Ich war so jung, so schwach und klein“
268/5	Wie es dem unfolgsamen Knaben erging	1880 October		Voice, Pianoforte	„Der Knabe lief in den Wald hinein“
268/6	Des Kindes Abendgebet	1880 October		Voice, Pianoforte	„Nun hat der Tag ein Ende“
268/7	Der Herbst mit dem grossen Kober	1880 October		Voice, Pianoforte	„Ist gekommen der Oktober“
268/8	Bächlein u. Knäblein	1880 October		Voice, Pianoforte	„Bächlein, wohin so munter?“
268/9	Das Kind u. die Blumen	1880 October		Voice, Pianoforte	„Nun schlaft, ihr lieben Blumen“
268/10	Des frommen Kindes Weihnachtssprüchlein	1880 October		Voice, Pianoforte	„Und ist das Stübchen noch so klein“
269	Frisches Grün	1880 April		Pianoforte?	
270	Kinderscenen für Pianoforte	1879 October		Pianoforte	
270/1	Sandman Knocks	1879		Pianoforte	
270/2	The Stork Has Come	1879		Pianoforte	
270/3	Old Ruin	1879		Pianoforte	
270/4	Vintage	1879		Pianoforte	
270/5	Young Officer	1879		Pianoforte	
270/6	The Music Box	1879		Pianoforte	
270/7	Setting Sun	1879		Pianoforte	
270/8	Grandma's Tale	1879		Pianoforte	
271	In den Augen liegt das Herz. Melodie.	October 1879		Pianoforte	HMB 1879, p. 302
273	Frühlingszeit von Reinhold Becker	1880 April		Pianoforte	Transcription of Frühlingszeit by Reihnold Becker (1842–1924)
274	Bon Humeur. Rondo	February 1880	C major	Pianoforte	
275	Serenade Espagnole	December 1879		Pianoforte	HMB 1879, p. 375
276	Blumenspende. Sechs leiche Charakterstücke.	1880 March		Pianoforte	HMB 1880, p. 85. not in Worldcat.
276/1	Maiblümchen	March 1880		Pianoforte	
276/2	Rose	March 1880		Pianoforte	
276/3	Nelke	March 1880		Pianoforte	
276/4	Gänseblümchen	March 1880		Pianoforte	
276/5	Veilchen	March 1880		Pianoforte	
276/6	Glockenblume	March 1880		Pianoforte	
277	Sous le Tilleul. Idylle.	1880 August		Pianoforte	
278	Coral Polonaise	1880 August	C major	Pianoforte	Also known as Chant Polonais. Op.278 is actually the same work as Op.217 No.1, as confirmed from the digital scan of the copy at the National Library of Poland.
279	Pensée d'Amour. Mélodie.	1880 August		Pianoforte	
280	Ma Patrie chérie. Mélodie.	1880 August		Pianoforte	
281	Scène militaire. Rondo brilliant et facile.	1880 August		Pianoforte	
282	Vineta. Romance for Piano.	1880 August		Pianoforte	
285	Miniatures. 4 Morceaux de Salon pour Piano	By 1887		Pianoforte	lost; Work made up of 4 pieces
285/1	Sous la fenêtre	1880 December		Pianoforte	lost
285/2	Ballade	1880 June	F minor	Pianoforte	lost
285/3	La premier Papillion	1887		Pianoforte	lost
285/4	Valse allemande	1880 November		Pianoforte	lost
288	Frühlings-Idylle	1880 December		Pianoforte	HMB 1880 p 368. At British Library
289	Bauernhochzeit	1880 December		Pianoforte	HMB 1880 p 368. At British Library
290	Waldbilder	1881 February		Pianoforte	HMB 1881 p. 27.
290/1	Waldvöglein			Pianoforte	
290/2	Ein Liebespärchen			Pianoforte	
290/3	Grasende Rehe			Pianoforte	
290/4	Fröhliche Jagd			Pianoforte	
290/5	Beim Erdbeerpflücken			Pianoforte	
290/6	Am Waldbach			Pianoforte	
292	Gavotte allemande	1881 January		Pianoforte	lost
295	La Réconciliation. Idylle	1881 June		Pianoforte?	
300	Tirocinium Musicae. Höher Klavierstudien	1881		Pianoforte	
301	Willst Du?	1881-82?		Pianoforte	lost
302	Trauer-Gesang	1882 September		Pianoforte	HMB 1882 page 271. (among piano works.) lost
303	Tyrolienne élégante	1881 October		Pianoforte	
304	Wiegenliedchen	1882 March		Pianoforte	HMB 1882 pp. 77. lost
305	Wenn Papa was hören will. Rondo	January 1882		Pianoforte?	lost
308	In der Mühle. Charakterstück	December 1881		Pianoforte	
309	Abandonné. (Verlassen.) Mélodie pour Piano	1882		Pianoforte	
310	Tongemälde. Sechs leichte u. brillante Klavierstücke ohne Oktavenspannungen.	1882		Pianoforte	HMB 1882 page 263.
310/1	Die Post kommt	1882		Pianoforte	
310/2	Heimweh	1882		Pianoforte	
310/3	Der Spielmann	1880		Pianoforte	
310/4	Schmeichelkätzchen	1880		Pianoforte	
310/5	Sonntagsruhe	1880		Pianoforte	
310/6	Prinz Carneval	1880		Pianoforte	
313	Marche bohémienne pour Piano	1882		Pianoforte	
314	Mädchenlieder	1882		With voice?	lost; Since Op.314 No.1 is titled "Mädchenlieder. I," this work probably had more pieces part of it.
314/1	Mädchenlieder. I	July 1882		With voice?	lost
315	Am Feierabend. Charakterstück	1882		Pianoforte	
316	Chanson d'Autorefois pour Piano	1882		Pianoforte	
317	Premier Boléro pour piano	1883	D major	Pianoforte	
319	Carmen. Valse de concert	1883		Pianoforte	HMB 1883 page 188
323	Nocturne espagnole	1884 January		Pianoforte	lost
324	Frische Knospen. Sechs Leichte n. gefällige Tonstücke für Pianoforte zu 4 Händen	1884 April		Pianoforte four-hands	
324/1	Süsser Traum	1884 April		Pianoforte four-hands	
324/2	Zu Papas Geburtstag. Marsch	1884 April		Pianoforte four-hands	
324/3	Armer Savoyard	1884 April		Pianoforte four-hands	
324/4	Unter der Linde. Polka	1884 April		Pianoforte four-hands	
324/5	Beim Abendläuten	1884 April		Pianoforte four-hands	
324/6	Unterm Weihnachtsbaum. Walzer	1884 April		Pianoforte four-hands	
325	Romance Espagnole pour piano	1884 August		Pianoforte	Sounds like it may be related to Op.323?
326	Doux Souvenir pour piano	1884		Pianoforte	
327	Frisches Grün	1886 May		Pianoforte	
329	Petite Valse	1884	E♭ major	Pianoforte	lost
330	Liebesliedchen	1884		Pianoforte	
332	Tarantelle	1885 September	G major	Pianoforte	lost
333	Hans und Grete. 2 Leichte Rondos	1887		Pianoforte	lost; work made up of two pieces
334	Nachtigallsingt. Charakterstück	1887		Pianoforte	lost
335	l’Amitié. Romance.	1886 June		Pianoforte	In the magazine Die Musikalische Welt. Monatshefte ausgewählter Compositionen unserer Zeit. edited by Schulze etc., 1886. (several Baumfelder works not otherwise available appeared in issues of this magazine.)
336	Les Sylphides. Caprice pour piano.	1886 June		Pianoforte	
349	Zwei Klavierstücke	1889 January by Näumann of Dresden		Pianoforte	
349/1	Madrigal	1889 January		Pianoforte	
349/2	Traumbild	1889 January		Pianoforte	
354	Petite valse pour piano	1891 by C.F. Kahnt	G major	Pianoforte	HMB 1891 page 82
355	Immergrün. Charakterstück f. Pfte	1890 November by C.F. Kahnt		Pianoforte	HMB 1890 page 480
363	Pastorale	1892 March by Näumann of Dresden		Pianoforte	
367	Rococo			Pianoforte	
372	Rondino Facile	1899 May	G major	Pianoforte	op.372, 373 - published at the time by Schott in Mainz. Copy of op.372 at L. Coburg.
373	Petite Berceuse	1899 May		Pianoforte	lost
374	Frühling und Winter.			Pianoforte and Choir	lost; Unknown Choir arrangement. Perhaps SATB?
375	Maiglöcken läutet	1901 August		Pianoforte	
377	Lustige Fanfaren, Marsch	1901 August		Pianoforte	
384	Jolly Story for pianoforte	1905		Pianoforte	
386	Bagatelle pour piano	1905		Pianoforte	
391		1913		Pianoforte duet	Work made up of 2 pieces
391/1	Plauderei	September 29, 1913		Pianoforte duet	
391/2	In der herberge	September 18, 1913		Pianoforte duet	
393	Sehesucht	1910		Pianoforte	
394	Polka Mignon	1914		Pianoforte	
395	Im der Garten. Serenade für Pianoforte	October 29, 1913		Pianoforte	
398	Petit Valse	1910		Pianoforte	
399	The Spinning Girl	1913		Pianoforte	
400	Immortelle	1910	C major	Pianoforte	
403	Idyl	1910	G major	Pianoforte	
404	Meditation. Nocturne	1913		Pianoforte	
405	Chant du berger	1911	G major	Pianoforte	
408	Lorelei	1914		Pianoforte	Based on the poem "Die Lorelie" by Heinrich Heine. Published in a collection by Hinds, Noble & Eldredge.

== List of works without Opus number ==
Even though these works are thought to be without opus number, a lot of the works below may have originally been assigned to an opus number.

Composition	Date	Key	Instrument(s)	Notes
Der liebesring. Opera	January 26, 1861			lost; First performed in Dresden. Libretto written by Hermann Schmid
Symphony			Orchestra	lost?
Symphony in German Style	1850		Orchestra	
Symphony	May 1, 18xx [1849?]	C minor	Orchestra	survives in manuscript in a library in Dresden
Symphony	1873	G minor	Orchestra	lost; last known performance on February 27, 1874
Symphony	1854	E minor	Orchestra	lost; last known performance on November 22, 1854
2 Sonatas for Piano and Violin	Before April 1879		Piano and Violin	lost; was performed at the Fünfundzwenzigjähriger jubilee
Der Geiger zu Gmünd			Choir and Orchestra	lost
Troise	1866			
Praise the Lord	September 1887		Mixed Chorus	A motet
Barmherzig und gnädig ist der Herr	September 1887		Mixed Chorus	A motet
Gesangstück	Before April 1879		Pianoforte and Voice?	lost; was performed at the Fünfundzwenzigjähriger jubilee
Dance on the green. Tänzchen im grilnen.	June 8, 1899		Pianoforte	lost
Tyrolienne (Ländler)	1910	B♭ major	Pianoforte	
Melody (Lullaby)		F major	Pianoforte	Maybe from Op.40 or Op.268?
Poe	1879			
Hungarian Intermezzo (Flying Leaves)	January 25, 1911		Pianoforte	
Edelweiss. Pure as Snow. Cansonette.	1903		Pianoforte	
5 Praeludien für das Pianoforte	1877		Pianoforte	
La Petite Gracieuse, morceau de salon pour Piano	1879		Pianoforte	
Calla Waltz pour Piano	ca. 1879		Pianoforte	
Motette. Warum betrbst du dich, mein Herz. Für gemischten Chor.	1886		Mixed Choir?	
Deuxie	1862			
Suite	Before April 1879		Pianoforte	lost; was performed at the Fünfundzwenzigjähriger jubilee
Sonata	Before April 1879		Pianoforte	lost; was performed at the Fünfundzwenzigjähriger jubilee
15 Etuden zur Ausbildung des Geschmacks für Piano	1880		Pianoforte	
Im Wald, im Wald ist's frisch und grün. Lied von L. Hartmann, als Transcription für Klavier bertragen	1880		Pianoforte	Transcription on the lied "Im Wald, im Wald, ist's frisch und grün" by L. Hartmann
Sce	1880			
Rose sauvage	1873		Pianoforte	Possibly Op.205 No.1 and republished without opus number.

== Sources ==
Only a list of sources was given for some of the biographical information given to create this article. The information came from the article at German Wikipedia.

- Paul - Hand Dictionary of Music, Leipzig, 1870
- Musicians Encyclopedia, Frank Altmann, 1936
- Dresden Gazette dated May 27, 1936
- Research by Freital Claus Scharschuch, on Friedrich Baumfelder's family history
- Pazdirek - Universal Manual of Music Literature
