= Louis Köhler =

German composer, conductor and piano teacher (1820–1886)

Christian Louis Heinrich Köhler
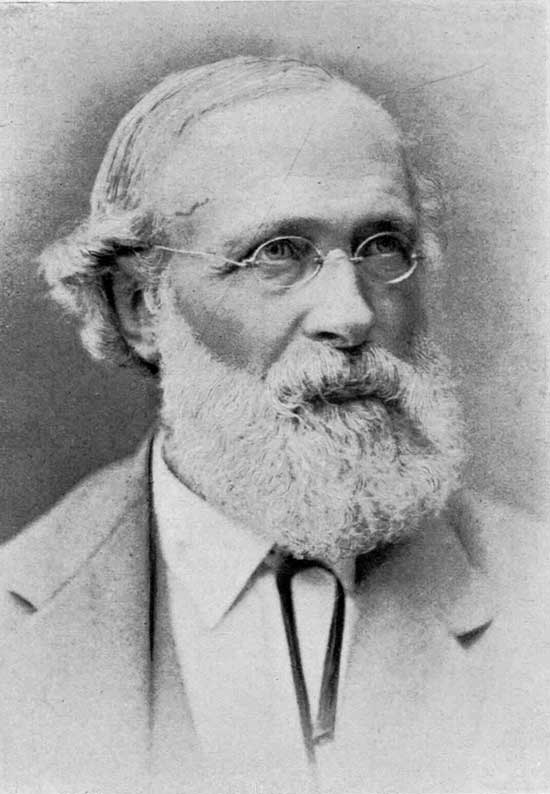
- Undated photograph
- Born: 5 September 1820; Braunschweig
- Died: 16 February 1886 (aged 65); Königsberg

Christian Louis Heinrich Köhler (5 September 1820 – 16 February 1886) was a German composer, conductor and piano teacher.

== Biography ==
Köhler was born in Braunschweig. He studied piano in Vienna under Carl Maria von Bocklet, Simon Sechter and Ignaz von Seyfried. As a conductor, he worked in Marienburg and Elbing. After that he settled in Königsberg in 1847, after which time he concentrated on piano teaching and writings on music. Among his pupils were Adolf Jensen and Hermann Goetz.

He was a critic for the Hartungsche Zeitung from 1849 to 1886, and was a contributor to Signale für die musikalische Welt from 1844 until 1886. His writings were well known to Liszt and Wagner; he also proposed the formation of the Allgemeiner Deutscher Musikverein, with which Liszt was involved.

Köhler composed three operas and a ballet, and wrote books on musical theory. He also wrote educational works for piano.

He died in Königsberg on 16 February 1886. He was 65 years old.

== Selected writings ==
- Die Melodie der Sprache (Leipzig, 1853)
- Systematische Lehrmethode für Klavierspiel und Musik (Leipzig, 1857–8, 3/1888)
- Die Gebrüder Müller und das Streichquartett (Leipzig, 1858)
- Führer durch den Clavierunterricht (Leipzig, 1859, 9/1894)
- Der Clavierunterricht: Studien, Erfahrungen und Ratschläge (Leipzig, 1860, 6/1905)
- Leicht fassliche Harmonie- und Generalbass-Lehre (Königsberg, 1861, 3/1880)
- Gesangs-Führer (Leipzig, 1863)
- Die neue Richtung in der Musik (Leipzig, 1864)
- Einige Betrachtungen über Sonst und Jetzt (Leipzig, 1867)
- Johannes Brahms und seine Stellung in der neueren Musikgeschichte (Hanover, 1880)
- Allgemeine Musiklehre (Leipzig, 1883)
- Katechismus der Harmonielehre (Stuttgart, 1888, 2/1892)
- Allegro Moderato (1880)
