= Alexander Ledkovsky =

German-American composer

Alexander Borisovich Ledkovsky (June 3, 1944 – December 24, 2004) was an American conductor, composer, and music editor of Russian descent.

== Life ==
Alexander Ledkovsky was born in Teupitz, Germany during war-time to parents Marina Viktorovna Ledkovsky (née Fasolt) and Boris Mikhailovich Ledkovsky, a prominent choral director and composer/arranger of Russian Orthodox Church music.

Having emigrated to the United States in 1951, Alexander was educated at Trinity School and Columbia University, where he earned a B.A. in Music. Although he developed a successful career as a computer expert and software developer, his life's love was his work as a musician of the Russian Orthodox Church.

Having studied choir direction both at university and under his father's tutelage, he took on responsibilities as assistant choirmaster at the Russian Orthodox Synod Cathedral "Our Lady of the Sign" located on Park Avenue at 93rd Street in New York. He also ran a secondary choir for the cathedral's English-speaking parish in the late 1960s.

When his father's health declined, Alexander assumed full responsibility for the Russian Orthodox Church Outside Russia (ROCOR)'s flagship choir, on Forgiveness Sunday in 1975. He held this post until his own declining health forced him to relegate responsibilities to assistants in 2002.

== Musical work ==
During his tenure, which lasted more than a quarter-century, Alexander Ledkovsky led a number of unique projects, including concerts at Lincoln Center, performances at Carnegie Hall (in cooperation with the Russian Choral Society and the Opera Orchestra of NY), and a number of grand occasions at the cathedral, such as the canonization of the New Martyrs of Russia in 1981, the funeral of Metropolitan Philaret and the memorial services and funerals of many renowned members of the Russian emigrate community, such as choreographer George Balanchine.

Under Alexander Ledkovsky's direction, the choir produced two compact disc recordings in 1994: "All-Night Vigil for 700 Years of the Our Lady of Kursk Icon" and "Celebrating the Composer's Centennial: Divine Liturgy of Boris M. Ledkovsky"

In 1999, Ledkovsky launched one of the first websites devoted to online publication of music scores of Russian Orthodox Church Music, www.rocm.org. Although he fell ill with cancer that same year, and succumbed to the disease within five years, Ledkovsky was astonishingly productive in his work to create and publish numerous liturgical scores, including music for the full services of each of the services of the complete cycle of Orthodox Feasts.

After a struggle with head and neck cancer, Ledkovsky died in his home on Christmas Eve, 2004. His funeral was served by three bishops (ROCOR Metropolitan Laurus, Bishop Gabriel of Manhattan and Bishop Peter of Cleveland) more than a dozen priests, several deacons, and a chorus of more than 100 singers, some of them travelling far distances to pay him homage.
