= Johannes Aulen =

German composer

Johannes Aulen (fl. late 15th century) was a German composer. Nothing is known about his biography.

A 3-voice Mass is present in several sources. Another composition, the 4-voice motet Salve virgo virginum attributed to him seems to be of a later composer of Josquin's generation.
