= August Halm =

German music theorist, educationist and composer (1869–1929)

- Born: August Otto Halm; 26 October 1869; Gaildorf, Germany
- Died: 1 February 1929 (aged 59); Saalfeld, Germany
- Occupations: Music theorist, composer

August Otto Halm (26 October 1869 – 1 February 1929) was a German music theorist, music educationist and composer.
