= Klaus Bruengel =

German Composer and bass player

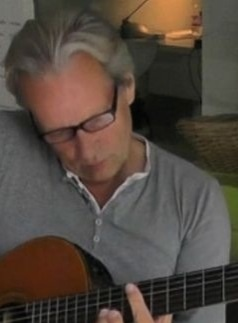
Klaus Brüngel (2013)

Klaus Bruengel (born in October 1949 in Holzwickede) is a German Composer and bass player. Noteworthy are his 46 musical representations of the characters and places in Homer's epic Odyssey, summarized in the Odyssey Suite. In 2014, he composed the ballet suite In Monets Garden.

== Life ==
Bruengel studied music at the Hochschule für Musik Detmold and educational science at the University of Münster. He made a name for himself as composer, bassist and music-arranger with the "Kurt Weil Orchestra" in Sweden and Switzerland, and also as a member of the jazz rock band Time in Space. There followed a number of years as session musician and musical arranger at the WDR (German radio/TV station).

He collaborated with Schauspielhaus Bochum, there he played in Saint Joan of the Stockyards by Bertolt Brecht, The Cherry Orchard by Anton Pavlovich Chekhov, The Bat by Johann Strauss II, Bruengel also worked as a bassist with artists like Markus Stockhausen, Herbert Grönemeyer, Jon Eardley and Jimmy Smith. He composed the Musical "Meeresleuchten". His Pseudonym is Nicola de Brun. In 2002, he had his own Orchestra and played for the Unicef with Kevin Tarte and Afsaneh Sadeghi.

== Publications ==
=== Discography ===
- Piano sounds of harmony, Verlag Fröndenberg, 1994
- Ballet Music for Exercises Album 1–5, Edition Scores&Parts, Dortmund, 2013
- Preludes for Piano and Small Orchestra, Edition Scores&Parts, Dortmund, 2013
- Nocturnes for Piano, Edition Scores&Parts, Dortmund, 2013
- Four Tangos, Edition Scores&Parts, Dortmund, 2013
- Four Seasons, Edition Scores&Parts, Dortmund, 2013
- Homer's Epic Odyssey Album 1–2, Edition Scores&Parts, 2013
- Homer's Epic Odyssey Album 3, EAN 4250782288646, Edition Scores&Parts, 2014
- Kammermusikalische Phantasien, EAN 4250782317865, 2014
- Impressions Album 1–18, EAN 4250782288639, 2014
- Impressions Album 19–36, EAN 4250782290267, 2014
- Music Kaleidoscope, EAN 4250782288622, 2014
- In Monets Garten (Ballett Suite), EAN 4250782287168, 2014
- Ballet Music for Piano Album 1-30, EAN 4250782286314, 2014
- Ballet Music for Piano Album 31–60, EAN 4250782286345, 2014
- Ballet Music for the Professional Dancer, EAN 4250782352439, 2014
- Ballet Music for Dancers, EAN 4250782382931, 2014
- Music for Piano, Harp, Cor Anglais and Oboe D'Amore, EAN 4250782404015, 2015
- Pavane for Harp and Cor Anglais, EAN 4250782406149, 2015
- Scherzino for Oboe and Harp, EAN 4250782411167, 2015
- Piano Music for Ballet (Exercises), EAN 4250928372239, 2016
- Piano Music for Ballet 31–60 (Vol. 2), EAN 4250928388919, 2016
- Woodwinds Nocturne (Woodwinds, Piano and Harp), EAN 4250928391872, 2016
- Nocturne for String Quartet, EAN 4250928393579, 2016
- Kammermusikalische Phantasien 6–10, EAN 4250532598278, 2016
- Impromptu No. 2 (Music for Flute, Oboe, Strings and Piano), EAN 4250887849896, 2016
- Moonlight Dreams Ballet (14 Piano Pieces), EAN 4250887853497, 2017
- Ballet Suite No. 2, EAN 4251177538155, 2017
- Ballet Piano (31–60), EAN 4251177545276, 2017
- Côte d' Azur Suite, EAN 4061707001109, 2018
- Poetry for Cor anglais and Piano, EAN 4061707034930, 2018
- Vier Jahreszeiten (Musik für Englischhorn und Klavier), EAN 4061707378539, 2020
- Impromptu 3, EAN 4061707451539, 2020
- Tuesdays Nocturne, EAN 4061707453281, 2020

=== Notebooks ===
- Ballet Music For Exercises 1–5, Edition Scores&Parts, Dortmund, 2013, ISBN 9783955771027
- Preludes for Piano and Small Orchestra, Edition Scores&Parts, Dortmund, 2013, ISBN 9783955772253
- Nocturnes for Piano, Edition Scores&Parts, Dortmund, 2013, ISBN 9783955771591
- Four Tangos, Edition Scores&Parts, Dortmund, 2013, ISBN 9783955771614
- Four Seasons, Edition Scores&Parts, Dortmund, 2013, ISBN 9783955771898
- Homer's Epic Odyssey 1–2, Edition Scores&Parts, Dortmund, 2013, ISBN 9783955771911
- Jazz Rhythm Changes One, Edition Scores&Parts, Dortmund, 2013, ISBN 9783955772062
- Ballet Music for Piano Album 1-30, ISMN 9790502433055, 2014
- Ballet Music for Piano Album 31–60, ISMN 9790502433062, 2014
- Impressions Album 1–18, ISMN 9790502433079, 2014
- Impressions Album 19–36, ISMN 9790502433086, 2014
- Phantasies, ISMN 9790502433024, 2014
- Music Kaleidoscope, ISMN 9790502433031, 2014
- Musical Meeresleuchten, ISMN 9790502433772
- Ballet Piano 1-30, ISMN 9790502439644, 2015
- Ballet Piano 31–60, ISMN 9790502436865, 2015
- Ballet Music for Exercises, ISMN 9790502439859, 2015
- 3 Scores for Jazz Ensemble, ISMN 9790502430368, 2015
- Brass Duets, String Quartet, Piano Solo, ISMN 9790502439996, 2015
- Nocturnes for Piano Solo, ISMN 9790502439835, 2015
- Modality, Modal Pieces for Chamber Orchestra, ISMN 9790502439842, 2015
- Ballet Suite, In Monets Garden, ISMN 9790502439880, 2015
- Ballet Music for Dancers, ISMN 9790502439934, 2015
- Piano Solos, 10 pieces for the piano, ISMN 9790502439811, 2015
- Pieces for Chamber Orchestra, ISMN 9790502439838, 2015
- Meeresleuchten, Musical, ISMN 9790502439897, 2015
- Impressions, Musical Scores for Chamber Orchestra, ISMN 9790502439873, 2015
- Piano Music for Ballet 1–30, ISMN 9790502439750, 2015
- Piano Music for Ballet 31–60, ISMN 9790502439767, 2016
- Nocturne for String Quartet, ISMN 9790502434762, 2016
- Woodwinds Nocturne, Chamber Music, ISMN 9790502439743, 2016
- Ballet Suite No.2, ISMN 9790502435790, 2017
- Impromptu No.2, ISMN 9790502435622, 2017
- Code d' Azur Suite, Piece for Small Orchestra, ISMN 9790502436919, 2018
- Impromptu 3, ISMN 9790502438005, 2020
- Vier Jahreszeiten, ISMN 9790502439002, 2020
- Tuesdays Nocturne, ISMN 9790502438029, 2020
- Regentropfen, ISMN 9790502438050, 2020
- A Quiet Autumn, ISMN 9790502437077, 2020
- One Ruby Tuesday, ISMN 9790502437381, 2020
- Forty Four, ISMN 9790502439408, 2022
- September Piece, ISMN 9790502439446, 2022
- Saturday Dreaming, ISMN 9790502439491, 2022
- Tanz der Prinzessin, ISMN 9790502439538, 2022
- Walzer, ISMN 9790502439576, 2022
- July, ISMN 9790502439606, 2022
- August, ISMN 9790502436308, 2022
- QUARTEN UND ELF ACHTEL, ISMN 9790502436346, 2022
- Pianomusic for Ballet, ISMN 9790502437770, 2022
- Pianomusic for Ballet 2, ISMN 9790502436407, 2022
- Mohnblume: Sopran Solo, ISMN 9790502436377, 2022
- Rhythm Changes 4, ISMN 9790502436438, 2022
- Samstag: Kammermusik, ISMN 979–0502436445, 2022
- TIME IN SPACE: Kammermusik, ISMN 9790502437220, 2022
- Thursday: Kammermusik, ISMN 9790502437091, 2022
- Saxophone Quartet Music Vol.1, ISMN 9790502437237, 2022
- Saxophone Quartet Music Vol.2, ISMN 9790502437268, 2022
- Peace: Kammermusik, ISMN 9790502437312, 2022

=== Books ===
- Xa-Lando – Lernen als Abenteuer. Materialien. Lesen – Sprache – Sachunterricht, Beteiligung, Schöningh Verlag im Westermann Druck- und Verlagsgruppe|Westermann Schulbuchverlag, 1997, ISBN 978-3-14-063101-3
- JeKi elementar – Grundlagen Materialien Ideen – Beteiligung, Musikproduktion 2 CDs für Schott Music, 2011, ISBN 978-3-7957-5248-4
- Sylt Impressionen – Bilder Musik Prosa – Edition Scores&Parts, 2011, ISMN 978-0-50243-102-0
- Ballet Music For Exercises 1- 5, Edition Scores&Parts, Dortmund, 2013, ISBN 9783955771027

=== Music Scores ===
==== Piano Solo • New Music ====
- Provocation • Audio/Video • ISRC DESN91300141
- Fire and Ice • Audio/Video • ISRC DESN91300140
- Ballet Music for Piano • Exercises 1–60 • Edition Scores&Parts • 2014
- Monday • ISMN 9790502431969 • Edition Scores&Parts • 2014

==== Duets ====
Tuba, Piccolo

- Duet for Tuba and Piccolo • Audio/Video • ISRC DESN91300139

Oboe, Trombone

- Duet for Oboe and Trombone • Audio/Video • ISRC DESN91300138

==== Ensemble Music, Scores incl. Audio ====
Flute, Oboe, Strings, Cello, Harp, Piano, Bass

- Impressions 1–36 • Edition Scores&Parts • 2013

Flute, Oboe, Piano

- Modality 1–8 • Edition Scores&Parts • 2013

Flute, Oboe, Harp, Bassoon, Bass

- Modality 09 La Mer and Fuge • Edition Scores&Parts • 2013

Flute, Oboe, Strings, Harp

- Modality 10–11 • Edition Scores&Parts • 2013

Jazz Orchestra

- Jazz Rhythm Changes One - Three • Edition Scores&Parts • 2013

Flute, Oboe, Violins, Cello, Harp, Piano, Bass

- Homer's Epic Odyssey III Album 1–23 • Edition Scores&Parts • 2013

Flute, Oboe, Violins, Cello, Harp, Bass

- Ballet Suite - In Monets Garden • Edition Scores&Parts • 2014

String Quartet

- Whole Tone piece for String Quartet • ISMN 9790502431846
- Twelve-tone composition for String Quartet • ISMN 9790502431914

Flute, Oboe, Clarinet, Harp

- Impromptu • ISMN 9790502431952

Flute, Cor Anglais, Piano

- Perfect Fourth Game • ISMN 9790502433147
