= Friedrich Ludwig Lindner =

German writer, journalist and physician

- Born: 23 October 1772; Mitau, Courland
- Died: 11 May 1845 (aged 72); Stuttgart, Württemberg
- Occupations: Physician; Writer; Journalist
- Spouse: Elise Reiffinger
- Parent(s): Ehregott Friedrich Lindner (1733-1816); Henriette Marie Wirth (1744–1807)

Friedrich Ludwig Lindner (23 October 1772 - 11 May 1845) was a German writer, journalist and medical doctor.

== Life ==
=== Family provenance ===
Friedrich Ludwig Lindner was born in Mitau, a prosperous midsized town in Courland (modern day Latvia) which at that time was an increasingly semi-detached territory in the Polish–Lithuanian Commonwealth. His father, Ehregott Friedrich Lindner (1733-1816) was a physician: his mother, born Henriette Marie Wirth (1744–1807), was the daughter of another physician.

=== Early years ===
He attended school in Mitau before moving on, in 1790, to start his university-level education, under the sponsorship of Johann Friedrich von Recke, at Mitau's Academia Petrina where he studied theology. In Autumn 1791 he moved on to Jena where, having enrolled to pursue his study of theology, in 1792, he switched to Medicine. One of his fellow medical students at Jena, who became a friend, was David Veit. There were also early literary efforts at this stage which involved the poet Sophie Mereau. From Jena he moved on to Würzburg and Göttingen where he found time to start work on a novel entitled "Die Wanderungen und Schicksale des Paters Abilgärd" ("The wanderings and destinies of Father Abilgärd"). In 1797 he returned to Jena where he concluded his studies with a dissertation for which he received his doctorate in medicine. In 1800 he worked, briefly, in Vienna as a physician. In 1802 he introduced vaccinations against Chickenpox in Brno. At the end of 1803, still from Vienna, he renewed his literary relationship with Sophie Mereau. Working with Joseph Schreyvogel, during this period he co-edited a weekly newspaper in Vienna called "Das Sonntagsblatt" ("The Sunday News sheet"). He remained in Vienna till the end of 1809.

=== Middle years ===
In 1809 Lindner abandoned his medical work, which he found insufficiently fulfilling and moved again, traveling via Munich, Regensburg, Nuremberg and Bayreuth. He ended up relocating to Weimar, close to Jena where he had studied as a student, and where he now took a writing job with the polymath publisher Friedrich Justin Bertuch. It was also in 1810 that he visited his uncle, the physician-theologian Gottlob Immanuel Lindner (1734–1818), who had been born (like Lindner's father) in Königsberg, but at this stage lived and worked in Strasbourg. Here he fell seriously ill, which caused him to stay with his uncle for longer than originally planned: he was nursed by a widow whose husband had been a French government official. It was still 1810 when he married Elise, who had been born at Huningue (on the southern tip of Elsaß, close to Basel) in 1789, as Elise Reiffinger. The marriage was childless but not joyless: sources indicate that during their later years Elise Lindner became an unusually influential spouse.

In 1813, by now living in Jena, with a fresh outbreak of fighting, Lindner was officially entrusted with the billeting of francophone troops, partly because he had mastered the French language. As calm returned to the streets he was rewarded for his hitherto unacknowledged teaching work when he was given a post as a university professor of philosophy. Although little is known of his attitude to the respective belligerents in the 25-year "world war" that provided the backdrop for much of his life, it does appear that the successive reverses suffered by the French as their armies were rolled back after October 1813 left him unmoved. However, in 1814 he surrendered his professorship at Jena and returned initially to Weimar and then, with Elise, moved back to his father's home in Courland. He stayed and ran his father's affairs till the latter's death in May 1816.

=== After the war ===
In April 1817 Lindner returned to Weimar where he took on the editorship of a newspaper called the "Oppositionsblatt" ("Opposition Newspaper"). However, the backwash from a "press scandal" caused him to leave Weimar later the same year. This resulted from an "indiscretion" involving a secret report written by a man called August von Kotzebue.

Von Kotzebue was employed by the Russian Tsar's "Foreign Ministry" and provided the Tsar with reports covering developments in politics, literature, economics, finance, education and what was going on more generally at the local university (in Jena). Although he came to be detested by liberals as a "Russian spy" it might be argued that von Kotzebue's reports contained nothing that was not in the public domain, and were no more than any foreign office employee working for any foreign power might have been expected to provide in a period of heightened political nervousness. Von Kotzebue and the Tsar were not in sympathy with liberal developments in political thought. In his report von Kotzebue criticised a newspaper called "Nemesis". Lindner happened to live in the same house as a copying clerk employed by von Kotzebue's: a copy of the report fell into Lindner's hands and Lindner sent it, accompanied by an anonymous letter, to the editor of "Nemesis", whose name was Heinrich Luden, in order that von Kotzebue's secret report might be published in the publication of which it was critical. The efficiency of the censor saw to it that the edition of "Nemesis" containing the report was not widely seen, but another editor, Ludwig Wieland got hold of the document and published it in another (low circulation) newspaper called "Der Volksfreunde" (The Friend of the People) in January 1818. The Russian government put pressure on the authorities locally to ensure Lindner's expulsion. (Von Kotzebue became so detested that he, too, had to leave the area, moving to Mannheim where in 1819 he was assassinated by the theology student, Karl Ludwig Sand.)

Lindner now settled for a period in Mulhouse, not far from the town where his wife had been born, but he did not remain in Elsaß for long. He was able to use his contacts to embark on a new career focused on diplomatic work and journalism. He participated in the Congress of Aix-la-Chapelle in September 1818 as a representative of Baden and of neighbouring Württemberg. In December of the same year he took over the editorship of a publication owned by the wealthy industrialist-publisher Johann Friedrich Cotta, and relocated to Stuttgart. The publication in question appears to have been shortlived, but in July 1819 he took on another title in von Cotta's collection, the newly founded "Tribüne, Würtemberg. Zeitung für Verfassung und Volkserziehung zur Freiheit" ("... newspaper for constitutional and popular education towards freedom").

As a journalist, Lindner showed himself to be a supporter of the new king, William I of Württemberg, even where this sometimes ran counter to the views of his newspaper's proprietor, Johann Friedrich Cotta. The most significant outcome of a collaboration between Lindner and the king was a document that appeared in 1820 entitled "Manuscript aus Süddeutschland". The document advocated some form of alliance between the three or four larger states of southern Germany, together with other significant states in the central regions, in order to provide a more effective counterweight to the might of Prussia and Austria within the German Confederation, a pan-German political structure which had emerged in 1815 to fill the vacuum left by the termination in 1806 of the Holy Roman Empire. The proposal was seen as a move to reinvent the Confederation of the Rhine which, starting in 1805, had operated under the sponsorship of France for almost a decade. Among many who held power within the German lands, such ideas were not to be welcomed: the document was actually published in London. The proposals in it were powerfully and sometimes violently attacked both within and outside Germany. The name of its author, G. Erichson, was assumed to be a pseudonym, but the real author's identity was not immediately known, and Lindner himself was accordingly spared the sanctions that would otherwise have fallen upon him. The initiative for the publication is indeed believed to have come from the king of Württemberg, but it subsequently became widely believed that the "Manuscript" had actually been written by Friedrich Ludwig Lindner.

The appearance in 1824 of a second incendiary publication entitled "Geheime Papiere" ("Secret Papers") proved more damaging since the work was quickly attributed to him despite initial expressions of uncertainty. Around this time he also became involved in a dispute with a young ambitious delegate to the Federal Convention (Bundestag) called Friedrich von Blittersdorf. The upshot of all this was that he was obliged to leave Stuttgart, relocating to Augsburg in 1825.

In May 1827 he moved on to Munich, where he re-established contact with Cotta and took on the editorship of the "Politische Annalen", a position that from 1828 he shared with the poet Heinrich Heine. The journal proved relatively short-lived, but a friendship with Heine endured. Following the demise of the "Politische Annalen" Lindner reverted to his earlier profession, becoming a physician again.

He returned to Stuttgart in 1833, where he was now provided by the king with a pension. Relatively little is known of his final years, but he produced several translations as well as a satirical play attacking Hegel, who during his final years had become, in the eyes of some, Prussia's unofficial national philosopher.
