= Gallus Guggumos =

German composer

Gallus Guggumos, probably Guggenmoos or Guggenmoser (c. 1590 – c. 1666), was a German composer. He was sent by Albrecht VI of Bavaria (1584–1666) to study with Giovanni Gabrieli in Venice. His Latin motets were recorded by Il Canto Figurato, Ulm in 2008.
