= Adolf Jensen =

German musician (1837–1879)

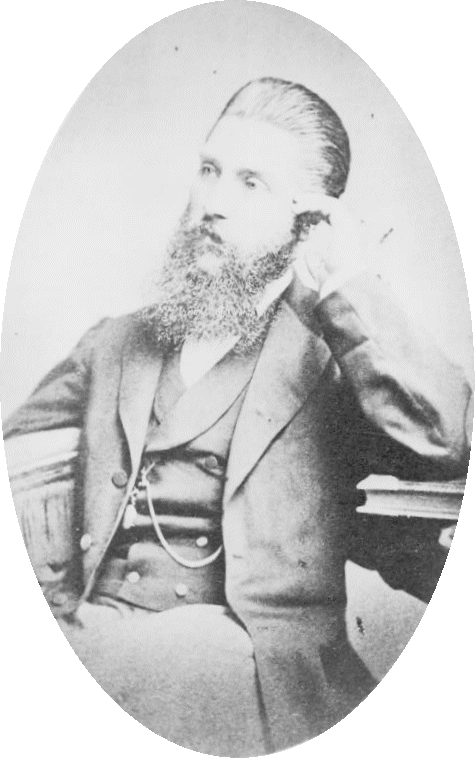
Adolf Jensen

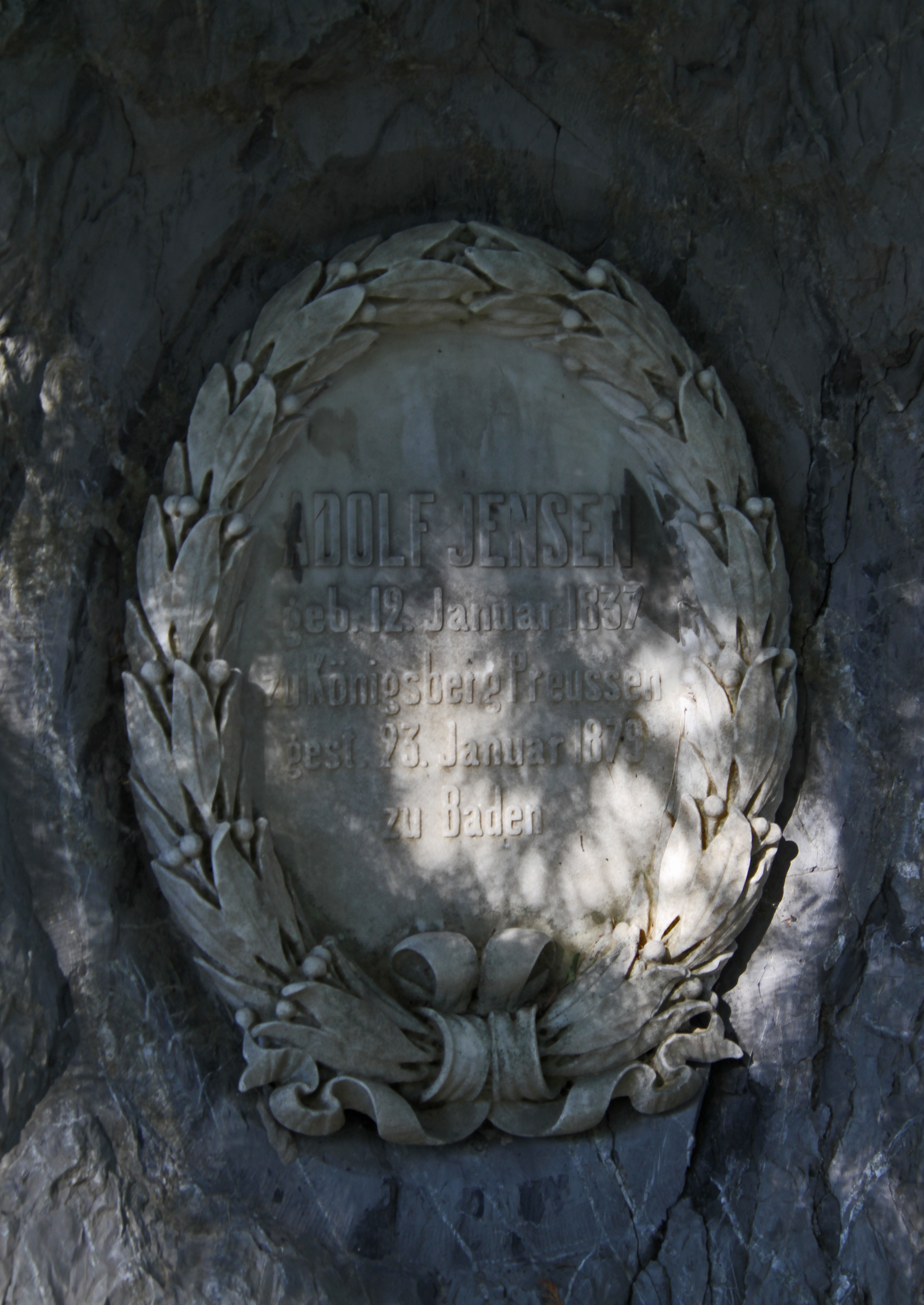
Grave monument in the main cemetery of Baden-Baden

Adolf Jensen (12 January 1837 – 23 January 1879) was a German pianist, composer and music teacher.

== Biography ==
Jensen was born in Königsberg to a family of musicians. Although largely self-taught, he also had instruction from Louis Ehlert, Louis Köhler and Friedrich Marpurg (1825–1884). Marpurg was the director of the Königsberg Theater and the great-grandson of the music theorist Friedrich Wilhelm Marpurg. In 1856, Jensen went to Russia to teach in the hope of earning enough money to take lessons with Robert Schumann with whom he had been in correspondence. However, Schumann had died in the interim. In 1857, he became was the music director of the Posen municipal theatre. From 1858 until 1860, he lived in Copenhagen and befriended Niels Gade. He returned to Königsberg and composed much of his music during that time. He taught advanced piano at Carl Tausig's Schule des höheren Clavierspiels in Berlin from 1866 until 1868 when serious illness forced him to retire. He went to Dresden, then to Graz in 1870, and finally to Baden-Baden where he died of tuberculosis at the age of 42.

His brother was Gustav Jensen (1843–1895), a violinist and composer.

== Works ==
Jensen wrote about 160 art songs as well as choral pieces. His music for piano includes a Sonata in F sharp minor (Op. 25), a set of 25 Études (Op. 32), and Erotikon, Op. 44, seven pieces depicting scenes from Greek legends. He also wrote music for piano four hands.

His orchestral music consisted of a Concert Overture in E minor and a Geistliches Tonstück. He started work on an opera, Die Erbin von Montfort in 1864-65, but did not finish it. After his death, Wilhelm Kienzl adapted the music to a new libretto, Turandot, written by Jensen's daughter Elsbeth, who wrote under the pseudonym "Egbert Jensen".
