= Bartholf Senff =

German music publisher

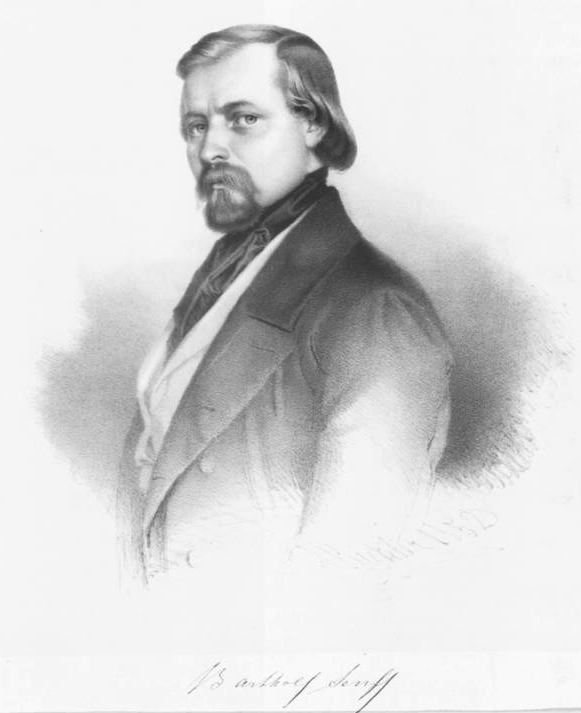
Bartholf Senff

Bartholf Senff (2 September 1815 – 25 June 1900) was a German music publisher from Friedrichshall, Coburg. In 1850, he founded the publishing house which bears his name in Leipzig. His catalog contains original editions of Mendelssohn, Brahms, Gade, Hiller, and Rubinstein, as well as the education works by Louis Köhler. In addition, Senff was the founder, editor, and proprietor of the well known periodical Signale für die musikalische Welt.
