= Friedrich Lindner (composer) =

Friedrich Lindner (c. 1542, Legnica – September 15, 1597, Nuremberg) was a German composer, singer, music editor, copyist, and writer on music. He was educated at the Schulpforta school at the Pforta monastery and at the University of Leipzig. Composer Jakob Meiland engaged him at the Ansbach court in 1564 as a music copyist and singer. He succeeded Meiland as vice-Kapellmeister at Ansbach in 1573. Financial issues led to the dissolution of the music department at Ansbach, and in 1574 he became Kantor at the St. Egidien, Nuremberg where he remained until his death in 1597.

Lindner's own compositional output consisted mainly of choral sacred music. He notably conducted his own work, Veni, Sance Spiritus, for the dedication ceremony of the University of Altdorf (opened in 1578 after building construction completed) on 29 June 1575. His biggest contribution to music was through his work as a music editor; notably editing nine large volumes of music from Italy which became one of the principal means through which Italian music spread into Germany in the late 16th century.
