= Licco Amar =

Hungarian violinist

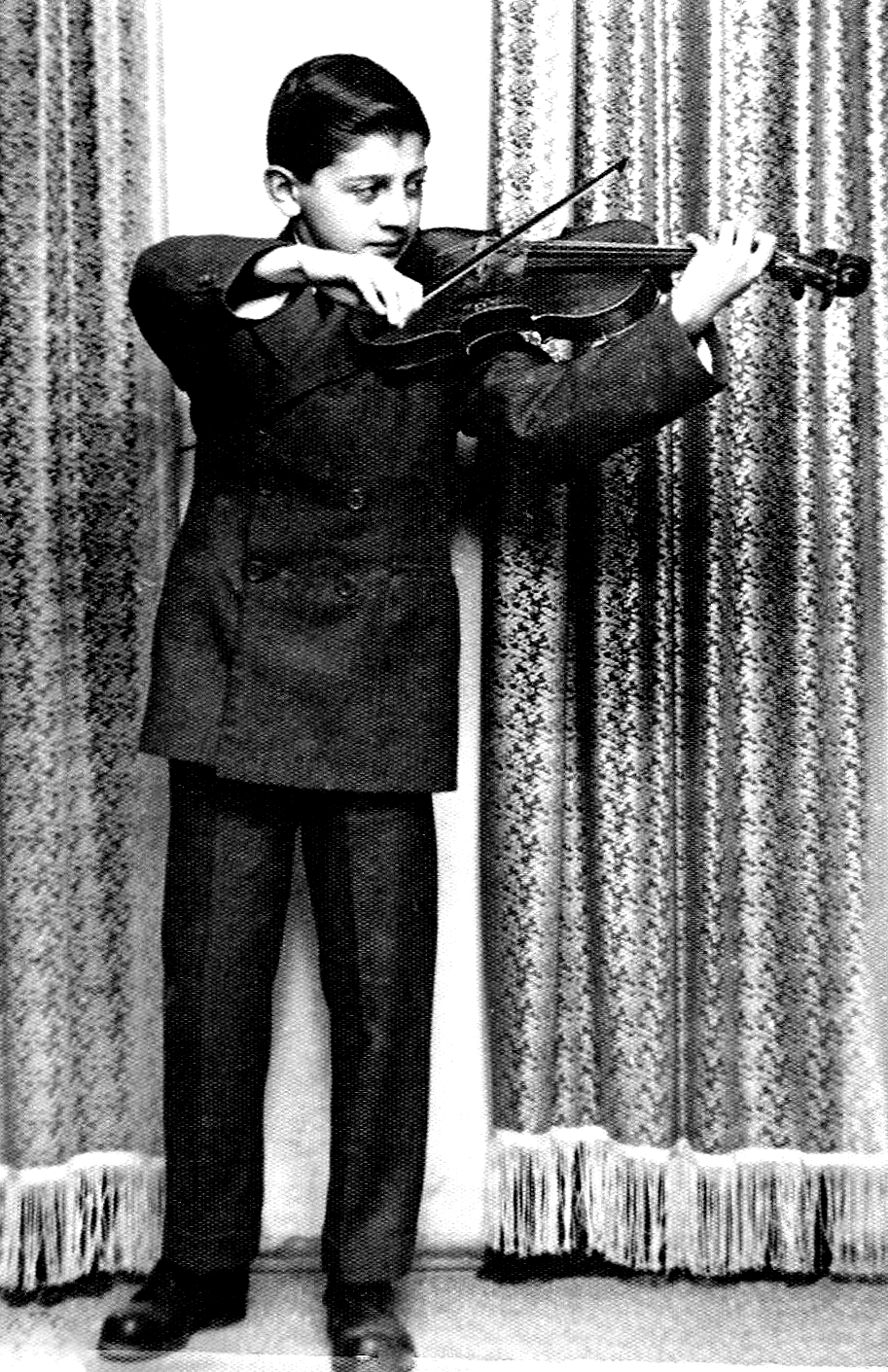
Licco Amar circa 1900

Licco Amar (4 December 1891 – 19 July 1959) was a Hungarian violinist.

== Life ==
Born in Budapest as an Ottoman citizen, Amar was the child of the Jewish merchant Michael Amar, who came from North Macedonia, and Regina Strakosch, of Austrian Jewish descend. Amar studied with Emil Baré at the Franz Liszt Academy of Music in his native city and in 1911 he went to Berlin to study at the Universität der Künste Berlin with Henri Marteau. From 1912 to 1924, Marteau accepted him as second violinist in his String Quartet, in which the cellist Hugo Becker also played. In 1912, Amar received the Mendelssohn Prize. He became concertmaster of the Berlin Philharmonic from 1916 to 1920 and changed to the Mannheim National Theatre from 1920 to 1923. His own string quartet, which he had founded in 1922 as the Amar Quartet, included Paul Hindemith as violist and, temporarily until its dissolution in 1929, Walter Kaspar, Rudolf Hindemith. For Hindemith's compositions, who dedicated the Sonata op. 31,1 to him, he arranged several world premieres, e.g. at the Donaueschinger Musiktage, and Maurits Frank. He also supported the composer Erich Walter Sternberg. In 1925 he and Emmy Matterstock married.

After the 1933 seizure of power by the Nazis, he could no longer work in Germany for racist reasons, emigrated to France and from there in 1934 to Turkey, where he was able to teach at the conservatory in Ankara for twenty years from 1935. In 1957 he received an engagement by the Hochschule für Musik Freiburg.

Amar died in Freiburg im Breisgau at the age of 68.
