= Hindemith (disambiguation) =

Paul Hindemith (1895–1963) was a German composer, violist, violinist, teacher and conductor.

Hindemith also refers to:

- Rudolf Hindemith (1900–1974), German cellist and conductor, brother of Paul
- Maria Landes-Hindemith (1901–1987), pianist, wife of Rudolf
- Harry Hindemith (1906–1973), German actor
- 5157 Hindemith, an asteroid discovered in 1973, named for Paul

== See also ==
- Hindemith Prize of the Schleswig-Holstein Musik Festival, named for Paul
- Hindemith Prize of the City of Hanau, named for Paul
