= Jürg Baur =

German composer

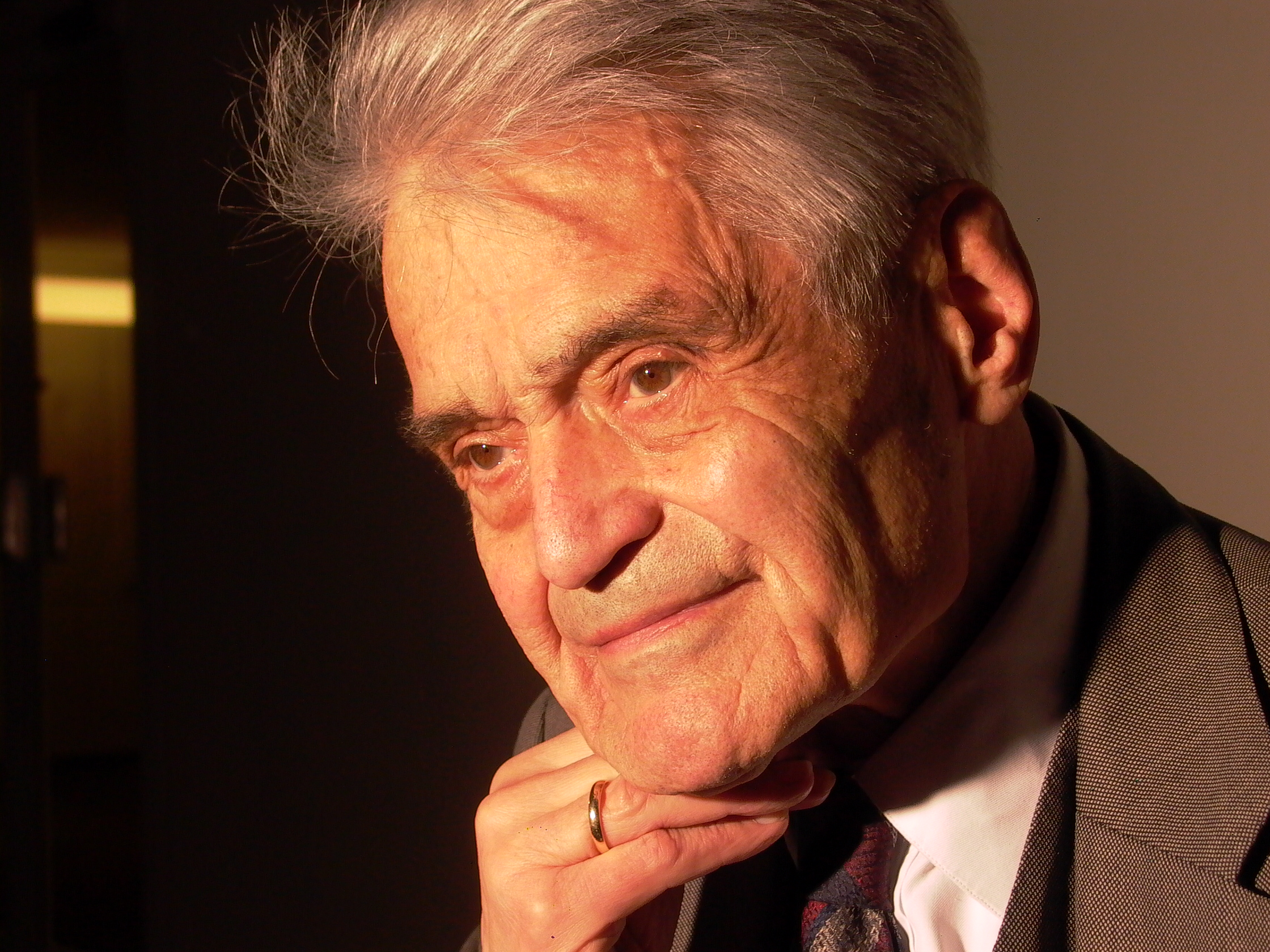
- Baur in 2008
- Born: 11 November 1918; Düsseldorf, Germany
- Died: 31 January 2010 (aged 91); Düsseldorf, Germany
- Education: Hochschule für Musik Köln; University of Cologne
- Occupations: Composer; Church musician; Academic teacher
- Organizations: Robert Schumann Hochschule; Hochschule für Musik Köln
- Awards: Villa Massimo; Duisburger Musikpreis

Jürg Baur (11 November 1918 – 31 January 2010) was a German composer whose works include Incontri and Mutazioni. Baur studied at the Cologne University of Music and taught there in his later years. Baur was also awarded the Federal Cross of Merit.

== Education ==
Baur was born in Düsseldorf, where he achieved early recognition as a composer at the age of 18, when his First String Quartet was premiered at the Düsseldorf Hindenburg Secondary School by the then-famous Prisca Quartet. He studied from 1937 to 1948 (interrupted by army service from 1939 to 1945, including several months as a Russian prisoner of war) at the Hochschule für Musik Köln (Cologne University of Music): composition with Philipp Jarnach, piano with Karl Hermann Pillney, and organ and sacred music with Michael Schneider. Even before completing his conservatory studies, he was appointed lecturer in music theory at the Düsseldorf Conservatory in 1946. He did postgraduate studies in musicology with Karl Gustav Fellerer and Willi Kahl from 1948 to 1951 at the University of Cologne. In 1952 he was appointed choirmaster and organist at the St Paulus-Kirche in Düsseldorf, a post he left in 1960 when he was awarded a scholarship from the German Academy to study for six months at the Villa Massimo in Rome. He twice returned to Rome for extended visits, in 1968 and 1980. The vivid impression made by the Italian city is reflected in the Italian-titled works he composed there, including the Concerto romano for oboe and orchestra.

== Compositional career ==
Baur was one of the last composers of the old school. After the war, he remained faithful to his teacher Jarnach's conservative stance, and never became an extreme avant-gardist. Widespread recognition as a composer came comparatively late. Béla Bartók was his strongest stylistic influence at first, but in the 1950s he began to use twelve-tone technique. Anton Webern's music became his model in works such as the Third String Quartet (1952), the Quintetto sereno for wind quintet (1958)—which also uses aleatory techniques—the Sonata for two pianos (1957), and the Ballata romana (1960). Later, he developed a marked propensity for quotations from earlier music. Particularly striking examples include Isaac's "Innsbruck, ich muss dich lassen" in the Concerto da camera, a theme from Bach's Musical Offering in the Ricercari for organ, as well as in the Kontrapunkte 77 for three woodwinds, and Schumann themes in Sentimento del tempo and, especially, in Musik mit Robert Schumann. Other composers whose works Baur has quoted include Dvořák, Strauss, Gesualdo, Mozart and Schubert.

Primarily a composer of orchestral and instrumental music, Baur also produced a number of works for less mainstream instruments such as the recorder and the accordion. He was one of the first composers to introduce the recorder to the new musical trends of the post-war era, with Incontri (1960), for recorder and piano, Mutazioni (1962) and Pezzi uccelli (1964), both for unaccompanied alto recorder, and the virtuosic Concerto da camera "Auf der Suche nach der verlorenen Zeit", for recorder and chamber orchestra of 1975.

In his 87th year, Baur completed his only opera, Der Roman mit dem Kontrabass, to a libretto by Michael Leinert after the story by Anton Chekhov. Commissioned on the occasion of the composer's 85th birthday in 2003 by the Deutsche Oper am Rhein, it was premiered at the Partika-Saal of the Robert Schumann Hochschule, Düsseldorf, on 25 November 2005, with Marco Vassilli and Kerstin Pohle singing the two main roles (Smychkov and the Countess Anastasia), Szymon Marciniak as the solo contrabassist, and Thomas Gabrisch conducting.

== Teaching career ==
In 1965 Baur became director of the Robert Schumann Hochschule in Düsseldorf, where he was appointed professor in 1969. After Bernd Alois Zimmermann's death in 1971, Bauer succeeded him as teacher of composition at the Cologne Musikhochschule, where he remained until retiring in 1990.

== Honours ==
Baur's many distinctions include the Recklinghausen Young Generation Prize (1956), the Robert Schumann Prize of the city of Düsseldorf (1957), the Federal Cross of Merit (first class, 1970), and honorary membership of the German Music Council (1988), the North Rhine–Westphalia Service Award and the Duisburger Musikpreis (1994).

== Last years ==
In the summer of 2009, Baur and his wife Brunhild celebrated their 65th wedding anniversary. A few months later, however, Brunhild died and a change came over Baur, who until then had never appeared frail. He died in Düsseldorf on 31 January 2010 at the age of 91, just a few months after his wife, who was the same age.
