= Langenhan =

Langenhan is a surname. Notable people with the surname include:

- Andi Langenhan (born 1984), German luger
- Anna Hirzel-Langenhan (1874–1951), Swiss pianist and music educator
- Max Langenhan (born 1999), German luger

== See also ==
- Langenhan pistol
- Langerhans (disambiguation)
