= Ernst Bücken =

German musicologist

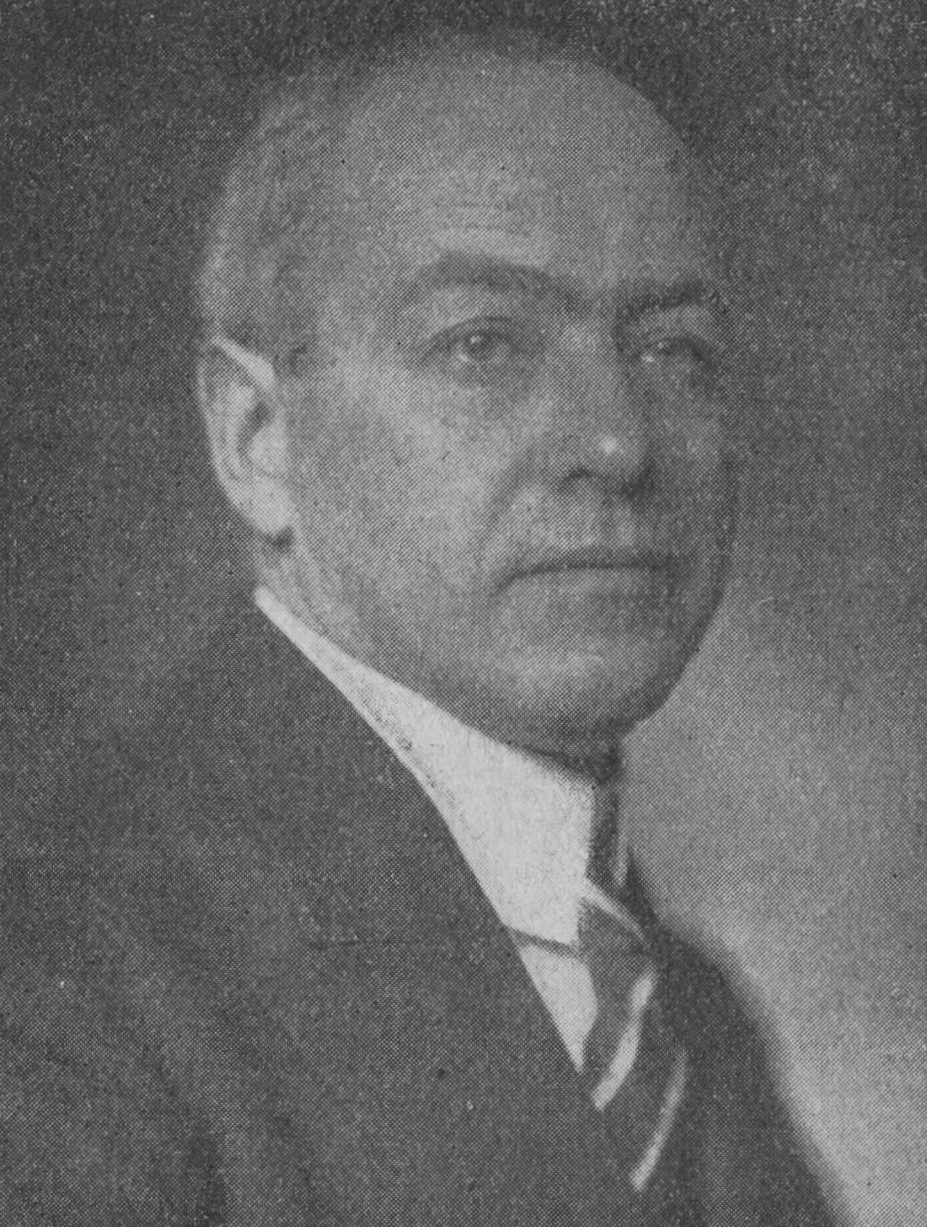
Image of Ernst Bücken

Ernst Bücken (2 June 1884 – 28 July 1949) was a German musicologist and university teacher.

== Life ==
Born in Aachen, Bücken, son of a director of a textile factory, first began studying law at the Rheinische Friedrich-Wilhelms-Universität Bonn. After moving to the Ludwig-Maximilians-Universität München he studied musicology with Adolf Sandberger, piano with Walter Braunfels and Anna Hirzel-Langenhan and music composition with Walter Courvoisier. Besides, he attended lectures in German language and literature and philosophy with Franz Muncker, Georg von Hertling, Oswald Külpe and Ernst von Aster. With his dissertation on Anton Reicha, his life and his compositions he was awarded a doctorate in 1912. In 1920, once habilitated, he went to Cologne and was appointed a. professor at the University of Cologne in 1925 and taught here until the war years. From 1936, Bücken was also a lecturer at the school music department of the Hochschule für Musik und Tanz Köln.

The "Handbuch der Musikwissenschaft" ("Bücken-Psalter"), which he published in 1927-1934 and with some contributions of his own, is important and was intended to support similar projects in literature and art studies.

During the Weimar Republic Bücken was a short-term member of the Deutsche Zentrumspartei. After the Nazis' seizure of power in January 1933, he joined the Nazi Party and was registered with effect from 1 May 1933 under the party number 2.026.645. In 1933 he also became a member of the Deutsche Akademie. In the following years he joined the National Socialist German Lecturers League and published various system-compliant writings, including Musik aus deutscher Art in 1934, published in the Schriften zur völkisch Bildung or in the same year a contribution in the Westdeutscher Beobachter Aufbruch in der Musikwissenschaft. Against unconditional intellectualism - music politics as a point of view, in which he spoke of the "heavy struggle of our ethnic-racial forces with other national powers". In the winter semester 1934/35 he held a lecture series on Decomposition and reconstruction of music since Wagner. As part of the 1938 Reichsmusiktage he gave a lecture at the musicology conference, a presentation on Musikstil, Musikpolitik und Musikkultur. In his 1941 publication Musik der Deutschen, eine Kulturgeschichte der deutschen Musik he hardly dealt with the development of music in Germany after 1933, but, according to Fred K. Prieberg, he adhered "to the music policy guidelines of the regime", whereby the following passage is found on p. 294, in which "Jewish names are mentioned only for the purpose of negative evaluation:

(…) Pathological phenomena were the music styles from expressionism and from atonality to futurism and constructivism, which were able to settle down more easily and quickly in the cultural organism, shaken and weakened by the lost war, than in a normal state. Both 'inventors' and main promoters of these musical currents artificially stimulated by events of the time were Jews throughout, who saw the dawn of 'their' great musical epoch. No German musical genius was greeted by their pioneers with such fanfares as the mixed-breed Franz Schreker was greeted by his racial comrade Paul Bekker. No truly great pioneer has been so celebrated as Arnold Schönberg.(…)

In 1945 Bücken was sent into retirement. He died on 28 July 1949 in Overath at the age of 65.

In the Soviet occupation zone, Bücken's Musik der Deutschen (1941) was included in the List of literature to be discarded in 1946. His book Musik aus deutscher Art (Schaffstein, Cologne 1934), published in 1934, was included in the list of literature to be discarded in the GDR in 1952/3.

== Work ==
- (ed.) Handbuch der Musikwissenschaft, 10 volumes, 1927–1934.
- Anton Reicha: sein Leben und seine Kompositionen, Dissertation Munich 1912.
- Der heroische Stil in der Oper, Leipzig 1924.
- (ed.) Die großen Meister der Musik, 12 volumes, Potsdam: Athenaion 1932–1939.
- Musik aus deutscher Art, Cologne 1934.
- Die Musik der Nationen – eine Musikgeschichte, 1937 (Kröners Taschenausgabe vol. 131)
- Wörterbuch der Musik, Leipzig 1940 (Sammlung Dieterich vol. 20).
- Musik der Deutschen, Cologne 1941.

== Literature ==
- Reichshandbuch der deutschen Gesellschaft – Das Handbuch der Persönlichkeiten in Wort und Bild. First volume, Deutscher Wirtschaftsverlag, Berlin 1930, ISBN 3-598-30664-4
- Ernst Klee: Das Kulturlexikon zum Dritten Reich. Wer war was vor und nach 1945. S. Fischer, Frankfurt am Main 2007, ISBN 978-3-10-039326-5, p. 87.
- Willi Kahl: 'Bücken, Ernst'. In Die Musik in Geschichte und Gegenwart. Volume 2, first edition, Bärenreiter, Kassel 1986, pp. 430–431, CD-Rom edition, pp. 10447–10448.
- Fred K. Prieberg: Handbuch Deutsche Musiker 1933–1945, CD-Rom-Lexikon, Kiel 2004, pp. 814–815.
