= Heinrich Dorn =

German conductor, composer, teacher, and journalist

Heinrich Ludwig Egmont Dorn
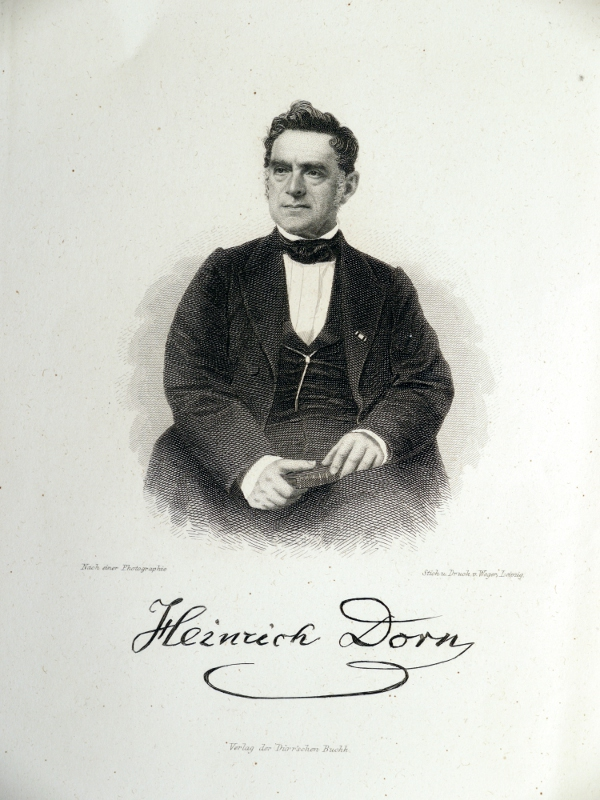
- Born: 14 November 1800 or 1804; Königsberg, Prussia (now Kaliningrad, Russia)
- Died: 10 January 1892; Berlin, Germany
- Education: Studied in Königsberg and Berlin
- Occupations: Conductor, composer, teacher, journalist
- Notable work: Rolands Knappen, Die Nibelungen

Heinrich Ludwig Egmont Dorn (14 November 1800 or 1804 – 10 January 1892) was a German conductor, composer, teacher, and journalist. He was born in Königsberg, where he studied piano, singing, and composition. Later, he studied in Berlin with Ludwig Berger, Bernhard Klein, and Carl Friedrich Zelter. His first opera, Rolands Knappen, was produced in 1826, and was a success. Around this time, he became co-editor of the Berliner allgemeine Musikzeitung.

Dorn became well known as a conductor of opera, and held theatre posts at Königsberg (1828), Leipzig (1829–32), Hamburg (1832), Riga (1834–43), and Cologne (1844–8). In 1849, he became co-conductor, with Wilhelm Taubert, of the Berlin Hofoper - a post he held until 1869.

Dorn taught counterpoint to Clara Schumann and Robert Schumann, and was a friend of Franz Liszt. He was a harsh critic of Richard Wagner but was persuaded to conduct the opera Tannhäuser, in 1855. He also wrote an opera Die Nibelungen, based on the Nibelungenlied, in 1853, many years before Wagner completed Der Ring des Nibelungen.

Dorn died in Berlin in 1892.

== Writings ==
- Spontini in Deutschland (Leipzig, 1830)
- Aus meinem Leben (Berlin, 1870–77)
- Das provisorische Statut der Königlichen Akademie der Künste in Berlin (Berlin, 1875)

== Compositions ==
- Rolands Knappen (1826)
- Der Zauberer und das Ungetüm (1827)
- Die Bettlerin (1828)
- Abu Kara (c. 1831)
- Der Schöffe von Paris (1838)
- Das Banner von England (1841)
- Die Nibelungen (1854)
- Ein Tag in Russland (1856)
- Gewitter bei Sonnenschein (1865)
- Der Botenläufer von Pirna (1865)

== Sources ==
- Robert Eitner: Dorn, Heinrich. Allgemeine Deutsche Biographie (ADB). Volume 48, Duncker & Humblot, Leipzig 1904, p 35–37. (in German)
- Willi Kahl: Neue Deutsche Biographie (NDB). Volume 4, Duncker & Humblot, Berlin 1959, p. 79. (in German)
- Peck Leverett, Adelyn, and Fifield, Christopher. "Heinrich Dorn". Grove Music Online (subscription access).
