= Ernest Sauter =

German composer

Ernest Sauter (July 9, 1928 – December 8, 2013) was a German composer.

== Biography ==
After early childhood in Munich, his parents moved to Leipzig in 1935. Due to his very conservative family he only was introduced to music of Classical Period and German Romantic Music up to Richard Wagner with the complete lack of contemporary music. The composer Felix Petyrek who gave the young Sauter piano lessons in his home was the first to introduce him to new music. Sauter then joined the famous Thomasschule where the so-called "Bachpflege" as part of his musical lessons sensitized his hearing. At war end in 1945 on the run back to Munich nearly all of his first compositions were destroyed or lost. The composition "Saitenspiel" was one of the few rescued compositions.

In 1947 after passing his university entrance diploma Sauter began studying piano at the Akademie der Tonkunst in Munich. Unfortunately he had to abandon his studies due to financial reasons. He continued taking private piano lessons with Maria Landes-Hindemith where he was introduced to her husband Rudolf Hindemith (of Paul Hindemith's brother) who gave him new motivation to start composing again. Over time this influence was too less progressive and led to a discord based on Hindemiths criticism of the musica viva concert series founded by Karl Amadeus Hartmann in 1945.

In the late fifties Sauter discovered the ballet genre and joined the Junge Ballett Compagnie (JBC, Deutsches Ballett-Theater, Bonn) where he first did arrangements "Es war eine köstliche Zeit" broadcast by the Bayerischer Rundfunk and instrumentations (Bizet, Jeux d’enfants). Sauter composed his first ballet "Blue Jeans" for the JBC which was broadcast by the Saarländischer Rundfunk The closure of the JBC led to a mental and financial crisis for Sauter which in succession let his self-criticism destroy some of his non published compositions.

In 1965 Sauter got an offer from Yvonne Georgi the head of the ballet at the Staatsoper Hannover to write the music for a new ballet called "Finale". Despite a successful performance the collaboration with Georgi had to end due to her sudden retirement. In 1976 he wrote a quadrophonic scenic music ("Remontage") which had its debut performance at the "Tage der neuen Musik" in Hannover in 1977. The "Requiem für eine Tänzerin" a "Tape Music for Dancers" produced by Germinal Casado followed in 1978 and was a long running great success

Sauter had concerns to be rated solely as a ballet composer. This and his wish to be independent and perhaps also the desire to "be somewhere else" led to the decision to relocate to the South of France. Thanks to the support of his friends, foremost of the conductor George Alexander Albrecht, Sauter was able to get to work in the solitude and quietness of the Provence without losing the connection to the outside world. There in 1983/84 the first feature-length piece, a ballet "Till Eulenspiegel" based on de Costers novel La Légende d’Ulenspiegle was created. Again a commissioned work for the Staatsoper Hannover. In 1986 Sauter choose Suzette a small village in the Dentelles near Avignon and Orange as new residence. There he composed his first piano concerto ("Concerto Russe") devoted to Gerhard Oppitz who played the debut performance on the occasion of the Tchaikovski year 1993 in Hanover.

The wish to create his own sphere let him organize an annual summer festival called "Festival MUSIQUE D ÉTÉ À SUZETTE" for chamber music ensembles in the small church of Suzette. It was his goal to present not only classical pieces to the interested audience but also pieces of contemporary composers like Penderecki, Ligeti, Schnittke etc. After several years of groundwork Sauter was able to compose own pieces for the festival and have them performed by artists of international reputation. The 3 string trios devoted to and performed by the "Deutsches Streichtrio" and "Verrà La Morte" for soprano and string quartet performed by Christina Ascher and the Szymanowski-Quartet are vivid examples.

== Selected works ==
Stage

- Blue Jeans Story, ballet for the "Junge Ballett-Compagnie" (1960); TV-recording at Saarländischer Rundfunk
- Finale, ballet (1963)
- Till Eulenspiegel, feature-length ballet (1984); commissioned work for the Staatsoper Hannover

Orchestral

- Variations Classique (1960)

Concertante

- Concert Russe, Concert for piano and orchestra (1991); commissioned work for the Niedersächsische Staatsorchester, Hannover, dedicated to Gerhard Oppitz
- Essai sur "l'accord prométhéen" for viola solo and string orchestra (2000); revision of the 1988 version for viola solo and string trio

Chamber music

- Sonata for viola solo (1974)
- Remontage, electroacoustic tape-music (1976); commissioned work for the Hochschule für Musik, Theater und Medien Hannover
- Métrages for flute, harp and percussion (1982); soundtrack to an abstract movie directed by Kurt Kranz
- Essai sur "l'accord prométhéen" for viola solo and string trio (1988)
- String Trio (1999)
- Ballade for violin, viola and cello (2001)
- Musique Romantique for cello solo and string trio; "À la mémoire d'Arenski" (2005)
- Trio No. 3 for violin, viola and cello (2007)

Piano

- Drei Studien, inspired by the 51 Exercises for two pianos by Johannes Brahms (1981)
- Toccata sur le nom B-A-C-H for piano (2000)

Vocal

- Saitenspiel, 6 short choral pieces based on Japanese lyrics (1945); translated by Manfred Hausmann
- Verrà la morte, Music for mezzo-soprano and string quartet (1997); words by Cesare Pavese

All published compositions by Ernest Sauter are archived at the German Composer Archive

- 1984 Till Eulenspiegel Notizen nach getaner Arbeit; Edition Kunzelmann GmbH, Adliswil/Zürich
- 1972 Instrumentation, ein Versuch über die Arbeit mit dem Klang, script for a broadcast series at Bayerischer Rundfunk; also available as printed copy from Verlag Walter Wollenweber

== Sources ==
- 1967 NZ, Neue Zeitschrift für Musik, February 2, S.54, Hannover, Ballett-Uraufführung(Erich Limmert)
- 1978 Neue Hannoversche/Hannoversche Presse Nr.24 v.28:/29. Januar 1978 Zur Person (RH)
- 1984 Theaterzeitung Mai Till Eulenspiegel Uraufführung (W.K.)
- 1992 Judith G. Prieberg, Der Komponist Ernest Sauter, Beobachtungen und Notizen in: Werkverzeichnis Ernest Sauter, Verlag Albert Kunzelmann, Lottstetten
- 1993 Theater-Magazin der Niedersächsischen Staatstheater Hannover, Februar 5. Konzert (B.W.)
- 2003 Helmut Rohm, "Abseits der Eitelkeiten, der Komponist Ernest Sauter", Bayern2Radio first broadcast July 28, 2003, Bayerischer Rundfunk 2003
- 2011 Roland Spiegel, alpha-Forum: Interview with the composer Ernest Sauter. First broadcast February 14, 2011, Bayerischer Rundfunk 2011

== Recordings ==
- 2010 All String Trios, Ars Produktion ARS 38 492 in Lizenz der BRW-Service GmbH• coproduction with Bayerischer Rundfunk • Producer: Annette Schumacher • ©Stiftung Ernest Sauter •(p)2010
