= Henri Marteau =

French violinist and composer

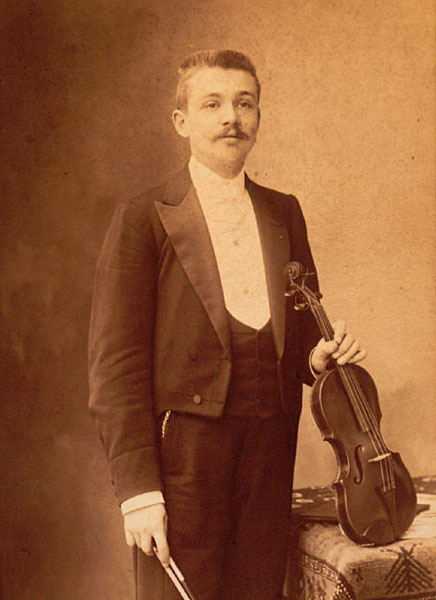
Marteau pictured by Nadar

Henri Marteau (31 March 1874 – 3 October 1934) was a French violinist and composer.

== Life and career ==
Marteau's debut was made when he was 10 at a concert given by the Vienna Philharmonic Society conducted by Hans Richter. A tour through Switzerland and Germany followed. A year later Charles Gounod selected him to play the obbligato of Vision de Jeanne d'Arc, composed for the Joan of Arc Centenary Celebration at Reims, where he also performed, before an audience of 2500 people, his teacher Léonard's Violin Concerto No. 5.

Marteau was an advocate of chamber music. On 13 April 1894, he, pianist Ami Lauchame, a violist named Koert, and a cellist named Hegner were reported to have given their second invitation chamber music concert in New York, performing works of Camille Saint-Saëns and Gabriel Fauré; a third concert was scheduled for the following week. By 1906, Marteau was leading a string quartet that broke up in a dispute over a work by Max Reger. In Berlin, he formed another string quartet with his student Licco Amar as second violinist and Hugo Becker as cellist; later, Becker's student George Georgescu would take over the cello position.

Marteau died of pneumonia on his estate in Lichtenberg, Bavaria, at the age of 60.

== Selected works ==
Stage

- Meister Schwalbe, Musical Comedy in 1 act (1922)

Concertante

- Andante for violin and orchestra (1891)
- Fantaisie in E major for violin and orchestra, Op. 3
- Cadenza for the Violin Concerto in D Major, Op. 77 by Johannes Brahms (1904)
- Concerto in B♭ major for cello and orchestra, Op. 7 (1905)
- Suite in A major for violin and orchestra, Op. 15
- Concerto in C major for violin and orchestra, Op. 18 (1919)

Chamber music

- Berceuse for violin and piano, Op. 1 (1902)
- Berceuse for violin and piano, Op. 2 No. 1
- Feuillet d'Album in D minor for viola and piano, Op. 2 No. 2
- Andantino in A minor for violin and piano, Op. 2 No. 3
- String Quartet No.1 in D♭ major, Op. 5
- Chaconne in C minor for viola and piano, Op. 8 (1905)
- String Quartet No.2 in D major, Op. 9 (1905)
- Trio in F minor for violin, viola and cello, Op. 12 (1907)
- Quintet in C minor for clarinet and string quartet, Op. 13 (1908)
- Études d'archet (Bowing Studies) for violin with violin accompaniment, Op. 14 (1910)
- String Quartet No.3 in C major, Op. 17 (1921)
- Études de gammes (Scale Studies) for violin, Op. 19 (1916)
- Sérénade for 2 flutes, 2 oboes, 2 clarinets, bass clarinet and 2 bassoons, Op. 20 (1922)
- 24 Caprices d'execution transcendante for violin and piano, Op. 25 (1919)
- Fantaisie for organ and violin, Op. 27 (1910)
- Terzetto for flute, violin and viola, Op. 32 (1924)
- Sonata Fantastica for violin solo, Op. 35 (1927)
- Partita for flute and viola, Op. 42 No. 2
- Divertimento for flute and violin, Op. 43 No. 1

Keyboard

- Trois Compositions for organ, Op. 23 (1918)

Vocal

- Ave Maria for voice, violin, harp (piano) and organ (harmonium), Op. 4 No. 1
- 8 Songs for voice and string quartet, Op. 10 (1906)
- Huit mélodies, Op.19c 1. "Pluie" ("Il pleut. J'entends le bruit égal des eaux" Victor Hugo), 2. "À Douarnenez en Bretagne" ("On respire du sel dans l'air" Sully Prudhomme), 3. "Ritournelle" ("Dans la plaine blonde et sous les allées" François Coppée) 4. "Matin d'octobre" ("C'est l'heure exquise et matinale" Coppée) 5. "Chanson de mer" ("Ton sourire infini m'est cher" Sully Prudhomme) 6. "Vitrail" ("Sur un fond d'or pâli, les saints rouges et bleus" Coppée) 7. "Pitié des choses" (Coppée) 8. "Dans la rue, le soir" ("Neuf heures. On entend la retraite aux tambours." Coppée)
- Acht Gesänge, Op.28 1. "Stille Fahrt" ("Ich stand an einem dunklen Meer" Hans Benzmann) 2 "Die Eichbäume" ("Aus den Gärten komm' ich zu euch, ihr Söhne des Berges!" Friedrich Hölderlin, 3. "Abendlied" ("Die Nacht ist niedergangen" Otto Bierbaum), 4. "Empor!" ("Nun breite stolze Schwingen aus" Adolf Holst), 5. "Gipfelndes Glück" ("Ein Duft weht überall" Carmen Sylva) 6. "Regenlied" ("Walle, Regen, walle nieder" Klaus Groth) 7. "Hütet Euch" ("Wo am Herd ein Brautpaar siedelt" Emanuel Geibel), 8. "Liebesnacht" ("O weile, süßer Geliebter! Martin Greif)
- Drei geistliche Gesänge (Three Sacred Songs) for medium voice and organ, Op. 29 (1923)
- Fünf Schilflieder for baritone, viola and piano, Op. 31; words by Nikolaus Lenau 1. "Drüben geht die Sonne scheiden" 2. "Trübe wird's, die Wolken jagen" 3. "Auf geheimem Waldespfade" 4. "Sonnenuntergang; Schwarze Wolken zieh'n" 5. "Auf dem Teich, dem Regungslosen"
- 2 Ballades for voice and piano, Op. 34 (1924)

Choral

- Drei Lieder (Three Songs) for mixed chorus, Op. 33 (1924)
- La voix de Jeanne d'Arc, Cantata for soprano, chorus and orchestra

== Sources ==
- Sadie, S. (ed.) (1980) The New Grove Dictionary of Music & Musicians, [vol. # 11].
- The Memoirs of Carl Flesch 1957
- An Encyclopedia of the Violin - Alberto Bachmann 1875
- Violin Virtuosos - Henry Roth 1997

=== CD Releases ===
- Henri Marteau: Concerto in C major for violin and orchestra, Op. 18 and Serenade Op. 20 - Nicolas Koeckert and the Deutsche Radio Philharmonie Saarbrücken Kaiserslautern (Solo Musica SM 299)
- Henri Marteau: Huit mélodies, Op. 19c and Op. 28 - Vesselina Kasarova and Fünf Schilflieder for baritone, viola and piano, Op. 31 - Dietrich Fischer-Dieskau (Solo Musica SM 263)
- Henri Marteau: Quintet in C minor for clarinet and string quartet, Op. 13 and Serenade, Op. 20 - Mark Lieb and the Phoenix Ensemble (with Alexander v. Zemlinsky's Trio, Op 3) (Navona Records NV 6076), Feb. 2017
- Henri Marteau: Quintet in C minor for clarinet and string quartet, Op. 13 - Praetorius Quartett and String Quartet No.2 in D major, Op. 9 - Marteau Quartett (Solo Musica SM 282)
- Henri Marteau: Discovery of a Romanticist (Solo Musica SM 229)
- Henri Marteau: string quartets, Vol. 1 - Isasi Quartet (CPO 555 128-2)
