= Erich Walter Sternberg =

Israeli composer (1891–1974)

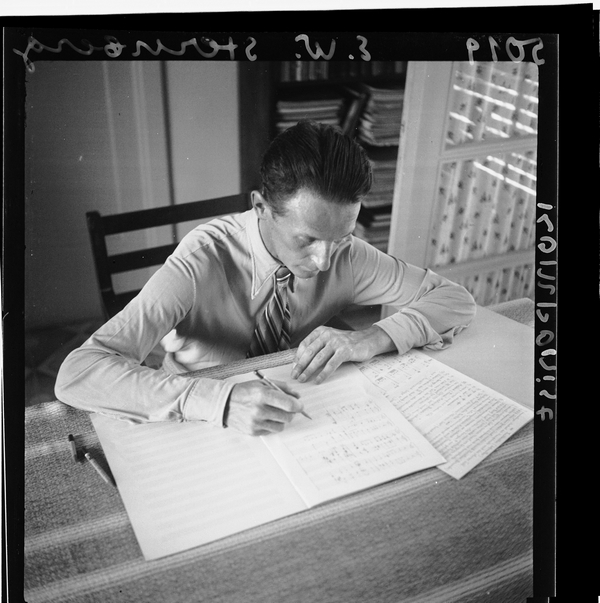
Erich Sternberg

Erich Walter Sternberg (Hebrew: אריך ולטר שטרנברג; May 31, 1891, in Berlin – December 15, 1974, in Tel Aviv) was a German-born Israeli composer. He was one of the founders of the Israel Philharmonic Orchestra.

== Biography ==
After graduating with a law degree from Kiel University in 1918, Sternberg began studying composition with Hugo Leichtentritt and piano with H. Praetorius in Berlin. From 1925 Sternberg visited Palestine annually and moved there in 1932, along with other Jewish musicians who fled Germany prior to World War II. His life was devoted to composition and teaching of composition. In 1936 he helped Bronisław Huberman found the Israel Philharmonic Orchestra and promoted the Palestine chapter of the International Society for Contemporary Music. Sternberg married Frieda Pinner (Berlin, 1918), Ilse Tanja Wellhöner (Tel Aviv, 1936), Ella Thal (Tel-Aviv, 1949).

== Music career ==
Sternberg's works in the 1920s and 1930s were expressionistic in style and reflect the influences of Hindemith and Schoenberg. He also incorporated traditional Jewish musical idioms into his use of dense polyphonic textures. Examples of this can be seen in his salient use of the augmented 2nd and cantillation motifs in the piano cycle Visions from the East, a programmatic work concerning the Jews of Eastern Europe, and in his String Quartet no.1, where he quotes both a Yiddish song, Bei a teich (‘The River’), and the formula for the prayer Shema Yisrael.

In Berlin, Sternberg received praise for his compositions and many of his pieces were performed by leading ensembles and performers in that city. His String Quartet no.2 was performed by the Amar Quartet and Yishtabakh (‘Praise Ye’) by the Berlin Philharmonic. In 1929 he composed Yishtabakh, a work for Baritone soloist, SATB chorus, and chamber orchestra. The work was awarded the Engel Prize in 1946; an award Sternberg earned again in 1960.

Sternberg found it difficult to overcome the trauma of displacement from his German heritage and never felt entirely comfortable in Israel. He was never offered a permanent position at the Palestine Conservatory or the Hebrew University of Jerusalem, although he occasionally taught there as a guest lecturer.

In Palestine, Sternberg's compositional expression returned to nostalgic Romanticism in his large-scale orchestral works while simultaneously preserving a more modern harmonic vocabulary in his piano and chamber music compositions. For example, his symphonic variations Shneim-Asar Shivtei Yisrael (‘The Twelve Tribes of Israel’, 1938), reflects the powerful rhetoric of late Romanticism with obvious influences from Brahms, Max Reger and Richard Strauss. The work was the first large-scale orchestral composition written in Palestine.

His Capriccio for piano, a concise illustration of his style, displays a contrapuntal elaboration of two brief motifs in sonata-rondo form, with the movement's harmonic orientation stated by the two opening chords. However, even in his more radical chamber and piano works Sternberg never abandoned tonal orientation.

Sternberg was critical of music critics and composers like Marc Lavry who believed that music should be communicative and thus relatively simple and comprehensible; musical compositions, he argued, should be dominated by melodies however complex. In an article published in Musica hebraica in 1938, Sternberg wrote that the composer should "go his own way and speak his own language from within, with high professional standards as his only goal". This advocacy for an individual style stood at odds with many of his colleagues' quest for a distinctly national style. As a result, Sternberg's works do not reflect the simplicity of musical compositions in Palestine in the 1930s and 1940s. For example, his large-scale set of symphonic variations Yosef ve′Ehav (‘Joseph and his Brethren’, 1939) are dominated by strict contrapuntal devices which include complex fugues.

After 1940, Sternberg frequently turned back to earlier scores, revising many and using material from others for new compositions. Memorable works from the 1940s and 1950s are his vocal music works. Although he composed and arranged many Israeli folk songs, his treatment of the folk idiom reveals the strong influence of Fritz Jöde's choral project and of the Gebrauchsmusik of Hindemith rather than that of the predominating folk ideology of searching for inspiration in Arabic and Mediterranean songs. For example, Sternberg's arrangement of Hora kuma (‘Rise up, Brother’) by Shalom Postolsky is a set of six variations for seven-part chorus displaying contrapuntal and canonic textures, while his choral song Ima Adama (‘Mother Earth’) features richly chromatic and modal harmony.

Sternberg's compositional output includes 2 string quartets, 6 orchestral works, several works for piano, works for chorus and orchestra, works for solo singer and orchestra, and numerous songs and folksong arrangements. He also wrote incidental music for the play Amcha (Your People) by S. Aleichem in 1936 and two operas, Dr. Doolittle (1939 Jerusalem) and Pacificia, the Friendly Island (1974). Most of his compositions are part of the collection at the Archives of Israeli Music at Tel Aviv University.

== Awards and recognition ==
In 1971 Sternberg received the high order of merit from the President of the German Federal Republic.

== See also ==
- Music of Israel
