= Hugo Leichtentritt =

German-Jewish musicologist and composer

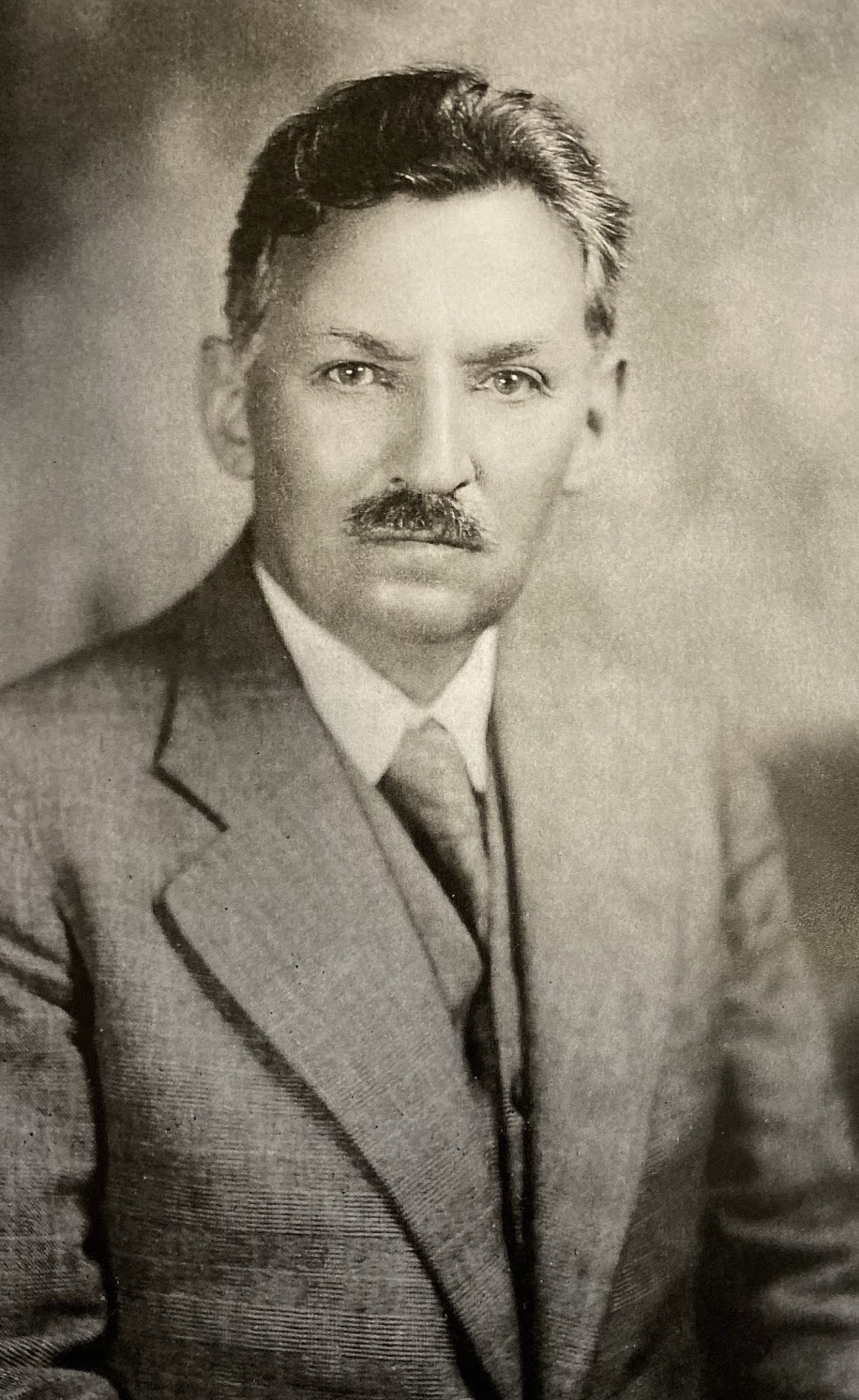
- Born: January 1, 1874; Pleschen, German Empire
- Died: November 13, 1951
- Occupation: Musicologist

Hugo Leichtentritt (1 January 1874, Pleschen, Polish: Pleszew, nearby Posen, Province of Posen – 13 November 1951, Cambridge, Massachusetts) was a German-Jewish musicologist and composer who spent much of his life in the USA. His pupils include composers Leroy Robertson and Erich Walter Sternberg.

== Early life ==
Leichtentritt was born to a family of Jewish merchants in Pleschen, German Empire. His German father, Gerson Leichtentritt, was a successful distillery owner. His mother, Frances Caroline Wax, was from Boston, Massachusetts. His great-uncle, Hirsch Leichtentritt, had a high social rank among local nobility, and was responsible for the small Leichtentritt family fortune.

Leichtentritt was head of his class in grammar school, and his family decided to enroll him in secondary school in the United States after financial troubles.

In 1889, Gerson Leichtentritt lost most of the family fortune. Hugo Leichtentritt's maternal grandfather convinced his family to emigrate to the United States. That November, they arrived in New York on the S.S. Auguste Victoria.

== Education ==
Leichtentritt briefly attended secondary school in Somerville, Massachusetts, before attending Harvard University.

At age 16, Leichtentritt attended Harvard from 1890 - 1894. There, he studied under John Knowles Paine in the Harvard Music Department.

After graduating from Harvard, Leichtentritt studied in Paris (1894–5) and then at the Hochschule für Musik in Berlin (1895–8), where he was taught by Joseph Joachim. After, he studied music history at Berlin University (1898–1901). There, he completed his doctorate in 1901, writing a dissertation on the operas of Reinhard Keiser.

== Post-Grad Life In Germany ==
After leaving Berlin University, Leichtentritt lectured in composition and music history at the Klindworth-Scharwenka Conservatory (1901–24). He simultaneously he taught composition on his own in Berlin and worked for several music journals, including the Allgemeine musikalische Zeitung, Die Musik, Signale für die musikalische Welt and the Vossische Zeitung. He also was the German correspondent of the Musical Courier and The Musical Times.

Leichtentritt mainly focused on musicology, producing many articles and books ranging from history and form to Chopin. Prior to the economic fallout of World War I, Berlin was becoming a beacon for the arts. In a diary entry in 1897, he "heard seventy-five concerts, given mostly by world famous artists and organizations, and twenty-four operas, some of them given two or three times," to which "half a dozen ballets must be added" (Autobiography p. 121).

Leichtentritt was filled with German patriotism, and wrote a Quintet for Piano and Strings, with a Finale "full of the enthusiasm that filled almost everybody in Germany during the first months of the war. We all had a fervent love for Germany and were proud of our fatherland" (Autobiography p. 338).

After the war, Leichtentritt wrote an article in the Vossische Zeitung calling on "the German nation to use one of its most precious treasures, unharmed by the war — the incomparably great German music — as a means of moral and spiritual reconstruction." The article, Leichtentritt proudly reports, "even in the first months of the Hitler rule, gained for me an exceptional position among my Jewish colleagues and earned the personal respect of my National Socialist colleagues" (Autobiography p. 173).

=== Departure From Germany ===
Wary of growing antisemitism in Germany, Leichtentritt sent his resume to Harvard, Columbia, Juilliard, Curtis, and Chicago College of Music. Only Columbia and Harvard responded, and only Harvard offered him a position as a lecturer, using departmental funds to pay his salary (Autobiography p. 397). He left Germany in 1933 before the main wave of emigration, and took with him more than twenty chests of books, a Steinway grand piano, and his savings, about $250 — roughly equivalent to $4,800 in modern USD (Autobiography p. 398). He then traveled to New York on the S.S. Veendam (Autobiography p. 399).

== Teaching At Harvard University ==
As a lecturer at Harvard, Leichtentritt tried to establish musicology as a legitimate field of study, but general disinterest and his strong emotions prevented a successful implementation into the Harvard curriculum. Instead, Leichtentritt taught classes on 17th and 18th century opera.

Leichtentritt was a thesis reader for Leonard Bernstein. Bernstein had cited Leichtentritt in his reasons to attend Harvard, writing, "I would probably attempt a Harvard training because of the superb musical department there. Several German professors, such as Leichtentritt, who have left their native land for obvious reasons, are now giving instruction there.” However, Leichtentritt was displeased with Bernstein's senior thesis, writing of its "arrogant attitude and air of superiority."

With his retirement looming, Leichtentritt branched out into other musical-related endeavors. He edited Oscar Thompson's The International Cyclopedia of Music and Musicians (New York, 1939), wrote for The Musical Quarterly, and had four books published by the Harvard University Press.

In 1940, a committee of Harvard professors invited fugitives of Nazi Germany to write about their experiences under the Nazi regime. Leichtentritt started to write about his own accounts, but the result turned into an autobiography.

== Retirement ==
1940: At the retirement age of 65, and without a stable position or income, Leichtentritt left the public eye, carrying out his scholarly work in Cambridge "at home, sustained by an innate optimism" (p. 514). He would occasionally lecture at Radcliffe College and New York University (1940–44).

== Death ==
Hugo Leichtentritt died in Cambridge, Massachusetts in 1951 at age 77. Upon his death, the University of Utah purchased his personal library, and his personal manuscripts and papers went to the Library of Congress. At the University of Utah, his student Leroy Robertson transferred his papers to the Harvard Musical Association, which published his autobiography.

== Musicologist ==
Leichtentritt was a dedicated and intense musicologist. For his huge piece of writing Geschichte der Motette (1908), he analysed over 600 motets in manuscripts. His writings on Handel (1924) discuss a wide range of Handel's works, including unperformed operas and oratorios. Geschichte der Musik (1909) summarized the history of Western music in an easy and approachable manner. Edward Dent called his Ferruccio Busoni (1916), "a useful outline and a concise guide to his works".

Two of Leichtentritt's works were more famous than any of his others: Music, History, and Ideas (1938) and Music of the Western Nations (1956). Music, History, and Ideas, which drew from his time lecturing at Harvard, analyzes music as a category of culture, comparing it to other arts, politics, philosophy, and religion. Music of the Western Nations connects music to the culture and sociopolitical climate of Western countries.

=== Works ===
Dates provided are primarily publication dates, not dates of authorship.

- R. Keiser in seinen Opern, 1901
- contributor of "Allgemeine Musikzeitung"
- contributor to "Die Musik"
- Geschichte der Motette, published 1908 by Breitkopf und Härtel
- Claudio Monteverdi als Madrigal Komponist, 1908-9
- Musikalische Formenlehre, 1911
- Erwin Lendvai: Kompositionen, 1912
- Ferruccio Busoni (1916)
- German Music of the Last Decade, Musical Quarterly 10/2 (1924): 193-218
- Music, History and Ideas, 1938
- Serge Koussevitzky; The Boston Symphony Orchestra and the New American Music, published 1946 by Harvard University Press
- Music of Western Nations, 1956

=== Essays ===
- Ein Urahne des Berliozschen Requiem. In: Allgemeine Musikzeitung. 30, 1903, S. 677–681.
- Über Pflege alter Vokalmusik. In: Zeitschrift der internationalen Musikgesellschaft. 6, 1904/05, S. 192–202.
- Aufführungen älterer Musik in Berlin. In: Zeitschrift der internationalen Musikgesellschaft. 7, 1905/06, S. 368–372.
- Was lehren uns die Bildwerke des 14.–17. Jh. über die Instrumentalmusik ihrer Zeit? In: Sammelbände der Internationalen Musikgesellschaft. 7, 1906, S. 604–622.
- The Renaissance Attitude toward Music. In: Musical Quarterly. 1, 1915, S. 604–622.
- Die Quellen des Neuen in der Musik. In: Melos. 1, 1920, S. 28–33.
- Nationalism and Internationalism in Music. In: Sackbut. 2, 1921/22, Heft 12, S. 13–16.
- Philipp Jarnach. In: Musikblätter des Anbruch. 5, 1923, S. 258–262.
- Das Händelsche Opernwerk. In: Die Musik. 16, 1923/24, S. 551–557.
- German Music of the Last Decade. In: The Musical Quarterly. 10, 1924, S. 193–218.
- Harmonic Daring in the 16th Century. In: Modern Music. 5, 1927/28, Heft 1, S. 12–21.
- Schönberg and Tonality. In: Modern Music. 5, 1927/28, Heft 4, S. 3–10.
- Schubert’s early operas. In: The Musical Quarterly. 14, 1928, S. 620–638.
- Arnold Schönbergs op. 19. In: Die Musik 25, 1932/33, S. 405–412.
- Bartok and the Hungarian Folk-Song. In: Modern Music. 10, 1932/33, S. 130–139.
- Handel’s Harmonic Art. In: The Musical Quarterly. 21, 1935, S. 208–223.
- On Editing Netherlands Music. In: Musical Mercury 2, 1935, S. 5–11.
- On the Prologue in Early Opera. In: Papers of the American Musicological Society. 1936, S. 88–95.
- The Reform of Trent and Its Effect on Music. In: The Musical Quarterly. 30, 1944, S. 319–328.

== Composer ==
Although Leichtentritt was primarily known as a musicologist, he was both an avid composer and composition teacher. His works include a comic opera Die Sizilianer (1920), concertos, song cycles, piano and chamber music, and a symphony. His pieces enjoyed a measure of success in Germany, although many cannot be found. He was a good friend of Ferruccio Busoni and Max Reger.

=== Works ===
String Quartet, Opus 1

=== List of Pupils ===
Leichtentritt had numerous pupils during his time teaching in Berlin and at Harvard.

- Leroy Robertson
- Erich Walter Sternberg
- Harold Spivacke
- Salvador Ley
- William Busch
- Arthur Berger

== Reception ==
Leichtentritt's History of the Motet (1908) and his Musical Form Theory (1911) were considered standard works in Europe. In the United States, Leichtentritt hoped to continue the success he had in Germany as a valued music critic and composer. He had some, but little work as a music critic, and his strong opinions and emotions hurt his reputation as a musicologist. Leichtentritt's attempts to publish English translations of his well-known German books, the two volumes of the History of the Motet and his Musical Form Theory, failed initially. His compositions saw similar failures, failing to gain acceptance and greatly disappointing him. Famous conductors, he complained, ignored his music because his compositions were "too little sensational for their needs" (Autobiography p. 514).
