= Franzpeter Goebels =

German classical pianist (1920–1988)

Franzpeter Goebels (5 March 1920 – 28 September 1988) was a German pianist, harpsichordist and music educator.

== Life and career ==
Goebels was born in Mülheim an der Ruhr, the son of a church musician. He received piano lessons, and then studied piano and harpsichord at the Musikhochschule Köln with teachers including Karl Hermann Pillney. He also studied musicology, Romance studies and philosophy at the University of Cologne. He was a solo pianist with the Deutschlandsender broadcaster from 1940, and studied piano further with Raoul von Koczalski. He was drafted for military service in 1942, but due to an injury he was soon transferred to Prague where he led a symphony orchestra of the Wehrmacht. He finally became a prisoner of war.

From 1947, Goebels taught piano at the Robert-Schumann-Konservatorium in Düsseldorf. In 1958, he was appointed professor for piano and harpsichord at the Nordwestdeutsche Musikakademie Detmold where he taught until his retirement in 1982, as head of the seminary for music pedagogy, and as head of the Studio for Neue Musik there until 1972.

In 1964, Goebels was awarded the Ruhrpreis für Kunst und Wissenschaft. In addition to his pianistic and pedagogical activities, he also worked as a composer, arranger and editor of musical works.

Goebels was married to Gertrud since 1951; the couple had two children, one of them the pianist Friedwart Goebels, who lectures at the faculty for music therapy of the private SRH Hochschule Heidelberg. He died in Detmold at the age of 68.
