= Hermann Zilcher =

German composer, pianist, conductor, and music teacher

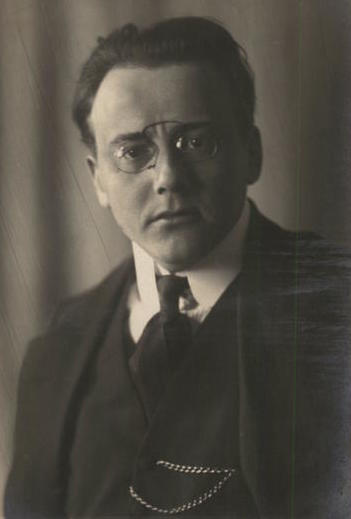
- Zilcher in 1919
- Born: 18 August 1881; Frankfurt am Main, German Empire
- Died: 1 January 1948 (aged 66); Würzburg, Germany
- Occupations: Composer, pianist, conductor and music teacher
- Website: www.hermann-zilcher.de

Hermann Zilcher (18 August 1881 – 1 January 1948) was a German composer, pianist and conductor, and also a music teacher. His compositional oeuvre includes orchestral and choral works, two operas, chamber music and songs, études, piano works, and numerous works for accordion.

As a music teacher, Zilcher also enjoyed an outstanding reputation. His students included, among others, Norbert Glanzberg, Karl Höller, Winfried Zillig, Kurt Eichhorn, Maria Landes-Hindemith, and Carl Orff.

After the seizure of power by the Nazis, Zilcher became a member of the party, a fact for which he would later be criticized.

== Early life and education ==
Zilcher received early piano lessons from his father, Paul Zilcher, who was known as a composer of didactic piano and chamber music.

He studied from 1897 at the Dr. Hoch Conservatory in Frankfurt, piano with James Kwast, counterpoint and morphology with Iwan Knorr, and composition with Bernhard Scholz. At graduation, he was awarded the Mozart Prize.

== Career ==
In 1901, Zilcher moved to Berlin, where he quickly established himself mainly as a pianist for singers and instrumentalists, with concert tours, which made him internationally known in the United States and in Europe. In 1905, he returned to Frankfurt as a piano teacher at the Dr. Hoch Conservatory. In 1908, he was appointed by Felix Mottl as a piano professor and in 1916 as a composition professor at the Academy of Music in Munich. In Munich, he worked closely with the head of the Munich Kammerspiele, Otto Falckenberg, for whom he wrote incidental music. In 1920, Zilcher became director of the Bavarian State Conservatory of Music in Würzburg and founded the Würzburg Mozart Festival in 1922, which soon became internationally famous. For these accomplishments, Zilcher was appointed in 1924 Privy Councillor by the Bavarian government and the University of Würzburg awarded him an honorary doctorate.

In the late 1920s, Zilcher founded the Würzburg Chamber Orchestra, which achieved nationwide renown. As a result, he became increasingly engaged as guest conductor of other orchestras; for example, he conducted the Berlin Philharmonic Orchestra, at the invitation of Wilhelm Furtwängler. At this time, Zilcher conducted works of Arnold Schoenberg, Ernst Krenek, and Paul Hindemith. In 1933, Hindemith joined in a concert in Würzburg under Zilcher conducting as a soloist of his viola concerto, Op. 36., as the pianist of the Zilcher Trio with violinist Adolf Schiering and cellist Ernst Chanbley. Zilcher performed works of Mendelssohn in 1932.

In 1941, his violin concerto, Op. 92. was premiered in a concert by the Berlin Philharmonic under the direction of Wilhelm Furtwängler. Due to a long-standing dispute, Zilcher was deprived of the management of the Mozart Festival and the directorship of the music school in 1943. In the final phase of World War II, Zilcher was approved to not serving on the front line, but was involved in the preparations for the Mozart Festival.

Zilcher, after an anonymous complaint, was deposed as director of the Würzburg Conservatory due to his activities in the Nazi era. The US military administration sentenced him to logging operations, where he injured his hands. Due to a medical certificate, he was exempted from this work. Zilcher composed a fifth symphony in 1947.

He had long suffered from a weak heart and died suddenly on 1 January 1948 at the age of 66 in Würzburg.

== Music and influences ==
Zilcher is counted among the traditionalists of the 20th century and stands somewhere between late Romanticism and Modernity. Alfred Einstein characterized Zilcher as follows: "one of the greatest German composers in the semi-Brahms tradition, with a neo-romantic and semi-impressionistic tonal direction." Musicologist Barbara Haas commented: "Hermann Zilcher [...] can be seen as a composer of the middle; between old and new; He was a composer of moderate modernism, whose musical language evolved from the music of the 19th century, which was enriched with original personality traits. These personality traits are reflected in a tendency to simplicity and clarity of form, in a tendency to elaborate polyphony as well, and, especially in his late work - to monothematic concentration and uniform sentiment." There is also a preference for the "Volkston" (in the style of folk music), similar to his models of Schumann and Brahms, but which is also to be found in more modern composers like Bartok or Hindemith.

Zilcher had special success in his lifetime with the oratorio Die Liebesmesse ("The Love Fair") premiere 1913 in Strasbourg, France, with his "Deutschen Volksliederspiel" for four mixed voices and piano in 1915, and with the première of his violin concerto No. 2 in 1942 by Furtwängler and the Berlin Philharmonic. In addition to the posthumous premiere of his last symphony. 5 the led by Eugen Jochum (... "und dennoch ...) which was well received in Hamburg in 1948. In Germany, his works were rarely performed until the 1990s. Zilcher music again regained broader interest, with CD releases, and an increasing number of performances.

== Personal life ==
Zilcher was the father of actress Eva Zilcher and conductor Heinz Reinhart Zilcher.

== Selected works ==
Stage

- Fitzebutze, Traumspiel in 5 acts by Richard Dehmel, Op. 19
- Wie es euch gefällt (As You Like It), Incidental Music, Op. 33; for the play by William Shakespeare
- Das Wintermärchen (The Winter's Tale), Incidental Music for small orchestra, Op. 39; for the play by William Shakespeare
- Doktor Eisenbart, Comic Opera in 3 acts after Otto Falckenberg (libretto by Hermann Wolfgang von Waltershausen), Op. 45 (1920)
- Der Widerspenstigen Zähmung (The Taming of the Shrew), Incidental Music for 12 instruments or small orchestra, Op. 54 (1925); for the play by William Shakespeare
- Komödie der Irrungen (The Comedy of Errors) for 12 instruments (percussion) or small orchestra, Op. 73 (1935); for the play by William Shakespeare
- Palm, Incidental Music for small orchestra, Op. 79 (1935); for the play by Josef Wenter
- Ein Sommernachtstraum (A Midsummer Night's Dream), Incidental Music, Op. 93 (1940); for the play by William Shakespeare

Orchestral

- Variationen (Variations) in B minor (1898)
- Sinfonietta in E major for string orchestra, Op. 1 (1900)
- Suite in G major, Op. 4 (1903)
- Symphony No. 1 in A Major, op. 17 (1906)
- Symphony No. 2 in F minor, Op. 23 (1908–1909)
- An mein deutsches Land, Overture for orchestra and chorus ad libitum, Op. 48
- Tanz-Fantasie (Dance Fantasy), Op. 71 (1933)
- Musica buffa, 10 Intermezzi for 12 instruments (percussion) or small orchestra, Op. 73a (1935); extracted from the incidental music for Komödie der Irrungen
- Rameau-Suite for small orchestra, Op. 76 (1934); also for violin, cello and piano
- Heinkel-Marsch, Op. 83 (1936)
- Symphony No. 4 in F♯ minor, Op. 84
- Symphony No. 5 "...und dennoch!..." in C minor, Op. 112 (1947)

Concertante

- Concerto in D minor for 2 violins and orchestra, Op. 9
- Concerto No. 1 in B minor for violin and small orchestra, Op. 11
- Suite in vier Sätzen (Suite in Four Movements) in G major for 2 violins and small orchestra, Op. 15
- Skizzen aus dem Orient (Sketches from the Orient) for violin and chamber orchestra, Op. 18 (1906)
- Concerto in B minor for piano and orchestra, Op. 20 (1906)
- Konzertstück in einem Satze (Concert Piece in One Movement) in A minor for cello and orchestra, Op. 21 (1904)
- Klage, Konzertstück in F♯ minor for violin and small orchestra, Op. 22 (1908)
- Nacht und Morgen for 2 pianos, timpani and string orchestra, Op. 24 (1909)
- Konzertstück über ein Thema von W. A. Mozart in D major for flute and small orchestra, Op. 81 (1936)
- Concerto No. 2 in A major for violin and orchestra, Op. 92 (1942)
- Variationen über ein Thema von W. A. Mozart for cello and small orchestra, Op. 95
- Bayerische Suite (Bavarian Suite) for accordion and orchestra, Op. 98
- Kammerkonzert in F major for piano and orchestra (13 instruments), Op. 102 (1945)

Chamber music

- 4 Weihnachtsstücke (4 Christmas Pieces) for violin and piano (1892)
- 3 Stücke (3 Pieces) for violin and piano (1894)
- Phantasie-Sonate for violin and piano (1895)
- Piano Trio (1896)
- Sonata in A major for violin and piano (1898)
- Quintet in F♯ minor for oboe, clarinet, horn, bassoon and piano, Op. Juv. 30 (1899); also for stringed instruments
- String Quartet in C minor (1900)
- 2 Stücke (2 Pieces) for violin and piano, Op. 3
- 2 Stücke (2 Pieces) for 2 violins, Op. 7
- Sonata in D major for violin and piano, Op. 16
- Idyllen (Idylls) for violin, cello (or viola) and piano, Op. 17
- Ein Gedenkblatt for violin, cello (or viola) and piano, Op. 18
- Piano Quintet in C♯ minor, Op. 42 (1918)
- Winterlandschaft (Winter Landscape) for cello and piano, Op. 53
- Piano Trio in E minor, Op. 56 (1926)
- Schmerzliches adagio for clarinet and piano, Op. 49
- Rameau-Suite, Op. 76 (1934); also for small orchestra
- Suite in G major for string quartet, Op. 77
- Kleine Serenade (Little Serenade) for oboe, clarinet, horn and viola, Op. 80 (1935)
- Duet for violin and cello, Op. 89
- Trio in Form von Variationen in A minor for clarinet, cello and piano, Op. 90 (1938)
- Bläserquintett "Vier Jahreszeiten" (Woodwind Quintet "The Four Seasons") in A major for flute, oboe, clarinet, horn and bassoon, Op. 91 (1941)
- Variationen über ein Thema von Mozart for violin and accordion, Op. 94; theme from Divertimento No. 2, K. 131 (1772)
- Variationen über ein fränkisches Volkslied for violin and accordion, Op. 97
- Variationen über ein Thema von Schubert for violin and accordion, Op. 99
- Variationen über ein Thema von Mozart for clarinet, cello (or viola) and piano, Op. 101
- String Quartet in C minor, Op. 104 (1945)
- Haus-Musik, 3 Pieces for violin or flute, accordion and piano, Op. 110 (1946)

Accordion

- 3 Stücke, Op. 82

1. Abendstimmung
2. Jahrmarktsbilder
3. Harmoniker-Marsch

- Ländliche Musiken (Music on the Green), 3 Pieces for accordion orchestra, Op. 88a
- Aus meiner Ferienmappe, 5 Pieces, Op. 88b

Tanz auf der Wiese
Wächterlied

- Amselmelodien, Op. 98a
- Kleine Übungs- und Vortragsstücke, Op. 103
- Schüler und Lehrer, 5 Duets for 2 accordions, Op. 106 (1946)

Piano

- 4 Humoresken, Op. 5 (1903)
- 4 Clavierstücke (4 Piano Pieces), Op. 6
- 6 kleine Stücke (4 Little Pieces) for piano 4-hands, Op. 8 (1902)
- 7 Skizzen (7 Sketches), Op. 26 (1911)
- Bilderbuch, 9 Klangstudien (9 Sound Studies), Op. 34 (1916)
- Symphony No. 3 in A major for 2 pianos, Op. 50 (1923)
- Winterbilder (Winter Scenes), 5 Short Pieces, Op. 57 (c.1926)
- Klänge der Nacht (Night-Sounds), 6 Pieces, Op. 58 (1927)
- Drei Weihnachtsstücke (3 Christmas Pieces), Op. 61
- Vier leichte Stücke (4 Easy Pieces) for piano 4-hands

Vocal

- 5 Lieder (5 Songs) for medium voice and piano, Op. 10
- 4 Lieder (4 Songs) for high voice and piano, Op. 12
- 4 Lieder (4 Songs) for medium voice and piano, Op. 13
- 4 Lieder (4 Songs) for low voice and piano, Op. 14
- Dehmel-Zyklus, 14 Poems from Erlösungen, Weib und Welt and Aber die Liebe, for soprano, tenor and piano, Op. 25 (1919); words by Richard Dehmel
- Hölderlin, Symphonic Cycle for tenor (or baritone) and orchestra, Op. 28 (1912–1913)
- 4 Kriegslieder for voice and piano, Op. 30 (1914)
- Deutsches Volksliederspiel, 16 Folk Songs for 4 voices and piano, Op. 32 (1915)
- Ein Tanz Lied for coloratura soprano, violin and piano, Op. 36
- 15 kleine Lieder nach den Hey-Speckter'schen Fabeln for voice and piano, Op. 37
- Aus dem Hohelied Salomonis, Variations for 2 voices (alto, baritone), string quartet and piano, Op. 38 (c.1918)
- 4 Lieder (4 Songs) for voice and piano, Op. 40
- 3 Gedichte von Richard Dehmel (3 Poems of Richard Dehmel) for voice and piano, Op. 41; words by Richard Dehmel
- Die Natur: Hymnus von Goethe for medium voice and piano, Op. 47 (1922); words by Johann Wolfgang von Goethe
- Goethe-Lieder for voice and piano, Op. 51 (1923); words by Johann Wolfgang von Goethe
- Marienlieder, Cycle of 11 songs for high voice and string quartet, Op. 52
- 3 Gedichte von Goethe for high voice and orchestra, Op. 59 (c.1926); words by Johann Wolfgang von Goethe
- Eichendorff-Zyklus for voice and piano, Op. 60 (1927); words by Joseph von Eichendorff
- Rokoko-Suite for high voice, violin, cello and piano, Op. 65
- Fantasie for high voice, piano and orchestra, Op. 66 (1931); words from Trilogie der Leidenschaft by Johann Wolfgang von Goethe
- 2 Gedichte for high voice, flute, trombone and small orchestra, Op. 78

Choral

- Die Liebesmesse in 3 parts for soloists, chorus and orchestra, Op. 27 (1911–1913)

1. Mann und Weib
2. Gott
3. Die Welt

- Chiemsee-Terzette for 3 female voices (solo or chorus), Op. 46
- Lied des Schülers for school chorus, violin, harmonium and piano 4-hands, Op. 55 (1925)
- 2 Gedichte von Goethe for male chorus and orchestra, Op. 62 (1927–1928)
- Töne Lied, aus weiter Ferne..., 4 Poems for male chorus and string orchestra ad libitum, Op. 68 (1931); words by Johann Wolfgang von Goethe
- Deutscher Glaube, Hymn for mixed chorus and orchestra, Op. 69 (1931)
- Gebet der Jugend, Hymn for soprano, mixed chorus, children's chorus and orchestra, Op. 75 (1934); words by Karl Maria Kaufmann
- An die Künstler for soprano, male chorus and orchestra, Op. 86 (1938); words by Friedrich Schiller
- Vater unser for soprano, baritone, mixed chorus, organ and orchestra, Op. 87 (1938); words by Friedrich Gottlieb Klopstock

== Literature ==
- Barbara Haas, Komponisten in Bayern (1999), ISBN 978-3-7952-0992-6
- Barbara Haas andothers;a. Hermann Zilcher (Monographie mit zahlreichen Notenbeispielen und Fotos), Verlag Dr. Hans Schneider, Tutzing 1999 ISBN 978-3-7952-0992-6.
- Michael Klubertanz: Hermann Zilcher in MGG, Kassel 2006.
- Matthias Wagner: Geheimrat Professor Dr. h. c. Hermann Zilcher. Aspekte seiner Würzburger Jahre im Spiegel neuer Aktenfunde, in Mainfränkisches Jahrbuch für Geschichte und Kunst, Band 50, S. 114–135, Würzburg 1998.
- Hermann Zilcher – Ein Leben für die Musik, Ausstellungskatalog der Bayerischen Staatsbibliothek 1981.
- Theodor Hlouschek: Hermann Zilcher, sein Leben, sein Werk, Weimar 1952.
- Hans Schneider: Hermann Zilcher 1881–1948. Heiteres aus einem Würzburger Künstlerleben. Erlebt, gesammelt und niedergeschrieben von Hans Schneider. Ein Liebhaberdruck aus dem Echterhaus, Würzburg 1980.
- Peter Cahn: Das Hoch'sche Konservatorium in Frankfurt am Main 1878–1978 Frankfurt/M. 1979.
- Hans Oppenheim: Hermann Zilcher, sein Leben, sein Werk. In: Zeitgenössische Komponisten, München 1921.
- Alfred Einstein: Artikel Hermann Zilcher. In: Das neue Musik-Lexikon, Berlin 1926 S. 726.
