= Leroy Robertson =

American composer and music educator

Leroy Robertson (December 21, 1896 – July 25, 1971) was an American composer and music educator.

Robertson was born in Fountain Green, Utah. One of his earliest instructors was Anthony C. Lund. He graduated from the New England Conservatory of Music with a certificate in public school music and diplomas in composition, violin (after studies with Harrison Keller), and piano in 1923, the same year he was awarded the Endicott prize for "Overture in E Minor". Following his graduation, Robertson taught music at North Cache High School in Richmond, Utah and at Pleasant Grove High School in Pleasant Grove, Utah, where he also supervised music in the Alpine School District.

Robertson was appointed to the music faculty at Brigham Young University in 1925. He soon became professor and chairman of the music department, a position he held until 1948. In 1930, Robertson studied with Ernest Bloch at the San Francisco Conservatory of Music. He would continue his studies with Bloch in Roveredo Capriasca, Switzerland in 1932, and with Hugo Leichtentritt in Berlin, Germany, in 1933. Robertson received a BA degree and an MA degree from Brigham Young University in June 1933.

Between 1933 and 1945, Robertson composed several works for piano and organ, as well as strings, including his "Songs from the Shadow", "Fantasia for the Organ", "String Quartet", and "Punch and Judy Overture". It was also during this period that he began work on the "Oratorio from the Book of Mormon". In 1945, Robertson was awarded the Utah Institute of Fine Arts Award for "Rhapsody for Piano and Orchestra". Robertson won the Reichhold Award of $25,000 for "Trilogy for Orchestra" in 1947, which was premiered by the Detroit Symphony Orchestra with Karl Krueger conducting. The following year, he was appointed professor and chairman of the music department at the University of Utah, a position he held until 1962. Robertson's "Concerto for Violin and Orchestra" premiered under Maurice Abravanel during the centennial of the University of Utah in 1950 with Utah Symphony Orchestra's concertmaster Tibor Zelig as soloist. In 1954, he received his Ph.D. from the University of Southern California.

Robertson was instrumental in the promotion of the Utah Symphony and of classical music in Salt Lake City.

He is best known for his Oratorio from the Book of Mormon, which premiered in 1953. The setting of the Lord's Prayer from that oratorio was recorded by the Mormon Tabernacle Choir and released as a 45 single on the flip side of the Battle Hymn of the Republic, which hit the top 50 charts.

Among Robertson's works in the 1948 hymnal of the Church of Jesus Christ of Latter-day Saints was the music for "Up! Arouse Thee, O Beautiful Zion", with words by Emily H. Woodmansee. The 1985 edition of the Church's hymnal includes eight of Robertson's hymns, including "On This Day of Joy and Gladness" (hymn #64, both words and music by Robertson), "Let Earth's Inhabitants Rejoice" (hymn #53), ""Great King of Heaven" (hymn #63), "God of Our Fathers, Known of Old" (hymn #80), "I'm A Pilgrim, I'm A Stranger" (hymn #121), "Upon The Cross Of Calvary" (hymn #184), "We Love Thy House, Oh God" (hymn #247) and "Go Ye Messengers of Glory" (hymn #262).

== Selected works ==
- 1923 Endicott Overture
- 1936 Quintet in A Minor for Piano and String Quartet
- 1940 Prelude, Scherzo and Ricercare for orchestra
- 1940 String Quartet
- 1944 Rhapsody for piano and orchestra
- 1945 Punch and Judy Overture
- 1947 Trilogy, for orchestra
- 1948 Violin Concerto
- 1953 The Book Of Mormon, oratorio
- 1957 American Serenade, for string quartet
- 1966 Piano Concerto

also

- Cello Concerto
- Fantasia for organ
- Come, Come, Ye Saints, for chorus
- Hatikva, for chorus
- From The Crossroads, for chorus
- The Lord's Prayer, for chorus
- Passacaglia for orchestra
- All Creatures of Our God and King, motet
