= Kurt Eichhorn =

German conductor

Kurt Peter Eichhorn (4 August 1908 – 29 June 1994), was a German conductor.

Eichhorn was born in Munich, the son of a painter. He studied music at the conservatory in Würzburg with Hermann Zilcher and progressed through provincial houses. His conducting debut was in 1932 as a conductor and choral conductor in Bielefeld. He also worked as a conductor in Teplitz-Schönau and Karlsbad. Hitler's annexation of the Sudetenland provided Eichhorn with career openings in Teplice (1939) and Karlovy Vary (1941–1943). He began conducting at the far more significant Dresden State Opera in 1941, and was a conductor of the Dresden Philharmonic in 1944.

The postwar years found him back in his hometown of Munich. From 1945, he directed the Munich Philharmonic Orchestra, the Bavarian People's Opera, and taught conducting at the Munich Academy of Music. From 1956 to 1967, he was chief conductor of the State Theatre at the Gärtnerplatz in Munich. He was chief conductor of the Munich Radio Orchestra from 1967 to 1975. He was appointed honorary conductor of the Bruckner Orchestra in Linz, with which he began a recording cycle of the symphonies of Anton Bruckner, but this project remained unfinished when he died at Murnau. He was noted for his recordings of the music of Carl Orff. In 1991, the Bruckner Association of Upper Austria awarded him the Gold Plaque.

Cultural offices
| Preceded by Werner Schmidt-Boelcke | Chief Conductor, Münchner Rundfunkorchester; 1967–1975 | Succeeded by Heinz Wallberg |
