= Karl Hermann Pillney =

Austrian pianist

Karl Hermann Pillney (8 April 1896 – 10 April 1980) was an Austrian composer and concert pianist.

== Life ==
Born in Graz, Pillney, son of a harpist and chamber musician, attended the Oberrealschule. After the Abitur in 1915, he went to the Konservatorium in Köln, where he studied with Hermann Abendroth among others. In 1923 he passed his concert exam as a concert pianist.

Pillney undertook concert tours in Europe and overseas. In 1925 he received an appointment at the Rheinische Musikschule in Cologne. From 1930 he was a concert pianist, head of a master class for piano playing and from 1940, professor at the Hochschule für Musik und Tanz Köln.

In November 1931, Pillney was attacked by the NS-press because of his musical time play Von Freitag bis Donnerstag. After the "Machtergreifung" by the Nazis, Pillney was nevertheless accepted as a member of the NSDAP on 1 April 1933 and registered under the number 1.785.769, but was excluded again from 1934 to 1937.

In the post-war period, he remained a university lecturer until 1951, but then worked as a freelance composer.

He considered the arrangement and publication of early music, especially Johann Sebastian Bach and other composers, to be his task.

Pillney's most successful work as a composer is the 1968 variation cycle for piano and orchestra Eskapaden eines Gassenhauers, in which he varies the hit Was machst Du mit dem Knie, lieber Hans in different classical styles.

Pillney died in Bergisch Gladbach at the age of 84.

== Works ==
- Arrangement of the Variationen und Fuge über ein Thema by Max Reger for piano and orchestra (premiere in Cologne, 1924)
- Arrangement of J. S. Bach's The Musical Offering
- Christus, Motets 1928
- Von Freitag bis Donnerstag, Operneinakter 1931
- Musik für Klavier und Orchester, 1932
- Completion of the final fugue of J. S. Bach's The Art of Fugue
- Cadence (Fugato) to the last movement of Mozart's Piano Concerto in D minor
- Eskapaden eines Gassenhauers, 1968

== Students ==
- Jürg Baur
- Egon Sarabèr, author of Methode und Praxis der Musikgestaltung, 2011
- Eckart Sellheim.

== Literature ==
- In dulci jubilo sechs alte Weihnachtslieder; für eine Singstimme, Flöte (Violine), Gambe (Bratsche), Violoncello und Cembalo (Klavier). (1986)
- Ingrid Marie-Theres Knierbein, Karl Hermann Pillney: Cembalist, Pianist, Komponist aus Bensberg; zum 100. Geburtstag am 8. April 1996, in Arbeitsgemeinschaft für Rheinische Musikgeschichte Mitteilungen 83 (1996) pp. 36–40
- Reinhold Wecker, Karl Hermann Pillney. Künstler, Komponist und Pädagoge. Contributions to the rheinischen Musikgeschichte Vol. 162, Merseburger: Kassel 2002
