= Maurits Frank =

Dutch cellist

Maurits Frank (29 July 1892 in Rotterdam – 3 March 1959 in Cologne) was a Dutch cellist and music educator.

The student of Pablo Casals taught in Heidelberg and Neustadt/Palatinate before he moved to the Hoch Conservatory in Frankfurt in 1915. During this time, he was the musical partner of Paul Hindemith in the Rebner Quartet and the Amar Quartet.

After the seizure of power by the Nazis, he had to leave Germany for racist reasons and went to the Netherlands. In 1949 he returned to Germany and taught cello and chamber music at the Hochschule für Musik und Tanz Köln. He continued to work as a chamber musician and devoted himself especially to contemporary music. Thus he played the world premiere of Hindemith's Cello Concerto in E flat and with Eduard Zuckmayer the world premiere of Anton Webern's Two Little Pieces. In 1957 he founded the Rheinisches Kammerorchester Köln. Under the title Tonleitern und Dreiklänge he published studies and exercises for the cello.

Since 1916 Frank was married to Luisa Juncker. He died at the age of 66 years in his apartment in Bayenthal.
