= Langerhans =

Langerhans may refer to:

- Paul Langerhans (1847–1888), German pathologist and biologist
  - Langerhans cells, dendritic cells abundant in the epidermis
  - Islets of Langerhans, the area in which the endocrine cells of the pancreas are grouped
- Ryan Langerhans (born 1980), American baseball player
