= Amar Quartet =

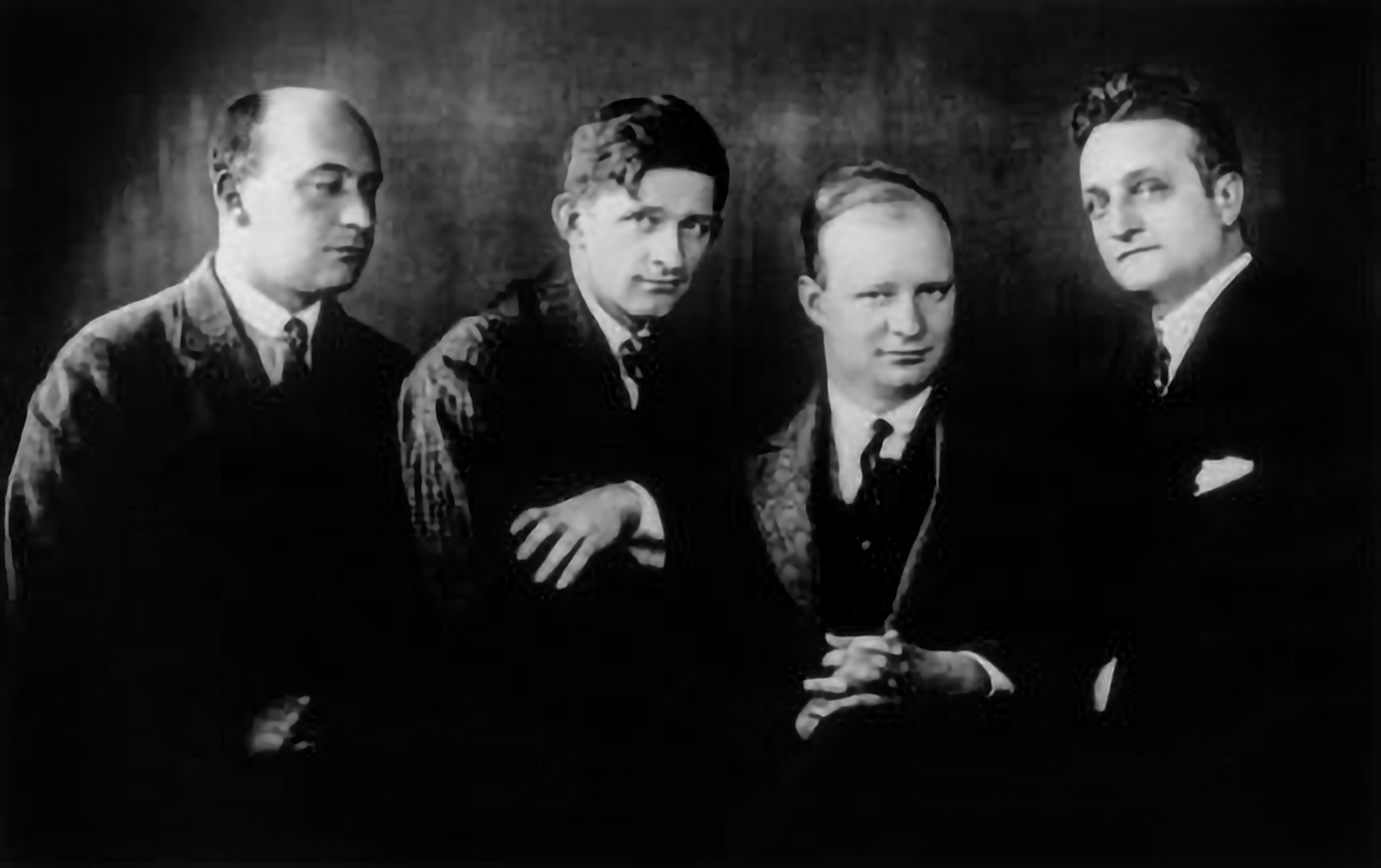
Amar Quartet (1925), from left to right: Licco Amar, Rudolf Hindemith, Paul Hindemith, Walter Caspar

The Amar Quartet, also known as the Amar-Hindemith Quartet, was a musical ensemble founded by the composer Paul Hindemith in 1921 in Germany. The quartet was active in both classical and modern repertoire until disbanding in 1933. It performed for many European concerts, broadcasts and recordings.

== Personnel ==
First violin

- Licco Amar (1921–1933)

Second violin

- Walter Caspar (1921–1933)

Viola

- Paul Hindemith (1921–1929)
- Erich Kraack (1929–1933)

Cello

- Rudolf Hindemith (1921)
- Maurits Frank (1922–1924)
- Rudolf Hindemith (1924–1927)
- Maurits Frank (1927–1933)

== Origins ==
From c. 1914 Paul Hindemith, a graduate of Hoch Conservatory at Frankfurt am Main, had taken the second violin desk in the Rebner Quartet of Frankfurt, led by his violin teacher Adolf Rebner. He continued to play in quartets during the war while in military service, and after the war took up the viola and asked to be moved to that desk. He had written string quartets in 1915 (Op. 2) and 1918 (Op. 10), and in 1920 produced another (Op. 16) which was accepted for performance in the new 1921 Donaueschingen Festival. However Gustav Havemann, leader of the Havemann Quartet engaged for it, refused to perform the work, and therefore Hindemith was obliged to form a group to give his own premiere. He chose his younger brother Rudolf (dedicatee of the work) as cellist, and recruited Licco Amar, a Budapest Conservatory graduate and 1915–1920 concertmaster of the Berlin Philharmonic Orchestra, and then of Mannheim National Theatre, as first violin and Walter Caspar as second.

The violinist Licco Amar remembered:

"Shortly before the holidays I [...] received a telegram from Donaueschingen from Heinrich Burkard, a music director completely unknown to me. He proposed that I participate at the upcoming music festival in Donaueschingen, the first of its kind, with another violinist [Walter Caspar] and perform the quartet of a composer utterly unknown to me named Paul Hindemith. I of course accepted with pleasure. Without knowing any further details, I went to the Black Forest during the holidays and received the score and parts of the [...] String Quartet, Op. 16. I would not claim that I understood this new kind of music from an initial reading of the score, but I remember very well that something special grabbed me from these notes: an energy and vitality that I grasped more instinctively than consciously. I was most astonished when I came to Donaueschingen as agreed and was received by two slight young people, who in fact looked like children, at the railway station. One was Paul Hindemith and the other was his brother Rudolf, who took on the cello part in this quartet. These two, who looked so slender, took possession of my baggage – I can still see this before me – and carried it away. [...] In eight days we had rehearsed this quartet very well, whereby both Hindemith brothers proved themselves outstanding quartet partners. The performance was – to put it briefly – a thunderous success."

The performance was duly given, and in 1922 the Quartet became permanent and began giving recitals, specialising in modern music, and was soon extremely busy. Rudolf Hindemith, who found working under his brother's authority irksome, left and was replaced by Maurits Frank; but Rudolf returned for a period during which the quartet's recordings were made and the London (BBC-sponsored) debut was given (December 1926). Soon afterwards he left again permanently and Frank returned as cellist. The personnel of the Quartet with Amar and Caspar as violinists and Paul Hindemith as violist remained unchanged until Hindemith's departure in April 1929. Erich Kraack became Hindemith's successor in 1929. The Quartet disbanded in 1933.

== Repertoire ==
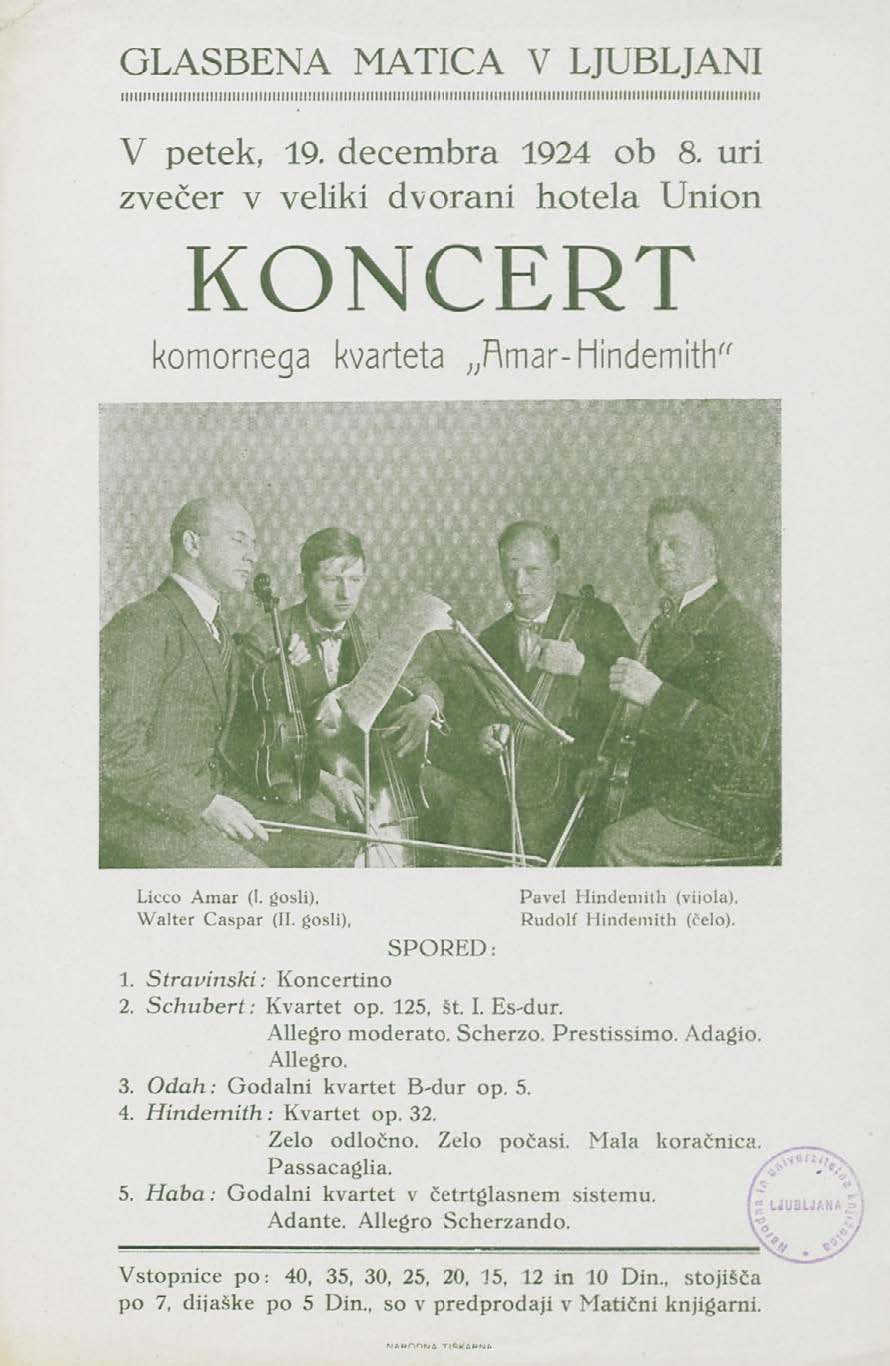
Amar Quartet Programme

The Amar Quartet performed about 500 concerts from 1921 until 1933. They played in the major German metropolises as well as in numerous provincial towns. With travels to Denmark, Austria, Italy, the Netherlands, Switzerland and Czechoslovakia, the Quartet became renowned beyond German borders as well. During the winters of 1927/28 and 1928/29, the Quartet undertook two extended concert tours to the Soviet Union, during which Hindemith was able to gain an impression of contemporary Russian music. He also encountered Dmitri Shostakovich at this time.

The Amar Quartet presented a varied repertoire at its concerts, including not only string quartets but also works for trio, quintet or sextet combinations. They intentionally concentrated on works that were not considered standard works of classical and romantic chamber music. For this reason, quartets of Haydn and Beethoven were relatively rarely played on their programmes; instead the Amar Quartet played works of Schumann, Verdi and Dvořák. The ensemble rapidly became known for its unfussy, clear interpretations of the classics.

The Amar Quartet was of towering importance in concert life of the 1920s thanks to its indefatigable commitment to contemporary music. The fact that the works of Paul Hindemith stood at the centre of these efforts is not surprising, in view of the personal union of composer and interpreter. But the Amar Quartet was also committed to performing the works of other composers. Strings quartets by Béla Bartók, Max Butting, Alfredo Casella, Alois Hába, Philipp Jarnach, Ernst Krenek, Maurice Ravel, Arnold Schoenberg, Igor Stravinsky, Anton Webern and many others were included on their programmes. A considerable number of premieres of contemporary works were given by the Amar Quartet.

== Style of interpretation ==
The interpretations of contemporary music by the Amar Quartet met with unanimous enthusiasm amongst composers and reviewers. Anton Webern wrote to Alban Berg from the music festival in Salzburg in 1922 about performances of his Movements for String Quartet, Op. 5 and Schoenberg's F-sharp minor Quartet, Op. 10 as follows:

"I don't need to tell you about the incredible effect of the F-sharp minor Quartet. Or maybe I do: for it was a very rare event. The Hindemith Quartet played excellently. As far as my Quartet was concerned: performance (Hindemith) very good. Really played like music."

The Quartet attracted particular interest when they interpreted Hindemith's own works. A critic was both fascinated and amazed when he wrote the following in November 1927 after a concert in Zurich:

"Hindemith writes for his viola, his quartet, so that they follow his lead, only that his viola part sometimes jerks through the ensemble like a snake and carries everything away with it. The result is that the artists can perform their pieces in a tempo that would make one dizzy without sacrificing a single note. For example, if the first movement of the String Trio (Op. 34) could be performed more modestly, it might be seen that the piece is actually quite pretty."

== Recordings ==
The Amar Quartet made recordings for Polydor Records and Parlophone Records:

- Paul Hindemith: String Quartet No.4, Op.22; World Premiere Recording 1925 (Polydor 66198/200)
- Igor Stravinsky: Concertino for String Quartet; World Premiere Recording 1925 (Polydor 66201)
- Ernst Krenek: String Quartet No.3, Op.20, 4th movement; World Premiere Recording 1925 (Polydor 66201)
- Wolfgang Amadeus Mozart: String Quartet No.23 in F major, K.590; World Premiere Recording 1926 (Polydor 66416/18)
- Wolfgang Amadeus Mozart: String Quartet No.16 in E-flat major, K.428, 4th movement; rec.1926 (Polydor 66416/18)
- Giuseppe Verdi: String Quartet in E minor; World Premiere Recording 1926 (Polydor 66419/21)
- Antonín Dvořák: String Quartet No.12 in F major, Op.96 "American", 4th movement; World Premiere Recording 1926 (Polydor 66419/21)
- Paul Hindemith: String Quartet No.4, Op.22; rec.1926 (Polydor 66422/4)
- Béla Bartók: String Quartet No.2, Op.17; World Premiere Recording 1926 (Polydor 66425/8)
- Wolfgang Amadeus Mozart: String Quartet No.16 in E-flat major, K.428; rec.1927 (Polydor 66568/70)
- Ludwig van Beethoven: String Quartet No.11 in F minor, Op.95 "Serious"; rec.1927 (Polydor 66571/4)
- Paul Hindemith: String Trio No.1, Op.34, 1st & 2nd movements; World Premiere Recording 1927 (Polydor 66571/4)
- Max Reger: String Trio No.1 in A minor, Op.77b; World Premiere Recording 1927 (Polydor 66575/7)
- Wolfgang Amadeus Mozart: String Quartet No.15 in D minor, K.421, 3rd movement; rec.1928 (Parlophon P 9351)
- Wolfgang Amadeus Mozart: String Quartet No.21 in D major, K.575, 2nd movement; rec.1928 (Parlophon P 9351).

== Sources ==
- Arthur Eaglefield-Hull, A Dictionary of Modern Music and Musicians (Dent, London 1924).
- Robert Donaldson Darrell, The Gramophone Shop Encyclopedia of Recorded Music (New York 1936).
- Tully Potter, CD liner notes for Hindemith as Interpreter: The Amar-Hindemith Quartet (Arbiter Records 139, 2003).
- Amar-Hindemith Quartet: Historical Recordings (Polydor Records, Parlophon Records, 1925–1928).
