= Michael Leinert =

German stage director, dramaturg, and writer (born 1942)

Michael Leinert (born 1942 in Meldorf / Schleswig-Holstein, Germany) is a stage director, dramaturg, editor and author. His father, Friedrich Leinert was a composer, conductor and professor of music in Hannover. Leinert's mother was an operatic and concert singer.

== Studies and first engagement ==
Leinert studied music (Oboe) at the Hochschule für Musik Detmold, German literature and history of the arts at LMU Munich. His teachers of drama and opera direction were August Everding, Heinz Arnold and Götz Friedrich. In 1970, he became a dramaturg and director for drama and opera at the theater of Kiel. Following this appointment, came further engagements as dramaturg and stage director at the Staatstheater Braunschweig, the Hamburg State Opera and at the Bavarian State Opera in Munich. From 1983 to 1985, he was Oberspielleiter (stage director) at the Landestheater Coburg. In 1985, Leinert became the personal assistant of General-Intendant Tobias Richter at Theater Bremen.

== Artistic Director and General Manager ==
In 1988, he was appointed artistic director and general manager of Pfalztheater Kaiserslautern and from 1991 to 1999 he was the artistic director and general manager of the Staatstheater Kassel. In autumn 1999, Leinert started his position as Chefdramaturg and stage director of the Deutsche Oper am Rhein (until summer 2006).

Since 2007, he lives with his wife, opera singer and teacher Susan Owen-Leinert in Memphis Tennessee.

== International engagements ==
Leinert directed plays and operas in Germany, Italy, Denmark, Russia, the United States and Cyprus. He created and directed the first Cypriote opera Manoli by Vassos Arghyrides and Giorgos Neophytou, also the world premiere of Ingomar Gruenauer's Amleth und Fengo in Heidelberg and Jürg Baur's first chamber opera (Libretto: M. Leinert after Anton Chechov's The novel with the contrabass), in Düsseldorf, 2005. At Florida's Palm Beach Opera, Leinert directed Samson et Dalila, Richard Wagner's Der Fliegende Holländer and Tannhäuser in 2002.

In 2002, he directed at the National Theatre of Cyprus in Nicosia the world premiere of the Greek translation of Goethe's FAUST by Nikos Kazantzakis.

At the chamber opera of Hamburg he directed Donizetti's Il Borgomastro di Saardam, Mozart's Le nozze di Figaro, Giovanni Paisiello's Il barbiere di Siviglia and Wagner's Das Liebesverbot.

In March 2006, he produced the opera Hamlet by Ambroise Thomas at the Deutsche Oper am Rhein.

In March 2007, he was the stage director oft the play Don Juan (play) by Molière with The Cyprus Theatre Organisation THOC in Nicosia.

Leinert directed Don Giovanni, Der Ring des Nibelungen (Staatstheater Kassel 1997–99), Tristan und Isolde, Tannhäuser, Der Fliegende Holländer (Kassel, Aachen, Festival in Heidenheim, Ferrara, Parma, Padua, Palm Beach Opera / Florida), Wozzeck, Tosca, La Bohème, Madama Butterfly, Il tabarro, Gianni Schicchi, Manon Lescaut, Rigoletto, Jenůfa, Sibelius': The Maiden in the Tower and Rachmaninov's Francesca da Rimini (First premiere in Germany), Pagliacci, Cavalleria rusticana and Ernst Krenek's Orpheus und Eurydike.

Leinert's stage direction of Ján Cikker's Das Erdbeben in Chile (First premiere in Germany. opera after the novel of Heinrich von Kleist) was rated "Best production of the month" by the opera magazine Orpheus International. For his stage direction of Leoncavallo's Pagliacci at the opera Halle he received a nomination in the magazine Opernwelt Year Book 1994/95 (Critic's inquiry) for his "expressive stage direction".

== Theatre and drama ==
Leinert produced theatre plays, such as Friedrich Schiller's (Die Braut von Messina, Die Jungfrau von Orleans), Johann Wolfgang von Goethe's (Faust), Witold Gombrowicz (Yvonne, Prinzessin von Burgund), Jean Racine (Phaedra) and Molière. His production of Nikolaj V. Koljada's monodrama Die Amerikanerin (The American woman) was premiered in Germany, Russia and in Greek translation at Skala Theater, Larnaca, Cyprus.

Leinert was the initiator of the First European Drama Award Competition (in connection with the art exhibition documenta IX in Kassel, 1992), promoted by Peter Ustinov and August Everding.

== Contemporary music theatre ==
He also performed experimental authors and modern music composers such as Mauricio Kagel (Presentation, Pas de cinq, Himmelsmechanik, etc.), John Cage (Theatre piece, 4:33), Bent Lorentzen (Perogolesi's Home Service, Fackeltanz), Wilfried Hiller (IJOB - world premiere at the Bavarian State Opera of Munich, Opera Festival 1979 with Lorenz Fehenberger, tenor), Hans - Joachim Hespos (Nachtvorstellung, world premiere 1986 in Bremen/Concordia), György Ligeti (Rondeau), Jörg Wyttenbach (Streichquartett), Manfred Trojahn, Dieter Schnebel (Nostalgie - Solo for conductor without an orchestra), Manfred Niehaus, Marc Neikrug (Through roses), Karlheinz Stockhausen, Hans Jürgen von Bose (BLUTBUND, world premiere at Hamburg State Opera).

== Translations and Composer's Biography ==
Leinert translated Jean Sibelius' Maiden in the tower into the German language as well as Gaetano Donizetti's Il pazzi per progetto and Tom Johnson's The four note opera. He has written and directed radio plays, opera libretti, and three musical plays for children.

His biography of the German Romantic Composer Carl Maria von Weber was published in the fifth edition by the Rowohlt Verlag (Serie Monografien) and has been translated into Swedish and Chinese. He also published articles in various music magazines and wrote essays for the SPOHR JAHRBÜCHER (Stadt Braunschweig) and about Carl Maria von Weber and Carl Czerny for the Lexikon "Schriften über Musik" Vol. 2 (2023).

== The Spohr Society of the United States ==
Together with Susan Owen-Leinert he founded the Spohr Society of the United States of America and edited the first complete and critical edition of Louis Spohr’s Lieder in 12 vols. with the publisher Dohr in Cologne, Germany.

Leinert has taught as a guest professor of opera history and opera literature and drama at the University of Bremen, TU Braunschweig, the University of Hamburg, and LMU Munich. At Robert Schumann Hochschule in Düsseldorf, he gave lessons in stage direction for the opera department. He was one of the directors of the Memphis Opera & Song Academy at the University of Memphis, Tennessee, US, his wife's summer academy for singers.

== The Chamber Opera of Memphis ==
Leinert was the artistic director of several Studios for Contemporary Experimental Music Theatre in Germany, for example in Kiel, where he was also the director of "Musica nova" (1970–1974); later in Braunschweig, Coburg, at the Hamburg State Opera (Opera stabile), at the Bavarian State Opera in Munich (together with Walter Haupt) and in Bremen. In Memphis, Tennessee, he founded together with his wife, Susan Owen-Leinert, the Chamber Opera of Memphis, a forum for contemporary Music Theater.

== Libretti (selection) ==
- Music Theater
  - Friedrich Leinert Status quo. Chamber Opera. World premiere at Hannover University of Music, Drama and Media, Germany
  - Friedrich Leinert Eine Note nach der anderen. Chamber Opera. World premiere at Hannover University of Music, Drama and Media, Germany
  - Friedrich Leinert A.H. - Bilder aus einem Führerleben. Opera Collage. World premiere at Musiktheater im Revier, Gelsenkirchen, Germany
  - Bent Lorentzen Fackeltanz Chamber Opera. World premiere at Ebeltoft Music Festival on YouTube, Denmark
  - Bent Lorentzen A wondrous love story Tristan-Variationen. World premiere at the Bavarian State Opera Munich, Theater im Marstall.
  - Bent Lorentzen Pergolesi's Home Service (German version). Chamber Opera. German premiere at Staatstheater Kassel.US premiere at the Chamber Opera of Memphis, Tennessee
  - Bent Lorentzen Der Steppenwolf (after Hermann Hesse). Opera (Duration: 120:00). Publisher Edition_S_music-sound-art, Copenhagen.
- Music Theater – German Translations:
  - Jean Sibelius Die Jungfrau im Turm, Edition Wilhelm Hansen, Copenhagen.
  - Tom Johnson The 4 Note Opera (Vier Ton Oper), Sikorski Musikverlage, Hamburg and G. Schirmer Inc., New York.
- Libretti of Operas for Children:
  - Das Zauberhorn after Carl Maria von Weber’s Oberon. World premiere at the Chamber opera of Hamburg.
  - Die Zauberflöte after Wolfgang Amadeus Mozart.
  - Der Freischütz und der Teufel after Carl Maria von Weber. World premiere: 28. November 2000 st Deutsche Oper am Rhein Düsseldorf-Duisburg.
