= Anna Hirzel-Langenhan =

Swiss classical pianist (1874-1951)

Anna Hirzel-Langenhan (20 August 1874 – 15 December 1951) was a Swiss pianist and music educator.

== Life ==
Born in Lachen, Hirzel-Langenhan studied at the Zurich University of the Arts and in Vienna with Theodor Leschetizky and Anna Jessipowa. From 1898 she worked in Munich, after she and her husband Richard Langenhan, who accepted a position as the second Kapellmeister of the Munich Philharmonic (next to Felix Weingartner), had settled there. Both made their debut in the Kaimkonzert on 5 October 1898 with Piano Concerto No. 1 by Tchaikovsky. In addition to her work as a soloist, she frequently performed with members of the Kaimorchester in chamber music evenings and achieved a respected position in Munich's musical life. Therefore, when her husband died unexpectedly in March 1900, she remained there and began to give piano lessons more and more. During her intensive teaching activities she looked after an international circle of students, including Edith Picht-Axenfeld, Hermann Abendroth, Erich Doflein, Werner Egk, Hans Leygraf and Maria Landes-Hindemith and Clara Haskil and Renata Borgatti. A highlight of her concert activity was the performance of all violin sonatas by Beethoven with Eugène Ysaÿe in March 1903. In 1911 she almost completely ended her concert activity because of severe gout.

From 1926, Hirzel-Langenhan lived in Lugano and from 1934 in Schloss Berg in the Swiss canton of Thurgau, where she taught the pianist André Casanova, who later became famous. Her estate is kept in the Basel University Library.

Hirzel-Langenhan died in Berg at the age of 77.

== Publications ==
- Greifen und Begreifen. Ein Weg zur Anschlagskultur. Editor: Pina Pozzi and Franzpeter Goebels. Mit einem Geleitwort von Renata Borgatti. Bärenreiter-Verlag, Kassel / Basel / Paris / London / New York 1963
- Greifen und Begreifen. Bärenreiter-Verlag, Kassel [among others] 2008 (10th ed.), ISMN 979-0-006-43990-4
