= Maria Landes-Hindemith =

German woman pianist

Maria Landes-Hindemith, née Maria Landes, (13 March 1901 – 1987) was a German pianist and music educator; she was Paul Hindemith sister in law; and Rudolf Hindemith's wife.

== Life ==
Born in Munich the daughter of an engineer, Landes was taught to play the piano early on by Anna Hirzel-Langenhan, Hermann Zilcher and Walter Lampe. Rudolf Hindemith, later her husband, also worked with her to perfect her playing. She celebrated successes at home and abroad, but ultimately remained as an assistant and then professor at the Hochschule für Musik und Theater München, where Lampe also taught previously. There she tailored her teaching to the individual needs of the students and was considered a master of music education.

Among her students were Max Greger junior, Mari Holló, Annamaria Bodoky-Krause, Rudolf Kelber, Alla von Buch, Ernest Sauter, Ludger Maxsein, Martin Hilmer, Monika Leonhard, Franz Weilnhammer, Matitjahu Kellig, Berno Scharpf, Werner Heider, Manfred Eigen and Heinrich Mörtl.

== Publications ==
- Kompendium der Klaviertechnik. Robert Lienau Musikverlag, Berlin, 1993 (postum). ISMN 979001140020-3
