= Willi Kahl =

German musicologist (1893–1962)

Theodor Friedrich Wilhelm Willi Kahl (18 July 1893 – 3 October 1962) was a German musicologist.

== Life ==
Born in Saverne ([Alsace], from 1911 Kahl studied musicology, classical philology and German literature in Freiburg im Breisgau, Munich and Bonn. One of his teachers was Ludwig Schiedermair. He also completed training in music theory and piano. From 1914 to 1919 he served in the army and took part in World War I. In 1919 he received his doctorate under Schiedermair in Bonn with the work Das lyrische Klavierstück zu Beginn des 19. Jahrhunderts und seine Vorgeschichte im 17./18. Jahrhundert (The lyrical piano piece at the beginning of the 19th century and its prehistory in the 17th/18th century). Afterwards he worked as a music critic for the Kölnische Zeitung. In 1923 he habilitated with his dissertation Studien zur Geschichte der Klaviermusik des 18. Jahrhunderts (Studies on the history of piano music of the 18th century) and joined the library service in the same year. In 1928 he became library councillor at the Universitäts- und Stadtbibliothek Köln and at the same time received an extraordinary professorship at the University of Cologne. He retired in 1958 and died in Cologne at the age of 69.

The focal points of his academic work are the history of piano music, Schubert research, as well as the music history of the Rhineland and the music bibliography.

Kahl had been married to Katharina Maria Elisabeth Poppelreuter since 1923. He died at the age of 69 in a Cologne hospital.

== Writings ==
- Das lyrische Klavierstück Schuberts und seiner Vorgänger seit 1810. In Archiv für Musikwissenschaft. Jahrgang 3, 1921, pp. 54–82 and pp. 99–122.
- Aus der Frühzeit des lyrischen Klavierstücks. In Zeitschrift für Musik. Jahrgang 39, 1922, pp. 177–182 and p. 201ff.
- Schuberts lyrische Klavierstücke. In Bericht über den Internationalen Kongress für Schubertforschung. Augsburg 1929, p. 196ff.
- Norbert Burgmüller als Typus des Frühvollendeten. In Die Musik. Jahrgang 22.1, issue 3, Dezember 1929, pp. 188–190.
- Verzeichnis des Schrifttums über Franz Schubert 1828–1928. Bosse, Regensburg 1938 (Kölner Beiträge zur Musikforschung. Vol. 1).
- Selbstbiographien deutscher Musiker des 18. Jahrhunderts. Cologne 1948 (contains contributions from Johann Sebastian Bach, Carl Philipp Emanuel Bach, Johann Wilhelm Häßler, Joseph Haydn, Johann Peter Kellner, Johann Joachim Quantz, Johann Heinrich Quiel, Gottfried Heinrich Stölzel and Georg Philipp Telemann).
- Frühe Lehrwerke für das Hammerklavier. In Archiv für Musikwissenschaft. Jahrgang 9, 1952, p. 231ff.
- Studien zur Kölner Musikgeschichte des 16. und 17. Jahrhunderts (Universität – Tricoronatum).. Köln-Krefeld 1953 (Beiträge zur rheinischen Musikgeschichte. Issue 3).
- Das Nürnberger historische Konzert von 1643 und sein Geschichtsbild. In Archiv für Musikwissenschaft. Jahrgang 14, 1957, p. 281ff.
- Katalog der in der Universitäts- und Stadt-Bibliothek Köln vorhandenen Musikdrucke des 16., 17. und 18. Jahrhunderts. Volk, Cologne 1958 (Beiträge zur rheinischen Musikgeschichte. Issue 27).
- Bilder und Gestalten aus der Musikgeschichte des Rheinlandes. Volk, Cologne 1964 (Beiträge zur rheinischen Musikgeschichte. Issue 59).

== Editions ==
- Norbert Burgmüller, Ausgewählte Lieder, Mönchengladbach: Volksvereinsverlag, 1928
- Franz Schubert, Werke für Klavier zu vier Händen, four volumes, Munich: Henle, around 1958

== Literature ==
- Thomas Phleps: Ein stiller, verbissener und zäher Kampf um Stetigkeit – Musikwissenschaft in NS-Deutschland und ihre vergangenheitspolitische Bewältigung. in Isolde v. Foerster et al. (ed.), Musikforschung – Nationalsozialismus – Faschismus, Mainz 2001, pp. 471–488. online Uni Giessen
