= Rudolf Hindemith =

German composer and conductor

- Born: 9 January 1900; Hanau
- Died: 7 October 1974 (aged 74); Neuperlach, Bavaria
- Other names: Paul Quest; Hans Lofer
- Occupations: Cellist; Conductor; Composer; Piano teacher
- Organizations: Vienna State Opera; Amar Quartet
- Spouse: Maria Landes-Hindemith

Rudolf Hindemith, since 1951 officially Paul Quest, pseudonym Hans Lofer (9 January 1900 – 7 October 1974) was a German cellist, composer and conductor. He was solo cellist of the Vienna State Opera, and played chamber music in the Amar Quartet. He stood often in the shadow of his famous brother Paul but was rediscovered in recent years as a composer of an opera, a piano concerto, chamber music and piano pieces.

== Life ==
Born in Hanau, Rudolf Hindemith grew up with his brother Paul. They made music together early. From age 10, Rudolf took cello lessons at Dr. Hoch's Konservatorium in Frankfurt. He was engaged as solo cellist at the orchestra of the Münchener Konzertverein (later the Münchner Philharmoniker). From 1921 to 1924, he served in the same function in the orchestra of the Vienna State Opera, with conductors including Richard Strauss and Franz Schalk.

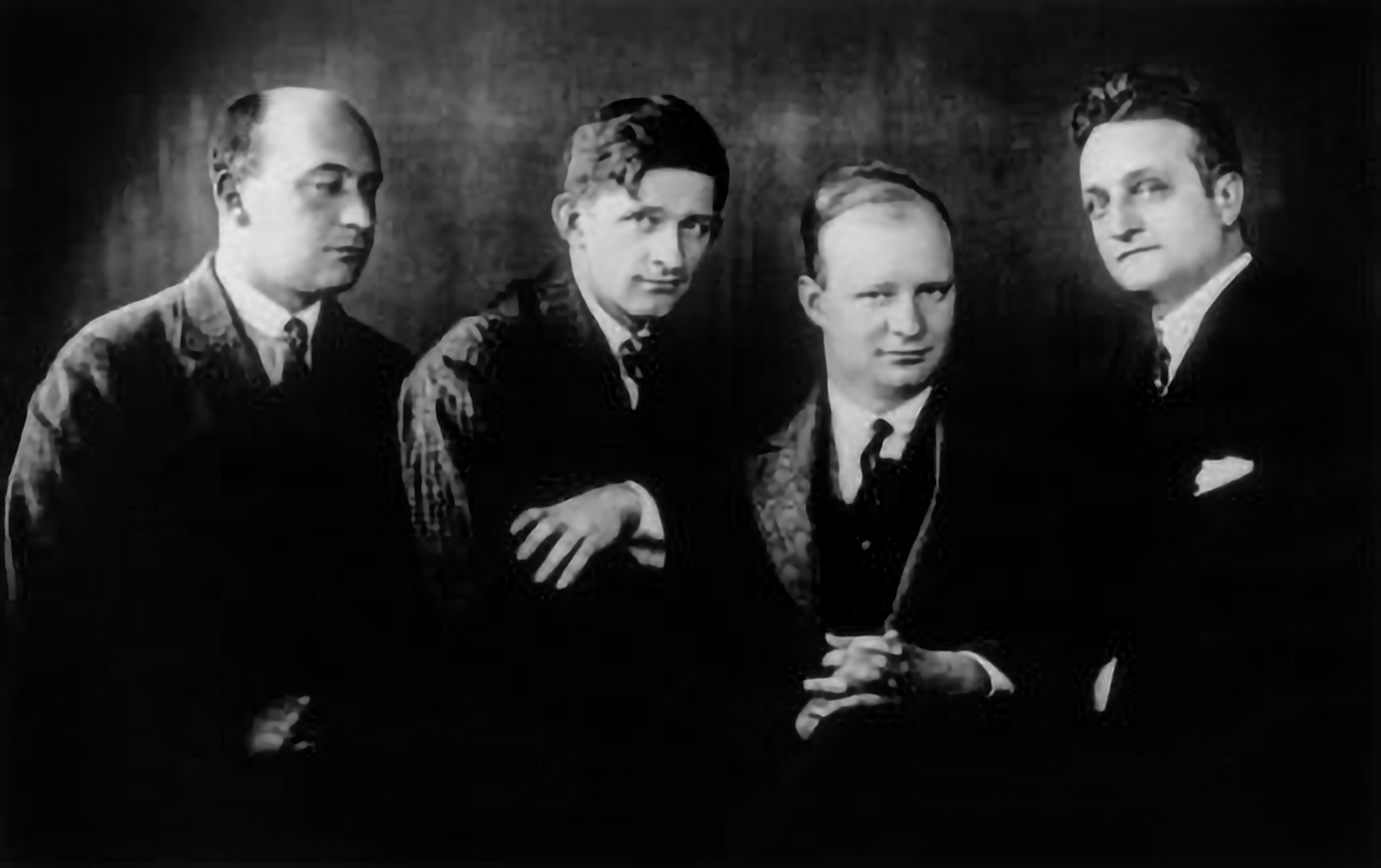
Amar Quartet in 1925, with Rudolf Hindemith 2nd from left, Paul Hindemith 3rd from left

The Hindemith brothers played in the Amar Quartet, one of the leading groups of the contemporary music scene of the 1920s, with Paul as violist and Rudolf as cellist. Rudolf soon dropped out, because he often felt set back behind Paul, and switched to the genres of brass music and jazz. While Paul emigrated from Nazi Germany to Switzerland in 1938, Rudolf remained and became a conductor. He led the symphony orchestra of the General Government in Kraków, a project of Gauleiter Hans Frank.

After the Second World War, Hindemith led a restless life as a composer, conductor and also educator, using numerous pseudonyms to avoid being addressed as Hindemith. In 1958, his opera Des Kaisers neue Kleider after Andersen's The Emperor's New Clothes was premiered in Bremen, conducted by George Alexander Albrecht who had studied with Lofer without knowing his identity. Hindemith was married to Maria Landes-Hindemith, first his piano student, then professor of piano at the Musikhochschule München.

Rudolf Hindemith died in isolation in 1974 in Neuperlach near Munich at the age of 74. His gravestone was inscribed with the pseudonym "Hans Lofer".

== Work and rediscovery ==
In the 1990s, some of his students began to remember him more and more, even though he was considered a bizarre and sometimes cruel teacher. The musicologist Gerd Brill from the University of Münster has begun a biography. A three-day Festival was held in Bremen in February 2001, presenting some of his piano pieces, chamber music and the premiere of his Piano Concerto from the 1960s, which he had entitled Suite for Piano and Orchestra. Soloist Kolja Lessing and the Bremer Philharmoniker conducted by George Alexander Albrecht played the original work in five movements.

In 2005, the pianist Stephanie Timoschek dedicated her thesis at the University of Music and Performing Arts Graz to him and especially his piano works, which include 6 Dances, 7 Sonatinas, 5 Pieces, 7 Preludes and Fugues, 13 School Fugues, 27 Two-Part School Fugues and a waltz from his opera Des Kaisers neue Kleider.

=== Editor ===
In the late 1920s, Hindemith undertook a new edition of some of the cello concertos by Georg Goltermann.

- Concerto I. A minor, Opus 14
- Concerto III. B minor, Opus 51
- Concerto IV. G major, Opus 65
- Concerto VI. D major, Opus 100

=== Recordings ===
The Amar Quartet with Rudolf Hindemith as the cellist can be heard on a CD published by Arbiter in 2011, including the premiere recording of Bartók's String Quartet No. 2. The Dreyer-Gaido label released three CDs, entitled Rudolf Hindemith Edition, between 2003 and 2010. In 2008, Stephanie Timoschek made a premiere recording of the complete piano works on 2 CDs for ORF.
