= Ernst Wachter =

German operatic bass

Ernst Wachter (19 May 1872 – August 1931) was a German operatic bass and music educator.

== Life and career ==
Born in Mülhouse, Wachter, real name Wächter, attended school in Leipzig, where his parents, the engineer Adolph Julius Carl Wächter and his wife Emma Marie Caroline, had moved from Alsace because of the father's job. After attending school, Wachter became a trainee in a Leipzig shop, as he was to take up a commercial profession. After the death of the shop owner and the dissolution of the company, the aspiring merchant reoriented himself professionally.

=== Vocal training in Leipzig ===
Following on from his low voice, with which he had "attracted attention in family and club circles" as a youth, he now endeavoured to give it "an artistic education". He became a pupil of the Kammersänger and chief director of the Leipzig Stadttheater Albert Goldberg (1847-1905), who was also a "teacher of the art of singing", and trained with him to become a bass.

On 12 April 1893, he began his one-year singing training with Goldberg and on 12 April 1894 he auditioned at the Court Opera in Dresden.

=== Singing in Dresden ===
In Dresden, the young singer immediately received a five-year contract at the Semperoper. On 10 May 1894, he made his first public appearance as Captain "Ferrando" in the opera Il trovatore. He then took on the role of Hermit in Der Freischütz by Weber on 19 May 1894 and the role of the character "Sarastro" in the opera by Wolfgang Amadeus Mozart on 7 June of the same year. His outstanding bass voice was promptly reported in the newspaper Neue Freie Presse in Vienna by the correspondent Paul Lindau (1839-1919), who was then a resident of Strehlen near Dresden (1891-1895).

Ferdinand Gleich (1816-1898) praised Wachter's special singing voice in the Dresdner Anzeiger as a music critic, using the example of the part of Sarastro in The Magic Flute, which he had taken on. Gleich especially praised how skilfully the bass performed the arias O Isis und Osiris, welche Wonne! as well as In diesen heiligen Hallen in the performance of the opera Die Zauberflöte. The newspaper Das Journal was also pleased that the Court Theatre had found "the long-sought serious deep bass." The "impressive firmness of tone", his "immensely secure, precise pronunciation" as well as the "euphony" of the bass and also of his voice "in the middle and high register" were emphasised. The first bass Wachter was held in high esteem as an "ornament of the Dresden Opera" and beyond the metropolis on the Elbe.

Wachter was admitted to the Tonkünstler-Verein zu Dresden in 1897/98. The opera singer performed four Lieder für eine Bassstimme with pianoforte for the first time at the public "Neunten Übungs-Abend" of this association on 4 March 1898. The Lieder had been composed by Georg Pittrich to texts by four poets, including Emanuel Geibel (1815-1885), "Du bist so still". The court opera singer was accompanied by the composer at the piano during his performance.

Wachter first sang Kaspar, the first hunter boy in Der Freischütz, at the Dresden Opera on 7 June 1900. The music critic Edgar Mansfield Pierson (1848-1919) regretted at this musical performance that the richly gifted singer did not make serious vocal and declamatory studies. On 1 May 1903, the bassist appeared at the Royal Opera House in the performance of Amelia oder Un ballo in maschera, Verdi's opera in three acts. Other main contributors were the opera singers Irene Abendroth (1872-1932), coloratura soprano; Irene von Chavanne (1863-1938), soprano and Erika Wedekind (1868-1944), soprano. The male roles were played and sung by the bass Ernst Wachter and the opera singers Karel Burian (1870-1924); tenor, Karl Scheidemantel (1853-1923) baritone; Franz Nebuschka, (1857-1917) bass-baritone and Leon Rains (1870-1954), bass. In the premiere of the one-act opera Salome, performed by soprano Marie Wittich (1868-1931), with music by Richard Strauss, Wachter took on the role of a "Cappadocian" (bass) under Ernst von Schuch's direction at the Dresden Hofoper on 9 December 1905.

=== Guest performance in Munich ===
Wachter sang at the Hofoper Munich in the period from "1 November 1900 to 1 November 1901" with the status of a guest. His contract was extended for another year until November 1902.

=== Guest appearances in Bayreuth ===
Wachter accepted several invitations to take part in the Bayreuth Festival. At the Bayreuth Festival he made his debut on 24 May 1896 with Wagner's character Fasolt in Das Rheingold and he sang Hunding in Die Walküre in 1897 and also the knight "Gurnemanz" in Parsifal twice each until 1899. In these roles, too, the full euphony and impeccable purity of his beautiful and powerful bass voice were emphasised. Wachter's distinctive bass voice was included in the album "100 Years of Bayreuth on Record" along with other vocal ranges of early Festival singers. Wachter remained in Dresden for another ten years after his performances at the Bayreuth Festival.

=== Opera premieres ===
Wachter performed at the Dresden Court Opera on 20 March 1901 together with the singers Friedrich Plaschke (1875-1952), Charlotte Huhn (born 1865), Marie Wittich (1868-1931), Rudolf Jäger (born 1875), Karl Scheidemantel (1859–1923), Erika Wedekind (1868–1944), Irene von Chavanne (1863-1938) and Mathilde Fröhlich (b. 1867) in the performance of the tragedy Nausikaa by August Bungert (1845-1915) from the cycle Homeric World under the conductor Ernst von Schuch. Already on 12 December 1896, he had sung with Karl Scheidemantel in Odysseus Homecoming, the third part of the multi-part opera tetralogy Homeric World. On 21 November 1901, Wachter appeared in the premiere of Richard Strauss' Feuersnot as the "Leitgeb Jörg Pöschel".

=== Awards ===
Wachter was honoured with the Medaille für Kunst und Wissenschaft (Mecklenburg-Schwerin).

=== Engagement in Zürich ===
From 1910, Wachter belonged to the Stadttheater in Zurich and he left the opera of this theatre again in 1912.

=== Opera singer and singing teacher in Leipzig ===
Wachter changed his place of residence again in 1912 from Dresden to Leipzig and worked there in his profession as an opera singer until 1919, after which he worked as a singing teacher in Gohlis until his death in August 1931. The concert singer Frieda Wachter continued to occupy the flat in the Leipzig district of Gohlis after Wachter's passing. The singer Gertrud Wachter was also temporarily resident at Möckernsche Straße 24 in Leipzig-Gohlis in the 1930s and as a widow became co-owner of the property at Löhrstraße 33, which had previously belonged in half to Wächter.

== Member of the Genossenschaft Deutscher Bühnen-Angehöriger ==
Wachter was a member of the Guild of the German Stage to Berlin. In its Deutsches Bühnen-Jahrbuch 1932, the guild informed about Wachter's death and named August of the previous year as the month of death. The yearbook paid tribute to the "former Saxon court opera singer" with an account of his professional life and described his last occupation as "singing master".
