= Gustav Scharfe =

German opera singer (1835–1892)

Gustav Scharfe (11 September 1835 – 25 June 1892) was a German operatic baritone and voice teacher.

== Life ==
Born in Grimma, Saxony, Scharfe was originally an assistant teacher (1854) at the Freiherrlich von Fletchersches Lehrerseminar and in 1856 at the Leipzig Institute for the Deaf and Dumb. However, because of his outstanding musical and vocal talents, he took on a successful engagement as an opera singer at the Dresden Court Opera for several years.

He later went to England and trained there for the higher demands of singing. Returning to Dresden, he devoted himself very successfully to teaching singing, most recently at the Hochschule für Musik Carl Maria von Weber, Dresden (along, among others, Felix Draeseke, Aglaja Orgeni). He was awarded the title Professor of Music by the King of Saxony for his services as a teacher in 1880.

Scharfe published an excellent singing school: Die methodische Entwicklung der Stimme (The Methodical Development of the Voice).

Scharfe died in Dresden, aged 56.

== Students ==
- Hans Buff-Giessen, Walther Falkenstein, Richard Gutzschbach, Erika Wedekind, Emil Goetze
