= Maude Fay =

American opera singer (1878–1964)

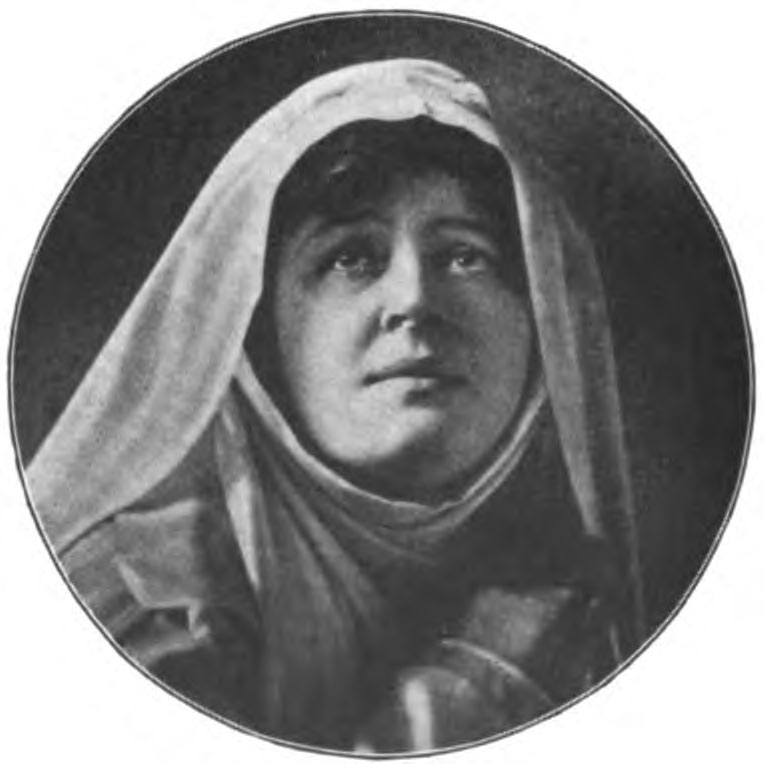
Maude Fay (ca. 1909).

Maude Fay (also spelled Maud Fay; 18 April 1878 – 7 October 1964) was an American operatic soprano who was known for singing dramatic roles.

== Biography ==
Originally from San Francisco, Maude Fay went to Dresden on the advice of Johanna Gadski. There she studied singing with the Hungarian soprano Aglaja Orgeni, who herself had studied with Pauline Viardot.

After three years of training in Dresden, Fay made her debut in 1906 at the Court Theater in Munich as Marguerite in Gounod's Faust. Her performance resulted in a five-year engagement to sing leading dramatic roles. She was particularly admired in Wagner. Other roles in Munich included the title role in Emil von Reznicek's comic opera Donna Diana (1 December 1908), Chrysothemis in Richard Strauss's Elektra at the Munich premiere with Felix Mottl conducting (14 February 1909), Hermann Waltershausen's Oberst Chabert (3 November 1912), and the title role in Richard Strauss's Ariadne auf Naxos at the Munich premiere with Bruno Walter conducting (30 January 1913). In the autumn of 1913 she sang Luigi Cherubini's "Ave Maria" in the Munich Frauenkirche as part of the enthronement ceremonies for Ludwig III of Bavaria. She also received the title of Königliche Bayerische Kammersängerin (Royal Bavarian Chamber Singer) for life.

She appeared in Thomas Beecham's 1910 season at His Majesty's Theatre in London, as Diemut in Richard Strauss's Feuersnot (9, 11, and 13 July 1910), and performed at Covent Garden in 1914 as Sieglinde in Wagner's Die Walküre and Elsa in Lohengrin, both performances conducted by Arthur Nikisch. She also appeared in Bayreuth, Berlin, Budapest, Dresden, Saint Petersburg, Vienna, and Chicago.

During World War I she made two appearances at the Metropolitan Opera in New York, singing Sieglinde (28 February 1916, with Gadski as Brünnhilde and Artur Bodanzky conducting) and Elsa (1 December 1916, also with Bodanzky).

After her marriage (12 July 1922) to Powers Symington, a graduate of Annapolis and a former captain of the USS Mississippi, she no longer appeared on stage and only gave concert performances. She was born and died in San Francisco.

== Recordings ==
- "Das süsse Lied verhallt...Atmest du nicht mit mir" from Lohengrin with Maude Fay (soprano) and Heinrich Knote (tenor), recorded in 1907. Included on the CD album Aus Münchens Operngeschichte (History of the Munich Opera) [Artists of the Munich State Opera, 1900-1945], Preiser CD 89405 (4 CDs, released May 2000). Also: Lebendige Vergangenheit (1999) OCLC 57139225.

== Gallery ==
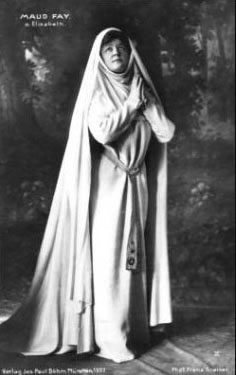
Elisabeth in Tannhäuser.

Gutrune in Götterdämmerung.

Elisabeth in Tannhäuser.

Margarethe (Marguerite) in Faust.

Senta in The Flying Dutchman.

Gräfin (Countess) in Figaro.
