= Bungert =

Bungert is a German surname. Notable people with the surname include:

- August Bungert (1845–1915), German opera composer and poet
- Niko Bungert (born 1986), German footballer
- Wilhelm Bungert (born 1939), German tennis player
