= Feuersnot =

1901 opera by Richard Strauss

- Opera by Richard Strauss
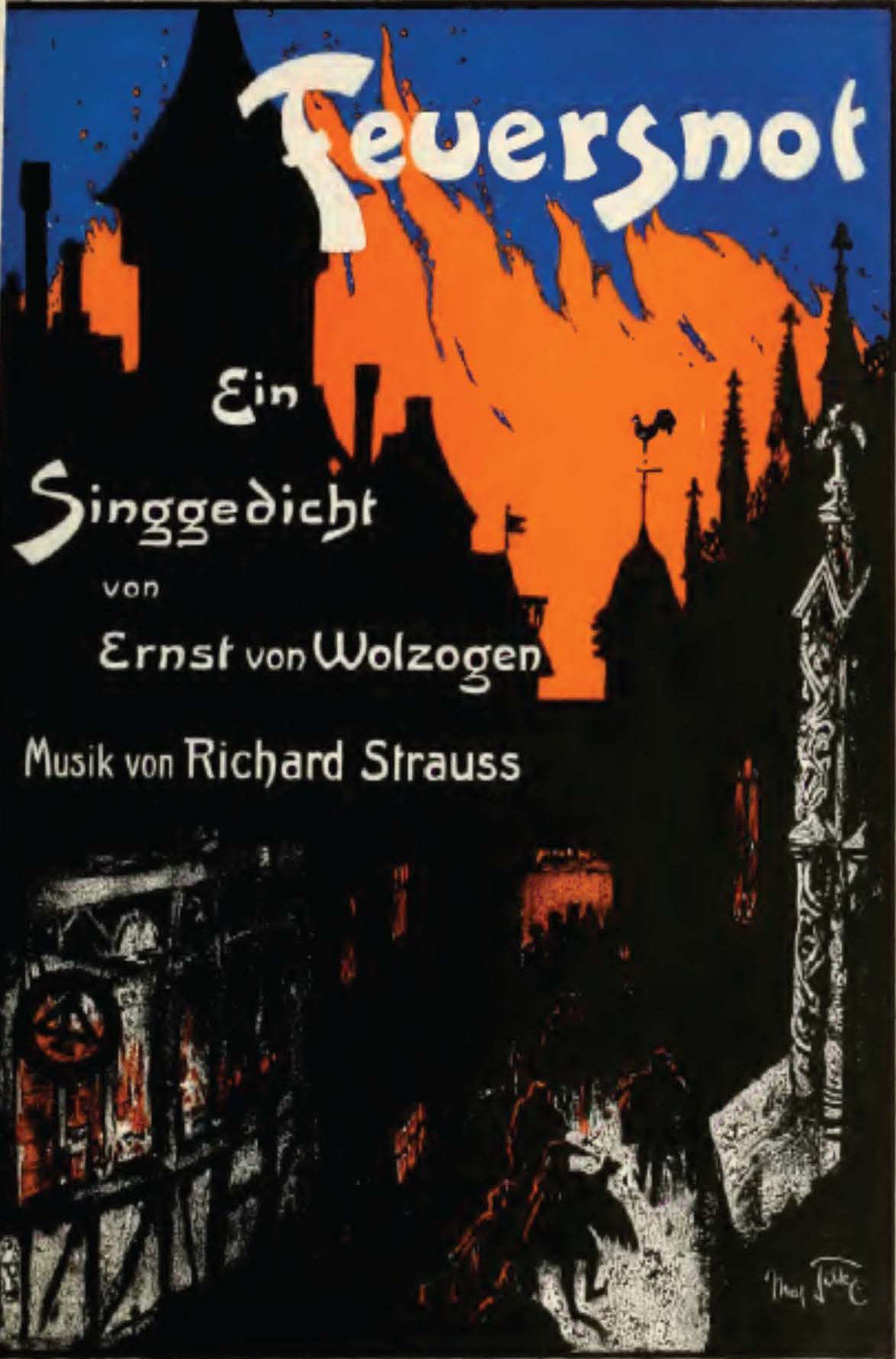
- Cover of a 1901 music score
- Librettist: Ernst von Wolzogen
- Language: German
- Based on: J. Ketel's "Das erloschene Feuer zu Audenaerde"
- Premiere: 21 November 1901; Königliches Opernhaus, Dresden

Feuersnot (Need for (or lack of) fire), Op. 50, is a Singgedicht (sung poem) or opera in one act by Richard Strauss. The German libretto was written by Ernst von Wolzogen, based on J. Ketel's report "Das erloschene Feuer zu Audenaerde" in the folktale collection Niederländische Sagen. It was Strauss' second opera.

Thematically, the opera has been interpreted as a parody of Richard Wagner's idea of "redemption through love", with the character of Kunrad representing Strauss himself. The conceptual framework for the opera stems from the Nietzschean perspective that had inspired Strauss in his tone poems Till Eulenspiegel and Also sprach Zarathustra. Strauss and von Wolzogen shared the view that the source of inspiration was material not transcendental: in Feuersnot it is "redemption through sex" which relights the creative fire.

== Performance history ==
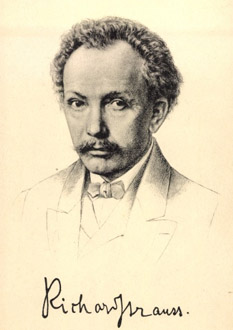
Post card of Strauss from 1900

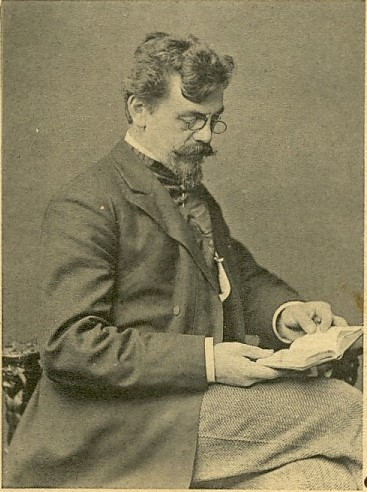
Ernst von Wolzogen

The librettist for the opera was Ernst von Wolzogen, who in 1901 founded the Überbrettl venue (German for "over cabaret, super-cabaret"), the start of the German Kabarett movement which was later to blossom in the Weimar Republic. The mood matched Strauss's desire for something irreverent and cynical, with much word-play (including the names of Wagner and Strauss), and a children's chorus singing "stanzas of quasi folk-song in broad dialect".

What struck the contemporary audiences most was the bawdiness and innuendo. There was much pressure on the composer to tone it down, but Strauss and the conductor of the premiere in Dresden, Ernst von Schuch, stuck to the original. At this time, the sexual and erotic subtexts and psychology were disturbing to audiences, as well as the perceived "advanced" nature of the music itself to more conservative-minded musicians.

The premiere at the Königliches Opernhaus on 21 November 1901 was a great success: Gustav and Alma Mahler attended and she recalls in her diary that Strauss was elated "after endless curtains". The success in Dresden led to Feuersnot being staged in many theaters across Germany, including a performance in Frankfurt conducted by Strauss himself. Mounting the opera in Vienna proved more problematic for Gustav Mahler because of the need to satisfy the uncooperative censor. Mahler wrote to Strauss in mid 1901: "Concerning Feuersnot, the censor seems, horribile dictu, to be making difficulties, since the work has not yet been passed, so that I am not in a position to send the contracts to Fuerstner. I fear you may have to accept changes ... Alas, there is no placating these powers."

The Viennese premiere finally took place on 29 January 1902 with Strauss attending. He wrote to Mahler "to send you my heartfelt thanks for the incomparably beautiful rendition you gave of my work last week" (letter 4 February 1902). The Viennese public and critics were less enthusiastic than the German; Max Graf wrote: "The critics have unanimously rejected the work". Mahler wrote to Strauss on 18 February: "I am so disgusted at the attitude of the Viennese press, and most of all by the public's total acquiescence to them, that I cannot get over it!" He took the work off after four disappointing turn-outs, although he did put on one further performance that year on 14 March (with a "popular ballet").

Strauss took the opera to Berlin where it was more of a success with seven performances, the premiere being on 28 October 1902. However, the Empress (Kaiserin) took a dislike to the bawdiness and Emperor (Kaiser) Wilhelm had the opera banned. Strauss continued to include the music from the love scene in his orchestral concerts.

The opera was revived twice at Vienna, first in 1905 by Mahler with a new production running for 7 performances and in 1922 by Strauss himself with six performances. Strauss wrote towards the end of his life "in nearly all of the biographical articles I read I miss the correct attitude towards Feuersnot. One forgets that this certainly far from perfect work still introduces into the nature of the old opera a new subjective style at just the very beginning of the century. It is in its way a sort of upbeat."

In London it was presented on 9 July 1910, while the US premiere was not given until 1 December 1927 by the Philadelphia Civic Opera Company at Philadelphia's Metropolitan Opera House with George Rasely as Gundelfingen and Alexander Smallens conducting. The Zürich premiere did not take place until 1953. The New York City premiere took place in 1985, at the Manhattan School of Music. It was presented by the Santa Fe Opera during its summer 1988 festival season. In the UK, Chelsea Opera Group presented a concert performance in 2000.

In 2014, the Strauss anniversary year, Feuersnot was revived by numerous opera houses worldwide. The Teatro Massimo staged the opera in January 2014, and there were concert performances the same year given by Bayerischer Rundfunk at Munich in February, and in June by the Dresden Semperoper. Eytan Pessen, former opera director of the Semperoper and artistic advisor to the Teatro Massimo Palermo, cast the opera twice for that season. Other 2014 performances included the Volksoper in Vienna, Theater Kaiserslautern, Theater am Gärtnerplatz in Munich, and Carnegie Hall.

The work is scored for 3 flutes (3rd doubles piccolo), 3 oboes (3rd doubles English horn), 2 clarinets, clarinet in D (doubles bass clarinet), 3 bassoons (3rd doubles contrabassoon), 4 horns, 3 trumpets, 3 trombones, bass tuba, timpani, percussion (bass drum, snare drum, triangle, cymbals, castanets, tambourine, glockenspiel), 2 harps, and strings (16,16,12,10,8). A second snare drum and a harmonium is required for the incidental music.

== Roles ==
Roles, voice types, premiere cast
Roles	Voice type	Premiere cast, 21 November 1901 Conductor: Ernst von Schuch
Schweiker von Gundelfingen, the bailiff	low tenor	Franz Petter
Ortolf Sentlinger, the mayor	low bass	Franz Nebuschka
Diemut, his daughter	high soprano	Annie Krull
Elsbeth, her friend	mezzo-soprano	Auguste Lautenbacher
Wigelis, her friend	low contralto	Irene von Chavanne
Margret, her friend	high soprano	Minnie Nast
Kunrad, the alchemist	high baritone	Karl Scheidemantel
Jörg Pöschel, the Leitgeb	low bass	Ernst Wachter
Hämmerlein, the haberdasher	baritone	Josef Höpfl
Kofel, the blacksmith	bass	Friedrich Plaschke
Kunz Gilgenstock, the baker and brewer	bass	Hans Geißler
Ortlieb Tulbeck, the cooper	high tenor	Anton Erl
Ursula, his wife	contralto	Franziska Schäfer
Ruger Aspeck, the potter	tenor	Theodor Kruis
Walpurg, his wife	high soprano	Gisela Staudigl
Citizens, women, children, retainers

== Synopsis ==
Place: Medieval Munich
Time: Midsummer Night

All warmth springs from woman, All light from love does flow – Truly, only the heat of a virgin's body can ignite your fires.

During the Midsummer Solstice festival, lovers swear to be faithful by leaping through the flames of a bonfire (known traditionally as Johannisfeuer, St John's Eve Fire). Love is in the air and children are collecting firewood for the solstice fire.

A sorcerer, Kunrad, has appeared in the city, taking over the house of an old sorcerer. His presence disturbs the people and leads to much speculation. Much to everyone's surprise, he offers the children his house for the solstice fire. The Mayor's daughter Diemut and her three friends are intrigued by Kunrad, and the friends find him rather attractive. Diemut is less impressed. Kunrad himself is more attracted to Diemut.

To everyone's shock he approaches Diemut and kisses her in public. She rebuffs him, but plots her revenge for the insult. She promises to bring him up to her room in a basket. He agrees, but she leaves him hanging halfway up. In retaliation, he quenches all the festival bonfires and denounces the people as philistines. He lays down a condition: the only way to restore the fires is via "the body of a virgin in heat", which shocks the populace. However, after some thought they persuade Diemut to yield to Kunrad. She does so, and after she has her first-ever sexual experience (depicted in the orchestral "love scene"), with a light glowing in her room, the fires are restored and Diemut and Kunrad emerge singing a love song.

== Recordings ==
Year	Cast (Diemut Kunrad)	Conductor, Opera house and orchestra	Label
1958	Maud Cunitz, Marcel Cordes	Rudolf Kempe; Bavarian State Opera Orchestra and Chorus (Live recording)	Orfeo D'Or; Cat: 423962
1978	Gundula Janowitz, John Shirley-Quirk	Erich Leinsdorf; Deutsches Symphonie-Orchester Berlin with Tölzer Knabenchor and RIAS Kammerchor (Live recording)	CD: Deutsche Grammophon; Cat:00289 479 2414.
1984	Júlia Várady, Bernd Weikl	Heinz Fricke; Munich Radio Orchestra with Tölzer Knabenchor and Bavarian Radio Chorus	CD: Arts Music; Cat:
2013 (1965)	Ingrid Bjoner, Marcel Cordes	Joseph Keilberth; Cologne Radio Orchestra and Radio Chorus	CD: Gala; Cat: GL 100-540
2014	Simone Schneider, Markus Eiche	Ulf Schirmer; Munich Radio Orchestra with Gärtnerplatz Theatre Children's choir and Bavarian Radio Chorus	CD: CPO; Cat: CPO: 777920-2
2015	Nikola Beller Carbone, Dietrich Henschel	Gabriele Ferro; Orchestra, Chorus and youth chorus of Teatro Massimo	Arthaus Musik; Cat: Arthaus 109065 (DVD), 109066 (Blu-ray)
