= Walther Falkenstein =

German opera singer and actor (1862–1940)

Walther Falkenstein, also Walther Siebert-Falkenstein and Walter Siebert, (8 February 1862 – 27 May 1940) was a German operatic tenor and stage actor.

== Life ==
Born in Dresden, Falkenstein devoted himself to a commercial profession after attending commercial school in Dresden. It was then that Franz Wüllner discovered his tenor voice and advised him to pursue a stage career.

After attending the Hochschule für Musik Carl Maria von Weber Dresden for three years, where Gustav Scharfe was his singing master, he took up engagements in Basel in 1885 and made his debut there as "Radames" and "Bois Rose". He then came to Mainz, Detmold, Metz, Breslau, Magdeburg, the Theater an der Wien (1890 to 1892), Wiesbaden in 1893, Frankfurt (1894 to 1895), Dresdner Residenztheater (1894 to 1895), Linz (1897 to 1899) and then joined the company of the Brno City Theatre, where he made his debut as "Postillon".

Falkenstein was an excellent operetta and opera tenor and knew how to use his vocal resources in a very successful way. His correct singing, his appearance and his extremely sympathetic acting were quite suitable to give a characteristic picture of his heroes. In addition to "Max", "Lyonel", "Faust" etc., "Gypsy Baron", "Beggar Student", "King" in "Don Caesar", "Arthur Bryk" in "Carnival in Rome" etc. should also be mentioned.

From 1902 the artist worked as a guest at the Landestheater in Linz and later again at the Stadttheater Brünn.

Falkenstein died in Bad Schandau at the age of 78.
