= Adele Osterloh =

German poet (1857–1946)

Adele Minna Osterloh (2 January 1857 – 3 January 1946) was a German poet.

== Life ==
Born in Dresden, Adele was the daughter of the Dresden banker Franz Günther. After a stay at a boarding school in Geneva and a trip to Italy, she married the gynaecologist Paul Osterloh (1849–1918), wrote novels and novellas. From 1905 she was deputy chairwoman of the Literarische Gesellschaft e. V. Dresden. She lived in Dresden at Wiener Str. 8. Osterloh wrote the play Das Märchen vom Glück in four acts around 1900. For the plot, Georg Pittrich (1870–1934) provided the music. The author's husband, Paul Osterloh, was an associate member of the Tonkünstler-Verein zu Dresden while there the composer and Kapellmeister Pittrich was a full member of the association.

After the death of her husband, the doctor's widow moved to Dresden's Elisenstraße 4 around 1920.

Osterloh translated Anna Maria van Schurman's dissertation "Darf eine christliche Frau studieren?" from Latin.

=== Daughters ===
The writer had three daughters: Edith, Paula and Ada (Adele). Her eldest daughter Edith (1878-1922), married Benn, 14 years after the accidental death of her first husband, Fritz Brosin († 1900) and her work as a theatre actress, the physician, poet and essayist Gottfried Benn. The journalist Nele Benn was her granddaughter.

The middle daughter Paula (1882–1968) married Carl Julius Stübel (1877–1974), a lawyer with a doctorate, in 1906 and was an artist under the name Stübel-Osterloh who took part in exhibitions of the Berlin Secession.

The youngest daughter Ada (Adele) lived temporarily with her two sisters in the garden city Hellerau. Her husband since 1910 was Georg Alfred Stübel (1880–1915), a doctor of law. He was killed in action in the First World War on 20 June 1915 in Lorraine. He is commemorated by a memorial plaque at the Johannis Cemetery in Dresden. After taking up her studies at the Veterinary College in Dresden in 1916, Ada Stübel switched to human medicine at the universities in Freiburg, Leipzig and Jena. There she passed the medical state examination in 1920 and was awarded her doctorate at the Thuringian State University in 1921 with a dissertation on varicose veins and pregnancy. Ada Stübel had obtained her research results by evaluating 48 varicose vein cases in the University Surgical Clinic under Director Professor Nicolai Guleke (1878-1958). When she submitted her doctoral thesis, A. Stübel had been employed at the Jena "Physiological Institute" as an assistant doctor since May 1921. She looked after her seven-year-old niece Nele Benn, especially when Edith Benn, née Osterloh, widowed Brosin, was taken in by the senior physician at the Jena University Surgical Clinic, Professor Georg Magnus (1883-1942), for a bilious complaint in November 1922. After the operation, however, Edith Benn died. In the second half of the 1920s, A. Stübel moved to Mainz and worked there as an ophthalmologist and in between, due to the war, in Lichtenberg (Fischbachtal). In the 1960s, her nephew, Christian Stübel (1906-1983), a doctor of law, the son of her sister Paula and grandson of Adele Osterloh, also lived in Mainz.

=== Brother-in-law ===
A brother-in-law of the poet, a brother of her husband Paul, was Gustav Eduard Osterloh (1842–1903), Major General at disposition since 1902 and previously lieutenant-colonel in the 2nd Field Artillery Regiment No. 28 from 1890. He lived with his wife Therese and daughter Hildegard in Leipzig, the birthplace of Osterloh's husband.

=== Resting place Johannisfriedhof ===
The burial of the poet took place on 10 January 1946 at the Johannisfriedhof in Dresden. She was 89 years old.

== Work ==
- Das Ende (Dresden 1896)
- Der Andere. Lustspiel (Dresden 1888)
- Der blonde Adjutant. Keine Soldatengeschichten (Dresden 1883)
- Oberlehrer Gesenius (Stuttgart 1896)
- Unter Kameraden (Dresden 1893).
- Die Sünden der Väter (Berlin 1898)
- Das Märchen vom Glück (Schauspiel), around 1900.
- Libretto to the operetta Der Wahrheitsmund (Bocca della Verità), Dresden 1899.
- Self-Confessions. In Deutsche Roman-Bibliothek 23 (1895).
- Eine pflichtvergessene Frau, Dresden 1919.

Her literary works also include stage plays, which remained unprinted. An unpublished manuscript by Osterloh entitled My Daughters is in the literary archive of the University Library of Hildesheim.
