= Bertrand Roth =

Swiss composer and pianist

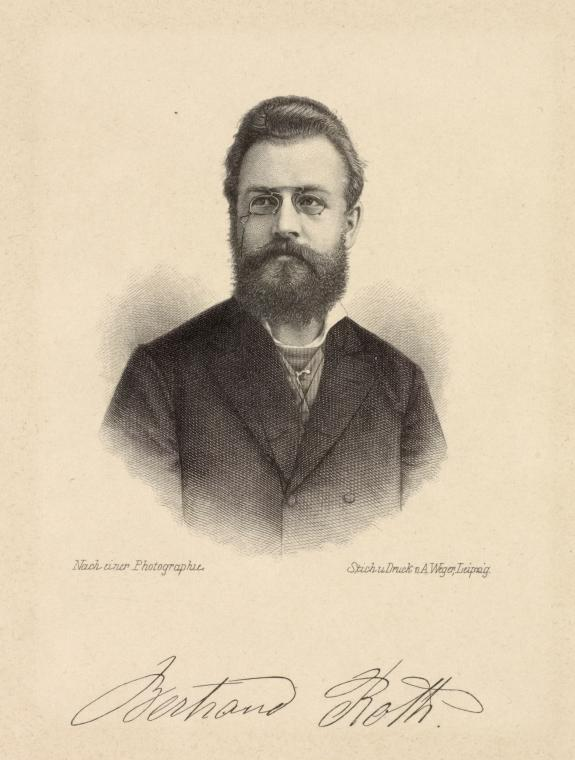
Bertrand Roth (1880s)

Bertrand Roth (12 February 1855 – 24 January 1938) was a Swiss composer and pianist.

== Life ==
Born in Degersheim in the Toggenburg region of Switzerland, Roth moved with his family to Plauen in 1858, after his father, an embroidery designer, had been commissioned to set up the first embroidery factory in the Kingdom of Saxony there. After attending grammar school, he began to study philosophy before turning to music and enrolled at the University of Music and Theatre Leipzig. In 1877, he moved as a pupil from Franz Liszt to Weimar, whom he accompanied on two trips to Pest and Rome.

In 1879, Roth appeared for the first time as soloist at the "Allgemeiner Deutscher Musikfest" in Wiesbaden. In 1880 he was appointed as a piano teacher at the Hoch Conservatory in Frankfurt. There he was one of the founders of the Raff Conservatory, of which he was co-director. Roth, who in the following years gave concerts in many cities in Germany, Italy and again and again in Switzerland, went to Dresden in 1884 as a piano virtuoso, teacher and composer. At the Dresden "Royal Conservatory" he gave piano lessons as a special subject since 1885. Among the pupils he taught, who received a "prize certificate" for their achievements as piano players, was Georg Pittrich. From 1901 to 1930, Roth held around 300 Sunday matinees with works by contemporary composers in the "Musiksalon Bertrand Roth" in Dresden. In 1903, he was appointed Royal Professor.

Roth was dedicated a street in Plauen on his 75th birthday in 1925: the Bertrand-Roth-Straße in 08525 Plauen.

Roth's compositional work includes songs, piano and string music.

Roth died in Bern at the age of 73.

Half of Roth's estate is kept in the Saxon State and University Library Dresden and half in the Plauen City Archives.
