= Marie Wittich =

German operatic soprano (1868–1931)

- Wittich as Sieglinde; Bayreuth, c. 1901
- Born: 27 May 1868; Gießen, Germany
- Died: 4 August 1931 (aged 63); Dresden, Germany
- Occupation: Operatic soprano
- Organizations: Dresden Royal Opera; Bayreuth Festival
- Title: Kammersängerin

Marie Wittich (27 May 1868 – 4 August 1931) was a German operatic dramatic soprano. She was a Kammersängerin of the Dresden Royal Opera where she sang for 25 years and was known for the power, vibrancy and dramatic quality of her voice. She created the leading female roles in the world premieres of several operas, most famously, the title role in Salome by Richard Strauss. The novelist E. M. Forster, who saw her 1905 Dresden performance as Brünnhilde in Der Ring des Nibelungen, wrote: "She towered. She soared. Force, weight, majesty! She seemed to make history."

== Biography ==
Marie Wittich was born in Gießen and studied singing in Würzburg with Frau Ober-Ubrich, a sister of the prominent soprano Asminde Ubrich. She made her stage debut in 1882 in Magdeburg as Azucena in Verdi's Il trovatore and went on to sing in Basel, Düsseldorf, Dresden, and Schwerin, where in 1886 she performed the title role of Gluck's Iphigénie en Aulide for the inauguration of the Mecklenburgisches Staatstheater. In 1889, she became a permanent member of the Dresden Royal Opera (Hofoper). Amongst her early performances, there were Lenore in Beethoven's Fidelio and Senta in Wgner's Der fliegende Holländer. While at Dresden, she also sang in several world premieres, including Penelope in August Bungert's Odysseus' Heimkehr (Odysseus' Return) (1896), Ulana in Paderewski's Manru (1901), and most famously the title role of Richard Strauss' Salome (1905).

Strauss cast Marie Wittich as his first Salome though he reportedly doubted her ability to portray the lithesome Salome; he decided her voice was more important than her appearance. During the rehearsals for the premiere of Salome, several members of the cast became dismayed by the demanding and complex nature of their parts, none more so than Wittich, who was reluctant to sing a role which Strauss described as "a sixteen-year old princess with the voice of Isolde". Her reply to him was, "One just does not write like that, Herr Strauss. Either one thing or the other." She and most of the cast nearly withdrew from the production, but eventually relented and continued with the rehearsals. However Wittich, who was 37 with a somewhat matronly figure (Strauss referred to her as "Auntie Wittich"), flatly refused to perform Salome's Dance of the Seven Veils or to kiss the severed head of John the Baptist. Her oft-quoted remark to Strauss in this respect was: "I won't do it; I'm a decent woman." In the end, the opening night on 9 December 1905 was a triumph with the singers taking 38 curtain calls. A ballerina from the Dresden company performed the Dance of the Seven Veils.

A distinguished Wagnerian singer, Wittich appeared regularly in Bayreuth from 1901 to 1909 where she sang Sieglinde, Kundry, and Isolde. She made her Royal Opera House debut in 1905 as Brünnhilde in a performance described as "one of the most sympathetic and womanly Brünnhildes we have seen here." She continued to sing there through 1906 in four other Wagner roles – Elsa, Elisabeth, Isolde, and Sieglinde. Other theatres where she sang as a guest artist after 1900 were the Prague State Opera (1902), the Théâtre Royal de la Monnaie in Brussels (1907), and the National Theatre in Munich (1906 and 1907). In 1914, she made her farewell to the stage in a performance of Tristan und Isolde in Dresden, and taught singing there following her retirement.

Marie Wittich died in Dresden on 4 August 1931 at the age of 63.
