= Georg Pittrich =

German composer and Kapellmeister

George Washington Pittrich (22 February 1870 – 17 March 1934) was a German composer and Kapellmeister.

== Life ==
Born in Dresden, Pittrich attended the Hochschule für Musik Carl Maria von Weber from 1884 to 1890, whose curriculum included theoretical subjects and keyboard, string and wind instruments. In addition, the students were taught oratory and singing. The curriculum also included stage training. The conservatory was founded in 1856 as a private teaching institution and on its 25th anniversary in 1881 the King of Saxony awarded it the title of "Royal Conservatory". His teachers at the Conservatoire were Ferdinand Braunroht (1856–1913) for harmony, counterpoint and piano; Felix Draeseke (1835–1913) for theory of form and higher composition; Adolf Hagen (1851–1926), for orchestral, compositional and directorial theory and practice in direction; Emil Robert Höpner, Kreuzorganist (1846–1903) from 1885 (retired in 1902) and teacher at the Conservatory for piano since 1874 and since 1 November 1885 for organ, Theodor Kirchner (1823 - 1903) for score-playing, Emil Naumann (1827–1888) for music history, and Bertrand Roth (1855–1938) for piano as a special subject. Pittrich received an organ prize donated by the Dresden City Council in 1888 after six months of organ lessons with Emil Höpner.

On the occasion of the 40th anniversary of the assumption of patronage of the Dresden Conservatory by the Crown Prince of Saxony, in 1898, in the presence of the now King Albert of Saxony, two songs composed by Pittrich were performed at the festive event, among others: Hoffnung and Du allein.

At a concert given by the Conservatoire in the autumn of 1888, Pittrich played the Prelude and Fugue for Organ in B minor by Johann Sebastian Bach and the Sonata for Organ, for Four Hands, in D minor by Gustav Merkel together with his fellow pupil Paul Claußnitzer from Niederschöna, who had also attended Höpner's organ lessons and also received the school-leaving certificate as an organist.

In July 1890, Pittrich took part in a song recital in Schandau. He played at the grand concert the Sonata in A flat major, Op. 110, 1st movement by Beethoven and an Etude in C minor by Chopin, as well as a work composed by himself, a nocturne in F sharp major.

After his musical training, which he completed with distinction, Pittrich obtained a position as répétiteur at the Semper Opera in Dresden in 1890. At theatre rehearsals, he had to accompany the actors by playing the piano instead of the orchestra. Outside of his full-time occupation, the young pianist was temporarily active in 1892 as director or conductor of the Dresden male choral society "Liedergruß" in "Meinholds Säle" with practice hours once a week.

He also filled the position of music teacher at the Saxon Court from 1895 to 1898. In this capacity, George Washington Pittrich was temporarily the teacher of the then Crown Princess at the Saxon Royal Court, Archduchess Louise of Austria.

=== Collaboration in the Tonkünstler-Verein ===
Pittrich joined the Tonkünstler-Verein zu Dresden, founded in 1854, as a pianist and composer after completing his studies at the Hochschule für Musik Carl Maria von Weber in 1890, which also had members from outside. He became acquainted with musical works there that had not been rehearsed before, educated himself by making music together and presented his own compositions. The Fantasy for Pianoforte and String Orchestra, composed by him and at that time only available as a manuscript, was performed by Pittrich for the first time in 1893 at a practice session of the association. Songs composed by him were performed in 1898 with his participation at the piano. As a singer, Ernst Wachter (1872–1931) from the Semperoper in Dresden made himself available to the Tonkünstler-Verein as a singer. As Kapellmeister in Hamburg and Frankfurt, Pittrich is named in the reports on the Tonkünstler-Verein as a foreign member, after he was still listed as répétiteur and composer in the membership directory among the Dresden artists in the reporting year 1897/98.

=== Awards ===
Pittrich was awarded the certificate of maturity as a pianist, composer and conductor by decision of the teaching staff of the Conservatory on 16 March 1890, having already received the certificate as organist the year before. As a composition student from the class of the Conservatoire's teacher Felix Draeseke, he received an award from the Frederick Pudor Foundation in the 1889/90 school year for the sheet music of the Mass in B minor by Johann Sebastian Bach and the music A Midsummer Night's Dream by Felix Mendelssohn Bartholdy to William Shakespeare's eponymous play. He received a prize certificate for excellent performance as a piano player from the piano class of Bertrand Roth.

In 1894, the composer and répétiteur at the Court Theatre was awarded the Royal Saxon Order of Merit, the Albert Order. It was the year in which the opera Marga, composed by Pittrich, was performed in Dresden at the beginning of February and "achieved a complete success".

=== Accident ===
Pittrich was bitten by a poisonous snake on the Baltic Sea near Lohmen on Rügen in August 1894. This caused his hand and arm to swell dangerously up to the armpit. He had to travel to Greifswald, "where a university professor was able to counteract the blood poisoning with effective remedies", the German-language American newspaper the Indiana Tribune reported promptly from Saxony on 23 August about the "Correpetitor der Königl. Hofoper Georg Pittrich" in Dresden. "It would not have taken much for the young artist to meet an untimely end," wrote the Dresden writer and editor Roeder on the accident of Pittrich, then a member of the "Königliche musikalische Kapelle" and a young composer. Philipp Ernst Roeder (1862–1897) also mentioned in the biographical sketch that it was the bite of a viper on the island of Rügen, which the Greifswald University Hospital successfully treated.

A year earlier, Pittrich was introduced to the newspaper readers of the Indiana Tribune as a "young composer" in connection with the announcement of his one-act opera "Mara" presented as the "first new production at the Dresden Court Opera". In doing so, the news from Dresden highlighted the first-class cast, e.g. with the Kammersängerin Therese Müller (1850–1930), called Malten.

At the piano, Pittrich accompanied Dresden singers at out-of-town performances, such as the Royal Saxon Court opera singer Maria Bossenberger (1872–1919) on 29 March 1898 when she performed Lieder in Leipzig as part of the Liszt-Vereinskonzerte.

=== Kapellmeister at several German theatres ===
Following his musical activity as a répétiteur at the Dresden Court Theatre, Pittrich became a conductor at various German theatres, including Hamburg (from 1898), Frankfurt (from 1901) in Dresden at the Central-Theater (from 1904). Pittrich first stood at the conductor's podium in Berlin in 1911, when the operetta Der verbotene Kuss was performed in the ancient Alte Komische Oper Berlin, reported the Berlin journalist Leo Heller (1876–1941). In the spring of 1912, the "Central-Theater" in Dresden hosted the "farewell benefit" in favour of the "long-time popular Kapellmeister", who went "as conductor to Berlin's Wintergarten".

During his time as 1st Kapellmeister at the Berlin Wintergarten theatre and composer, Pittrich lived in the then rural community of Zehlendorf just outside the capital.

From 1914, Pittrich worked in Nuremberg. There, he was Kapellmeister at the Stadttheater from 1922. He also worked as a teacher of role studies at the Nuremberg Conservatory. In Nuremberg, Pittrich called himself by his first names George Washington, as the official address book in Dresden already recorded him by name.

With his Christian name "George Washington", Pittrich became known as a composer in the US as well as in England. The Einwohnerbuch Nürnberg 1928 identifies "G. Pittrich" as a Kapellmeister as well as a conductor, in particular he was active at that time as a "choral director" at the local Alten Stadttheater. Pittrich's birthday coincided with that of the first American President George Washington on 22 February and so it happened that his father Carl Gottlob, later Gottlieb, Pittrich (1831–1908), who at that time was "employed by the American Club", gave him the president's name as his first name.

=== Creations ===
The composer earned his first fee with the commission to create music for Schiller's The Maid of Orleans. The 21-year-old rehearsed his composition with the court orchestra and conducted the orchestra himself when the drama was first performed in Dresden in 1891. The composer dedicated two of his songs, the "Wiegendlied" and the song Mägdlein, nimm dich in Acht to the Royal Saxon Chamber Singer Clementine von Schuch-Proska (1850–1932) which appeared in autumn 1891 and became "immediately popular".

Pittrich wrote music for operas and plays. For example, under the name Georg Pittrich, he composed the music belonging to the plot for the play Das Märchen vom Glück, whereby the right to perform and the sheet music could be obtained from the author, Adele Osterloh through the mediation of E. Pierson's Verlagsbuchhandlung in Dresden and Leipzig. The music critic and writer Friedrich Adolf Geißler (1868–1931) judged Pittrich to be a "highly gifted and energetic Kapellmeister" and referred to his "musically excellent" preparation of the performance of Franz Lehar's operetta Der Mann mit den drei Frauen at the Central-Theater Dresden.

Previously, the music critic Geißler attested to Kapellmeister Pittrich that he had "proved himself as a finely sensitive, secure and spirited conductor in the best possible way", referring to the first performances of Die Dollarprinzessin by Leo Fall and Heinrich Berté's operetta Der kleine Chevalier in Dresden in 1907 by the Zentraltheater. Among the successful compositions of Pittrich's Dresden period was the music for the Christmas fairy tale Die Mäusekönigin or Wie der Wald in die Stadt kam, for which F. A. Geißler wrote the text. The play saw its 25th performance at the Dresden Central Theatre on 4 January 1906. The music critic Ludwig Hartmann (1836–1910) praised Pittrich as a "talented conductor" who "worked discipline and delicacy out of the original vaudeville orchestra" of the Dresden Central Theatre, and he referred to the quality of the conducting of Leo Fall's (1873–1925) operetta The Merry Farmer in 1909.

=== Portrait ===
A portrait of the composer Georg Pittrich was published in the official journal of the Deutscher Bühnenverein Bühne und Welt in 1899/1900.... He is characterised there by Goby Eberhardt as "a talented young musician whose opera Marga met with great acclaim in Dresden." As a young musician, Pittrich – dressed in tailcoat and white dress shirt with black bow tie, resting his left hand on a dresser and touching his waistcoat with his right hand on the pocket watch chain – was portrayed by the Royal Saxon and Royal Prussian court photographer Wilhelm Höffert. A bust portrait of this motif was published in 1896 in the biographical-critical sketches of the Dresden Court Theatre.

Court supplier Höffert advertised with the coats of arms of the Saxon and Prussian ruling houses as well as that of the Prince of Wales on the cabinet photo.

A hip picture of Pittrich, photographed in 1902 by the court photographer Arthur Marx in Frankfurt, has been in the collection of the Stadt- und Universitäts-Bibliothek there since 2003. At that time, Pittrich worked as 2nd Kapellmeister of the united municipal theatres in Frankfurt, especially from 1901 at the opera house. The contemporary Theatre Memorial printed a portrait photo of him and it called the Kapellmeister by his first and family name "Georg Pittrich" while in the address book for 1902 he was entered with the name "Pittrich George W." The portrait in the "Theatre Memorial" shows Pittrich with a moustache in a dark suit, standing in front of a round table while leaning with his right hand on a book lying there. In May 1901, when Pittrich was still working in Hamburg as Kapellmeister, he had a print of the original of the soprano Bianca Bianchi, actually widowed Pollini († 1897), née Bertha Schwarz, (1855–1947) on the occasion of her farewell from the stage with a handwritten dedication on the back.

== Legacy ==
Pittrich died in Nuremberg at the age of 64. As early as 1931, he was listed in his last function as "head of the drama music" and no longer as "choral director" as still in 1930 at the "Vereinigte Städtische Theatern Nürnberg-Fürth". His flat was at Campestraße 4 in the Nuremberg district of Sankt Johannis.

The Nuremberg musicologist Wilhelm Dupont (1905–1992) compiled an index of the composer Pittrich's works between 1890 and 1908.

In an obituary of the Genossenschaft Deutscher BühnenAngehöriger for the dead from the month of March 1934, the editor emphasised with Pittrich that he had made "many friends".

The eldest son of George Washington Pittrich and his wife Else, née König, the actor Fritz Pittrich (born 1904), worked at the Städtische Bühnen Nuremberg as stage manager and actor when G. Pittrich ceased to be chief conductor and Kapellmeister there.

Concert timpani with hand-hammered copper kettles in kettle sizes according to the Pittrich-Dresdner tradition go back to an invention of his father Carl (also Karl) Pittrich, when he was orchestra servant of the court orchestra in Dresden in 1881. Since 1872, Pittrich developed a construction with which the skin tension of the timpani is regulated by pedal steps and not by a crank.

The association STRASSE DER MUSIK, founded in 2009 in Halle (Saale), included Georg Pittrich in the List of Central German Composers' Jubilees ... for the year 2020 on the occasion of his 150th birthday.

The surname Pittrich is the Upper German form of the name Bittrich, Middle High German: büterich and means something like "a bulbous drinking vessel", but was also used as a derisive name for the "well-off".

== Work ==
- Was ihr wollt. Three songs for voice and piano; Opus 4
- Music for the plot of Die blonde Kathrein. Ein Märchenspiel nach Andersen von Richard Voß
- Song Hoffnung, for one singing voice with pianoforte; Opus 18
- Coronation March from The Maid of Orleans
- Schlafe, mein Söhnchen, schlaf bald. Lullaby for Voice and Piano
- Kegelbrüder-Marsch
- Serenade for small orchestra, Opus 21, date of composition around 1899.
- Music for Das Märchen vom Glück, play in four acts, poetry: Adele Osterloh
- Music for Marga, opera in one act, performed in Dresden in 1894 under Ernst von Schuch
- Three Songs for Male Choir, Opus 35: Always stirring, always moving; Mir ist, als ob der Frühling; Du lieber goldner Sonnenschein.
- Trompeterständchen for B-flat trumpet (cornett with piano, Opus. 37.
- Ich hab auf meiner Wanderung. Wanderlied for male voice and piano; Opus 38.
- Barcarole, Opus 41, work for violin with piano accompaniment, first published 1901.
- Abendlied, Opus 42, Deutsche Lokal-Nachricht publication c. 1902
- Pechvogel und Lachtaube. Tanzmärchen nach Texten von Karl Scheidemantel.
- Abendlied for string orchestra. Opus 42
- Alexander March for piano. Opus 60
- Central-Theater-Marsch for piano; date of composition 1905
- Music for the Christmas fairy tale The Mouse Queen c. 1905/06.
- Music for: The Star of Bethlehem. Ein deutsches Weihnachts- und Krippenspiel in vier Bildern by F. A. Geißler c. 1908
- Hussarenfieber, march for orchestra or piano, date of composition 1908
- Beethoven: I invite you to a serious celebration
- Music for Princess Turandot. Subtitled Schaurette nach Carlo Gozzi by Waldfried Burggraf who authored it in 1923.
- Music for the ballet Pechvogel und Lachtaube: pantomimisches Tanzmärchen by Karl Scheidemantel (1859-1923)
