= Richard Gutzschbach =

German operatic baritone (1840–1921)

Richard Gutzschbach, real name Richard Gutzschebauch (1840 – 4 November 1921) was a German operatic baritone.

== Life ==
Gutzschbach was born in Großstorkwitz. According to his parents' wishes, he was to become a teacher and, after completing the relevant studies, worked as such for a long time at the higher citizens' school in Chemnitz.

His voice prompted him to give up teaching and study singing in Dresden at the Hochschule für Musik Carl Maria von Weber Dresden with Professor Gustav Scharfe.

After completing his studies, he was immediately engaged at the Saxon Court Theatre in 1866, where he worked for almost 40 years.

He was considered a great Wagner interpreter.

Gutzschbach died in Dreden in his 80s.
