= Albert Goldberg =

German operatic baritone (1847–1905)

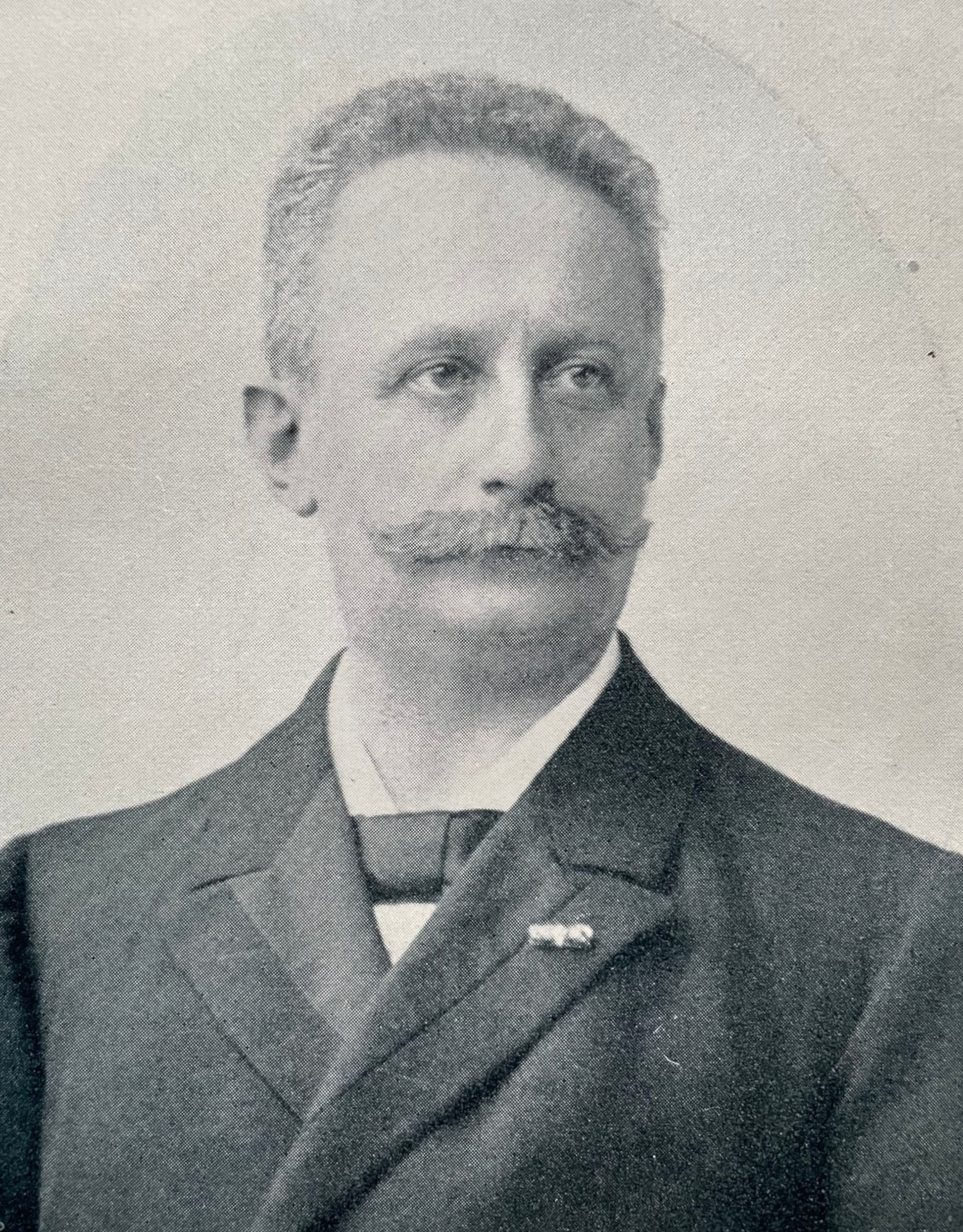
Albert Goldberg

Albert Goldberg (8 June 1847 – 7 November 1905) was a German operatic baritone, opera director and theatre manager.

== Life ==
Goldberg was born in Braunschweig. His parents were Hirsch Goldberg (12 July 1807 in Wolsztyn – 10 June 1893 in Braunschweig), hazzan of the Jewish Community of Braunschweig and his wife Marianne (Golda Miriam), née Rothgießer (31 August 1818 in Wschowa – 5 January 1894 in Leipzig). He had three siblings: Jacques Goldberg (born 16 January 1861 in Braunschweig – 26 September 1934 Berlin), musician, actor, director and theatre manager, Golde Georgine (born 28 May 1850) and Joseph Julius (born 18 April 1856). The theatre director and screenwriter Heinz Goldberg was his nephew.

He wanted to become a musician from his youth, but at the request of his parents he had to devote himself to the merchant's trade. After his apprenticeship in a Schwerin manufacturing business was over and his musical talents became more and more evident, he entered the University of Music and Theatre Leipzig in 1865 to become a bandmaster. However, especially as his voice developed accordingly during this time, he decided to become an opera singer. He made his first attempt on 2 May 1869 at the Court Theatre in Munich as Oberbrahmine in L'Africaine.

From there he found his way to the Stadttheater Main in 1870, to Bremen in 1871, Neustrelitz from 1871 to 1873, Strasbourg in 1874, Augsburg from 1875 to 1876 (in summer Berlin, Krolltheater) from where he was won by director Max Staegemann to the Königsberg Stadttheater. There he worked not only as the first baritone, but also as a director until 1 June 1880 and during this time gained such rich sympathies that he was even given the directorship of the city theatre, which he led for three years to the greatest satisfaction.

On 1 June 1883, he again followed a call from Staegemann, who had in the meantime taken over the Leipzig City Theatre, and accepted the position offered to him as head director of the opera. From this time until his death in Leipzig at the age of 58, he worked at this stage.

Goldberg's pupils included Poldi Gersa and Ernst Wachter.
