= Emil Goetze =

German tenor

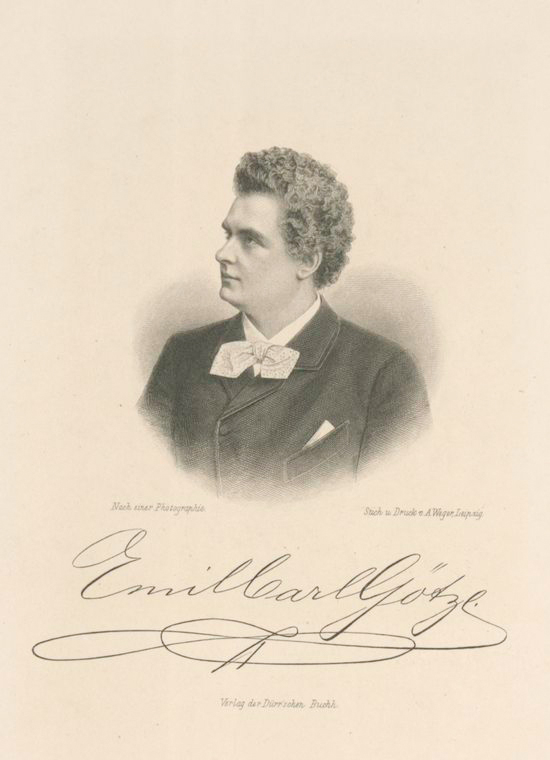
Emil Carl Götze

Emil Karl Goetze, also Emil Götze (19 July 1856 – 28 September 1901), was a German operatic tenor.

== Life ==
Born in Leipzig, Göetze, student of the Dresden conservatory with Gustav Scharfe, where he first appeared on stage in October 1878, was then engaged at the court theatre there for three years, and finally became first tenor at the Stadttheater in Cologne.

Göetze was one of the most celebrated singing artists, who also achieved success in numerous guest roles on the first stages in Germany.

Among his main roles were Walter von Stolzing in Die Meistersinger von Nürnberg, Lohengrin, Faust, the Prophet, Lyonel (Martha), Raoul (Les Huguenots).

He was a member of the Leipzig Masonic lodge Balduin zur Linde.

Götze died in Charlottenburg at the age of 45.
