= Jacques Goldberg =

German musician, actor and theatre director

Jacques Goldberg (16 January 1861 – 26 September 1934) was a German musician, actor and theatre director.

== Life ==
Goldberg was born in Braunschweig. His parents were Hirsch Goldberg (12 July 1807 in Wollstein - 10 June 1893 in Braunschweig), hazzan of the History of the Jews in Braunschweig and his wife Marianne (Golda Miriam), née Rothgießer (31 August 1818 in Fraustadt - 5 January 1894 in Leipzig). He had three siblings: Albert (8 June 1847 in Braunschweig - 1 November 1906 in Leipzig), opera director and singer and conductor, Golde Georgine (28 May 1850) and Joseph Julius (18 April 1856). The theatre director and screenwriter Heinz Goldberg was his nephew.

Goldberg received musical training as a violinist as a child and came to the US at the age of sixteen, playing in the orchestra of Cincinnati and other major cities in North America. Returning from there in 1880, he worked as an actor and later as a director at German-speaking theatres, such as the Hoftheater Coburg-Gotha and the Landestheater Prag. Around 1895, Goldberg was apparently a director at the Estates Theatre in Prague. He also worked at the municipal theatres in Magdeburg, Bremen, Essen, Hamburg, Krefeld and Mainz. In Prague, he directed the stage premiere of Richard Wagner's The Fairies. In 1896, Goldberg was appointed director at the Stadttheater in Szczecin. After the end of his engagement there in 1900, Goldberg first performed Tristan und Isolde at the St. Georges Hall Theatre in London, after which he made a guest appearance at the Theater des Westens in Berlin. Goldberg's other engagements subsequently included stage director at the Metropolitan Opera in 1905/1906, Düsseldorf in 1906, artistic director of the municipal theatre in Colmar in 1907. (Théâtre Municipal de Colmar), in 1910 director and chief director of the Royal Swedish Opera in Stockholm, in 1913 chief director of the Quinlan Opera in London, in 1918-1919 chief director at the Stadttheater am Brausenwerth, and 1919-1920 chief director of the Finnish National Opera and Ballet in Helsinki. His comedy Her Ideal was repeatedly performed.

Goldberg died in Berlin at the age of 73.

== Work ==
- with Wild-Queisner: Ihr Ideal. Lustspiel.

== Awards ==
- Königlich Schwedischer Order of Vasa I. Class.
