= Maria Bossenberger =

German operatic soprano and voice teacher

Maria Bossenberger, also Marie Bossenberger, (30 June 1872 – 10 February 1919) was a German operatic soprano and voice teacher.

== Life ==
Born in Graz, Bossenberger, daughter of the composer Heinrich Bossenberger and his wife Julie Koch-Bossenberger, opera singer, was trained by her father.

At the age of 17, she made her debut on 12 September 1889 as Ännchen in der Freischütz at the Dresden Court Theatre. There, she received a 5-year contract, which was extended for the same period after expiry. The Dresden court opera singer had her main success at a song recital of the Liszt Society in Leipzig on 29 March 1898 when she performed the Loreley by Franz Liszt, the Ständchen by Richard Strauss and the Spielmannslied by Georg Pittrich with piano accompaniment by the composer.

In 1899, she went to the Schauspiel Frankfurt for three years. This was followed by engagements at the Stadttheater am Brausenwerth (1902-1903), at the Stuttgart Court Opera (1903-1904), at the Magdeburg City Theatre (1906-1907), at the Essen City Theatre (1908-1909) and, as the last stop before the end of her stage career in 1910, in Königsberg.

She subsequently worked as a singing teacher in Hanover.

Bossenberger died in Hanover aged 46.
