= Poldi Gersa =

German actress and soprano

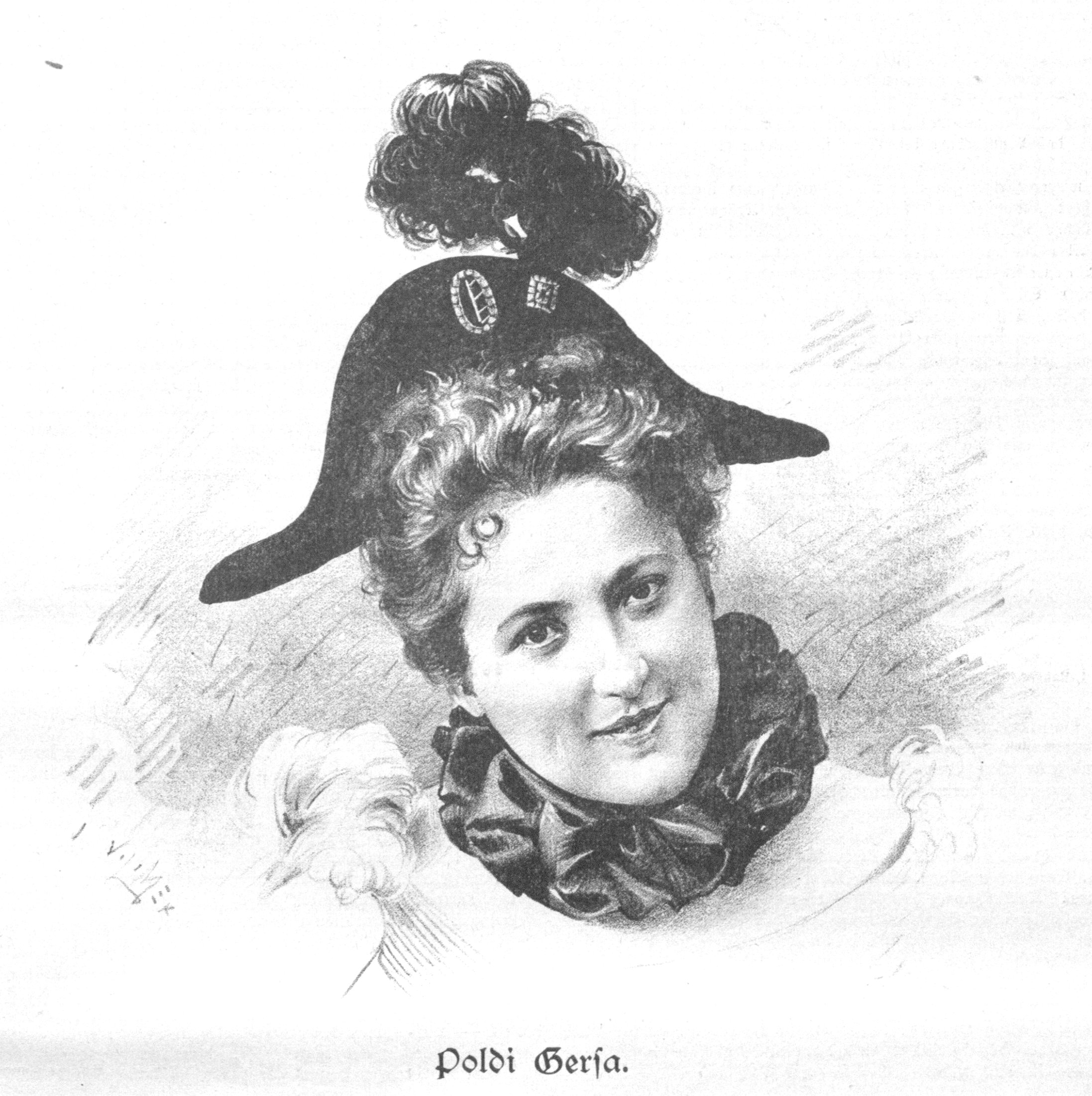
Poldi Gersa in 1896

Poldi Gersa (13 September 1874 in Schwechat – after 1902) was an Austrian soprano and stage actress.

== Life ==
She began her stage training at the age of 17. Her teachers were Anna Schröder-Schalupka in Stettin, Albert Goldberg and Louise Ottomann in Dresden.

Her first engagement was in Stettin (1891-1893), then she was in Leipzig and finally went from there to the Residenztheater in Dresden.

Gersa performed both vocally and playfully, and she is characterised by humour and a healthy, natural wit.

== Roles ==
- Adele in Die Fledermaus
- Fiametta in Boccaccio
- Mizi Schlager in Liebelei
