= Repertory of the Vienna Court Opera under Gustav Mahler =

Opera-related list

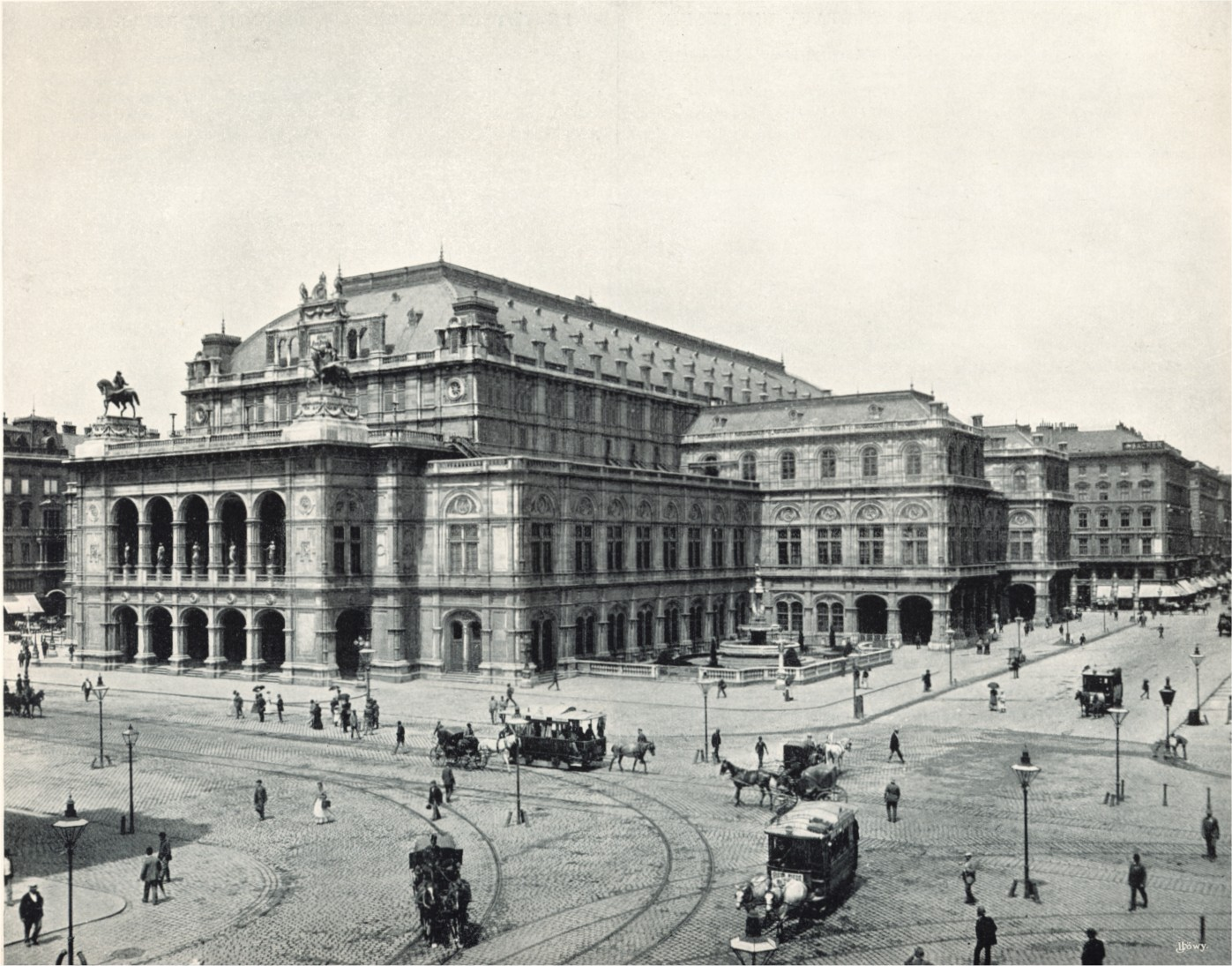
The Vienna Hofoper (now Staatsoper), pictured in 1898 during Mahler's conductorship

The Repertory of the Vienna Court Opera under Gustav Mahler is an account of the ten years during which Gustav Mahler held the office of director and when he directed the productions of more than 100 different operas, of which 33 had not previously been staged at the Hofoper and three were world premieres. Another 55 were presented in either entirely new or substantially revised productions. In all, almost 3,000 performances took place at the Hofoper during Mahler's tenure, of which Mahler conducted more than 600.

Mahler, well known as a symphonic composer, joined the Vienna Court Opera (the Hofoper) in May 1897 as a staff conductor and director-designate, pending confirmation of his appointment as director. After his confirmation in October 1897, he remained in the post until his resignation in November 1907.

Conducting duties were shared among staff conductors whose numbers included at various times Gustav Brecher, Johann Nepomuk Fuchs, Joseph Hellmesberger, Jr., Karl Luze, Hans Richter, Franz Schalk, Francesco Spetrino, Bruno Walter and Alexander Zemlinsky.

At the start of Mahler's tenure, stage designs were under the control of Anton Brioschi, the Hopfoper's official designer since 1886, and his assistant Heinrich Lefler. However, from 1903, new designs were increasingly the work of Alfred Roller, a member of the Secessionist group of artists into which circle Mahler had been introduced by his wife Alma. Roller was appointed to the Hofoper from June 1903; his innovative and experimental stage designs have been called "more remarkable than [Mahler's] additions to the repertoire".

== Operas performed, 1897–1907 ==
=== Performances of existing repertory works ===
The following operas were in the Hofoper repertory when Mahler assumed the directorship in 1897. Each had one or more revivals during the period of Mahler's tenure. Most of these older productions were significantly revised under Mahler; in some instances, entirely new productions of the works were mounted. The list does not included ballets or other entertainments.

Opera title	Composer	Total performances 1897–1907	Notes	Refs
Africaine, L'	Meyerbeer, Giacomo	19		
Aida	Verdi, Giuseppe	84	New production from 11 May 1903	
Am Wörther See	Koschat, Thomas	6		
Ballo in Maschera, Un	Verdi, Giuseppe	29	Revised production from 5 March 1898; Second revision from 19 May 1906	
Barbiere di Siviglia	Rossini, Giaochino	16	Revised production from 25 December 1906	
Bartered Bride, The	Smetana, Bedřich	57	Revised production from 20 September 1899, designed Anton Brioschi	
Carmen	Bizet, Georges	85	Revised production from 26 May 1900, designed Brioschi	
Cavalleria rusticana	Mascagni, Pietro	131		
Cosi fan tutte	Mozart, Wolfgang Amadeus	8	New production from 4 October 1900, designed Brioschi. Second new production from 24 November 1905, designed Alfred Roller	
Dame blanche, La	Boieldieu, François-Adrien	24	Revised production from 4 October 1898	
Don Giovanni	Mozart, Wolfgang Amadeus	25	New production from 21 December 1905, designed Roller	
Dragons de Villars, Les	Maillart, Louis-Aimé	13	Revised production from 21 April 1899	
Entführung aus dem Serail, Die	Mozart, Wolfgang Amadeus	18	New production from 29 January 1906, designed Roller	
Ernani	Verdi, Giuseppe	6	New production from 2 October 1902	
Euryanthe	Weber, Carl Maria von	10	New production from 19 January 1903, designed Roller. Revised production from 19 January 1904	
Evangelimann, Der	Kienzl, Wilhelm	34		
Faust	Gounod, Charles	90		
Fidelio	Beethoven, Ludwig van	45	New production from 4 February 1904, designed Roller	
Fille du régiment, La	Donizetti, Gaetano	4	Revised production from 6 September 1899	
Fledermaus, Die	Strauss, Johann	91		
Fliegende Holländer, Der	Wagner, Richard	55	Revised production from 4 December 1897, designed Brioschi	
Fra Diavolo	Auber, Daniel	14	Revised production from 28 September 1899, designed Brioschi	
Freischütz, Der	Weber, Carl Maria von	43	Revised production from 21 October 1898	
Goldene Kreuz, Das	Brüll, Ignaz	9	Revised production from 6 June 1902	
Götterdämmerung	Wagner, Richard	44	Revised production (uncut version) from 4 September 1898	
Guillaume Tell	Rossini, Gioachino	48	New production from 11 May 1905, designed Brioschi	
Gute Nacht Herr Pantalon	Grisar, Albert	2		
Hamlet	Thomas, Ambroise	2		
Hans Heiling	Marschner, Heinrich	13		
Hänsel und Gretel	Humperdinck, Engelbert	57		
Heimchen am Herd, Das	Goldmark, Karl	20		
Huguenots, Les	Meyerbeer, Giacomo	41	New production from 29 October 1902, designed Brioschi	
Iphigénie en Aulide	Gluck, Christoph Willibald	6	New production from 18 March 1907, designed Roller	
Juive, La	Halévy, Fromental	19	New production from 13 October 1903, designed Brioschi	
Königin von Saba, Die	Goldmark, Karl	51	Revised production from 29 April 1901, designed Brioschi	
Legende der Heilige Elisabeth, Die	Liszt, Franz	10		
Lohengrin	Wagner, Richard	123	New production from 27 February 1906, designed Roller	
Lucia di Lammermoor	Donizetti, Gaetano	21	Revised production from 9 October 1899	
Lustigen Weiber von Windsor, Die	Nicolai, Otto	28	New production from 4 October 1901, designed Brioschi	
Manon	Massenet, Jules	40	Revised production from 26 May 1905, designed Roller	
Martha	Flotow, Friedrich von	7	Revised production from 4 May 1901	
Meistersinger von Nürnberg	Wagner, Richard	82	Revised production (uncut version) from 26 November 1899	
Mignon	Thomas, Ambroise	83		
Muette de Portici, La	Auber, Daniel	5	Revised production from 27 February 1907, designed Roller	
Nachtlager in Granada, Das	Kreutzer, Conradin	6		
Norma	Bellini, Vincenzo	11	Revised production from 24 January 1898	
Nozze di Figaro, Le	Mozart, Wolfgang Amadeus	52	New production from 30 March 1906, designed Roller	
Orphée et Eurydice	Gluck, Christoph Willibald	7		
Otello	Verdi, Giuseppe	9	Revised production from 3 May 1907	
Pagliacci	Leoncavallo, Ruggero	137		
Le postillon de Longjumeau	Adam, Adolphe	5	Revised production from 4 February 1904	
Poupée de Nuremberg, La	Adam, Adolphe	1	Revised production from 24 April 1899	
Prophète, Le	Meyerbeer, Giacomo	21	Revised production from 5 March 1907	
Rheingold, Das	Wagner, Richard	42	New production from 23 January 1905, designed Roller	
Rienzi	Wagner, Richard	27		
Rigoletto	Verdi, Giuseppe	36	Revised production from 20 May 1899	
Robert le diable	Meyerbeer, Giacomo	13	Revised production from 20 March 1898	
Roméo et Juliette	Charles Gounod	14	Revised production from 21 November 1897	
Siegfried	Wagner, Richard	49		
Tannhäuser	Wagner, Richard	89	Revised production (uncut version) from 11 May 1901	
Traviata, La	Verdi, Giuseppe	10		
Tristan und Isolde	Wagner, Richard	45	New production from 21 February 1903, designed Roller	
Trompeter von Säkkingen, Der	Nessler, Victor	17		
Trovatore, Il	Verdi, Giuseppe	48	Revised production from 26 October 1900	
Waffenschmied, Der	Lortzing, Albert	7	Revised production from 4 January 1904, designed Brioschi	
Walküre, Die	Wagner, Richard	50	New production from 4 February 1907	
Werther	Massenet, Jules	7	Revised production from 12 May 1906	
Widerspenstigen Zähmung, Der	Goetz, Hermann	9	New production from 3 November 1906, designed Roller	
Wildschutz	Lortzing, Albert	5	Revised production from 27 January 1900	
Zar und Zimmermann	Lortzing, Albert	28	Revised production from 11 September 1897	
Zauberflöte, Die	Mozart, Wolfgang Amadeus	46	New production from 1 June 1906, designed Roller	

=== New works introduced to the Hofoper under Mahler ===
The following is a chronological list of the 33 new operas introduced to the Hofoper by Mahler.

Hofoper first night	Opera title	Composer	First night conductor	Designer	Total performances 1897–1907	Notes	Refs
4 October 1897	Dalibor	Smetana, Bedřich	Gustav Mahler	Anton Brioschi	23		
19 November 1897	Eugene Onegin	Tchaikovsky, Pyotr Ilyich	Gustav Mahler	Anton Brioschi	20		
22 January 1898	Djamileh	Bizet, Georges	Gustav Mahler		19		
23 February 1898	Bohème, La	Leoncavallo, Ruggero	Gustav Mahler	Anton Brioschi	6		
9 December 1898	Donna Diana	Reznicek, Emil von	Gustav Mahler		7		
17 January 1899	Kriegsgefangene, Die	Goldmark, Karl	Gustav Mahler		6	World premiere	
10 February 1899	Opernprobe, Die	Lortzing, Albert	Gustav Mahler	Anton Brioschi	25		
10 February 1899	Speziale, Lo	Haydn, Joseph	Gustav Mahler	Anton Brioschi	7		
27 March 1899	Der Bärenhäuter	Wagner, Siegfried	Gustav Mahler		20		
23 October 1899	Dämon, Der	Rubinstein, Anton	Gustav Mahler		5		
22 January 1900	Es war einmal	Zemlinsky, Alexander	Gustav Mahler		12	World premiere	
22 March 1900	Iolanta	Tchaikovsky, Pyotr Ilyich	Gustav Mahler	Anton Brioschi and others	9		
16 May 1900	Fedora	Giordano, Umberto	Franz Schalk		3		
13 November 1900	Bundschuh, Der	Reiter, Josef	Gustav Mahler		5		
18 March 1901	Lobetanz	Thuille, Ludwig	Franz Schalk	Anton Brioschi	6		
29 January 1902	Feuersnot	Strauss, Richard	Gustav Mahler	Anton Brioschi	12	Mahler conducted revised production from 5 June 1905	
28 February 1902	Dot Mon, Der	Forster, Josef	Gustav Mahler	Anton Brioschi	11	World premiere	
4 October 1902	Zaide	Mozart, Wolfgang Amadeus	Bruno Walter	Anton Brioschi	3		
9 December 1902	Pique Dame	Tchaikovsky, Pyotr Ilyich	Gustav Mahler	Anton Brioschi	30		
24 March 1903	Louise	Charpentier, Gustave	Gustav Mahler	Anton Brioschi	24		
11 November 1903	Contes d'Hoffman, Les	Jacques Offenbach	Gustav Mahler	Anton Brioschi	108		
25 November 1903	Bohème, La	Puccini, Giacomo	Francesco Spetrino	Anton Brioschi	61		
18 February 1904	Corregidor, Der	Wolf, Hugo	Gustav Mahler	Alfred Roller	7		
3 May 1904	Falstaff	Verdi, Giuseppe	Gustav Mahler	Alfred Roller	13		
14 November 1904	Lakmé	Delibes, Léo	Bruno Walter	Alfred Roller	26		
28 February 1905	Abreise, Die	Albert, Eugen d'	Gustav Mahler		8		
28 February 1905	Das war ich	Blech, Leo	Gustav Mahler		5		
6 May 1905	Rose vom Liebesgarten, Die	Pfitzner, Hans	Gustav Mahler	Alfred Roller	18		
4 October 1905	Donne curiose, Le	Wolf-Ferrari, Ermanno	Gustav Mahler	Alfred Roller	12		
4 October 1906	Juif polonais, Le	Erlanger, Camille	Bruno Walter	Anton Brioschi	3		
28 November 1906	Flauto Solo	Albert, Eugen d'	Franz Schalk	Alfred Roller	4		
11 May 1907	Samson et Dalila	Saint-Saëns, Camille	Bruno Walter	Alfred Roller	7		
31 October 1907	Madama Butterfly	Puccini, Giacomo	Francesco Spetrino	Alfred Roller	14		
