= Emil Naumann =

German composer (1827–1888)

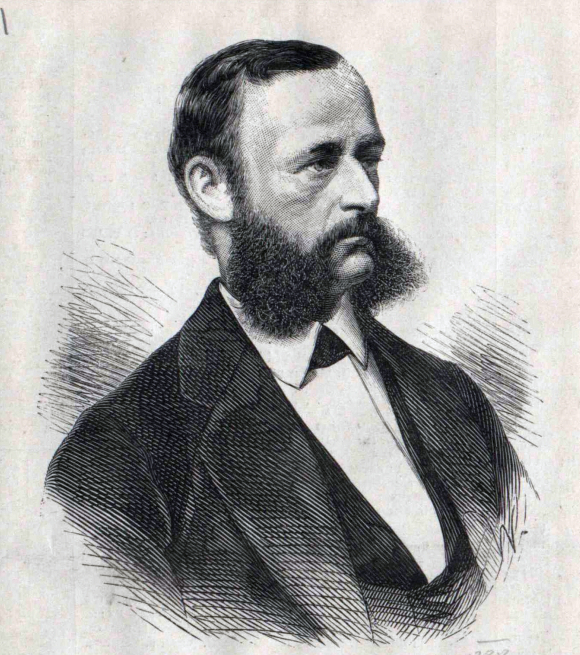
Emil Naumann

Emil Naumann (8 September 1827 – 23 June 1888) was a German composer and church musician.

== Life ==
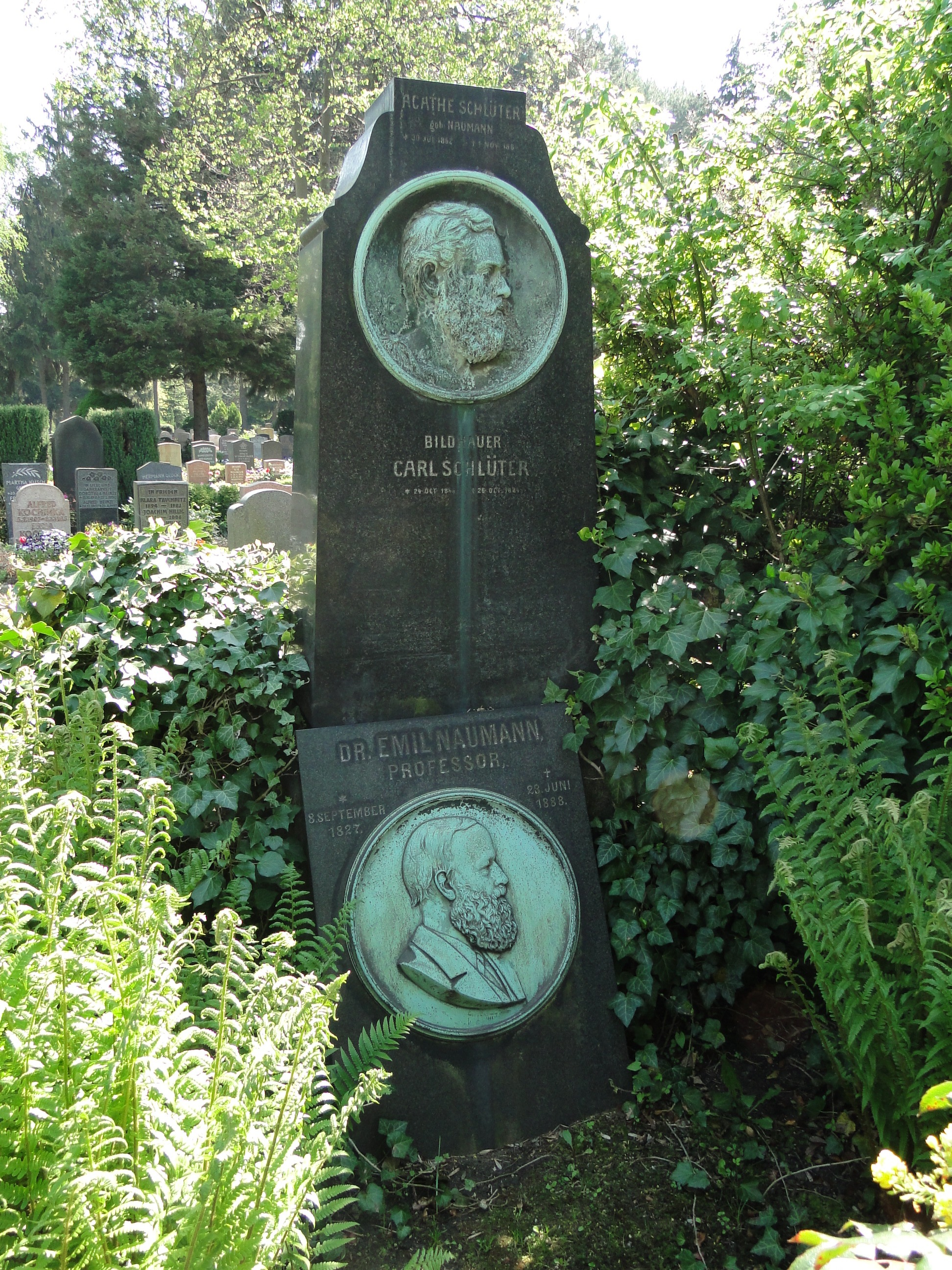
Naumann's grave (front) at Trinitatisfriedhof in Dresden

Born in Berlin, Naumann was the son of the physician Moritz Naumann (1798–1871) and grandson of the Kapellmeister Johann Gottlieb Naumann. His sister was the singer and composer Ida Naumann, née Becker (1832–1897).

After studying music in Frankfurt, he was a pupil of Felix Mendelssohn Bartholdy at the Leipzig Conservatory from 1842 to 1844. In 1850, he succeeded Otto Nicolai as court church music director in Berlin. In this capacity, he published "Über die Einführung des Psalmengesangs in die evangelische Kirche" in 1856. Naumann published three volumes of the "Psalms for all Sundays and Holidays of the Protestant Church Year", commissioned by King Frederick William IV of Prussia for the Staats- und Domchor Berlin. From 1873, he taught at the Hochschule für Musik Carl Maria von Weber Dresden. There, one of his students was Georg Pittrich (1870–1934). Naumann died in 1888 in Dresden at the age of 66 and was buried in the Trinitatisfriedriedhof there.

His writings on music theory also include Die Tonkunst in der Culturgeschichte (2 parts, both 1869) and Illustrierte Musikgeschichte (2 parts, both 1885).

== Work ==
- Illustrirte Musikgeschichte. Die Entwicklung der Tonkunst aus frühesten Anfängen bis auf die Gegenwart von Emil Naumann, K. Professor und Hofkirchenmusikdirektor. Erster Band; Berlin & Stuttgart, Verlag von W. Spemann (foreword of 1885)
- Emil Naumanns Illustrierte Musikgeschichte. Vollständig neubearbeitet und bis auf die Gegenwart fortgeführt von Eugen Schmitz. Einleitung und Vorgeschichte von Leopold Schmidt. 30 Kunst- und 32 Notenbeilagen. 273 Textabbildungen. Neunte Auflage; Union Deutsche Verlagsgesellschaft Stuttgart, Berlin, Leipzig (Vorwort zur 9. Auflage von 1928)

== Choral work ==
- Christus der Friedensbote, Oratorium (premiered in Berlin 1849, Sing-Akademie zu Berlin)
- Der Herr ist König (Psalm 93) op. 18 (Berlin 2003)
- Die Himmel erzählen die Ehre Gottes (Psalm 19) op. 17 for 8-part mixed choir (Berlin 2003)
- Du Hirte Israels, höre (Psalm 80) (Berlin 2003)
- Herr, der du bist vormals gnädig gewesen (Psalm 85) op. 19 (Berlin 2003)
- Herr, unser Herrscher (Psalm 8) (Berlin 2003)
