= Friedrich Plaschke =

20th-century Czech opera singer

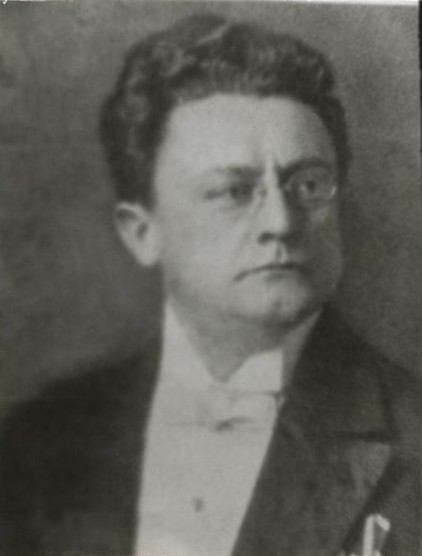
Friedrich Plaschke

Friedrich Plaschke (7 January 1875, Jaroměř – 4 February 1952) was a Czech operatic bass-baritone. From 1900 to 1937 he was a member of the Dresden Hofoper. He also appeared as a guest artist with companies in the United States, the Bayreuth Festival, and at the Royal Opera House in London.

At the Dresden Opera, he appeared in five Richard Strauss premieres: Feuersnot, Salome, Die ägyptische Helena, Die schweigsame Frau, and Arabella. He was married from 1911 to the soprano, Eva von der Osten, who in that year created the role of Octavian in Strauss's Der Rosenkavalier.
