= Rudolf Jäger =

German operatic tenor (1875–1948)

Rudolf Jäger (30 August 1875 – 22 January 1948) was a German operatic tenor and voice teacher.

== Life ==
Born in Dresden, Jäger, son of a master locksmith, first studied law but then attended the Dresden Music School where he was trained by Richard Müller. He was then engaged by the Hofbühne Dresden in 1898. He made his debut in 1899 in the role of the Helmsman in Der fliegende Holländer. In 1899, he sang at the Grillo-Theater Essen, but soon returned to Dresden, where he worked until 1908. Among other roles, he interpreted Narraboth in the world premiere of Richard Strauss' Salome in Dresden in December 1905.

Jäger accepted an engagement at the Leipzig Opera in 1908 and remained there until 1925. In 1925, he had to give up his career for health reasons and then worked as a voice teacher in Dresden. From 1945 he lived in Leipzig where he died in 1948 at the age of 72.
