= Aglaja Orgeni =

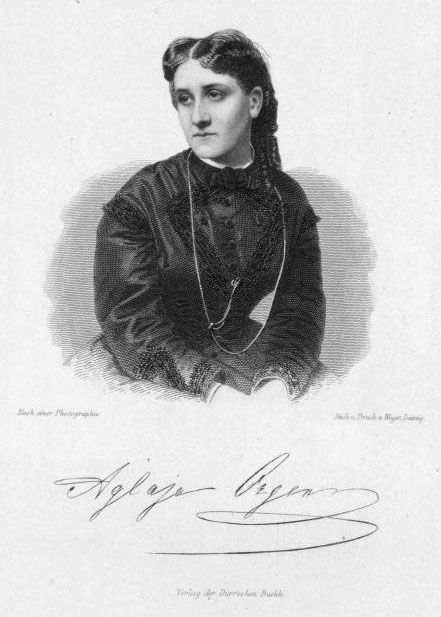
Aglaja Orgeni

Aglaja Orgeni (born Anna Maria von Görger St Jörgen; 17 December 1841 – 15 March 1926), was a Hungarian coloratura soprano.

== Biography ==
Orgeni was born in Rimászombat, Galicia (now Rimavská Sobota, Slovakia). She studied with Pauline Viardot in Baden-Baden and Mathilde Marchesi.

She became a member of the Hofoper Berlin (1865–1866), making her debut as Amina in Bellini's La sonnambula. In 1866, she performed at Covent Garden singing Violetta in Verdi's La traviata and the title roles in Donizetti's Lucia di Lammermoor and Friedrich von Flotow's Martha.

She also appeared in the German cities of Leipzig, Dresden, and Hanover. In 1872 she appeared in Vienna, and in 1873, in Munich where she performed the roles of Leonora in Verdi's Il trovatore, Amina in La sonnambula, and Valentine in Meyerbeer's Les Huguenots. Her repertoire also included Agathe in Weber's Der Freischütz and Marguerite in Gounod's Faust.

Orgeni became a voice teacher at the Dresden Royal Conservatory in 1886. Her students included Maude Fay, Carolyn Ortmann, Margarethe Siems, Helena Stägemann, Erika Wedekind, and Beatrice Gjertsen Bessesen. She eventually was appointed to the rank of Royal Professor, the first woman in Germany to receive that title.

Aglaja Orgeni died in Vienna in 1926, aged 84.

== Sources ==
- Saerchinger, César (1918). International Who's Who in Music and Musical Gazetteer, first edition. New York: Current Literature Publishing.
- Sadie, Stanley, ed. (1992). The New Grove Dictionary of Opera (4 volumes). London: Macmillan. ISBN 978-1-56159-228-9.
