= Erika Wedekind =

German operatic soprano (1868–1944)

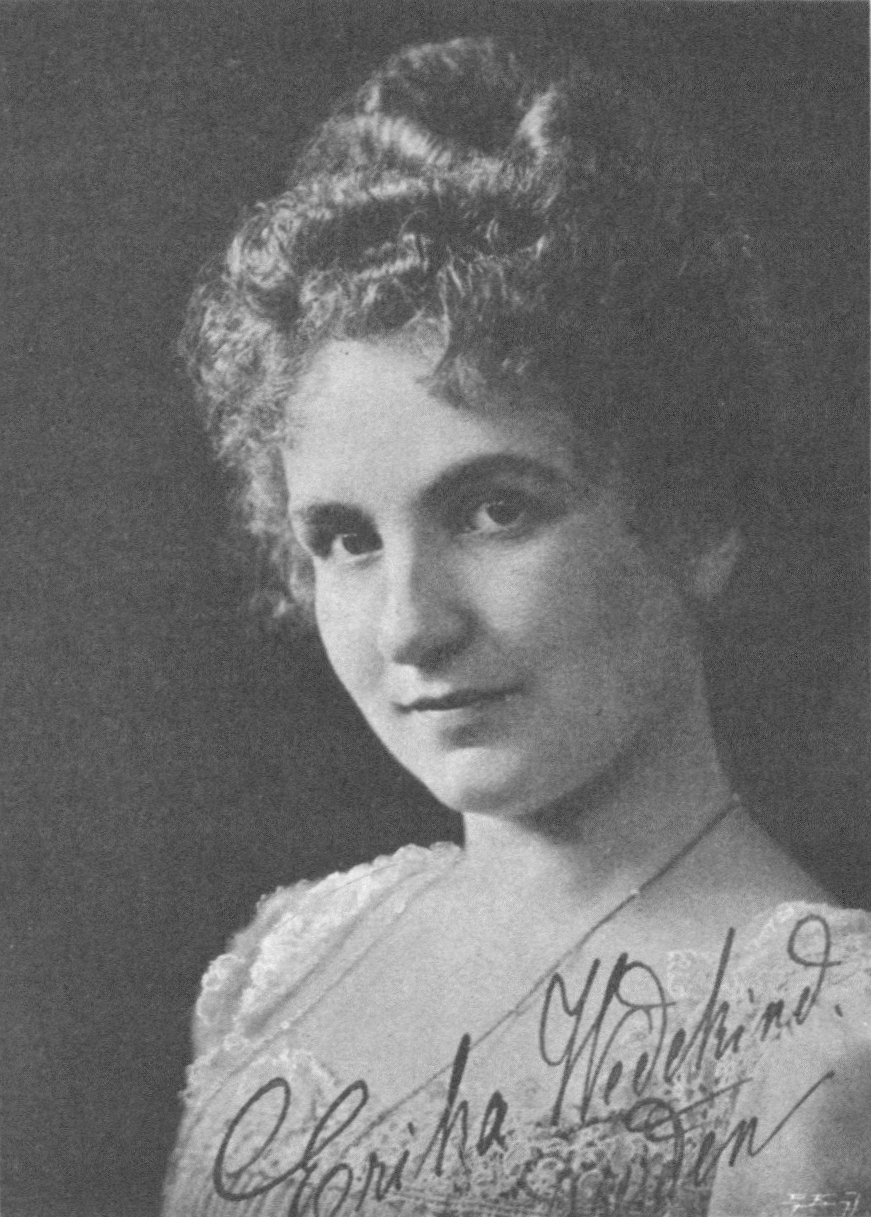
Photograph by Carl Pietzner (1901 at the latest)

Erika Wedekind, complete name Frida Marianne Erica Wedekind, also Erika Oschwald, (13 November 1868 – 10 October 1944) was a German operatic soprano. She came from the Wedekind zur Horst family. Her brothers were the writers Frank Wedekind and Donald Wedekind. She was married since 1898 to the royal privy councillor Walther Oschwald.

== Life and career ==
Born in Hanover, Wedekind grew up at Lenzburg Castle in the Swiss canton of Aargau, which had been purchased by her father, a general practitioner. Although she was celebrated by the local press for her successful stage performances as a young girl in Lenzburg and Aarau, her father refused to allow her to train as a singer and forced her to train as a teacher. It was only after his death that she studied at the Dresdner Konservatorium from 1891 to 1894, initially with Gustav Scharfe (until his death in 1892) and studied singing with the famous soprano and music teacher Aglaja Orgeni.

Wedekind made her debut in 1894 as Frau Fluth in The Merry Wives of Windsor by Otto Nicolai and in the same year received her first engagement at the Dresdner Hofoper, where she was a celebrated coloratura soprano until 1909. Due to her great success, which also took her to international stages, she was given the official title of Royal Saxon Kammersängerin.

Wedekind took part in the 1907 world premiere of the opera Die Schönen von Fogaras by Alfred Grünfeld, as well as in the Dresden premiere of Engelbert Humperdinck's Hänsel und Gretel. After she left the Dresden Court Opera in the same year, performances as a concert singer predominantly followed. Her brothers, the writers Donald and Frank Wedekind, who had no professional success at the time, received occasional financial support from her sister.

Wedekind was one of the first female coloratura sopranos in Germany and an outstanding representative of her field. She gave more than a thousand performances in Germany, Prague, Moscow, Saint Petersburg, Budapest, Stockholm, Paris and London before becoming an internationally sought-after singing teacher between 1914 and 1930. From 1930 she lived in seclusion in Switzerland, where she died in Zürich in 1944 at the age of 75.

== Awards ==
In 1909 she was awarded the civic gold medal Bene merentibus (to the well deserving) by the Ministry of the Royal House of Saxony for her achievements. She held the Orden für Kunst und Wissenschaft of the Grand Duchy of Mecklenburg-Strelitz.

- Königlich-sächsische Kammersängerin in Dresden
- Grossherzoglich-hessische Kammersängerin in Wiesbaden
