= Karl Scheidemantel =

German baritone and opera director

Karl Scheidemantel (29 January 1859 – 26 June 1923) was a German baritone singer, and later an opera director.

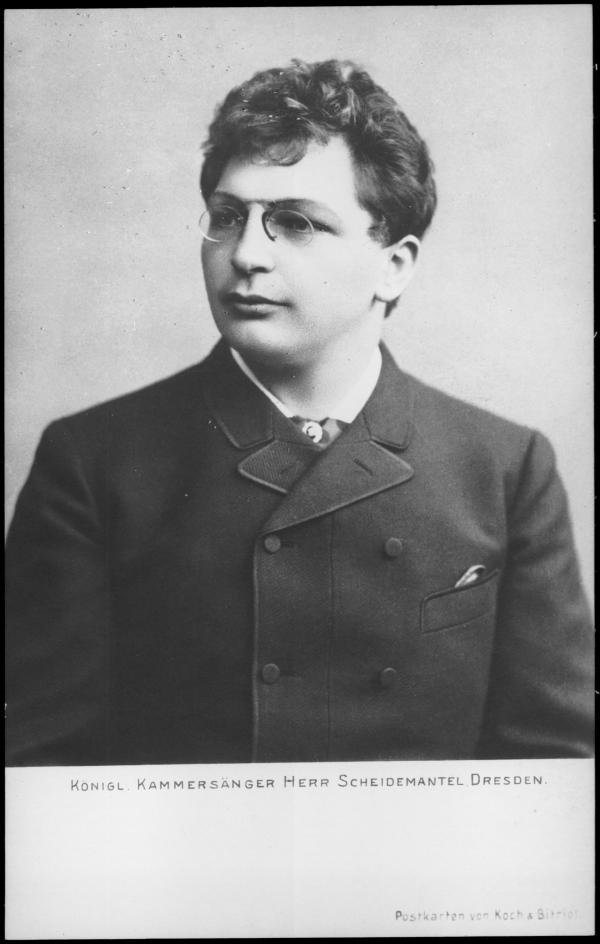
Karl Scheidemantel

== Life and career ==
Born in Weimar, the son of a Weimar court artist, Scheidemantel found great success in various roles in the operas of Richard Wagner. Among his supporters were Bodo Borchers in Weimar, well known voice teacher Julius Stockhausen in Frankfurt, and composer Franz Liszt. At the age of 25, he joined the ensemble of the Dresden Hofoper where he was named Kammersänger, "Chamber Singer to the Saxon Grand Duke" in 1884. He sang at the 1886, 1888, 1891, and 1892 Bayreuth festivals. He frequently corresponded with Cosima Wagner about the happenings of the stage. He then sang at most of the great European opera houses, especially the Vienna State Opera, where in April and May 1890 he sang the rolls of Heiling, Renato, Zampa, Wolfram, Luna and, Sachs. He was a guest singer at La Scala in 1892. His closest friend was singer Karl Perron. He married Hedwig Lehnert in June 1897 at the Dresden Annankirche. His final career appearance was on 8 June 1911 as Hans Sachs.

Scheidemantel sang over 170 roles in his career. Notably, he created the role of Herr von Faninal in Richard Strauss's Der Rosenkavalier in 1911. His German singing translation of Mozart's Don Giovanni was widely used. It was first used in his own new production at Dresden in June 1914, in which Richard Tauber first sang Don Ottavio. He also edited a song anthology for music publisher Eulenberg.

After his stage career he returned to Weimar where he taught singing. His students included Hermann Uhde and Herbert Heyner. He returned to Dresden as director of the Dresden Opera in from 1920-1922. Scheidemantel is buried in Dresden-Tolkewitz. Dresden named a road in his honor.

== Publications ==
- Scheidemantel, Karl (Herausgeber): Meisterweisen, Lieder und Gesänge aus alter und neuer Zeit, Ernst Eulenburg Leipzig, 1913, 2 vol.
- Scheidemantel, Karl: Stimmbildung.
- Scheidemantel, Karl: Gesangbildung.
- He translated Mozarts Don Giovanni.
- Pechvogel und Lachtaube, text Karl Scheidemantel, music Georg Pittrich.

== Literature ==
- Paul Trede: Karl Scheidemantel, Carl Reißner, Dresden 1911.
