= Irene von Chavanne =

Austrian opera singer

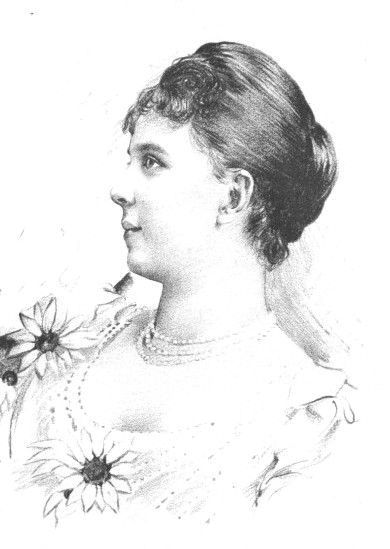
Irene von Chavanne in 1890 by Jan Vilímek

Irene von Chavanne (18 April 1863 – 26 December 1938) was an Austrian operatic contralto.

== Life ==
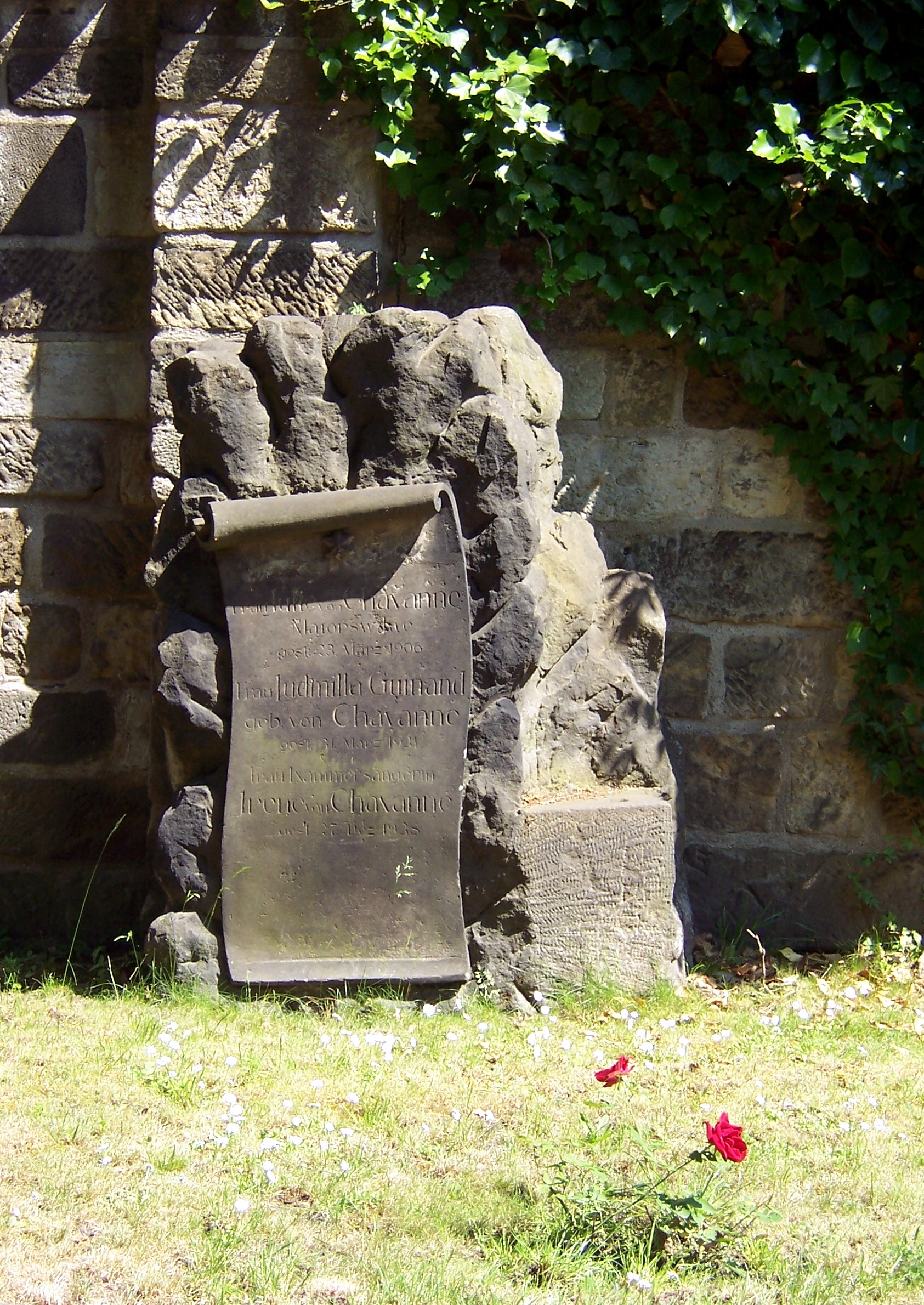
Grave of Irene von Chavanne

Chavanne, born in Graz as a daughter of the retired Imperial-Royal Major Joseph Ludwig Edler von Chavanne (1806–1887) from his second marriage in Graz on 5 July 1862 to Juliana Edlen von Krisch (1831–1903), was actually supposed to become a pianist, but her piano teacher Wilhelm Mayer discovered her vocal gifts and advised her to study singing.

Thereupon she received her education, financed by Empress Elisabeth of Austria, at the Conservatory of the Gesellschaft der Musikfreunde in Vienna with Johannes Ress. She then studied in Paris with Désirée Artôt de Padilla and in Dresden with Adeline de Paschalis Souvestre. She made her debut in April 1885 at the Königliche Oper von Dresden, where she sang until the end of her career in 1915. She was also named an honorary member of the opera.

On 9 December 1905 she sang the role of Herodias in the world premiere of Salome by Richard Strauss. She also took over singing the role of Clytemnestra in Strauss' Elektra, since Ernestine Schumann-Heink, the role's creator, dropped out after the first performance. Other roles included Adriano (Rienzi), Amneris (Aida), Fidès (Le prophète), Azucena (Il trovatore) and Dalila (Samson and Delilah).

She died in Dresden in 1938 at the age of 75. Her grave is located in the Old Catholic Cemetery in Dresden.
