= August Bungert =

German opera composer and poet

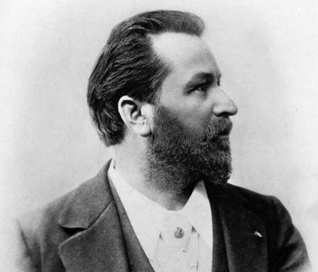
August Bungert

Friedrich August Bungert (14 March 1845 – 26 October 1915) was a German opera composer and poet.

== Biography ==
=== Early life ===
Bungert was born in Mülheim. His unusual musical talent was noticed and nurtured at high school by his teacher, Heinrich Kufferath, the brother of the composer Ferdinand Kufferath. Bungert's father, a wealthy merchant and an eminent member of the community, was unenthusiastic about his son's ambitions and considered his son's musical ability to be an "ill-fated inclination". He would have preferred his son to undertake a career as a merchant or a doctor. Only his mother supported him, but she died when August Bungert was ten. In the aftermath of her death, the conflict between father and son became more intense.

Upon finishing high school at 16, Bungert fled to Cologne. He attended the Conservatorium there and was taught by Ferdinand Kufferath, his high school teacher's brother. In Cologne, he was discovered by the composer Max Bruch's sister, who had been charged by the Paris Conservatorium with finding a talented musician to be educated in Paris.

Without hesitation, I agreed. Before 1866, Paris was a cultural centre, which every aspiring musician must visit in order to gain recognition

— August Bungert, Der Bund - monthly publication for the Bungert-Bund 9 July 1915

=== Musical career ===
Bungert was destitute in Paris, just managing to make ends meet by giving piano lessons, until his father grudgingly gave him a little emergency support. Although the Paris Conservatorium was home to some celebrated musicians, such as Berlioz, Auber and Rossini, who occasionally noticed talented students, Bungert did not receive the encouragement he expected. Due in part to this disappointment, and in part to an unhappy love affair, he returned to Germany. In 1869 he took a position as a chorus-master, and in 1870 as the director of an orchestra in Bad Kreuznach. Although he composed more in Kreuznach - the production of his piece Hutten und Sickingen during the unveiling of a monument was a big success - he was obviously not satisfied.

In 1874 he moved to Berlin, where he continued his studies under Friedrich Kiel. Here he produced more significant works, among others the Piano Quartet in E flat major, opus 18, which was awarded the Florentine Quartet Prize of 1877 by Johannes Brahms and Robert Volkmann who were the judges of the competition. According to Bungert, he composed the piece as he lay in bed feverish with appendicitis. The piano quartet was performed very successfully in Constantinople (now Istanbul) in 1913.

Bungert travelled to Italy with the prize money, ostensibly for health reasons, but probably from a deep yearning for Italian life, moving to Pegli, near Genoa. Here he met Giuseppe Verdi, and his neighbour was the philosopher Friedrich Nietzsche, with whom he would form a strong friendship. In Pegli he wrote the opera Aurora, which premiered in Leipzig in 1884.

=== Carmen Sylva and Leutesdorf ===
In Italy, Bungert made the acquaintance of the Queen of Romania, Elisabeth of Wied, known artistically as Carmen Sylva, who would become of great importance in his later life and for his music. Through Sylva he finally gained the yearned-for access to the highest nobility. Bungert was a regular guest in the royal Wied castles and in the Swedish and Rumanian royal courts.

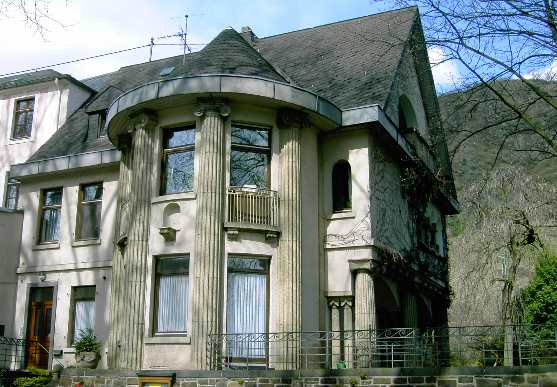
August-Bungert-Haus in Leutesdorf

In 1890, Sylva gave him an expensive Bechstein grand piano, and in 1894 she transferred the ownership of a house to him. The house was situated on the Rhine in Leutesdorf, had a large garden and was renovated by the Cologne architect Carl Schauppmeyer in the Ionic style. The villa is still considered an adornment in the plane-tree-lined Rheinallee (today August-Bungert-Allee). Bungert furnished the house with expensive furniture, works of art and memorabilia. He celebrated his greatest artistic triumphs during this time, especially with the setting of Sylva's poetry to music and his Rhine-songs, which he often composed sitting at his regular table in the Rhine garden of the Leyscher Hof Hotel in Leutesdorf, for which he mostly wrote the texts himself.

Sylva founded an organization called the Bungert-Bund to promote his music. Apart from a comic opera called Die Studenten von Salamanca (The Students of Salamanca), he concentrated on two epic tetralogies based on the Iliad and the Odyssey entitled Homerische Welt (The Homeric World). The first part, The Iliad (unfinished), was divided into Achilles and Clytemnestra (with three further sections planned). The second part, which was completed and performed in Dresden between 1898 and 1903, was The Odyssey, which was divided into Circe, Nausicaa, Odysseus' Return and Odysseus' Death, and was performed more than 100 times in the rest of Europe.

During this time, Bungert was considered to be the antithesis of Wagner - Wagner's works drew themes from Norse mythology, while Bungert's libretti were influenced by the Greek classics. Bungert was strongly influenced by Wagner, and planned to build a Bayreuth-style theatre in Bad Godesberg.

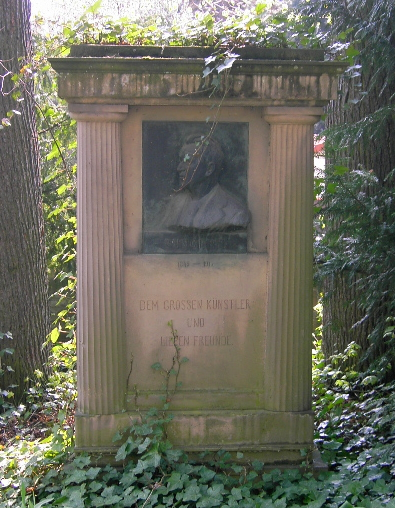
August Bungert's tomb

=== Final years ===
Bungert was awarded a professorship at the Leipzig University in 1911 and gave several lectures about his work there. In 1912, the then sophisticated spa town Wiesbaden started a Bungert-Festival which engendered much interest.

August Bungert died, following a long illness, on 26 October 1915 in his house in Leutesdorf. As a Lutheran Christian he was not permitted (according to his own wishes) to be buried in the cemetery in staunchly Catholic Leutesdorf. His grave is in the cemetery of the Feldkirche in Neuwied. (The Bungert house in Leutesdorf is currently a private residence and not open to the public.)

His list of works includes 362 songs, many of which were based on texts by Carmen Sylva, while he wrote most of the words to his Rhine-songs himself. His greatest work was the operatic tetralogy "Die Homerische Welt" (The Homeric World), inspired by Wagner's Der Ring des Nibelungen. After two world wars, his music was almost forgotten, especially during the Nazi era, in which it was overshadowed by Wagner's works. Today his music is very seldom played.

== Works ==
- Aurora (other titles: Liebe Siegerin / Die Studenten von Salamanka – Dear Victrix / The Students of Salamanca), Musik-Lustspiel (Musical Game), op. 23, premiered in Leipzig 1884, libretto by Hermann Graeff
- Hutten und Sickingen (dramatisches Festspiel für das deutsche Volk – dramatic pageant for the German people), musical drama in pageant form in five acts, op. 40, premiered in Bad Kreuznach 1889, libretto by August Bungert
- Homerische Welt (Homeric World - other title: Die Odyssee - The Odyssey) opera-tetralogy, op. 30, libretto by August Bungert
  - Part I: Circe, musical tragedy in three acts, op. 30/1, premiered 1898 in the Dresden Court Opera (Hofoper)
  - Part II: Nausicaa, musical tragedy in three acts, op. 30/2, premiered 1901 in the Dresden Court Opera
  - Part III: Odysseus' Return, musical tragedy in three acts, op. 30/3, premiered 1896 in the Dresden Court Opera
  - Part IV: Odysseus' Death, musical tragedy in three acts, op. 30/4, premiered 1903 in the Dresden Court Opera
- Sinfonia Vietrix, symphony in four movements for orchestra, chorus and solo voices, op. 70
- Torquato Tasso, symphonic overture for large orchestra, op.14, based on the drama of the same name by Johann Wolfgang von Goethe
- Auf der Wartburg (At the Wartburg Castle), symphonic poem for large orchestra, op.29
- Neue Volks- und Handwerkerlieder in drei Bänden mit Klavierbegleitung (New Folk- and Craftsmanssongs in three volumes with piano accompaniment), op. 49, three-volume song collection for accompaniment by piano, based on texts by Carmen Sylva, Joseph von Eichendorff, Theodor Storm and others, created between 1890 and 1894
- Faust 1 und 2, stage music for the production of Faust for the Goethe-Festival (Goethefestspiele) in 1903 in Düsseldorf, op.58
- Mysterium, oratorio based on texts from the Bible, op. 60, premiered 1909 in Neuwied, published the same year
- Genius Triumphans (Zeppelins große Fahrt) (Triumphant Genius (The Zeppelin's Great Voyage)), symphony, op. 71, performed in honour of the first flight of a Zeppelin.

== Bibliography ==
- Max Chop: August Bungert. Stahl, Berlin 1915 (biography with a catalogue of his works)
- Christoph Hust: August Bungert. Ein Komponist im Deutschen Kaiserreich, Verlag Schneider, Tutzing 2005, ISBN 3-7952-1131-X (August Bungert: A Composer in the German Empire)
- Hildegard E. Schmidt: August Bungert und seine Beziehung zu Carmen Sylva. Neuwieder Verlagsgesellschaft, Neuwied 1995 ("August Bungert and his relationship with Carmen Sylva")
