= Tsvetayev =

Tsvetayev or Tsvetaev (Russian: Цветаев) is a Russian masculine surname, its feminine counterpart is Tsvetayeva or Tsvetaeva. Notable people with the surname include:

- Ivan Tsvetaev (1847–1913), Russian art historian, archaeologist and Classical philologist
- Marina Tsvetaeva (1892–1941), Russian poet
- Anastasia Tsvetayeva (1894—1993), Russian writer and poet
- Vyacheslav Tsvetayev (1893–1950), Soviet general and Hero of the Soviet Union.
