= Yingst =

Yingst is a surname. According to the Dictionary of American Family Names (Oxford University Press, 2013), it is an Americanized form of the German surname Jüngst which means "youngest". The name is mostly of Pennsylvania German origin.

Notable people with the surname include:

- Doug Yingst, American ice hockey executive
- Maynard Yingst (1949–1993), American car racer
- Trey Yingst (born 1993), American journalist
