= Grete Beier =

German female murderer

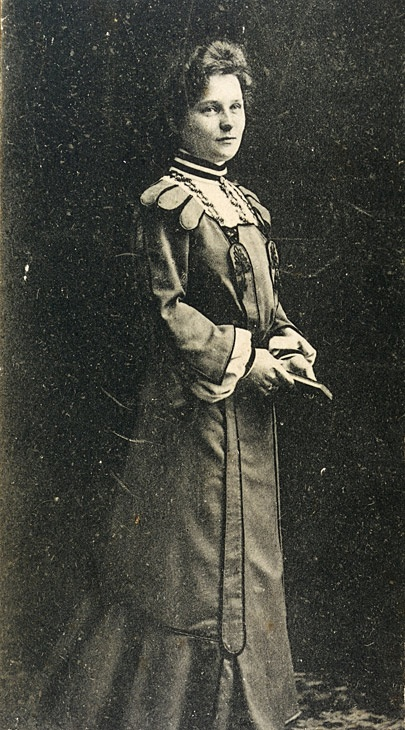
Grete Beier

Grete Beier (15 September 1885 – 23 July 1908) was the last woman who was publicly executed in the Kingdom of Saxony. Her inter-related crimes included fraud, abortion, conspiracy to commit the murder of a witness, and the actual murder of her formal fiancé.

== Biography ==
Marie Margarethe (nickname, Grete) Beier was born on 15 September 1885 in Brand-Erbisdorf. She was the daughter of Brander Mayor Ernst Theodor Beier and his wife Ida Karoline, née Clausnitzer.

In 1905, she met the clerk Johannes Heinrich Merker and secretly became engaged to him without the knowledge of her parents. After she broke off the relationship with him because of his infidelity, she met, in 1906, the chief engineer Heinrich Moritz Curt Pressler. They became engaged at the request of his parents. Beier's relationship with Pressler was always cool, and because of his domineering nature, there soon arose a dispute between the two. She then secretly reconnected with Merker, who had become an embezzler. From this relationship, in the summer of 1906, she became pregnant and had an abortion in November 1906.

Pressler planned a wedding for 14 May 1907. Beier tried to prevent it. Merker tried, too, creating fake love letters to a non-existent Italian named Ferroni, sending these to Pressler.

After the April 1907 death of Kröner, a relative who was the administrator of the poorhouse in Freiberg, Beier falsified his will, stole jewellery and a checkbook from her parents' house, took Kröner's savings, and shared the money with Merker. At the same time, a reader request for the design of a will to appoint the bride as sole heir was answered and reprinted in a Freiberger newspaper. A few days later, Beier set up a fake testament to her groom and poisoned him with cyanide on the eve of the planned wedding in Chemnitz. She then shot him with a revolver in the mouth to simulate his suicide. Immediately after the act, she sent more letters to Ferroni to make the suicide appear believable.

In May 1907, the theft from the parents' house was detected. In the course of the investigation, Beier created other falsifications and lies to direct the suspicion to others. After her arrest in June 1907, an illegal abortion trial was also initiated. Shortly after, Merker was also arrested. In November of that year, Beier confessed to the murder of Pressler. She was found guilty and sentenced to death.

== Execution ==
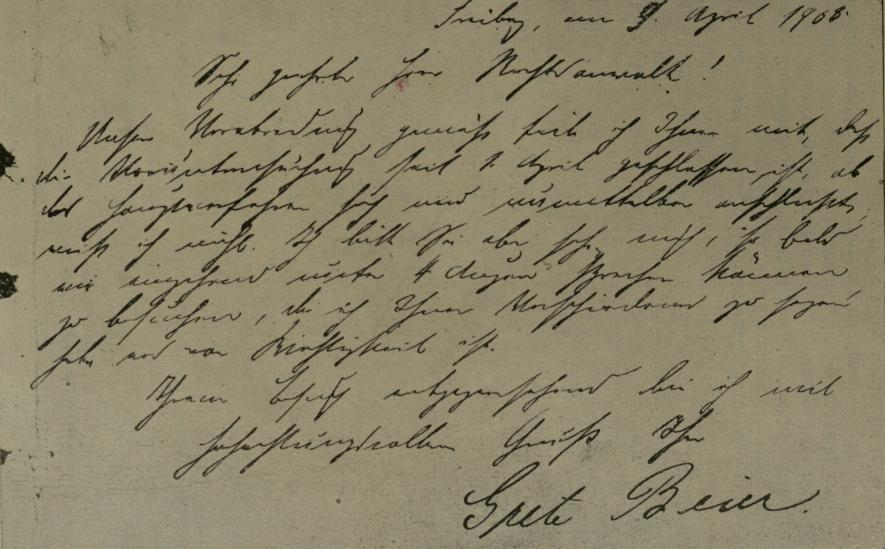
1908 Grete Beier letter

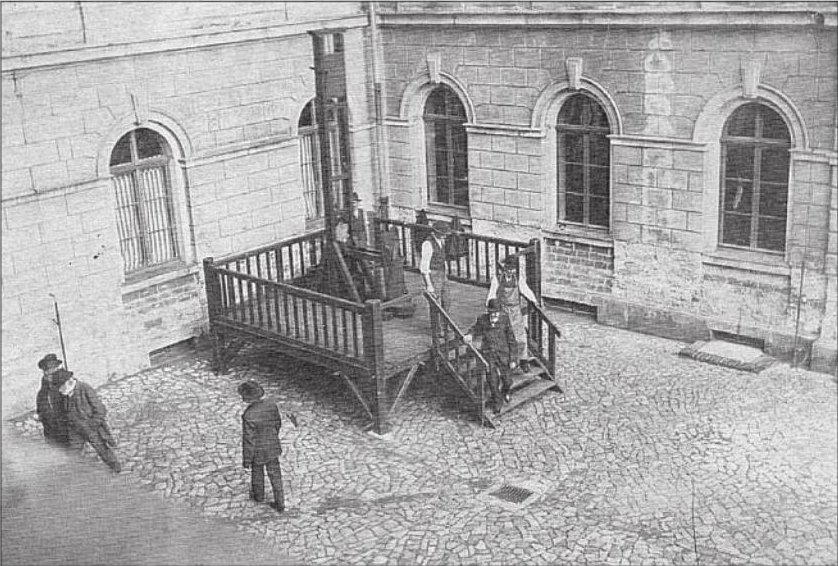
Grete Beier's guillotine

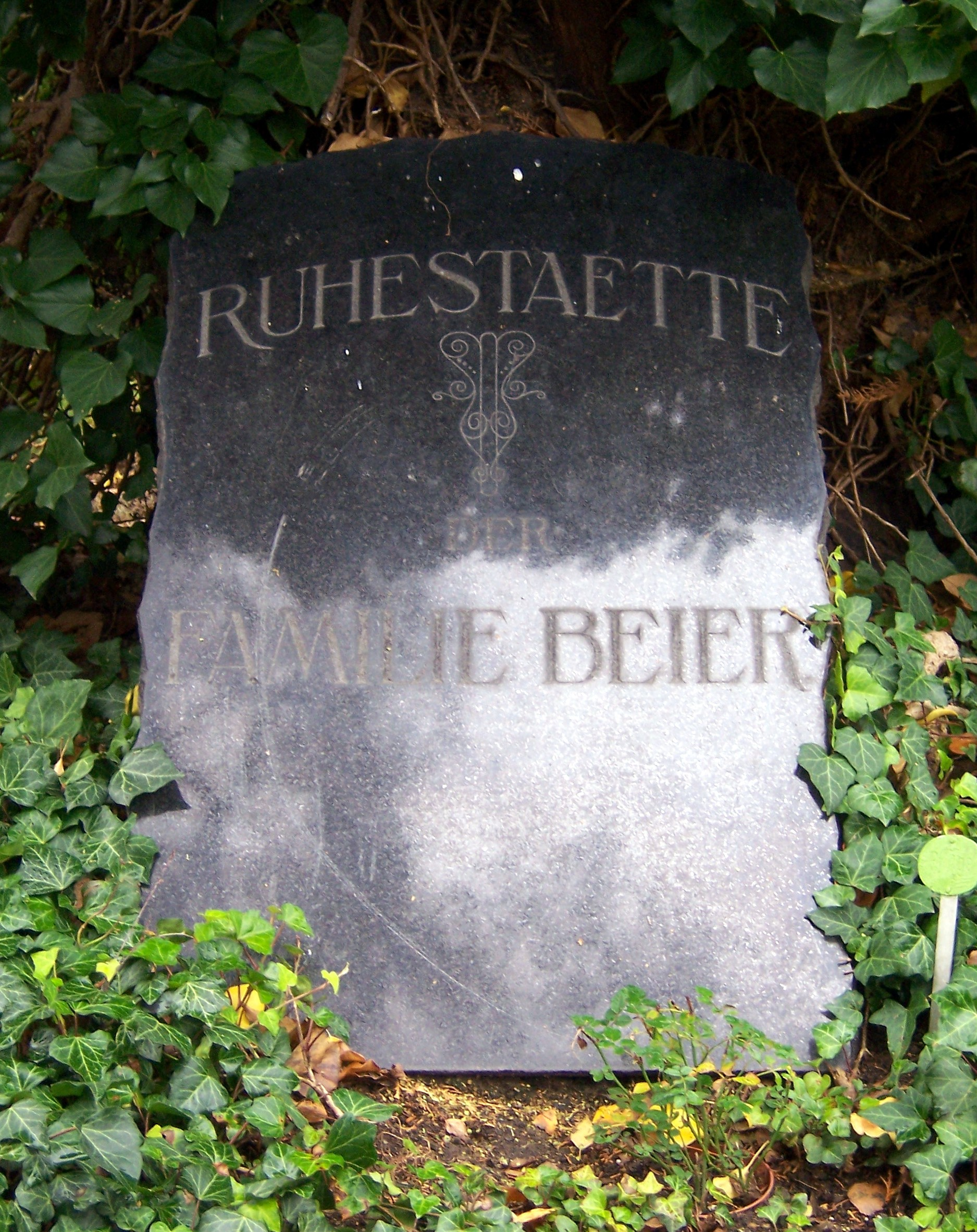
Grete Beier's headstone in Dresden

After a petition for mercy was rejected by the king, Beier was guillotined on 23 July 1908 at the age of 22 years by the state executioner, Moritz Brand, on the scaffold in the courtyard of the district court at the Albert Park in Freiberg. She was buried in the family grave in the Johannis cemetery in Dresden.

An account of the event was published by the Missouri State Medical Association, quoting the Kansas City Star:— “Freiberg, Saxony, July 22, 1908. Grete Beier, the 18-year-old [sic] daughter of the mayor of Freiberg, was beheaded last night in punishment for the murder of the man to whom she was engaged to be married. The executioner of this young woman reached the city last night. He carried a thin, long box containing the ax with which he did his work and also brought with him a hand-bag with a suit of evening clothes. The wearing of this garb is an official requirement of the somber occasion. The preparations for the execution of the death sentence at the prison had been completed and the man did his work quickly and privately and departed from Freiberg as quietly as he came. The executioner is an anonymous person sent here from Dresden on the announcement that the king of Saxony had refused to pardon Grete Beier for her crime."

== Literature ==
Scientific

- Gotthold Leistner: Sachsen und die Guillotine. Ein Beitrag zur Geschichte eines Tötungsmonstrums. In: Sächsische Heimatblätter, 48. Jg. (2002) S. 130–149. (in German)

Contemporary

- Schwurgerichtsverhandlung gegen die Bürgermeisterstochter Grete Beier aus Brand bei Freiberg vor dem Königl. Schwurgericht Freiberg angeklagt der hinterlistigen Ermordung ihres Bräutigams des Ingenieurs Preßler. Hager, Chemnitz 1908 (Digitalisat) (in German)

Literary

- Günter Spranger: Das Lügenspiel. Der Kriminalfall Grete Beier. Greifenverlag, Rudolstadt 1980 (in German)
- Katrin Lange: Ich, Grete Beier, Mörderin. (Theaterstück), Uraufführung: 22. August 2008 Mittelsächsisches Theater Freiberg und Döbeln (in German)
- The case of Grete Beier is mentioned in Guntram Vespers' novel Frohburg (Preis der Leipziger Buchmesse 2015). (in German)
- Kathrin Hanke, Die Giftmörderin Grete Beier, Gmeiner Verlag, Meßkirch 2017 (in German)

Media

- Already in 1908 the case of Grete Beier was made into a film by Gustav Schönwald under the name of Im Irrwege der Liebe. (in German)
- The German broadcasting station Mitteldeutscher Rundfunk discussed the case in an episode aired on 7 January 2008 as part of the documentary series „Die Spur der Ahnen“. (in German)
