= Johannisfriedhof, Dresden =

Historic landmark cemetery in Dresden

Johannisfriedhof
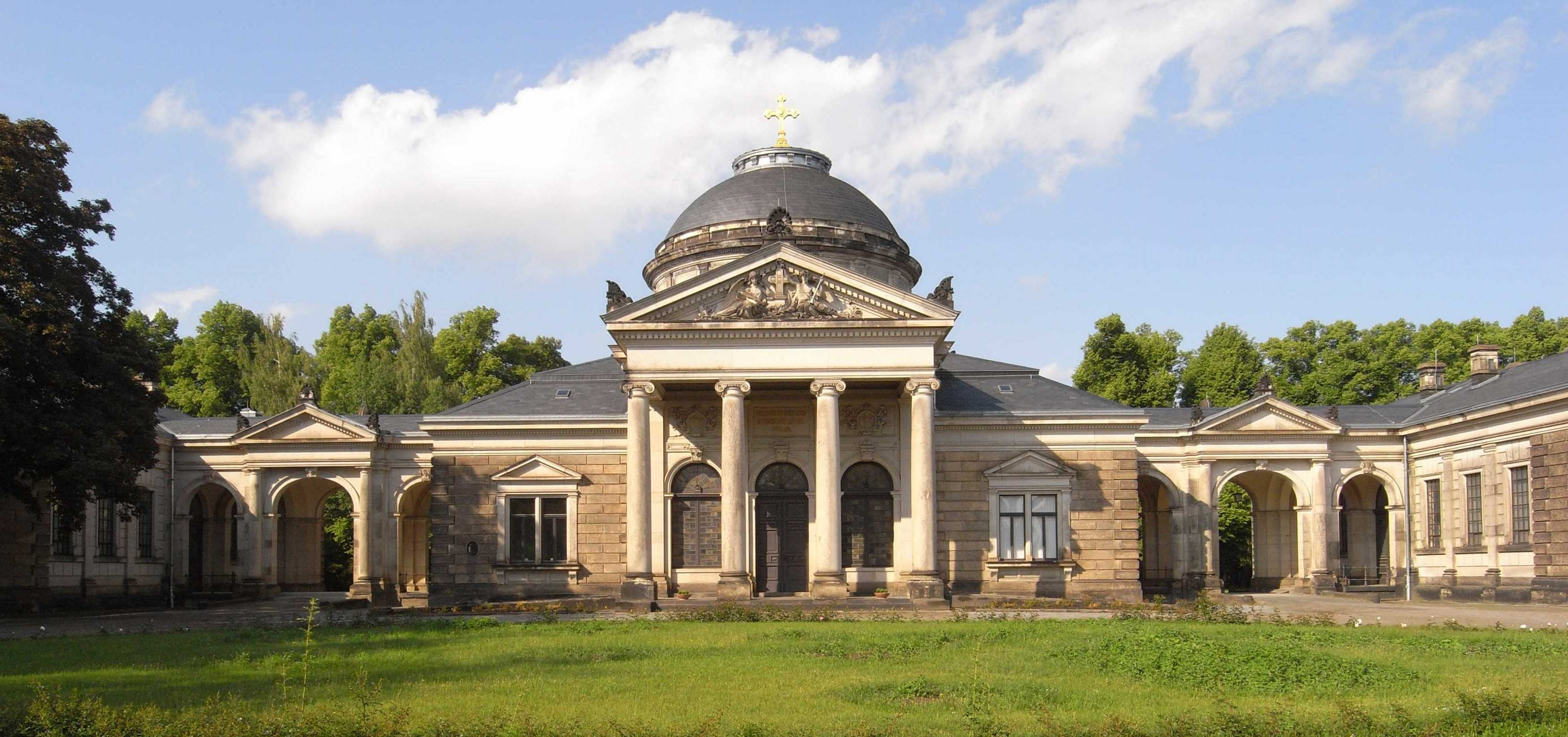
- The chapel of rest built by Paul Wallot in 1894

Details
- Established: 1881
- Location: Dresden
- Country: Germany
- Coordinates: 51°02′18″N 13°48′58″E
- Type: Protestant cemetery
- Owned by: Evangelical-Lutheran Church of Saxony
- Size: 24.6 ha
- Website: The official website

St. John's Cemetery (German: Johannisfriedhof) ) is the second cemetery of the same name in Dresden, Saxony, Germany. It is located in the Tolkewitz district of the city. With its 24.6 hectares, the Evangelical Lutheran Johannisfriedhof was the largest cemetery in Dresden until the municipal non-denominational Heidefriedhof was established in 1934.

== History and description ==
The old burial ground of St. John's was inaugurated in 1575 and had to be expanded in 1633, 1680 and 1721 due to plague. Many prominent Dresden residents such as the builder of the iconic landmark church Frauenkirche, architect George Bähr, and the greatest Saxon organ builder, Gottfried Silbermann found their final resting place at the old burial ground. The cemetery was closed in 1814 due to lack of space and sanitary reasons, and thus neglected cemetery fell into disrepair. For this reason, the city management decided to relocate the cemetery in 1854, despite citizens' petitions and heavy protests. In 1875, the Protestant church acquired land in the Tolkewitz district in order to establish a new cemetery here to replace the old abandoned cemeteries of the Lutheran St. Johannes, Frauenkirche and Kreuzkirche parishes in Dresden which ran out of space. The new burial ground was consecrated on May 16, 1881, by provost General-Superintendent Moritz Franz and the first burial was recorded on July 17 of the same year. The designated historic landmark chapel with an impressive dome was built by Paul Wallot in 1894 in the Neo-Renaissance style.

A jury led by Lutheran bishop Margot Käßmann awarded the Johannisfriedhof as the most beautiful cemetery in Germany on November 8, 2011.

== Notable burials ==
List is sorted in order of the year of death.

- Prince Kraft of Hohenlohe-Ingelfingen (1827-1892), Prussian general and nobleman
- Franz Curti (1854-1898), Swiss-German opera composer
- Otto Staudinger (1830-1900), entomologist and a natural history dealer considered one of the largest in the world specialising in the collection and sale of insects to museums, scientific institutions
- Maximilian Messmacher (1842-1906), Russian-German architect
- Grete Beier (1885-1908), the last woman who was publicly executed in the Kingdom of Saxony
- Ludwig Hartmann (composer) (1836-1910), composer and music critic
- August Toepler (1836-1912), chemist and physicist
- Hartmuth Baldamus (1891-1917), World War I flying ace credited with 18 aerial victories
- Christian Otto Mohr (1835-1918), civil engineer
- Martin Krause (mathematician) (1851-1920), mathematician
- Georg Treu (1843-1921), Classical archaeologist
- Woldemar von Seidlitz (1850-1922), Russian-born German art historian
- Hugo Richard Jüngst (1853-1923), composer and choir-leader
- Vali von der Osten (1882-1923), soprano, sister of Eva von der Osten
- Heinrich Ernemann (1850–1928) industrial camera maker, founder of Ernemann-Werke AG
- Carl Georg Oscar Drude (1852-1933), botanist
- Rudolf Schilling (1859-1933), architect
- Eva von der Osten (1881–1936), dramatic soprano
- Ferdinand Dorsch (1875-1938), painter, graphic artist
- Cornelius Gurlitt (art historian) (1850-1938), architect and art historian
- Hermann Ilgen (1856-1940), pharmacist, businessman and patron of art and sport
- Karl Emil Scherz (1860-1945), architect
- Walther Schieck (1874-1946), politician who served as the last Minister-President of Saxony during the Weimar Republic
- Adele Osterloh (1857-1946), poet
- Margarethe Siems (1879-1952), operatic dramatic coloratura soprano and voice teacher
- Eberhard Hempel (1886-1967), art historian, and professor at the TU Dresden specializing in the Baroque era
- Heinz Knobloch (1926-2003), writer and journalist
- Kurt Biedenkopf (1930-2021), jurist, academic and politician

== Gallery ==
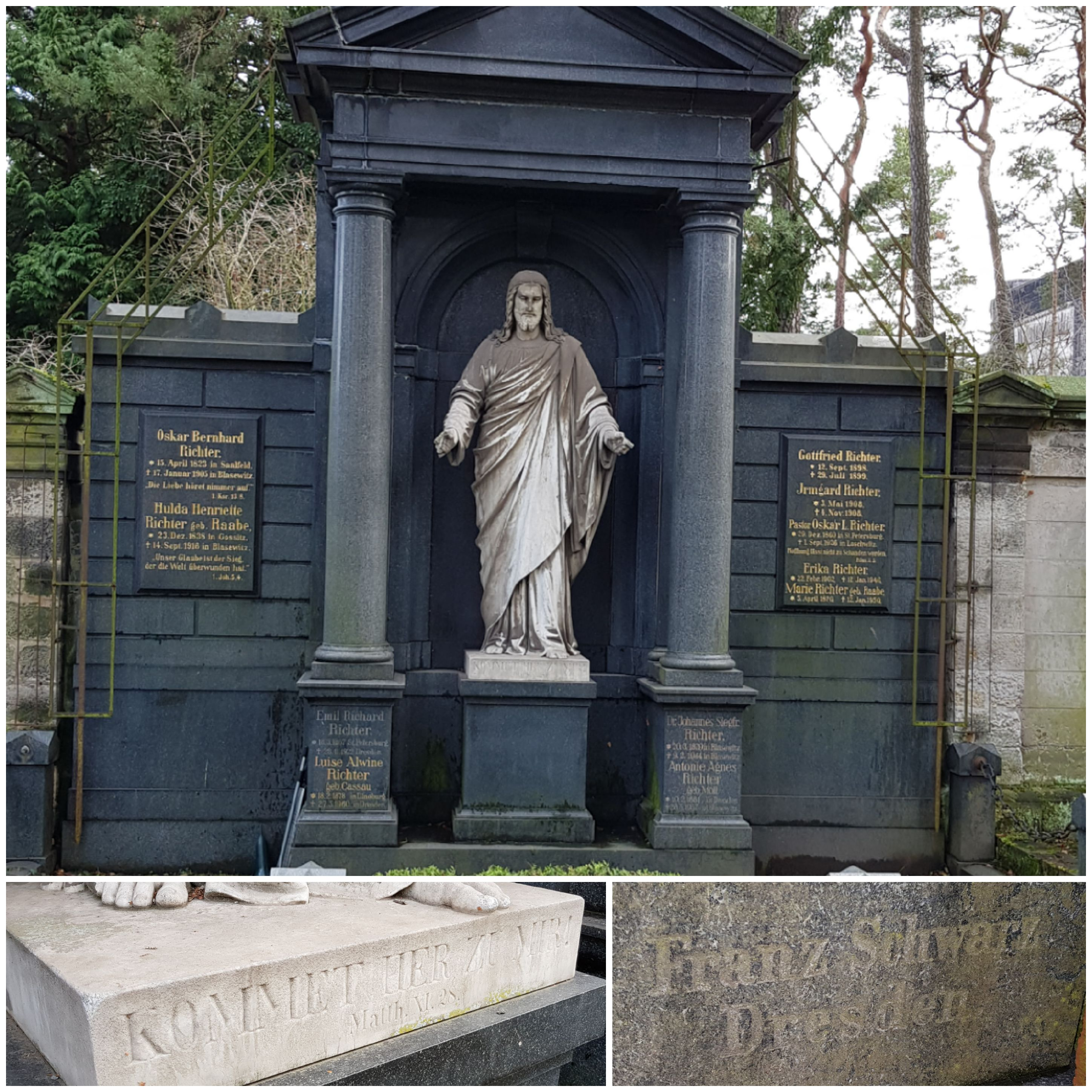
Christ the Redeemer on a gravesite

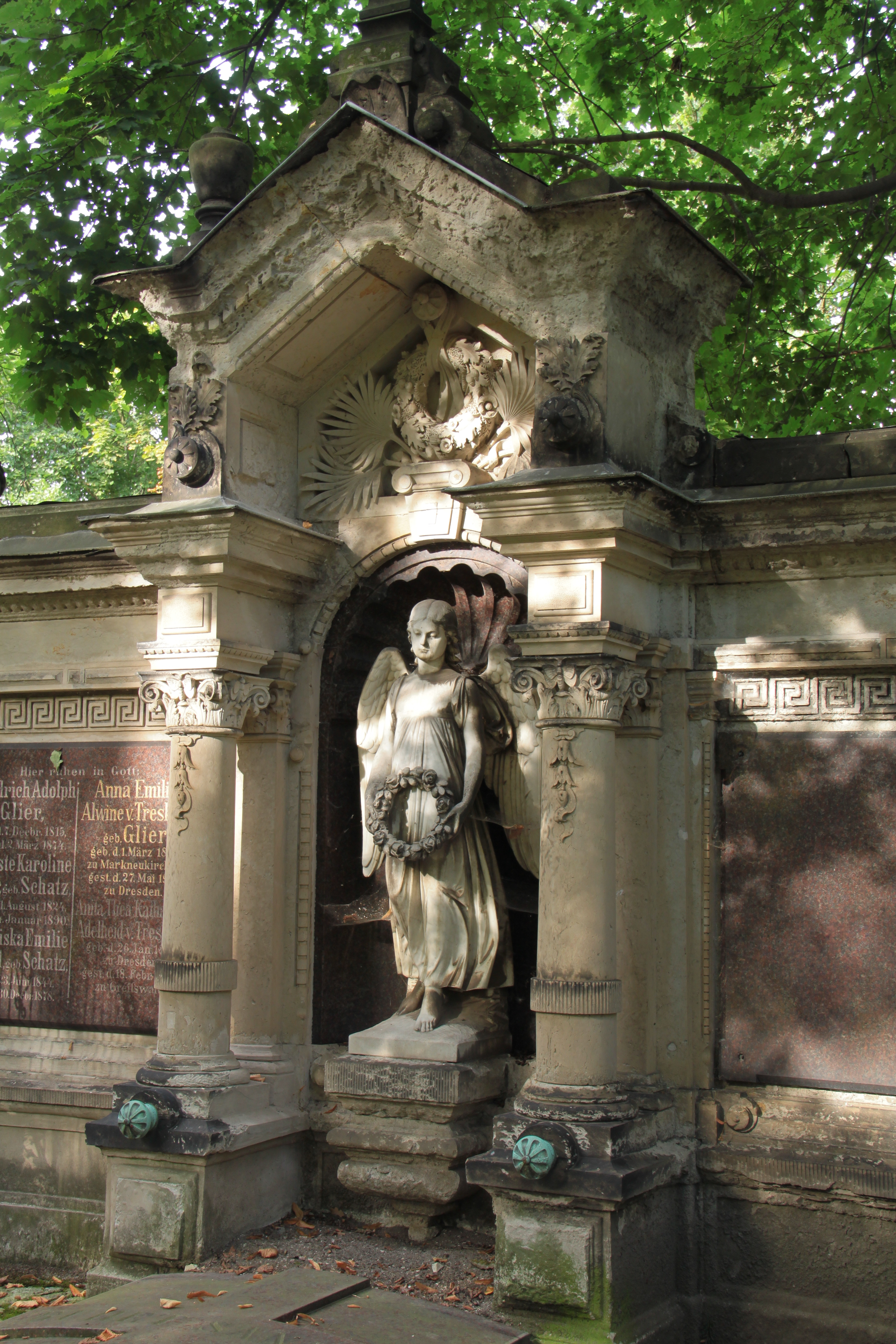
One of numerous grave monuments in Johannisfriedhof

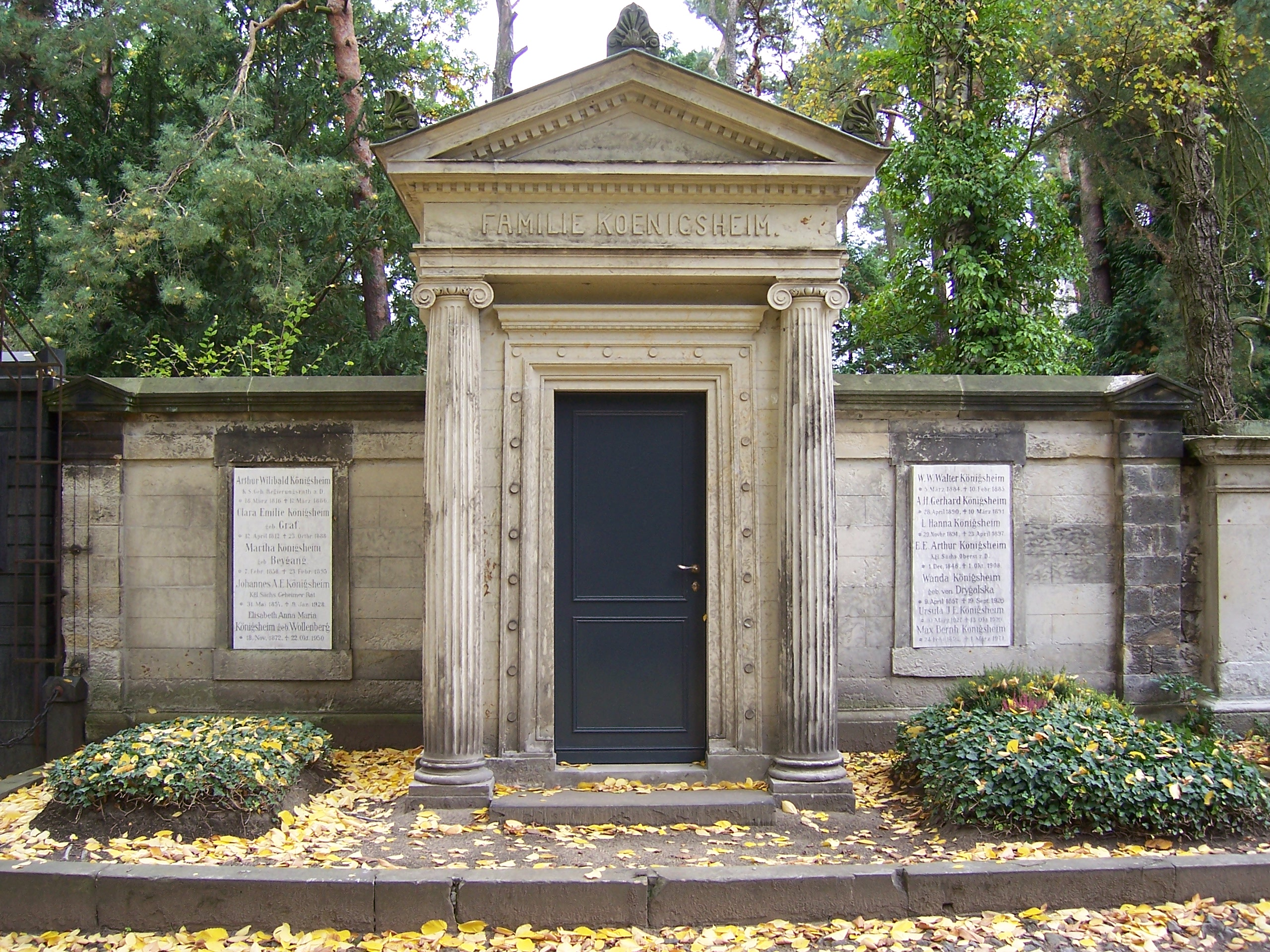
A family mausoleum

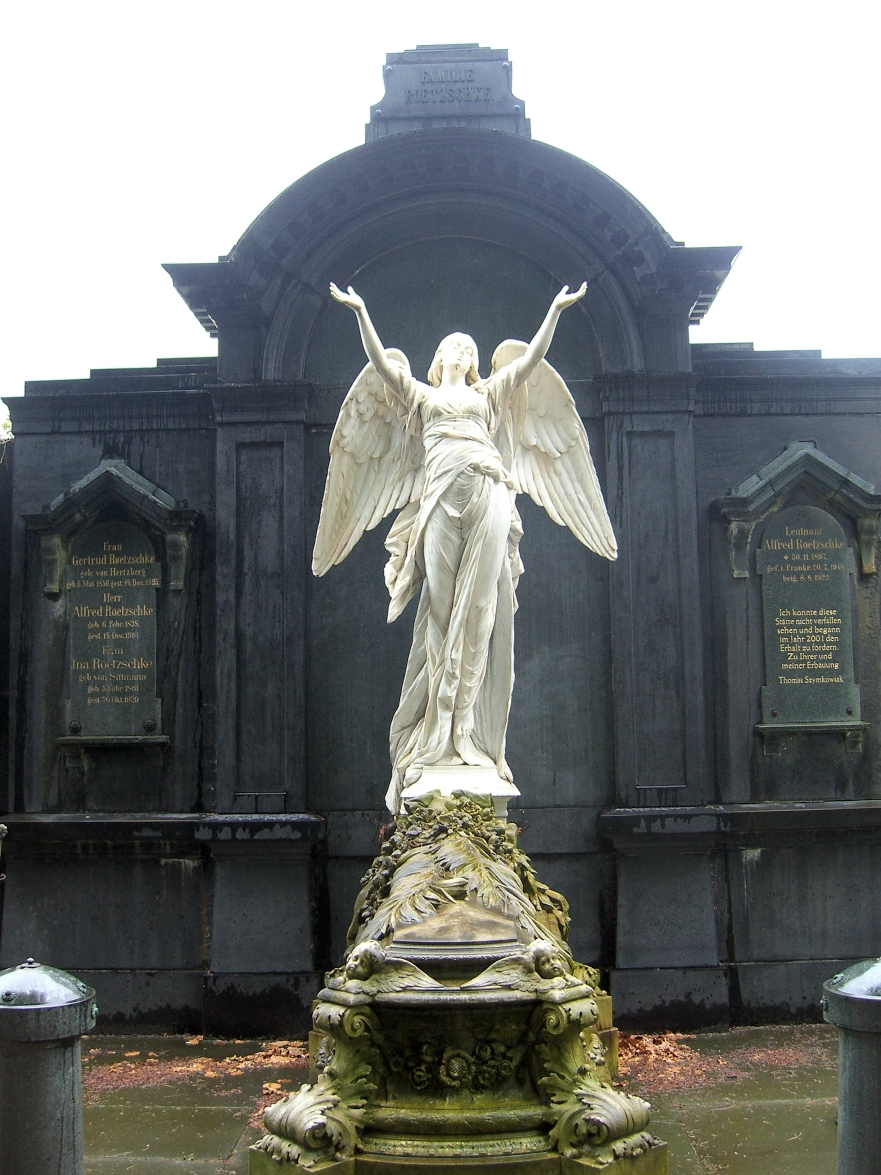
Resurrection angel

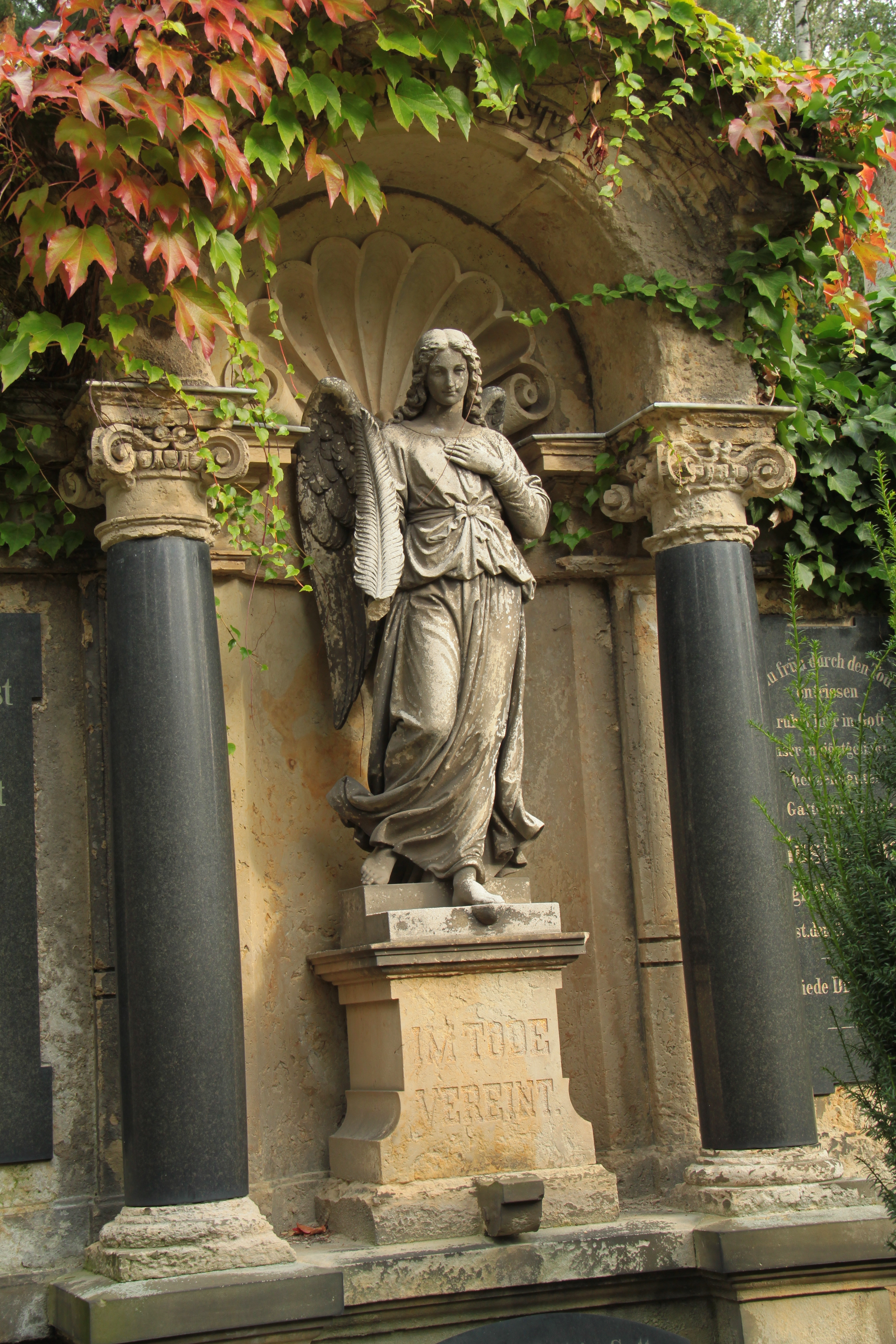
Autumn in Johannisfriedhof

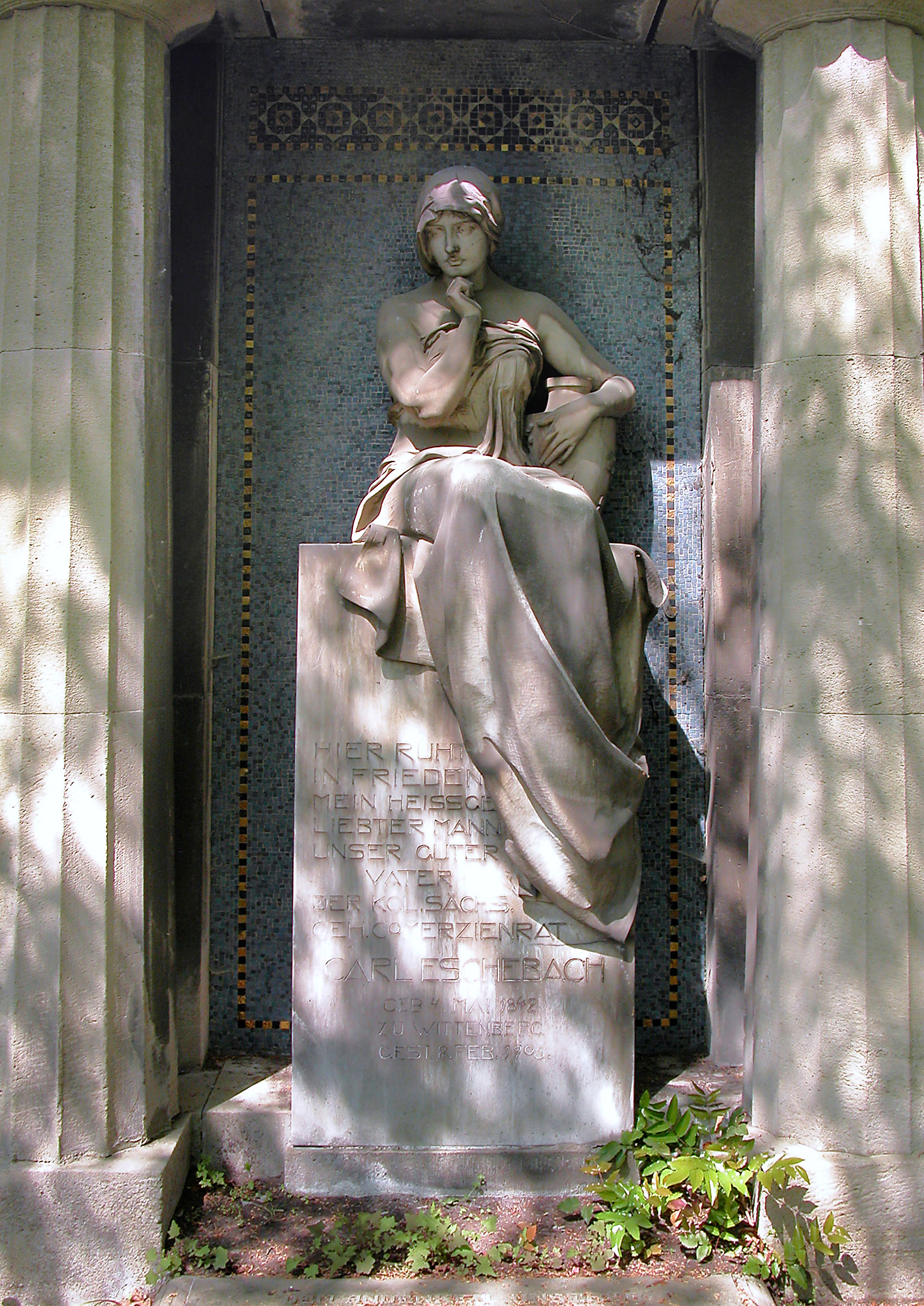

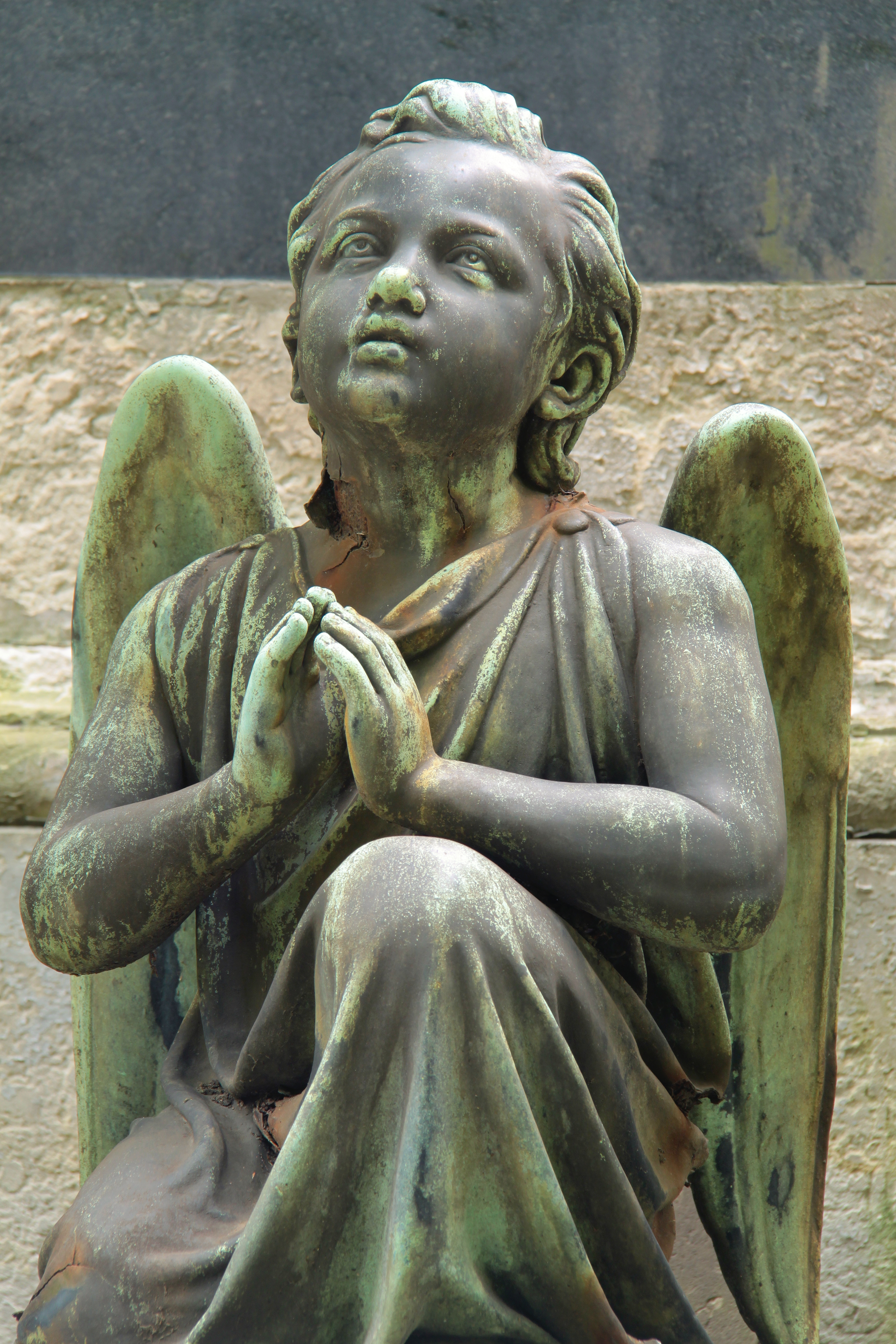

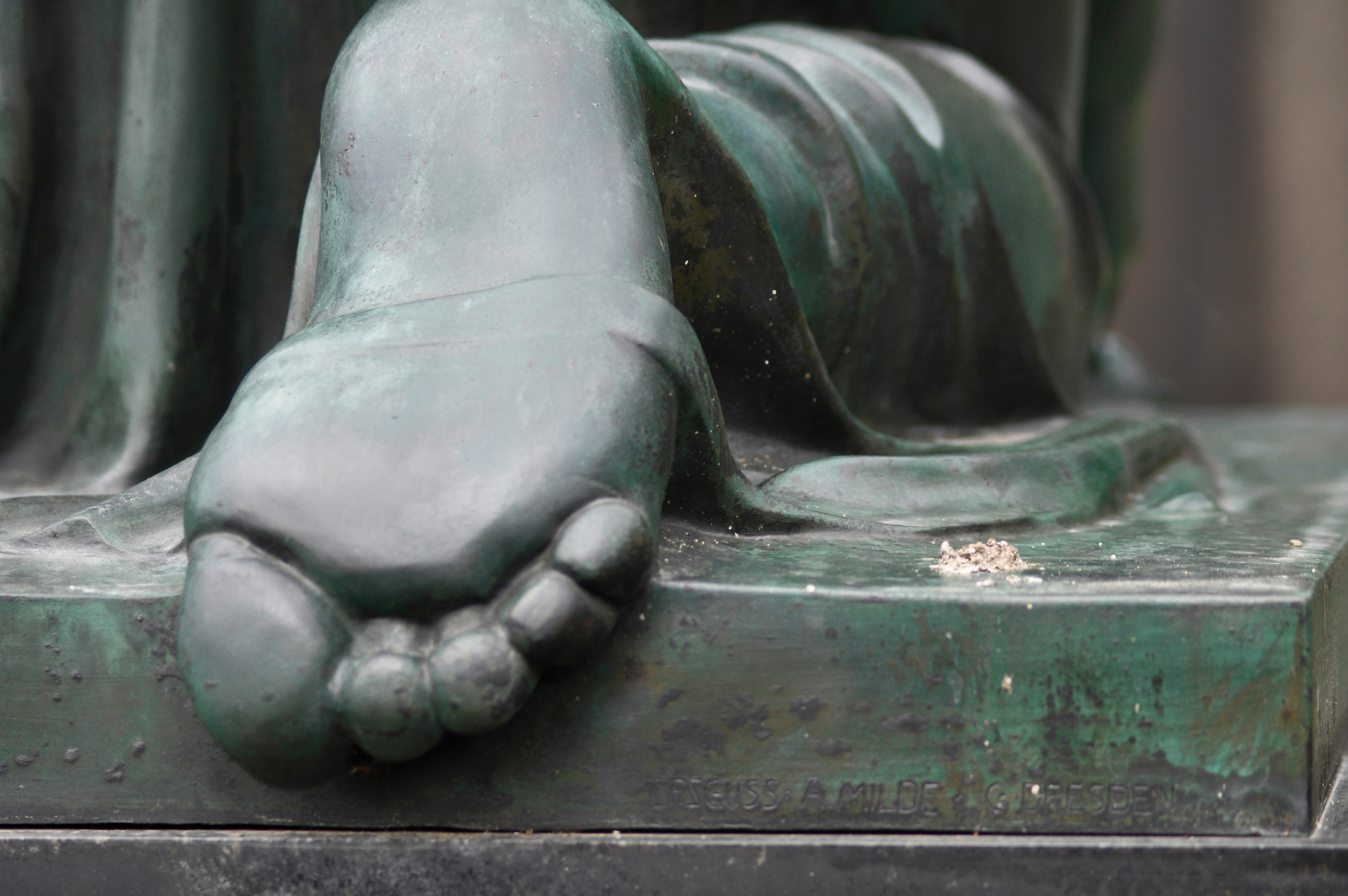

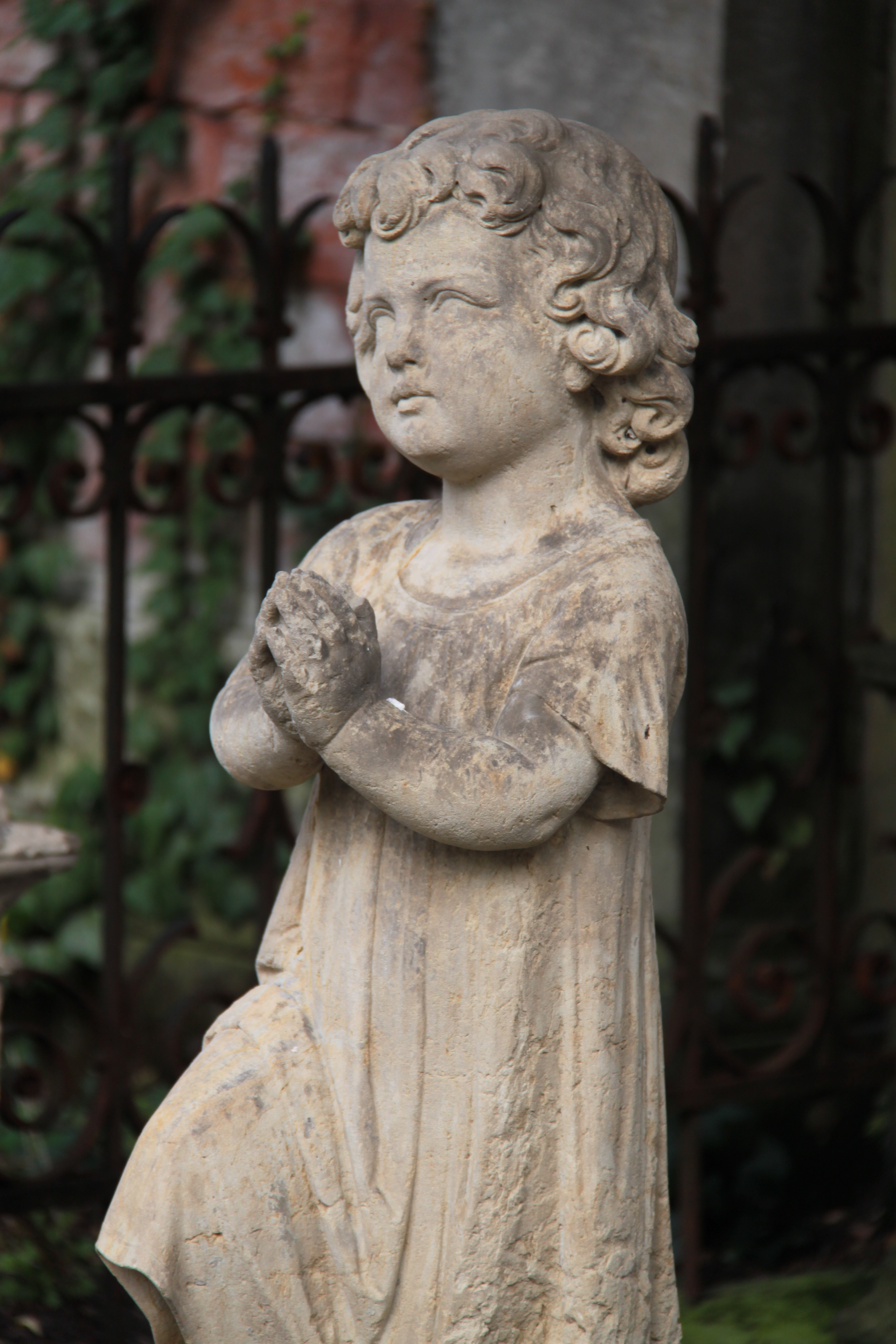

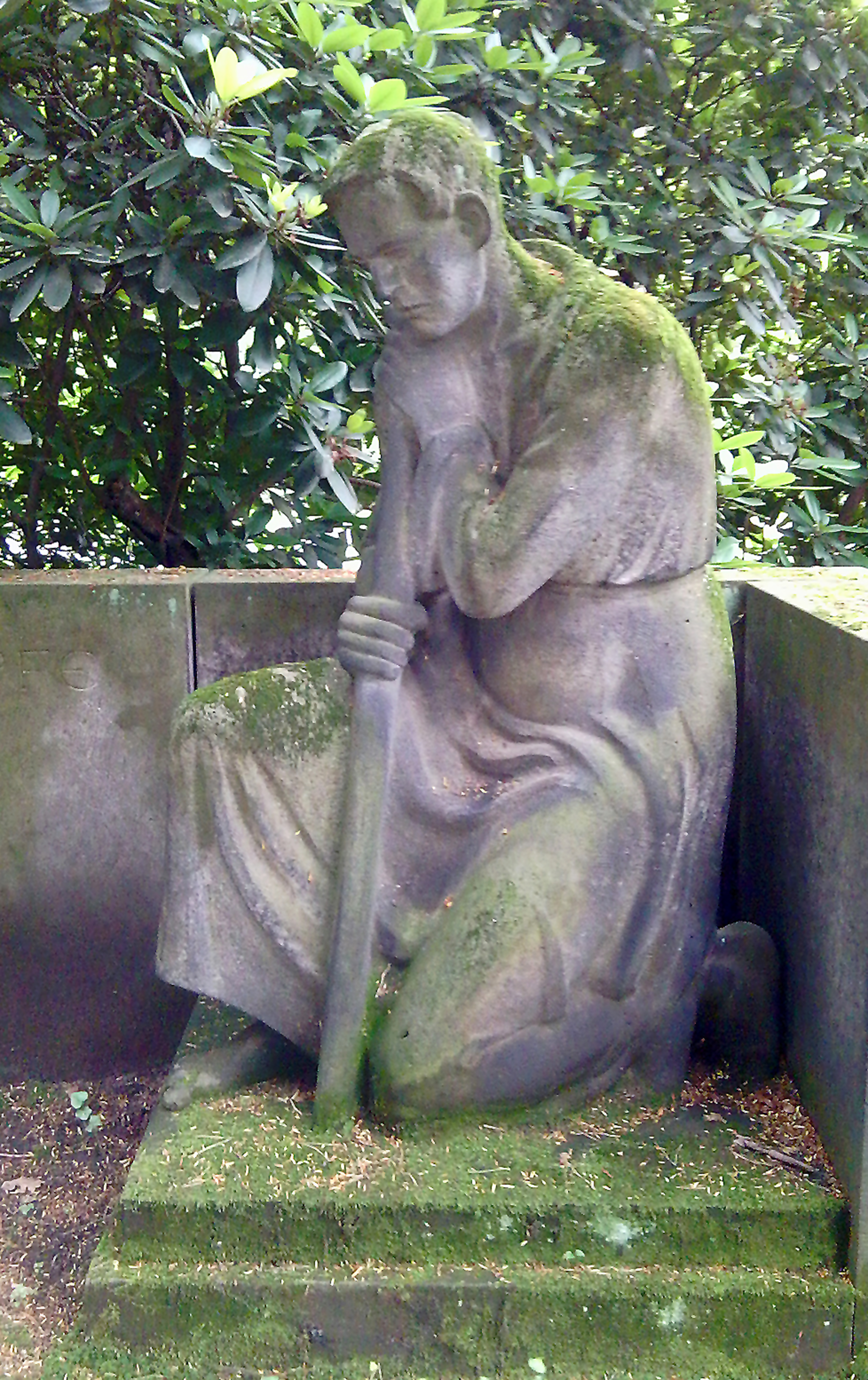

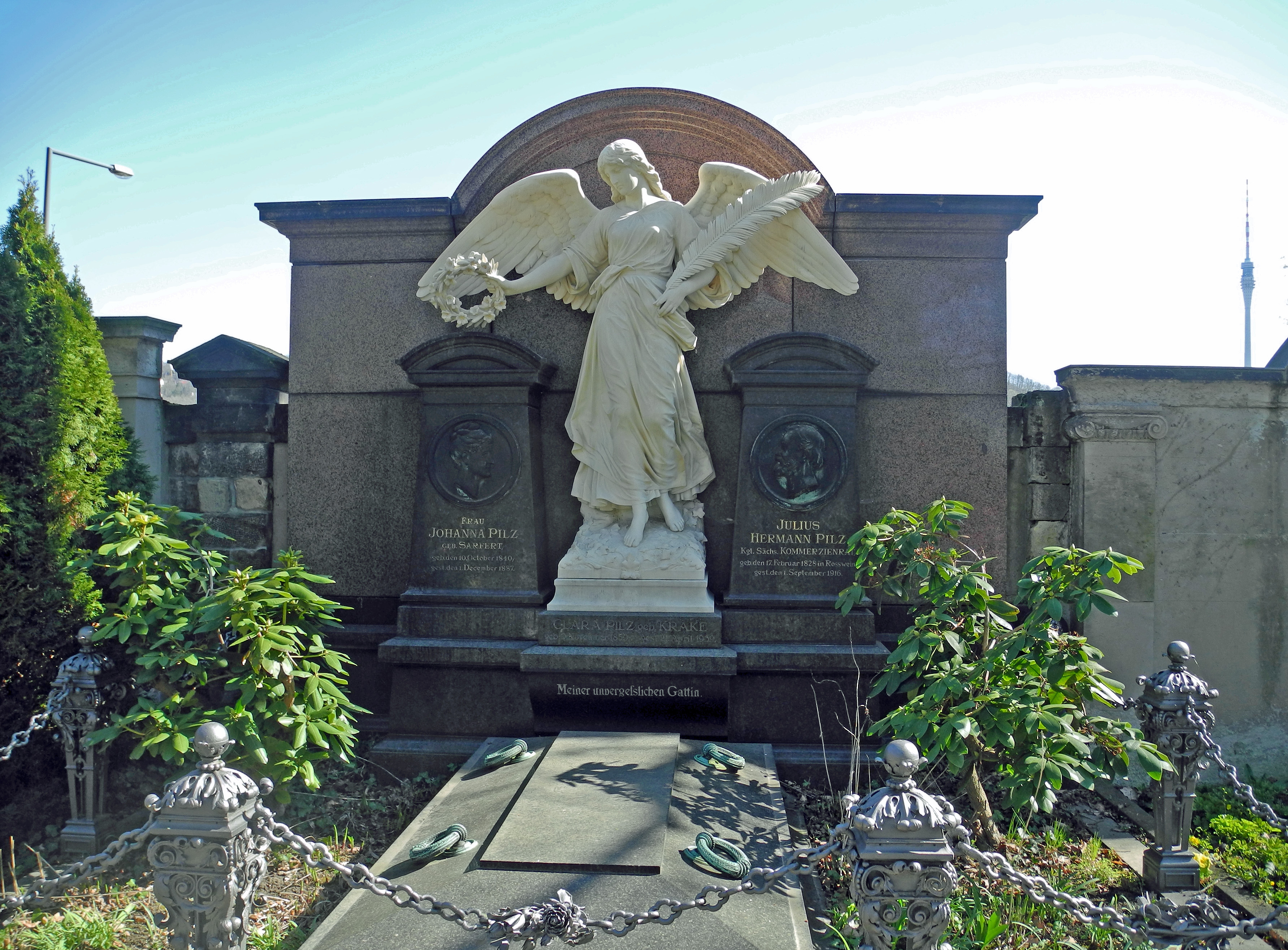

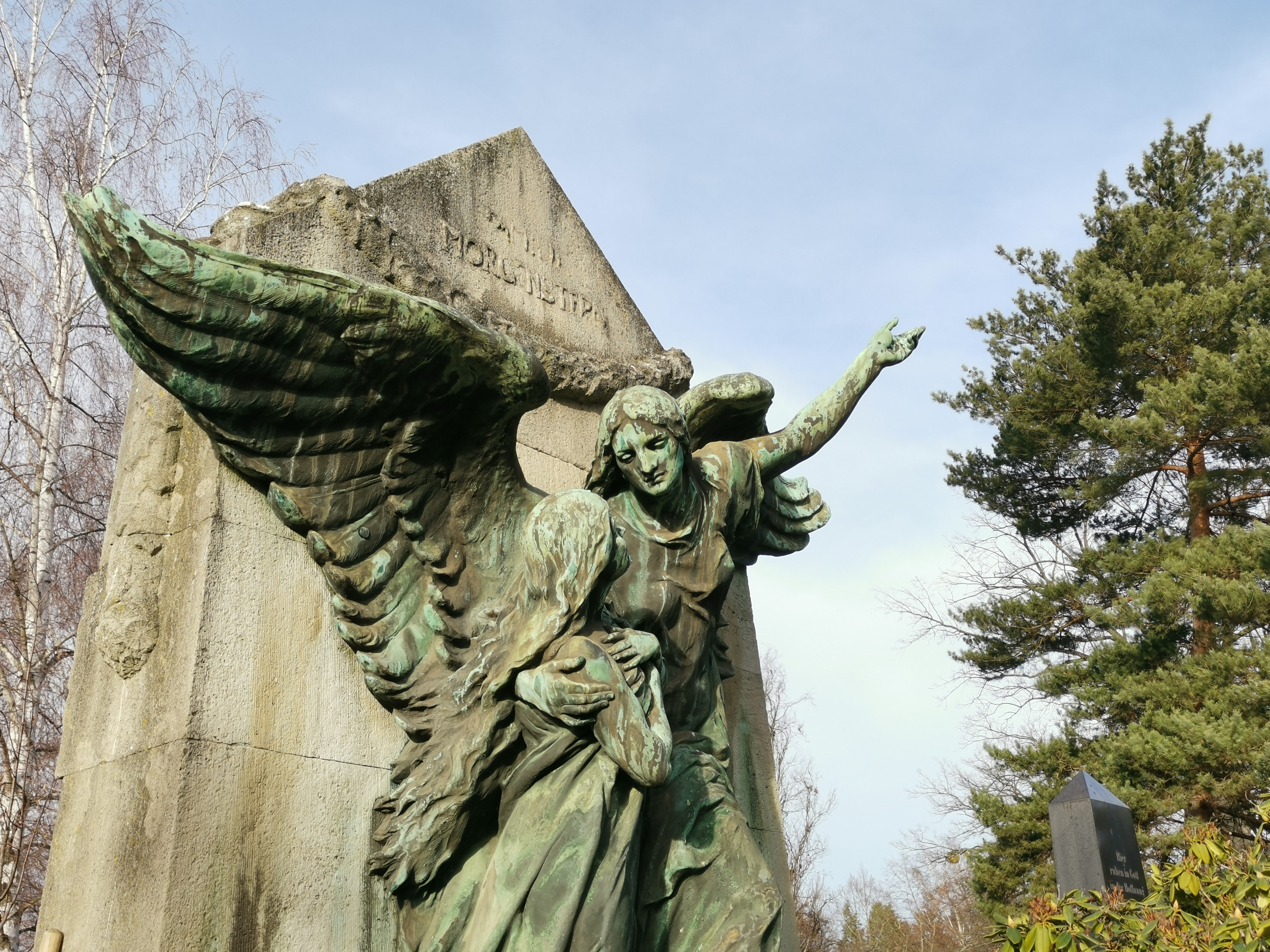
