= Ivan Tsvetaev =

Russian historian (1847–1913)

- Иван Цветаев
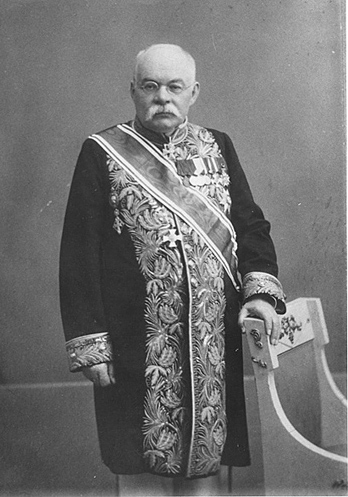
- Ivan Tsvetaev in 1913; photograph by Karl Fischer
- Born: 16 May 1847; Shuya, Ivanovo Oblast, Russian Empire
- Died: 12 September 1913 (aged 66); Moscow, Russian Empire
- Relatives: Marina Tsvetaeva (daughter); Anastasia Tsvetayeva (daughter)

Academic background
- Education: Saint Petersburg State University; Imperial University of Warsaw

Academic work
- Institutions: Moscow State University; Rumyantsev Museum

Ivan Vladimirovich Tsvetaev (Russian: Иван Владимирович Цветаев; 16 May [O. S. 4 May] 1847 – 12 September 1913) was a Russian art historian, archaeologist and Classical philologist.

== Biography ==
Tsvetaev was born 16 May (O. S. 4 May) 1847, in Shuya, Ivanovo Oblast, the son of Vladimir Vasilyevich Tsvetaev (1818–1884), a village priest. After the early death of his mother in 1859, his father raised him and his three brothers for a life in the priesthood, sending them to the religious school in Shuya, and then to the seminary in Vladimir. He also studied briefly at the Imperial Medical and Surgical Academy, but quit, citing poor health, and enrolled at Saint Petersburg State University instead; following a course in Classical Studies and graduating in 1870 as a "Candidate in the Sciences".

The following year, he became a teacher of Classical Greek Studies at a gymnasium in Saint Petersburg. This only lasted a short time as, in 1872, he was appointed a lecturer at the Imperial University of Warsaw, where he presented a dissertation on Tacitus to obtain his habilitation in 1873.

In 1874, he travelled to Italy to study the ancient Italic languages and writings. In 1876, he was called to the Saint Vladimir Royal University of Kiev. Still, he only a year later was presented with a position at the Moscow State University as a candidate for the Chair of the Latin literature department.

He married Varvara Ilovayskaya, an opera singer. Under her influence, he gradually switched his interests from Classical philology to antiquities. After 1881, he worked at the Rumyantsev Museum, serving as its director from 1900 to 1910. In 1888, he was named an honorary faculty member at the University of Bologna. By the following year, he had made a part-time return to the academic world as the Chair of Art History and Theory at Moscow University. He also became a contributor to a journal, the Philological Review. Varvara died in 1890 and he remarried in 1891; to Maria Meyn, a pianist. They had two daughters; Marina and Anastasia, both of whom became well-known poets and writers.

In 1894, at the "First Congress of Artists and Art Lovers", he presented plans for a new museum of fine arts, inspired by a visit to the Albertinum in Dresden, where he became lifelong friends with Georg Treu, the head of its world-famous Skulpturensammlung. A design competition was organized and the award went to Roman Klein. In 1897, Tsvetaev was able to secure the wealthy glassware manufacturer, Yury Nechaev-Maltsov, as the museum's primary sponsor. The cornerstone was laid in 1899 and the museum was officially opened in 1912. Tsvetaev served as its first director until his death on 12 September 1913, in Moscow. Originally the "Alexander III Museum of Fine Arts", it is now known as the Pushkin Museum.
