= Vali von der Osten =

German soprano

Vali (also, Vally) von der Osten (29 November 1882 – 15 August 1923) was a German soprano. She was the daughter of actor Emil von der Osten (1847–1905) and Rosa von der Osten-Hildebrandt (1850–1911).

Von der Osten was born in Dresden, where she studied voice and appeared primarily at the Hoftheater Kassel, excelling in spinto (or jugendlich-dramatisch) roles of Richard Wagner operas such as Elisabeth in Tannhäuser, Elsa in Lohengrin, and Eva in Die Meistersinger von Nürnberg.

She was married to the tenor Fritz Windgassen (1883–1963) and thus used the name Vali Windgassen-von der Osten. The marriage produced one son, Wolfgang Windgassen (1914–1974), who went on to become a Wagnerian tenor in his own right.

Von der Osten died in Kassel and is buried in the Johannis cemetery in Dresden-Tolkewitz, beside her sister, singer Eva von der Osten.

== Literature ==
- André Kaiser: Berühmte Persönlichkeiten aus der Ortschaft Kurort Hartha: Eva von der Osten (1884–1936) – eine Dresdner Opernsängerin von Weltruf, in Rund um den Tharandter Wald - Amtsblatt der Stadt Tharandt, März 2009
