= Eva von der Osten =

German soprano (1881–1936)

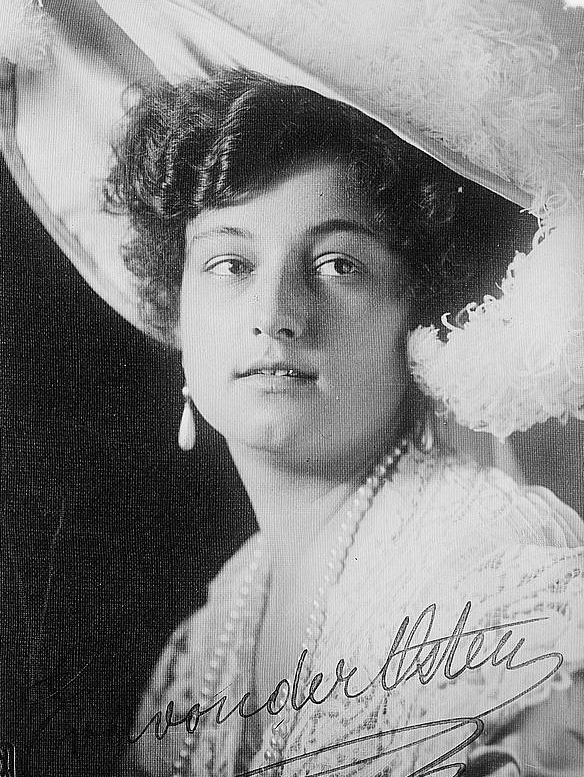

Eva Helga Bertha von der Osten (19 August 1881 – 5 May 1936) was a German dramatic soprano.

== Biography ==
She was born in Helgoland, the daughter of actor Emil von der Osten (1847–1905) and Rosa von der Osten-Hildebrandt (1850–1911). Von der Osten debuted in 1902 at the Dresdner Hofoper and performed there regularly until the end of her career. She was a favorite of the Dresden opera-going public and sang many of the most important roles of the soprano repertory. Von der Osten also was active as an opera director and served in that capacity for the premiere performance of Richard Strauss’s Arabella. She created the role of Octavian in Strauss' Der Rosenkavalier.

Von der Osten’s career led to guest appearances in many of Europe’s leading opera houses. From 1923 to 1924, she found great success in the female roles of Richard Wagner—particularly that of Isolde in Tristan und Isolde—while touring with director Leo Blech’s “German Opera Company” in North America. When she retired in 1927 after a 25-year career, Von der Osten had made over 2500 operatic appearances.

She was married to the bass-baritone Friedrich Plaschke (1874–1952) and thus used the name "Eva Plaschke-von der Osten".

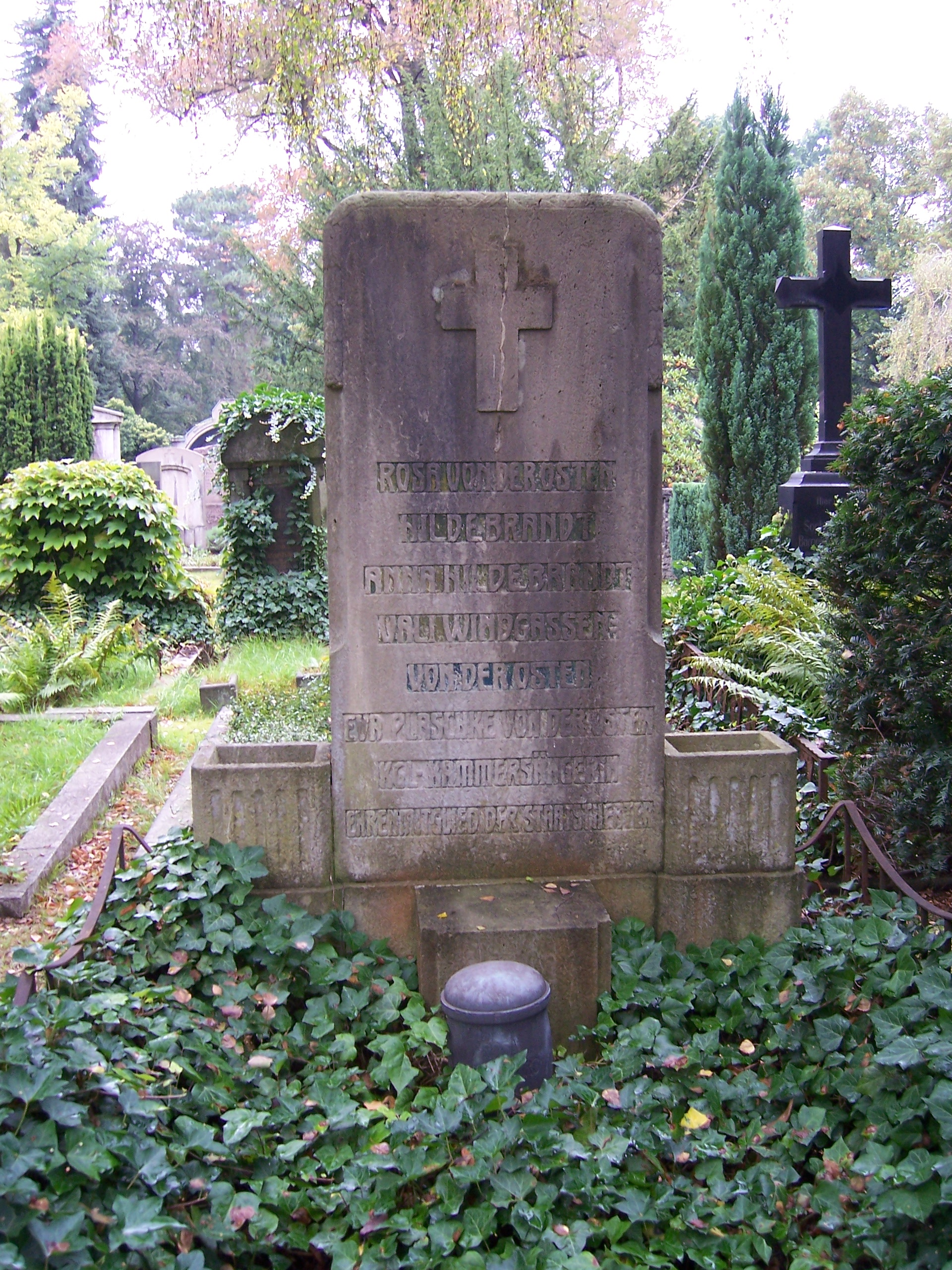
Eva von der Osten’s grave in the Johannisfriedhof in Dresden.

Von der Osten died in 1936 at her estate at Talmühlenstraße 49 in Kurort Hartha (today: Tharandt). She is buried in the Johannisfriedhof in Dresden-Tolkewitz beside her sister, the singer Vali von der Osten. Her nephew, Wolfgang Windgassen, was a heldentenor held in similar stature.

== Literature ==
- André Kaiser: Berühmte Persönlichkeiten aus der Ortschaft Kurort Hartha: Eva von der Osten (1884–1936) – eine Dresdner Opernsängerin von Weltruf, in Rund um den Tharandter Wald - Amtsblatt der Stadt Tharandt, März 2009, page 27f.
