= Ferdinand Dorsch =

German painter

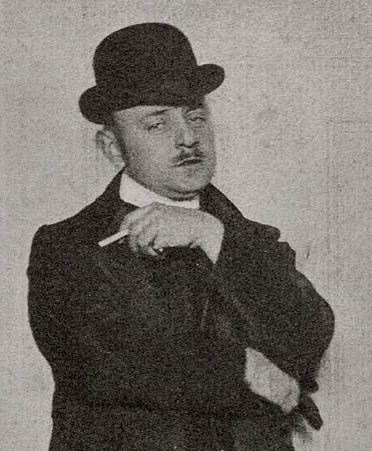
Ferdinand Dorsch, photograph by Hugo Erfurth (1907)

Ferdinand Franz Engelbert Dorsch (10 December 1875 – 9 January 1938) was a German painter, graphic artist, and art Professor.

== Life and work ==
He was born in Pécs. While he was still very young, his family moved to Vienna, where he grew up. In 1891, thanks to a scholarship from the Principality of Reuss-Gera, he was able to study at the Dresden Academy of Fine Arts with Leon Pohle and Ferdinand Pauwels. From 1895 to 1898, he worked with Gotthardt Kuehl, who became a lifelong friend and patron.

He returned to Vienna in 1898, where he made the acquaintance of Carl Moll, a member of the Vienna Secession, who prompted him to join. In addition to painting portraits, he supported himself by doing photo retouching. By 1901, he was back in Dresden. The following year, he joined "Die Elbier", an artists' cooperative founded by his friend, Kuehl. In 1909, he himself was one of the founders of the Künstlervereinigung Dresden. During this time, he took several painting trips with Kuehl, and was inspired to become an Impressionist.

Due to a lack of commissions, beginning in 1904, he operated his own painting school. His students included Annemarie Heise and Conrad Felixmüller. He was named a Professor at the Dresden Academy in 1914, but continued to operate his school until 1916, when the workload became too great. His best known students there included Otto Dix, Franz Lenk, Robert Liebknecht, and Paul Sinkwitz. In 1926/27 and again from 1935, he served as Rector.

From 1906 to 1921, he was a member of the Sächsischer Kunstverein (artists' association), and was its Chairman in 1918. That same year, he was awarded a Knight's Cross in the Albert Order. He and Max Feldbauer jointly operated a studio from 1922. A special exhibition of his works was held in Berlin in 1935. He died in Dresden at the age of sixty-two, and was interred at the Johannisfriedhof. No catalogue raisonné of his works has been compiled. They may be seen at the National Gallery (Berlin), the Galerie Neue Meister and the Städtische Galerie in Dresden, and the Museum der bildenden Künste in Leipzig, among many others.

== Selected paintings ==
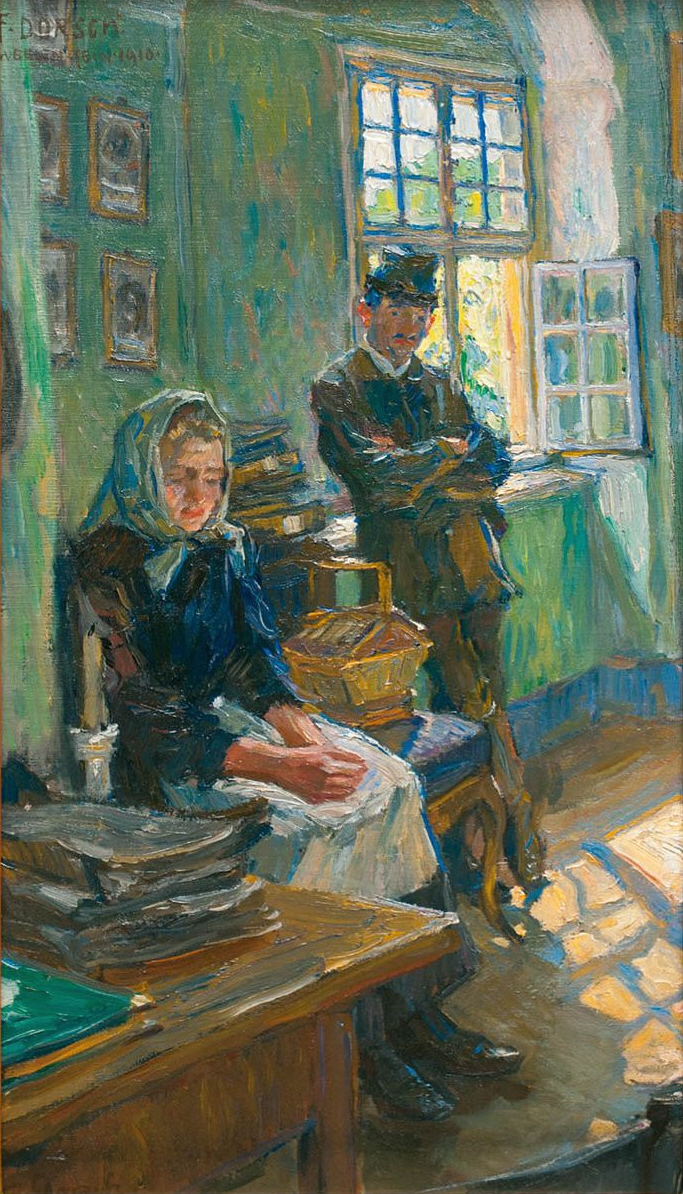
In the Office

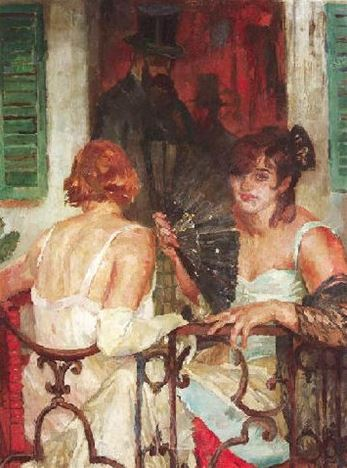
On the Balcony

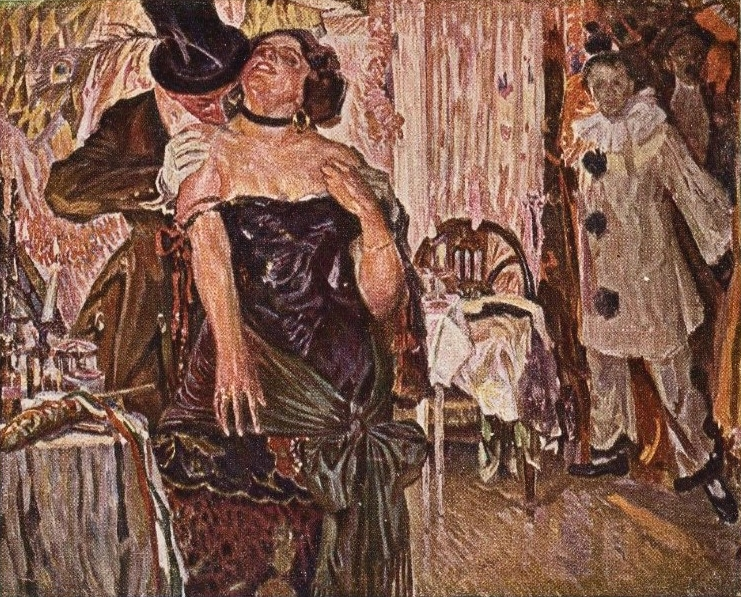
Carnival Games

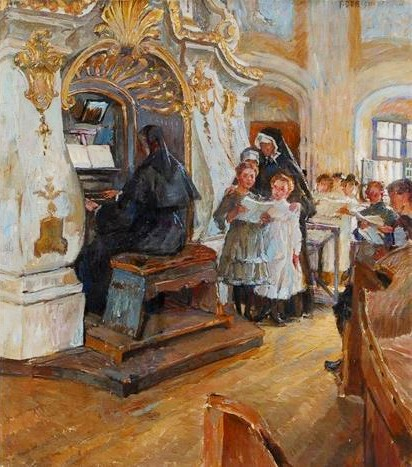
In the Chapel at
Schloss Weesenstein

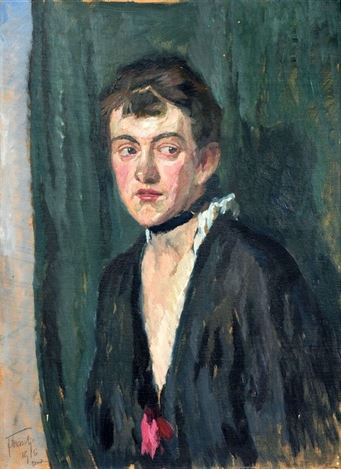
Young Woman in a
Black Dress

== Sources ==
- "Dorsch, Ferdinand", In: Hans Vollmer (Ed.): Allgemeines Lexikon der bildenden Künstler des XX. Jahrhunderts, Vol.1: A–D. E. A. Seemann, Leipzig 1953, pg.587
- Ferdinand Dorsch 1875–1938. Ein Künstlerleben in Dresden, exhibition catalog, with contributions by Georg Siebert, Conrad Felixmüller et al., Galerie von Abercron, Cologne 1976 (Entry at the Deutsche National Bibliothek)
- Dieter Hoffmann (Ed.): Dresden, ein Traum. Lithographien und Zeichnungen von Ferdinand Dorsch, Hellerau-Verlag, Dresden 1993. ISBN 978-3-910184-17-6
