= Woldemar von Seidlitz =

German art historian (1850–1922)

Woldemar von Seidlitz (1 June 1850, in St Petersburg – 12 January 1922, in Dresden) was a Russian-born German art historian.

== Biography ==
Seydlitz was born into an old German noble family, which can trace their noble ancestry from 13th century. He studied economics at the Imperial University of Dorpat and at the Heidelberg University, followed by studies of art history at Leipzig as a pupil of Anton Springer. From 1879 to 1884 he worked as a directorial assistant at the Kupferstichkabinett Berlin, then from 1885 to 1918 served as an executive councilor to the Directorate-General of the Royal Collections for Art and Science in Dresden.

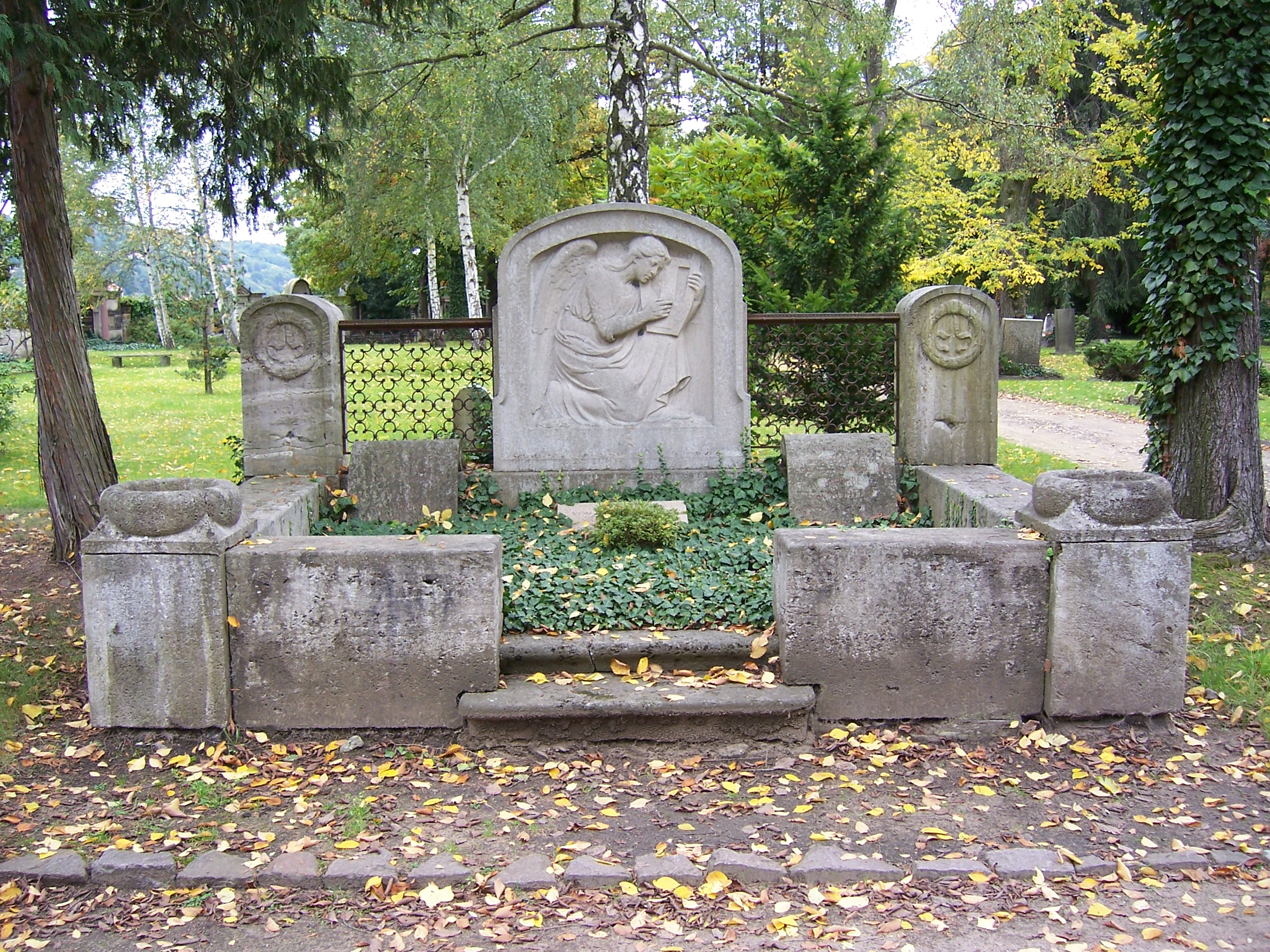
Gravesite of Seidlitz at the Johannisfriedhof in Dresden

== Literary works ==
- Allgemeines historisches Porträtwerk, 6 vols., 1884–90 – General historical portrait work.
- Rembrandts Radierungen, 1894 – Rembrandt's etchings.
- Kritische Verzeichnis der Radierungen Rembrandts, 1895 – Critical directory of etchings by Rembrandt.
- Geschichte des japanischen Farbenholzschnittes, 1897 – History of Japanese colored woodcuts.
- Leonardo da Vinci, der Wendepunkt der Renaissance, 1909 – Leonardo da Vinci, the turning point of the Renaissance.
- Die Kunst in Dresden vom Mittelalter bis zur Neuzeit, 1920–22 – Art in Dresden from the Middle Ages to the modern era.
