= Fritz Windgassen =

German opera singer

Fritz Windgassen (9 February 1883 – 17 April 1963) was a German Heldentenor and teacher.

Windgassen was born in Lennep (now part of Remscheid) in the Prussian Rhine Province. Following the wishes of his middle-class parents, he took up a respectable career in the German navy. Only after Prince Heinrich of Prussia praised his singing ability did he dare embark on a singing career. After training in the Bernuth Conservatoire in Hamburg, he made his debut in 1909 in Harburg. Further engagements took him to Bremen, Hamburg, and the Court Theatre in Kassel, where he met the coloratura soprano Vali von der Osten, whom he married in 1916. From 1923 to 1945, he was a member of the Stuttgart National Opera. Beginning in 1919 he increasingly specialised in Heldentenor roles and became a renowned interpreter of Richard Wagner.

He was also much in demand as a concert and Lieder performer. He gave his farewell concert in Stuttgart in 1949, featuring works by Richard Strauss, Gustav Mahler, and Hugo Wolf among others; his son, Wolfgang Windgassen, later a celebrated Heldentenor in his own right, also took part.

After his retirement from the stage, Windgassen taught at the Stuttgart College of Music. Among his pupils was the bass Gottlob Frick. Windgassen died in Murnau.
