= Jüngst =

Jüngst is a German surname. Notable people with the surname include:

- Antonie Jüngst (1843–1918), Westphalian writer and poet
- Hugo Richard Jüngst (1853–1923), German composer and choir-leader
