= Wolfgang Windgassen =

German operatic tenor

Wolfgang Windgassen (26 June 1914 – 8 September 1974) was a German heldentenor internationally known for his performances in Wagner operas.

== Life and career ==
Born in Annemasse, France, he was the son (and pupil) of a well known German Heldentenor, Fritz Windgassen (who was also the teacher of Gottlob Frick). His mother was the German coloratura soprano Vali von der Osten, sister of the much more famous soprano Eva von der Osten, who created the part of Octavian in Richard Strauss' Der Rosenkavalier. Both Windgassen's parents were longtime mainstays of the Staatsoper Stuttgart.

Wolfgang made his début at Pforzheim as Pinkerton in Madama Butterfly. After army service he became a member of the Stuttgart opera company, and succeeded his father as principal tenor. Stuttgart opera remained his home base throughout his career, and for the last two years of his life he was its artistic director.

Windgassen sang at all the important opera houses all over the world. He was invited to perform at the reopening of the Bayreuth Festival in 1951 and continued to appear there till 1970, singing all the great Wagnerian tenor roles: Erik, Tannhäuser, Lohengrin, Tristan, Walter, Loge, Siegmund, both Siegfrieds and Parsifal, his debut role in 1951. He sang his final Tristan in his own production on 27 April 1972 at the Théâtre Municipal de Strasbourg, where he had appeared over 80 times, conducted by Frédéric Adam.

Windgassen was married to soprano Lore Wissmann. He died from a heart attack in Stuttgart at the age of 60.

== Recordings ==
He is well represented on record, both in studio recordings and live tapings. Pre-eminent among the former is the Decca Ring, conducted by Georg Solti and produced by John Culshaw. He was not Culshaw’s first choice for Siegfried, who initially preferred the more powerful voice of Ernst Kozub. But Kozub's musical limitations led to his removal; Windgassen magnanimously stood in for him at the last minute. Windgassen had been the preeminent Heldentenor of the postwar era and the Bayreuth Festival's leading Siegfried, singing the role in the festival's Ring cycles from the mid-1950s through the 1960s. When Kozub proved unable to learn the part in time, Windgassen was the obvious replacement.

His live Bayreuth recording of Tristan und Isolde with Birgit Nilsson as Isolde, conducted by Karl Böhm, is still highly regarded by many critics – see for example Richard Osborne’s note to the reissue of that recording on DG Originals.

Windgassen was the Siegfried in several complete, live Rings from Bayreuth that have been issued commercially on CD, conducted by such now-legendary figures as Hans Knappertsbusch, Clemens Krauss, Joseph Keilberth, and Karl Böhm. He was also the Loge and Siegmund in Wilhelm Furtwängler's Ring broadcast by the Italian Radio (RAI) in 1953, and subsequently issued as a best-selling CD box, as well as Florestan in the EMI studio recording of Fidelio directed by Furtwängler. Recorded performances are also available as Parsifal, Walther von Stolzing, Tannauser, Erik, Lohengrin, Froh, Max, Prince Orlofsky, Rienzi, and Beethoven's Ninth Symphony.

== Video ==
He can be seen on video in a performance as Tristan (with Birgit Nilsson and Hans Hotter, in Wieland Wagner's production, conducted by Pierre Boulez), as Otello (singing in German), as Prince Orlofsky, and briefly in concerts and rehearsals on various anthologies.

== Anecdotes ==
During a performance of Siegfried in Covent Garden in 1955 Windgassen realised that only the fragments of the sword he was supposed to forge together had been provided, and that there was no hidden sword nearby that he could pull out and swing to cut the anvil as required in the script. He was faced with the urgent necessity of forging the real "Nothung" so that he could proceed to slice the cardboard anvil. He kept cool while singing and slowly retreating further and further into the wings, where he managed to get someone to bring him the complete Nothung from backstage, which he then carefully smuggled under his cloak, undetected by the audience.

Trade union offices
Preceded by Viktor de Kowa	President of the Arts Union; 1966–1973	Succeeded by Otto Sprenger
