= Brand-Erbisdorf =

- Town
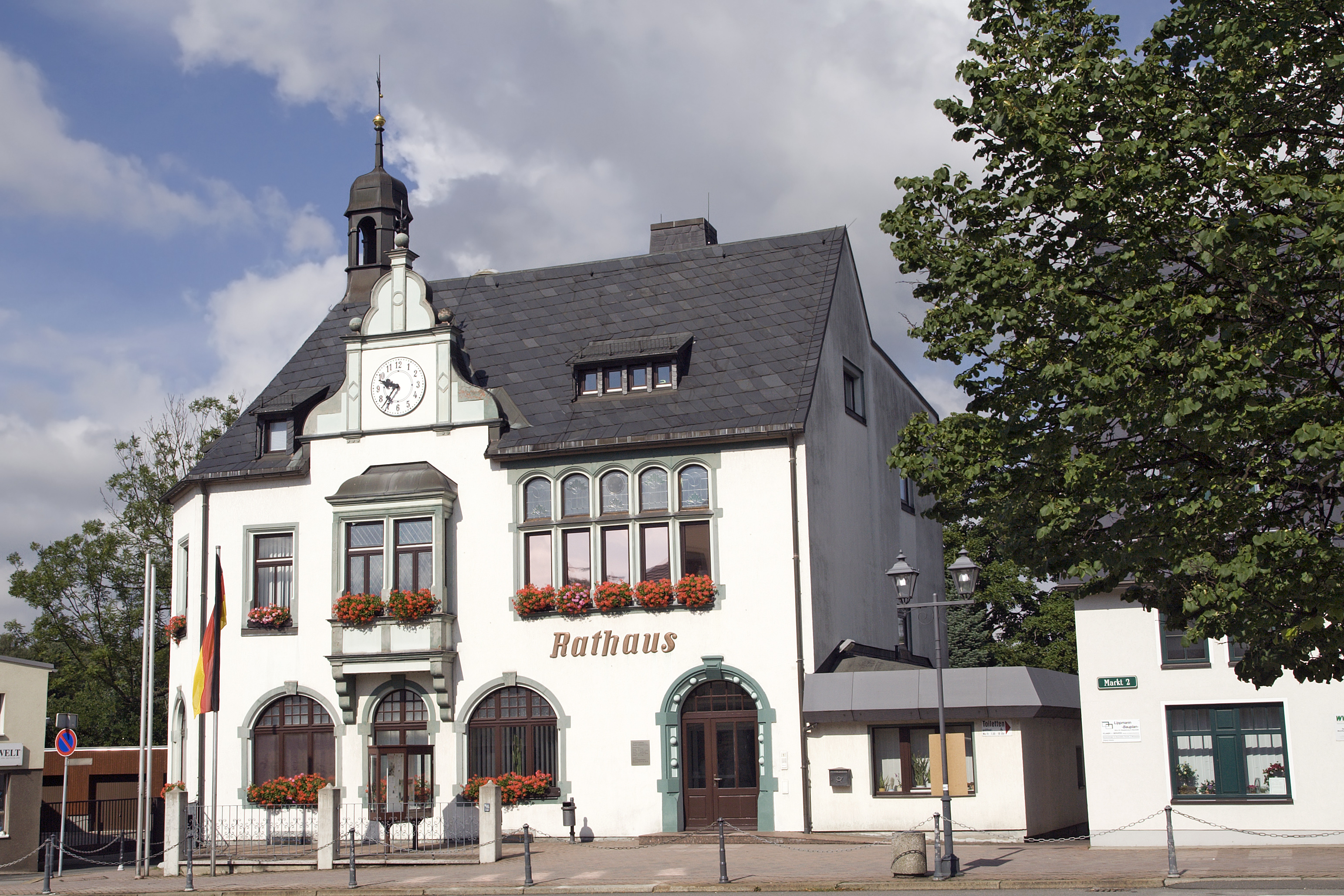
- Town hall

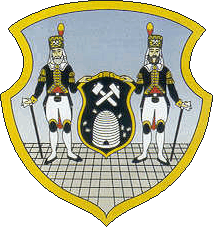
- Coat of arms

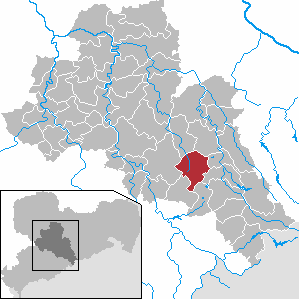
- Location of Brand-Erbisdorf within Mittelsachsen district
- Interactive map of Brand-Erbisdorf
- Location within Germany Location within Saxony
- Coordinates: 50°52′8″N 13°19′19″E
- Country: Germany
- State: Saxony
- District: Mittelsachsen
- Subdivisions: Core town and 6 Stadtteile

Government
  - Mayor (2021–28): Dr. Martin Antonow (Ind.)

Area
  - Total: 46.33 km^{2} (17.89 sq mi)
- Elevation: 480 m (1,570 ft)

Population (2025-12-31)
  - Total: 8,695
  - Density: 187.7/km^{2} (486.1/sq mi)
- Time zone: UTC+01:00 (CET)
  - Summer (DST): UTC+02:00 (CEST)
- Postal codes: 09618
- Dialling codes: 037322
- Vehicle registration: FG, BED, DL, FLÖ, HC, MW, RL
- Website: www.brand-erbisdorf.de

Brand-Erbisdorf (German pronunciation: [ˌbʁantˈʔɛʁbɪsdɔʁf]) is a small town in the district of Mittelsachsen, in Saxony, Germany. It is situated 5 km south of Freiberg. As of 2020, the town has a population of 9,145.

== History ==
The town is first mentioned in 1209 as Erlwinesberc, although it is suggested that it was founded earlier, in the middle of the 12th century.

The long tradition of silver mining around the town came to an end in the beginning of the 20th century. It was only after 1945 that the mining industry reappeared to a limited extent, before finally closing in 1968. From 1900 onwards, various other industries began to take hold in the town, slowly replacing mining as the primary industry. Of these were most notably the wood industry originating from the Ore Mountains and the "Elite-Werke".

== Personalities ==
- Grete Beier (1885–1908), daughter of the then mayor of Brand, was the last person to be publicly executed in Saxony for murder
- Günter Wirth (1929–2009), university lecturer for church history, publicist and official of the CDU of the GDR
- André Tanneberger (born 1973 in Freiberg) music producer and DJ
