= Georg Treu =

German archaeologist (1843–1921)

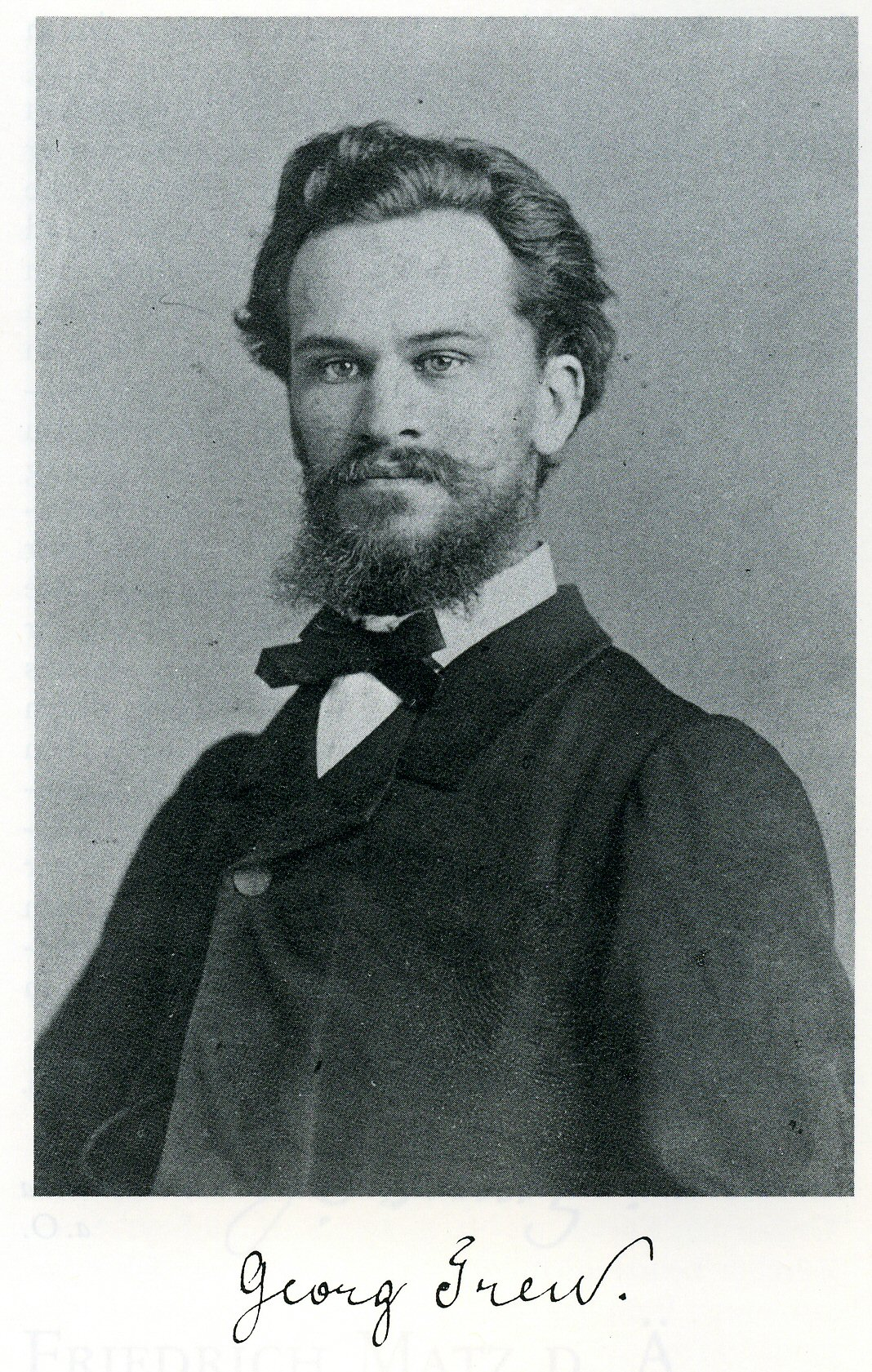
Portrait and signature (c.1880–1885)

Georg Treu (29 March 1843 (OS), Saint Petersburg – 5 October 1921, Dresden) was a Classical archaeologist and curator of the sculpture collection at the Albertinum.

== Life ==
He began as a theology student at the Imperial University of Dorpat, then took up archaeology at the Humboldt University of Berlin. In 1866, he became a research assistant in the antiquities collection at the Hermitage Museum and received his PhD in 1874 from the University of Göttingen. He returned to Berlin, where he became a lecturer at the University and Assistant Director for the Berlin State Museums.

During the excavations in Olympia from 1875 to 1881, he was appointed temporary manager. In 1882, he was appointed to replace Hermann Theodor Hettner as curator of the sculpture collection at the Albertinum and served in this position until 1915. He worked to expand the collection, acquiring vases and works in terracotta as well as sculptures.

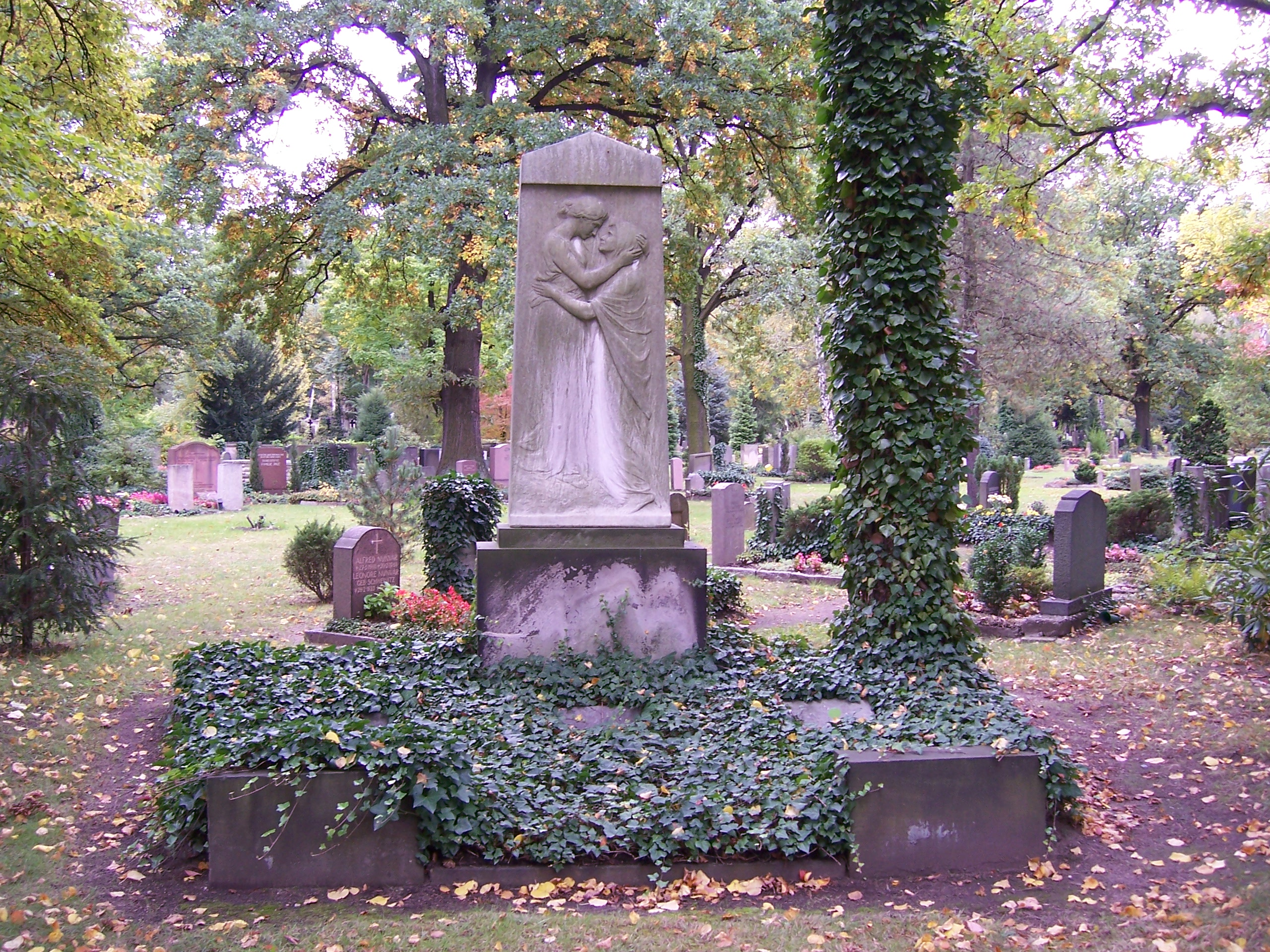
Treu's grave at Johannisfriedhof

When the Cabinet of Curiosities belonging to the former Electorate of Saxony was broken up, he took the opportunity to integrate Renaissance and Baroque sculptures into the collection. Several works were acquired through his contacts with contemporary artists such as Auguste Rodin, Constantin Meunier and Max Klinger, adding a modern perspective. In 1891, he opened a collection of casts, which served as a model when Ivan Vladimirovich Tsvetayev established the Pushkin Museum. Finally, in 1900, he opened the Sammlung Treus (Treu's Collection) to document the history of sculpture.

In addition to his duties at the Albertinum, he taught at the Dresden Academy of Fine Arts and the Royal Saxon Polytechnic, where he also managed the art collection. He received an honorary doctorate from the University of Aberdeen in 1906 and one from the Polytechnic in 1913.

His grave in the Johannisfriedhof is decorated with a relief by the sculptor Robert Diez. The area between the Albertinum and the Art Academy was named the Georg-Treu-Platz in his honor.

== Selected writings ==
- Griechische Tongefäße in Statuetten- und Büstenform (Greek Pottery in Statue and Bust Form), 1875. Available (print-on-demand) from the University of Michigan Library.
- Hermes mit dem Dionysosknaben (Hermes and the Infant Dionysus), 1878
- Die Bildwerke von Olympia in Stein und Ton (The Sculptures of Olympia in Stone and Clay), 1894
- Max Klinger als Bildhauer (Max Klinger as a sculptor). In: Pan 5. Issue 1, 1899/1900, S. 27–35. (Special Edition, Leipzig/Berlin, 1900.) Reissued in book form by the Nabu Press (2013) ISBN 1-2933-9140-9
- Hellenische Stimmungen in der Bildhauerei (Hellenic Moods in Sculpture), 1910
