= Gottlob Frick =

German opera singer

Frick c. 1960

Gottlob Frick (28 July 1906 – 18 August 1994) was a German operatic bass. He was known for his wide repertory including Wagner and Mozart roles. Some of his most celebrated roles were Wagnerian villains such as Hunding and Hagen in Der Ring des Nibelungen, but others were noble characters like Sarastro in The Magic Flute or Gurnemanz in Parsifal or comic figures such as Osmin in Die Entführung aus dem Serail or Falstaff in The Merry Wives of Windsor. He sang at the leading European opera houses in the 1950s and 1960s and recorded all his major roles.

== Life and career ==
Frick was born in Ölbronn, Württemberg on 28 July 1906, the youngest of thirteen children of a Swabian head forester and gamekeeper. In the mid-1920s he attended the Stuttgart Conservatory, studying under Fritz Windgassen (father of Frick’s contemporary, the tenor Wolfgang Windgassen). From 1927 he sang in the chorus of Stuttgart Opera and in 1930 he auditioned for Siegfried Wagner, director of the Bayreuth Festival, who engaged him for small parts.

Frick's first major solo role was at the Landestheater, Coburg in 1934–35 as Daland in Der fliegende Holländer. He moved to the opera companies in Freiburg and then Königsberg where he was heard by Karl Böhm, then director of the Dresden State Opera, who engaged him immediately. Frick remained in the Dresden company for ten years, until 1950. He had a varied repertoire there, including bass roles in works by Mozart, Beethoven, Weber, Nicolai and Wagner, and non-German operas by, among others, Tchaikovsky and Verdi, including the latter's Don Carlos in which King Philip was Frick's favourite operatic role. Then, as in most of his career, he usually sang in German.

In 1950 Frick moved to the Deutsche Oper Berlin, but his growing international career took him to leading houses throughout Europe. He first sang at Covent Garden in 1951, as Fafner, Hunding and Hagen in the four operas of Der Ring des Nibelungen, and appeared there frequently in the 1950s and 1960s. He also appeared at Bayreuth, Salzburg, the Vienna State Opera and La Scala. From 1954 for the rest of his career his operatic home base was the Bavarian State Opera in Munich. He sang at the Metropolitan Opera, New York, in the four Ring operas in 1961–62. He officially retired from the operatic stage in 1970, but made occasional appearances after that, including what the critic John Steane called "his triumphant return to Covent Garden" in 1971 as Gurnemanz in Parsifal.

According to The Times, Frick, who had "one of those saturnine, dark voices that seem peculiar to the German-speaking countries", had:

... a range of two octaves, from the low D of Mozart's Osmin up to a high G in the baritone register. It was a flexible, immediately recognisable instrument which its owner used with the utmost intelligence, as can be heard on his many discs.

In his A to Z of Singers, David Patmore quotes the conductor Wilhelm Furtwängler's description of Frick’s voice as "the blackest bass in Germany", and calls this "a most apt description of its beautiful, velvet quality". Patmore adds that Frick’s "great musicianship, humanity and wit" made him an ideal interpreter of the major parts in the bass repertoire. Although Frick was known for his portrayal of Wagnerian villains such as Hunding and Hagen in the Ring, he also played noble characters including Sarastro in The Magic Flute and Gurnemanz in Parsifal or comic figures such as Osmin in Die Entführung aus dem Serail or Falstaff in The Merry Wives of Windsor. Steane wrote of him, "There is no forcing in his singing, and it is all firm as a rock. Whether benevolently enthusiastic as the Landgrave, or soft and intimate in Pogner's music with Eva, or voicing the dark menace of Hagen, he is king of his kind".

Frick died in Pforzheim in Baden-Württemberg on 18 August 1994, aged 88.

== Recordings ==
According to Patmore, Frick's recorded legacy, of both commercial and live recordings, is substantial and does him full justice. Grove's Dictionary of Music and Musicians comments that Frick recorded all his major roles. Among his recordings were Osmin first for Sir Thomas Beecham and again for Josef Krips, Sarastro for Otto Klemperer and Rocco (in Fidelio) for Klemperer and Ferenc Fricsay. He also recorded the Hermit (in Weber's Der Freischütz) for Joseph Keilberth and Kaspar for Lovro von Matačić, The Peasant (in Carl Orff's Die Kluge) for both Wolfgang Sawallisch and Kurt Eichhorn, Kecal (in The Bartered Bride), The Commendatore for Giulini, Pogner and King Henry for Rudolf Kempe, King Marke, Daland and the Landgrave for Franz Konwitschny, and Hunding, Hagen and Gurnemanz for Georg Solti. When planning the first studio recording of Götterdämmerung, made in 1964, the producer John Culshaw considered Frick one of the three indispensable cast members: "Nilsson, Windgassen and Gottlob Frick (Hagen) had to be in the cast or there was no point in starting". In Steane's view, it is for this recording that Frick will be best remembered – "the embodiment of evil".

== Sources ==
- Culshaw, John (1967). Ring Resounding. London: Secker & Warburg. ISBN 978-0-436-11800-5.
- Patmore, David (2015). A to Z of Singers. Hong Kong: Naxos. ISBN 978-1-84379-072-3.
- Steane, J. B (1993) [1974]. The Grand Tradition: Seventy Years of Singing on Record (second ed.). London: Duckworth. ISBN 978-0-71-560661-2.
