= Ludwig Hartmann (composer) =

German composer and music critic (1836–1910)

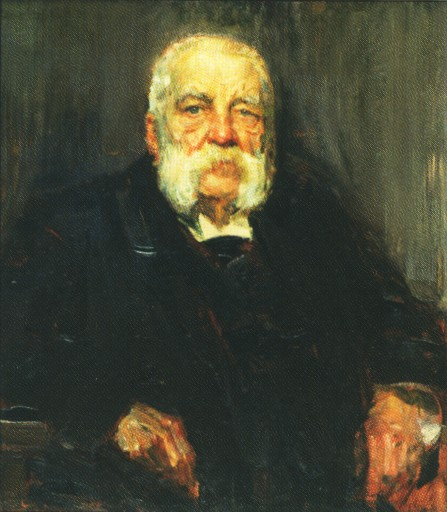
Robert Sterl: Ludwig Hartmann (1908), Dresden City Art Gallery

Friedrich Wilhelm Ludwig Hartmann (3 August 1836 – 14 February 1910) was a German composer and music critic.

== Life ==
Born in Neuss, Hartmann was the son of music director in Neuss, Friedrich Hartmann. He was educated at the University of Music and Theatre Leipzig under Moscheles and Hauptmann and then went to Weimar as a pupil of Franz Liszt. He appeared at a concert given by Schröder-Devrient at Dresden in 1859. From 1859 until his death, he lived in Dresden. Latterly he was almost exclusively employed in musical journalism.

Hartmann died in Dresden at the age of 73.

His grave is in the Hartmann family grave in the Johannis cemetery in Dresden. His wife Louise, daughter of the lawyer Julius von Kirchmann, also found her final resting place there.

== Work ==
Of Hartmann's compositions, his lieds and ballades in particular have been widely circulated, but he was also successful as a composer of piano music and pianist. As a music writer and critic, he became respected in Dresden. In his more than 50 years of activity, he championed Richard Wagner and Richard Strauss and supported young singers at the Semperoper. He published various writings about Wagner and contributed numerous articles to periodical literature.

- König Helga, opera
