= Hugo Jüngst =

German composer and choir-leader

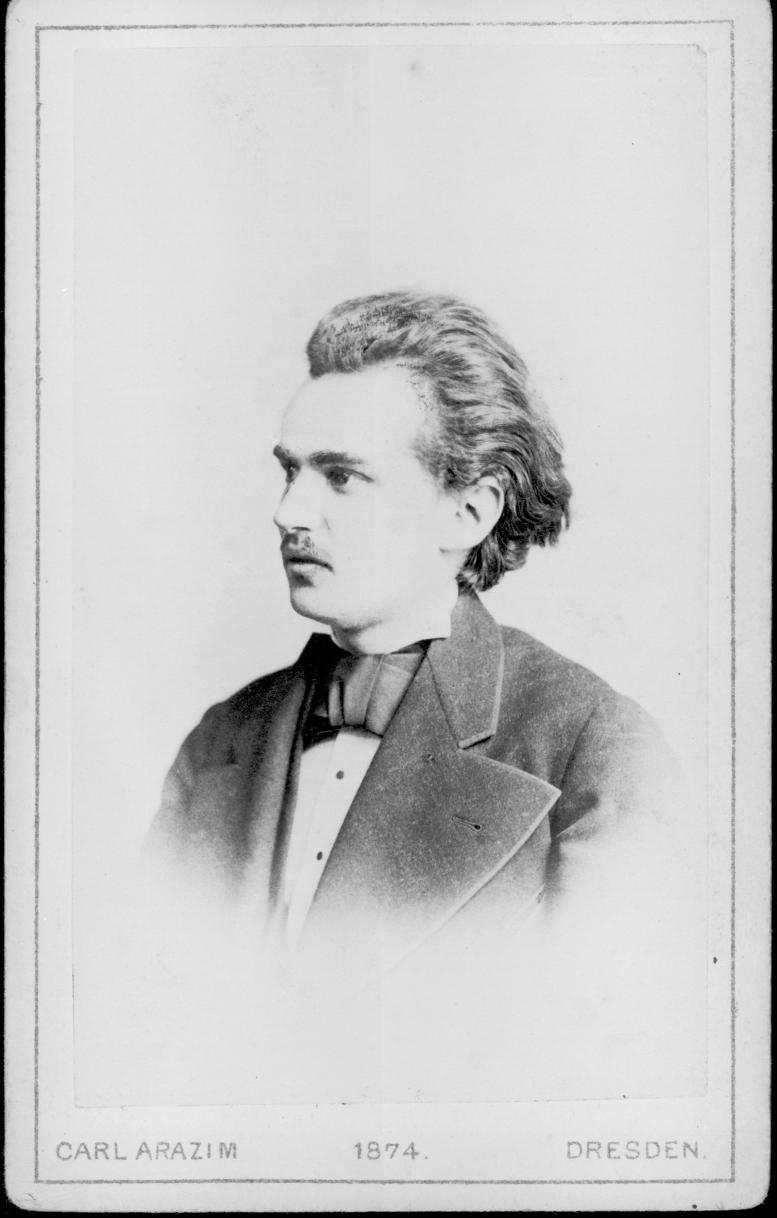
Hugo Richard Jüngst.

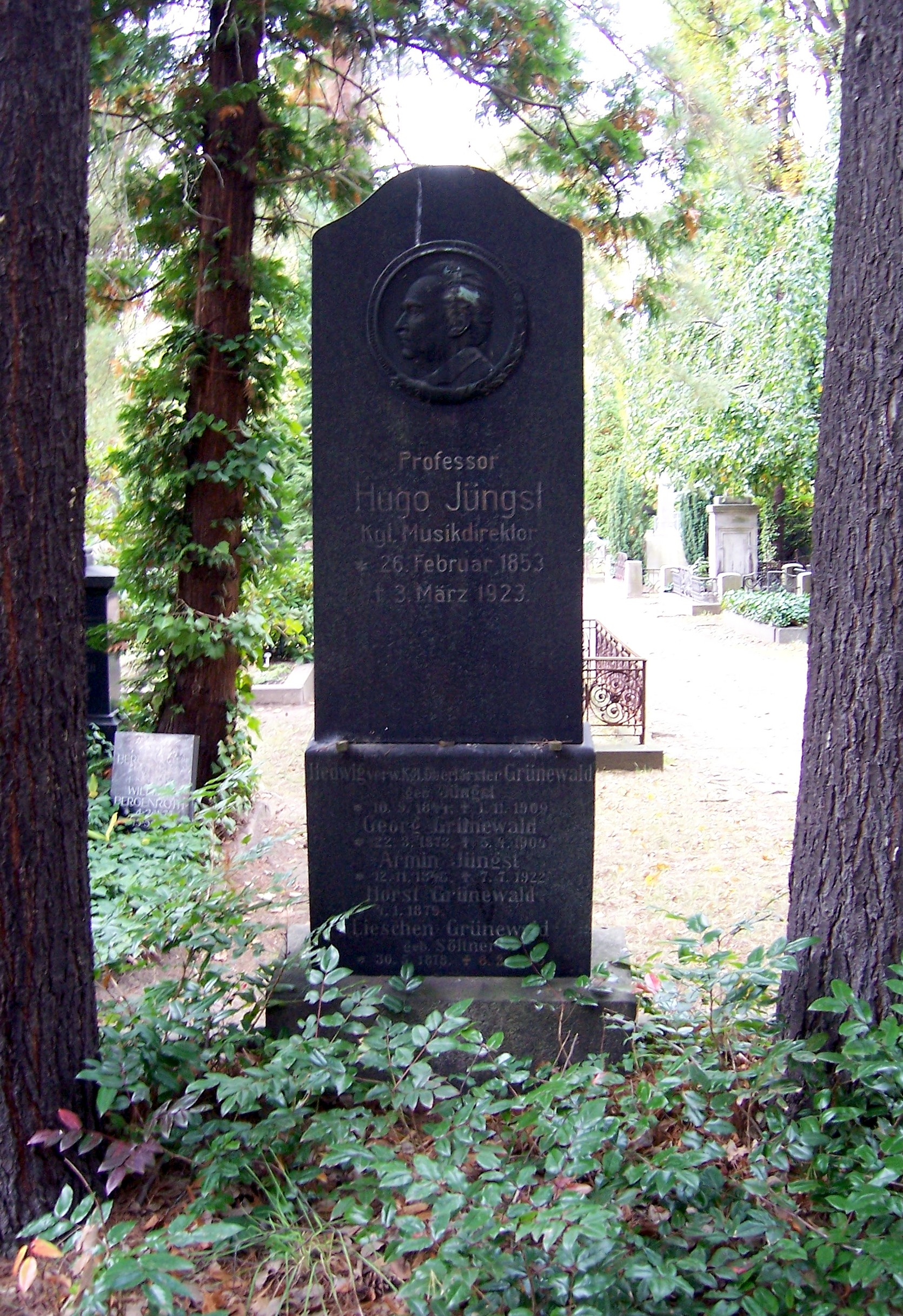
His grave at Johannisfriedhof, Dresden

Hugo Richard Jüngst (26 February 1853 – 3 March 1923) was a German composer and choir director. He wrote over 300 pieces, mainly for male choirs.

Born in Dresden, Jüngst was a student of Julius Rietz. In 1876, he started the Dresden Men's Choir and conducted it until 1903. He received several awards during his life and performed internationally in Europe as well as the United States.

About 200 of his compositions for male choirs were published, including a cappella and accompanied songs. Jűngst became well known for his arrangements of foreign folk songs, such as "Spin! Spin!".

Most of the original manuscripts and places where he worked were lost during the bombing of Dresden in 1945.
