= Anastasia Tsvetayeva =

Russian writer

- Анастасия Цветаева
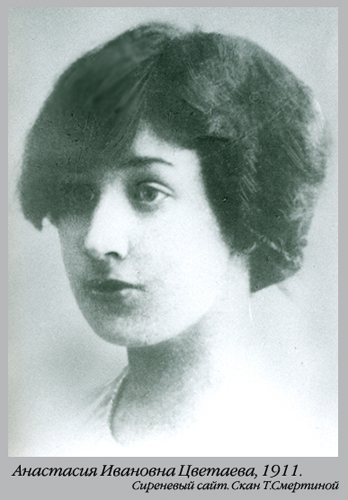
- Koktebel, 1911
- Born: 27 September 1894; Moscow, Russian Empire
- Died: 5 September 1993 (aged 98); Moscow, Russia
- Occupations: Writer; poet; memoirist
- Writing career
- Notable works: Memoirs, 1971

Anastasia Ivanovna Tsvetayeva (Russian: Анастасия Ивановна Цветаева; 27 September 1894 – 5 September 1993) was a Russian writer, poet and memoirist, a younger sister of Marina Tsvetayeva.

Tsvetayeva started to write earlier than her sister; she debuted in 1915 with the book Korolevskiye razmyshleniya (King's Musings), followed by Dym, Dym, Dym (Smoke, Smoke, Smoke, 1916), both praised by, among others, Boris Pasternak. In 1921 she became a member of the Union of Soviet Writers, on the recommendations of Mikhail Gershenzon and Nikolai Berdyayev. Her 1927 book Golodnay epopeya (The Famine Epic) remained unpublished, as did the novel SOS or the Constellation of Scorpio. Both were later confiscated and destroyed by the NKVD, along with numerous other texts, mostly fairytales and short stories.

In 1937, Tsvetayeva was arrested, accused of being a member of a Rosicrucian Order. In 1938 she received ten years for counter-revolutionary activities and was sent to the Amurlag. Released in 1947, she was arrested again in 1949 and sent to exile in the Novosibirsk region where she spent the next five years. In labour camps she wrote the novel Amor and in exile Moya Sibir (My Siberia, a collection of diaries, published in 1988). After the return from exile and rehabilitation in 1959 she started working upon a book of memoirs. Anastasia Tsvetayeva's acclaimed Vospominaniya (Memoirs), finished in 1967 and first published in 1971, by Sovetsky Pisatel, made her famous, and remains her best-known work, although later books, Starost i molodost (Old Age and Youth, 1988), Nepostizhimyie (The Incomprehensible) and Neischerpayemoye (The Unfathomable, both 1992) were also lauded by critics and literary historians. Her only book of poetry (Moi edinstvenny sbornik, My Only Collection) came out posthumously, in 1995.

Starting from the early 1960s, she was engaged in trying to establish the location of her sister Marina's grave and worked for the establishment of the Marina Tsvetayeva Museum in Moscow, which opened on 12 September 1992. Anastasia Tsvetayeva died on 5 September 1993, aged 98. She was interred in the Vagankovo Cemetery. In January 2012 the Anastasiya Tsvetayeva Museum opened in Pavlodar, where she spent her first post-exile years in the early 1960s.
