= Siegmund Eibenschütz =

Austrian theatre director and conductor

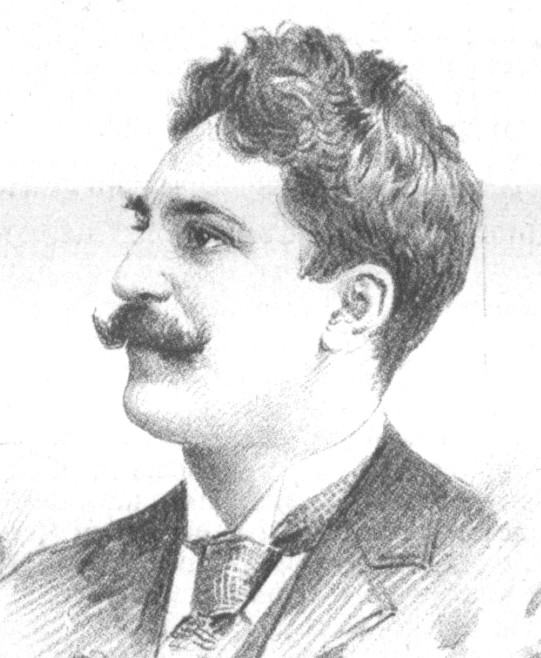
- Siegmund Eibenschütz, 1902
- Born: 19 November 1856; Budapest, Austrian Empire
- Died: 19 February 1922 (aged 65); Vienna, Austria
- Resting place: Lutheran Cemetery Vienna-Simmering
- Education: Franz Liszt Academy of Music
- Occupations: Theatre director, conductor
- Spouse: Dora Keplinger
- Relatives: Ilona Eibenschütz (sister); Riza Eibenschütz (sister); Gina Eibenschütz (sister); Maria Theodora Eibenschütz (daughter)

Siegmund Eibenschütz (19 November 1856 – 19 February 1922) was an Austrian theatre director and conductor.

== Life ==
Born in Budapest, Austrian Empire, Eibenschütz studied at the Franz Liszt Academy of Music with Franz Liszt, Robert Volkmann and Ferenc Erkel. Together with his sister Ilona, who was an important piano virtuoso, he undertook concert tours throughout Europe. Finally he settled in Vienna and became an opera répétiteur in the school of Luise Meyer-Dustmann with Pauline Lucca.

Since 1887 he conducted at all major theaters in Austria and in 1895 he joined the Theater an der Wien for 10 years. His wife was the famous soubrette Dora Keplinger. In 1907 he became partner of Andreas Amann, the director of the Carltheater, which he finally directed from 1908 till his death. Under his direction only operettas were performed at the Carltheater and of 19 works there were only 6 which were performed less than 100 times in a row. Among the better known works were Franz Lehár's Gipsy Love and Oskar Nedbal's Polenblut.

Eibenschütz died in Vienna at the age of 55 and was buried at the Lutheran Cemetery Vienna-Simmering (VIII, Av. 29)

His sisters were the pianist Ilona Eibenschütz, the opera singer Riza Eibenschütz and the actress Gina Eibenschütz, his daughter the singing teacher Maria Theodora Eibenschütz.
