= Riza Eibenschütz =

Austrian opera singer

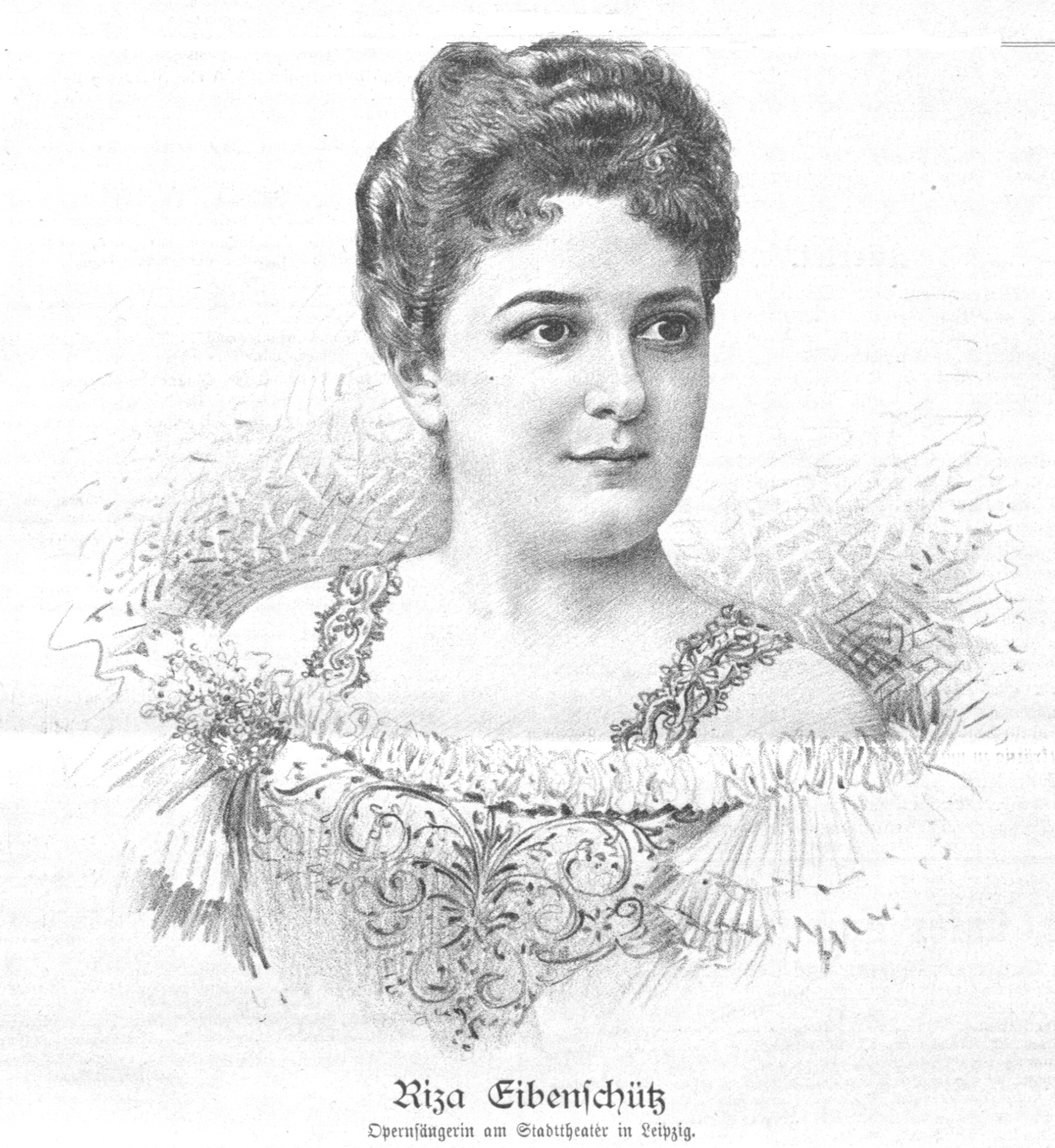
Riza Eibenschütz in 1898

Riza Eibenschütz, married name Riza Malata, (17 February 1870 – 16 January 1947), (Note: See also the OeML (Weblinks), the year of birth and death varies in some sources (1868/1870/1971/1873 respectively 1946/1947/1948)) was an Austrian operatic soprano and contralto.

== Life ==
Born in Budapest, Eibenschütz was the daughter of a merchant. She studied singing at the Konservatorium Wien Privatuniversität with Josef Gänsbacher and Marianne Brandt. Her large vocal range allowed her to sing both soprano and alto parts during her subsequent career as an opera singer.

Eibenschütz received her first engagement at the Opernhaus Leipzig, where she made her debut as Selica (L'Africaine) in 1894. After that she sang for two years at the Stadttheater Strasbourg. In 1897 she went on a two-year North American tour with the Damrosch Opera Company. Afterwards she returned to the Leipzig Opera, to whose ensemble she belonged from 1899 to 1902. On 15 February 1902 she appeared at the premiere of the opera Orestes by Felix Weingartner. In 1901 she had a guest appearance in Munich.

In 1902 Eibenschütz became a member of the Semperoper in Dresden. There she sang among others at the world premieres of Das war ich! by Leo Blech (6 October 1902), Odysseus Tod by August Bungert (30 October 1903) as well as R. Strauss' operas Salome (9 December 1905), Elektra (25 January 1909) and Der Rosenkavalier (as Marianne Leitmetzerin, 26 January 1911). She had several guest appearances, among others at the court opera of Berlin (1892 and 1908).

Among Eibenschütz' most successful roles were Brünnhilde (Der Ring des Nibelungen), Senta (Der Fliegende Holländer), Rezia (Oberon), Rachel in Halévy's (La Juive) and Leonore in Fidelio. There are several recordings of her, among others published by His Master's Voice (Dresden 1908) and Odeon.

After her departure from the stage Eibenschütz worked as a singing teacher in Vienna. Among her pupils was the soprano Hanny Steffek (1927–2010).

Eibenschütz was married to the conductor Oskar Malata (1875–1959). She died in Perchtoldsdorf near Vienna at age 76.

Her siblings were the conductor Siegmund Eibenschütz, the pianist Ilona Eibenschütz and the actress Gina Eibenschüt, her niece the singing teacher Maria Theodora Eibenschütz.
