= Der Rosenkavalier =

1911 opera by Richard Strauss

- Opera by Richard Strauss
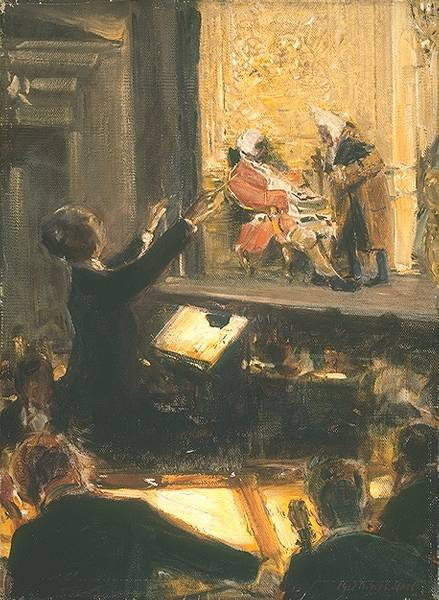
- Ernst Edler von Schuch conducting Der Rosenkavalier (1912), by Robert Sterl
- Librettist: Hugo von Hofmannsthal
- Language: German
- Premiere: 26 January 1911; Königliches Opernhaus, Dresden

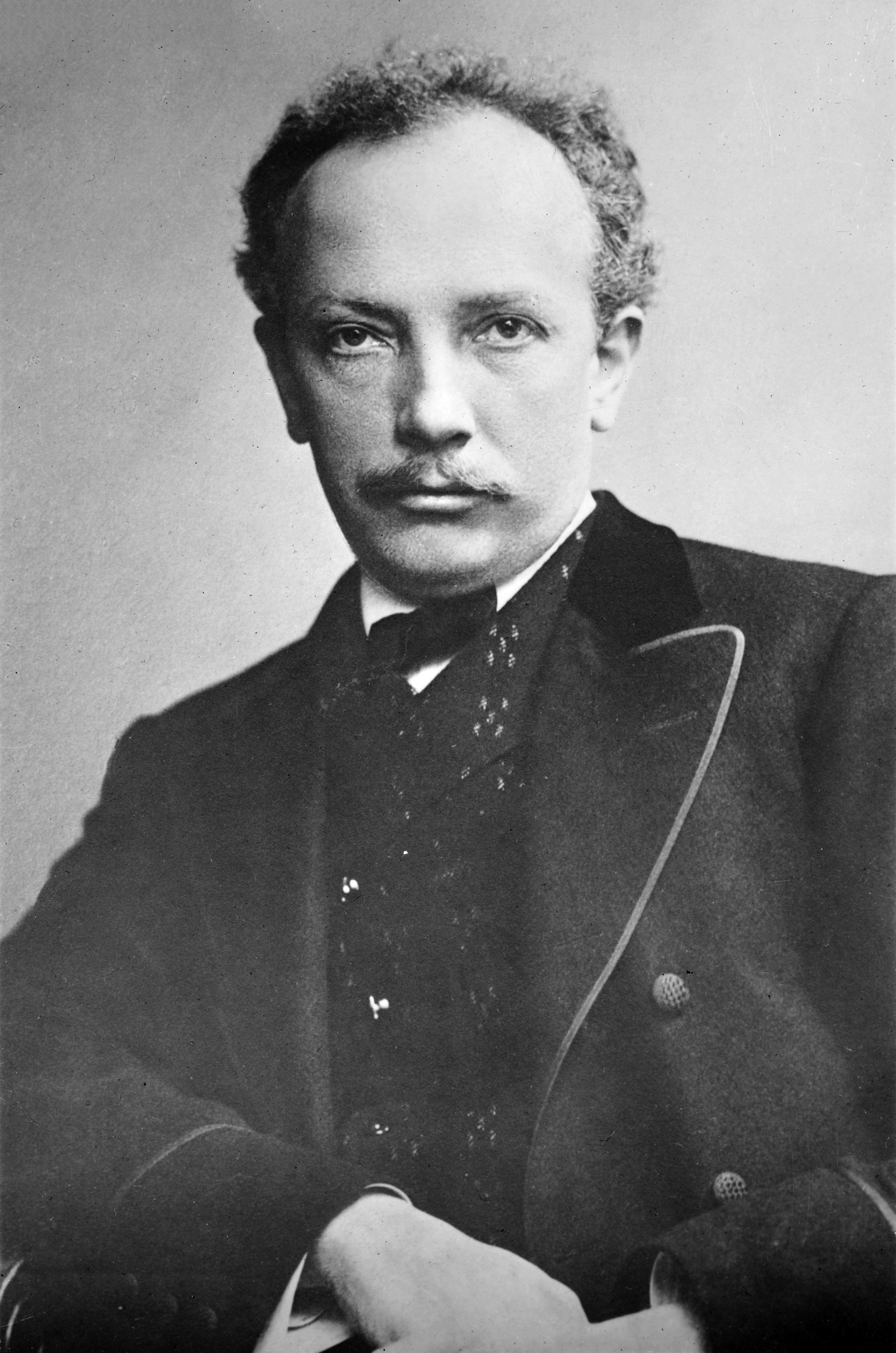
Richard Strauss in 1910

Der Rosenkavalier (The Knight of the Rose or The Rose-Bearer), Op. 59, is a comic opera in three acts by Richard Strauss to an original German libretto by Hugo von Hofmannsthal. It is loosely adapted from Louvet de Couvrai's novel Les amours du chevalier de Faublas and Molière's comedy Monsieur de Pourceaugnac. It was first performed at the Königliches Opernhaus in Dresden on 26 January 1911 under the direction of Max Reinhardt, with Ernst von Schuch conducting. Until the premiere, the working title was Ochs auf Lerchenau. (The choice of the name Ochs is not accidental, as "Ochs" means "ox", which describes the Baron's manner.)

The opera has four main characters: the aristocratic Marschallin; her 17-year-old lover, Count Octavian Rofrano; known as Quinquin, her brutish cousin Baron Ochs; and Ochs's prospective fiancée, Sophie von Faninal, the daughter of a rich bourgeois. At the Marschallin's suggestion, Octavian acts as Ochs's Rosenkavalier by presenting a ceremonial silver rose to Sophie. But Octavian and Sophie fall in love on the spot, and soon devise a comic intrigue to extricate Sophie from her engagement, with help from the Marschallin, who then yields Octavian to Sophie. Though a comic opera, the work incorporates weighty themes (particularly through the Marschallin's character arc), including infidelity, aging, sexual predation, and selflessness in love.

Der Rosenkavalier is notable for showcasing the female voice, as its protagonists (light lyric soprano Sophie, mezzo-soprano Octavian, and the mature dramatic soprano Marschallin) are written to be portrayed by women, who share several duets as well as a trio at the opera's emotional climax. Some singers have performed two or even all three of these roles over the course of their careers.

There are many recordings of the opera and it is regularly performed.

== Composition ==
Richard Strauss first met Hugo von Hofmannsthal in 1899 in Berlin. Strauss was subsequently impressed by Hofmannsthal's play Elektra (1903), and adapted it into an opera that premiered on 25 January 1909. During that process, they agreed to collaborate on a new project that would be more comedic in tone. After Strauss rejected Hofmannsthal's comedy Christinas Heimreise and the plays of Molière yielded little fruit, Hofmannsthal visited Harry Graf Kessler in Weimar. Over the course of a few days in February 1909, Hofmannsthal and Kessler drafted a scenario inspired by a 1907 operetta that Kessler had seen in Paris: L'Ingénu libertin by playwright Louis Artus and composer Claude Terrasse.

Strauss approved the plot outline and work began in earnest. Act I's text was written in February–March 1909, with its music finished in May. Through the summer, Strauss composed Act II, collaborating with Hofmannsthal to add more comedy and plot twists. By spring 1910, the first two acts were printed and Hofmannsthal had finished the libretto. Strauss finished the music of the final act on 26 September 1910.

The first production was slated to be directed by the Dresden Opera's Georg Toller, who had staged the world premiere of Strauss's Elektra, but the creators had subsequently been impressed by the Vienna production of Elektra with sets designed by Alfred Roller (director of the Vienna Kunstgewerbeschule) and lost faith in Toller. Strauss and Hofmannsthal commissioned Roller to design sets and costumes for Der Rosenkavalier and arranged for his designs to be published in an illustrated prompt book that all productions would be obligated to use. They also controversially recruited Max Reinhardt to assist with rehearsals as a "shadow director" or replacement for Toller, although Toller remained the sole credited director.

After the dark and dramatic style of Elektra, Strauss tried to use lighter music with a more lyrical style in this opera. Therefore, the composer mixed Romantic orchestration with elements inspired by classical Viennese musical traditions. This was a distinctive feature of the score, in addition to using frequent Viennese waltz rhythms. This is anachronistic because the story takes place in the 1740s, and the waltz only became famous in Vienna during the early 19th century. Strauss thus intentionally used the waltz to create the nostalgic atmosphere associated with imperial Vienna instead of strict historical realism.

== Performance history ==
The tenor Renato Ercolani as Valzacchi, 1960.

=== Premiere ===
Der Rosenkavalier premiered on 26 January 1911 in Dresden conducted by Ernst von Schuch, who had conducted the premieres of Strauss's Feuersnot, Salome and Elektra. Soprano Margarethe Siems (Strauss's first Chrysothemis) sang the Marschallin, in a turn that represented the pinnacle of her career, while Minnie Nast portrayed Sophie and Eva von der Osten sang the breeches role of Octavian.

From the start, Der Rosenkavalier was nothing short of a triumph: tickets to the premiere reportedly sold out almost immediately, resulting in a financial boom for the house. Though some critics took issue with Strauss's anachronistic use of waltz music, the public embraced the opera unconditionally. Rosenkavalier became Strauss's most popular opera during his lifetime and remains a staple of operatic repertoire today.

=== International success ===
Within two months of its premiere, the work was translated into Italian and performed at La Scala. The Italian cast, led by conductor Tullio Serafin, included Lucrezia Bori as Octavian, Ines Maria Ferraris as Sophie, and Pavel Ludikar as Ochs. The opera's Austrian premiere was given by the Vienna Court Opera on the following 8 April, under Franz Schalk's baton, with Lucie Weidt as Marschallin, Gertrude Förstel as Sophie substituting for Selma Kurz, Marie Gutheil-Schoder as Octavian and Richard Mayr as Ochs. The work reached the Teatro Costanzi in Rome seven months later on 14 November with Egisto Tango conducting Hariclea Darclée as the Marschallin and Conchita Supervía as Octavian.

The United Kingdom premiere of Der Rosenkavalier occurred at the Royal Opera House in London on 29 January 1913, produced by T. C. Fairbairn. Thomas Beecham conducted the performance and the cast included Margarethe Siems as the Marschallin and Caroline Hatchard as Sophie. The United States premiere took place at the Metropolitan Opera on the following 9 December in a production conducted by Alfred Hertz. The cast included Frieda Hempel as the Marschallin, Margarethe Arndt-Ober as Octavian, and Anna Case as Sophie. A number of Italian theatres produced the work for the first time in the 1920s, including the Teatro Lirico Giuseppe Verdi (1921), Teatro Regio di Torino (1923), Teatro di San Carlo (1925), and the Teatro Carlo Felice (1926).

Der Rosenkavalier reached Monaco on 21 March 1926 when it was performed by the Opéra de Monte-Carlo at the Salle Garnier in a French translation. The performance starred Gabrielle Ritter-Ciampi as the Marschallin and Vanni Marcoux as Faninal. 1926 also saw the premiere of a film of the opera. The French premiere of the opera itself came in 1927 at the Palais Garnier in Paris on 11 February 1927 with conductor Philippe Gaubert. The cast included Germaine Lubin as Octavian. Brussels heard the work for the first time at La Monnaie on 15 December 1927 with Clara Clairbert as Sophie.

The Salzburg Festival mounted Der Rosenkavalier for the first time on 12 August 1929 in a production conducted by Clemens Krauss. The cast included Lotte Lehmann as the Marschallin and Marta Fuchs as Annina. Other first productions at notable houses, opera festivals, and music ensembles include: Teatro Massimo (5 March 1932), Philadelphia Orchestra (30 November 1934), San Francisco Opera (16 October 1940), Philadelphia Opera Company (2 December 1941), Maggio Musicale Fiorentino (2 May 1942), La Fenice (20 April 1943), Festival dei Due Mondi (19 June 1964), Teatro Comunale di Bologna (19 November 1965), Lyric Opera of Chicago (25 September 1970), and the New York City Opera (19 November 1973), among many others. It was first presented in Australia as a radio broadcast on 7 January 1936, featuring Florence Austral, but the first Australian stage production was not until 1972, by the Australian Opera in Melbourne, conducted by Sir Edward Downes. The first New Zealand performance was at the International Festival of the Arts in Wellington in 2002.

== Roles ==
Roles, voice types, premiere cast
Role	Voice type	Premiere cast, 26 January 1911 Conductor: Ernst von Schuch
The Marschallin, Princess Marie Thérèse von Werdenberg	soprano	Margarethe Siems
Octavian, Count Rofrano, her young lover	mezzo-soprano (en travesti)	Eva von der Osten
Baron Ochs auf Lerchenau, the Marschallin's cousin	bass	Karl Perron
Sophie von Faninal	high soprano or soubrette	Minnie Nast
Herr von Faninal, Sophie's rich parvenu father	high baritone	Karl Scheidemantel
Marianne, Sophie's duenna	high soprano	Riza Eibenschütz
Valzacchi, an intriguer	tenor	Hans Rüdiger
Annina, his niece and partner	contralto	Erna Freund
A notary	bass	Ludwig Ermold
An Italian singer	high tenor	Fritz Soot
Three noble orphans	soprano, mezzo- soprano, contralto	Marie Keldorfer, Gertrude Sachse, Paula Seiring
A milliner	soprano	Elisa Stünzner
A vendor of pets	tenor	Josef Pauli
Faninal's Major-Domo	tenor	Fritz Soot
A police inspector	bass	Julius Puttlitz
The Marschallin's Major-Domo	tenor	Anton Erl
An innkeeper	tenor	Josef Pauli
Four lackeys	tenors, basses	Josef Pauli, Wilhelm Quidde, Rudolf Schmalnauer, Robert Büssel
Four waiters	tenor, basses	Wilhelm Quidde, Rudolf Schmalnauer, Robert Büssel, Franz Nebuschka
Mohammed, the Marschallin's black page	silent	
A flutist, a cook, a hairdresser and his assistant, a scholar, a noble widow	all silent	
Servants, hired deceivers, children, constables

== Synopsis ==
Time: 1740s, in the first years of the reign of Empress Maria Theresa
Place: Vienna

=== Act 1 ===
Hogarth's The Countess's Morning Levee (ca. 1744), the inspiration for the Marschallin's morning reception

The Marschallin's bedroom

The opera's Einleitung (Introduction) depicts a night of sex between Princess Marie Therese von Werdenberg (known as the Marschallin, the title given to a Field Marshal's wife) and her much younger lover, Count Octavian Rofrano. The curtain rises to show them lounging in bed together just before daybreak ("Wie du warst! Wie du bist"). Loud voices are soon heard outside, and the Marschallin has Octavian hide, believing that her husband has returned early from a hunting trip. Octavian emerges in a skirt and bonnet ("Befehl'n fürstli' Gnad'n, i bin halt noch nit recht...") and tries to sneak away, but the Marschallin's country cousin, Baron Ochs auf Lerchenau, bursts in through the same door.

The Baron is newly engaged to Sophie Faninal ("Selbstverständlich empfängt mich Ihro Gnaden"), a wealthy merchant's daughter. This does not keep him from making lewd comments at the disguised Octavian. Ochs has come to ask two favors: he wants to borrow his cousin's notary to write the marriage contract, and he wants her to recommend a young nobleman to serve as his Rosenkavalier ("Knight of the Rose"), who will deliver the traditional silver engagement rose to Sophie. The Marschallin instructs "Mariandl" to fetch Octavian's miniature portrait and present it to the Baron. Ochs readily accepts Octavian as his Rosenkavalier, deciding that the "maid" must be that young count's "bastard sister", then insists that the Marschallin allow "Mariandl" to come and work for his new bride. She refuses as politely as possible and finally dismisses the "maid".

A busy reception scene ensues as the room fills with vendors and supplicants to the Marschallin ("Drei arme adelige Waisen"), who ignores the former and aids the latter. A tenor sent by the Portuguese ambassador serenades her ("Di rigori armato") while Ochs sits down with the notary. Two Italian intriguers, Valzacchi and Annina, present scandal sheets for sale, which the Marschallin coldly declines. Ochs tries to stipulate a gift from Sophie's family consisting of all their properties, free from mortgages, and quickly loses patience with the notary's attempts to explain that this is illegal. Amid all the activity, the Marschallin remarks to her hairdresser: "My dear Hippolyte, today you have made me look like an old woman" ("Mein lieber Hippolyte"). This so disturbs her that she orders the room to be emptied. As the people file out, Valzacchi and Annina offer Ochs their spying services. He asks whether they know anything about "Mariandl"; they lie and claim to know all about her.

Now alone, the Marschallin ponders her waning youth and the unhappiness of her forced marriage, perceiving the same in store for Sophie ("Da geht er hin..."). Octavian returns, dressed again in men's clothes ("Ach, du bist wieder da"). When he sees that the Marschallin is out of sorts, he assumes it is from her earlier fear that he might have been discovered. But she is still thinking of the passage of time (a clock is heard chiming 13 times) ("Die Zeit, die ist ein sonderbar Ding") and tells him that, very soon, he will leave her for someone younger and prettier. Octavian reacts with frustration, and the Marschallin turns him away. Too late, she realizes that she has neglected to kiss him goodbye. With nothing else to be done, she summons her young page, Mohammed, to take the silver rose to Octavian, then stares pensively into her hand mirror (or similar) as the curtain falls.

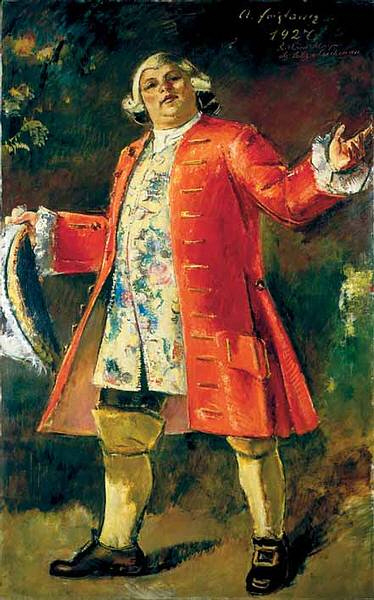
1927 portrait of Richard Mayr as Ochs by Anton Faistauer. Mayr sang this role 149 times in Vienna, Salzburg and London.

=== Act 2 ===
The von Faninals' palace

The next day, Herr von Faninal exultantly and Sophie nervously await the Rosenkavalier's arrival ("Ein ernster Tag, ein grosser Tag!"). Following tradition, Faninal departs before the Knight appears, saying that he will return with the bridegroom. Sophie prays to keep her sense of humility through all the rapid changes happening in her life, but she is repeatedly interrupted by her duenna, Marianne, who reports from the window on the Rosenkavalier's elaborate entourage ("In dieser feierlichen Stunde der Prüfung"). Octavian arrives with great pomp, dressed all in silver, and presents the silver rose to Sophie ("Mir ist die Ehre widerfahren..."). She smells it, saying it is as sweet as a greeting from Heaven itself. Instantly smitten, Octavian joins her avowal that they will remember this moment until death.

They settle into a chaperoned conversation. Sophie reveals that she already knows Octavian's full name – Octavian Maria Ehrenreich Bonaventura Fernand Hyacinth Rofrano – from studying the catalogue of Austrian nobility to prepare for her marriage. She even knows his nickname, Quinquin, which only intimate friends (including the Marschallin) call him. She adds that she likes him very much. Ochs then enters with Faninal ("Jetzt aber kommt mein Herr Zukünftiger") and wastes no time revealing his character to the bride, loudly examining Sophie's body and comparing her to "an unbroken filly" when she protests. Once he leaves the room with Faninal to finalize the marriage contract, Sophie and Octavian quickly agree that she will not marry the Baron under any circumstances.

The young lovers' rapturous duet ("Mit Ihren Augen voll Tränen") is soon interrupted by Valzacchi and Annina, who surprise them and call for Ochs. Octavian challenges the Baron to a duel. Ochs runs forward, scratches his arm on the point of Octavian's drawn sword, and screams so that Faninal and the rest of the household come rushing in. Sophie begs her father to call off the wedding, to no avail: Octavian is asked to leave, and Sophie is sent to her room. Ochs is left on the divan, his arm in a sling, nursing a bottle of Hippocras and fantasizing revenge against Octavian. But Annina brings him something that raises his spirits much more quickly: a letter signed by "Mariandl", asking for a tryst. At this, Ochs forgets his sling and waltzes across the stage, ignoring Annina's hints for a tip – and missing her quiet promise to get even ("Da lieg' ich!").

=== Act 3 ===
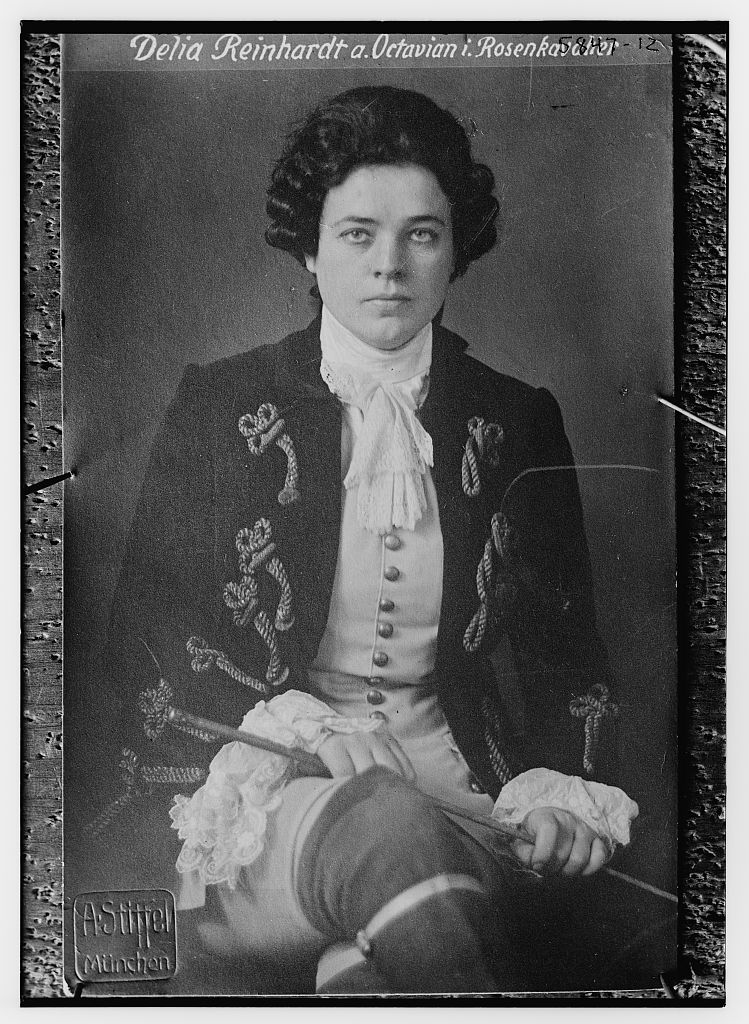
Delia Reinhardt as Octavian c. 1923

A private room in a shabby inn

Fed up with the Baron, Valzacchi and Annina help Octavian prepare a trap the next evening. Elaborate preparations are seen in pantomime before Ochs arrives with "Mariandl", ready for a cozy dinner at a table set for two.

Ochs is disturbed by "Mariandl's" uncanny resemblance to his nemesis Octavian, and keeps catching glimpses of strange apparitions in the room. A disguised Annina bursts in, calling Ochs her husband and the father of her (numerous) children, who crowd around him, crying, "Papa! Papa!" The Baron calls for the police; to his unpleasant surprise, the vice squad treats him with suspicion, and Valzacchi claims not to know him. The police inspector asks about the "woman" accompanying him, and Ochs lies that "she" is his fiancée, Sophie Faninal – just in time for Herr von Faninal to arrive, demanding to know why Ochs's messenger (presumably Valzacchi) has summoned him to this disreputable place. When asked if "Mariandl" is his daughter, Faninal retorts in a rage that his daughter is outside. Sophie enters, confirming this assertion, and her apoplectic father staggers out, leaning on her shoulder.

"Mariandl" now offers to make a statement in private, and retires behind a screen with the Police Inspector. Soon Ochs sees articles of women's clothing coming into view. He rages against the vice squad, but is interrupted by the Marschallin's arrival. The Police Inspector greets her before clearing the room, and she explains to the Baron that he has been fooled. Sophie returns and tells Ochs that their engagement is off; Octavian emerges, and the Marschallin confirms that Octavian, Valzacchi, Annina, and others set up a "masquerade" to break his engagement. Ochs, glancing back and forth between Octavian and the Marschallin, now grasps the nature of their relationship and implies that he may tell the Marschallin's husband of it, but he is cowed by the Marschallin's force of will (if not the sight of Octavian's sword) and ingloriously departs, pursued by children and bill collectors.

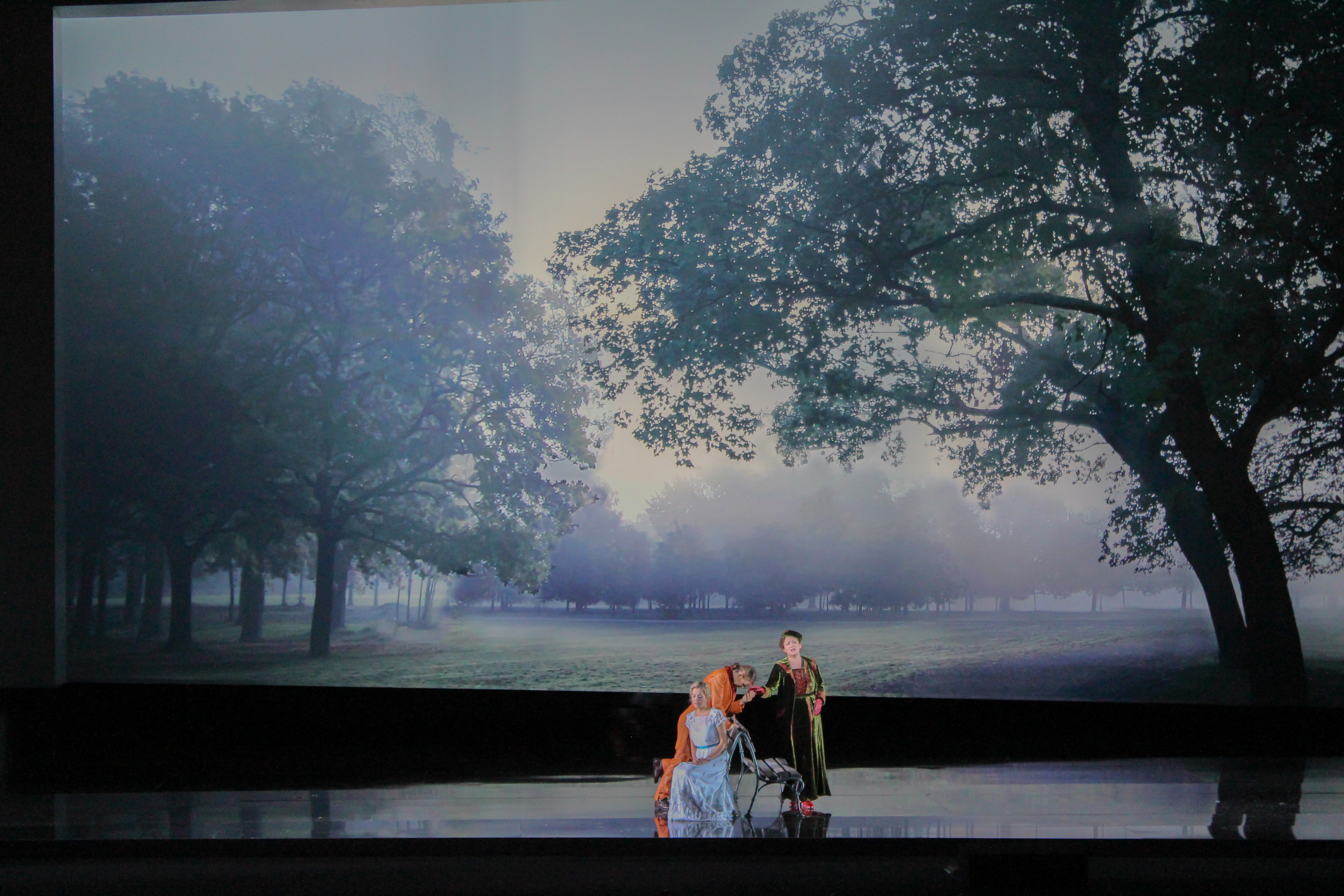
Farewell of Marschallin in act 3, with Mojca Erdmann, Sophie Koch and Krassimira Stoyanova (from left to right), Salzburg Festival 2014

The Marschallin, Sophie, and Octavian are left alone, and Octavian does not know what to do. The Marschallin introduces herself to Sophie, recognizing that the day she feared has come (Trio: "Marie Theres'!" / "Hab' mir's gelobt"), and releases Octavian to be with the woman he loves. She then withdraws, with a promise to Sophie that she will offer Faninal a face-saving ride home in her carriage. As soon as she is gone, Sophie and Octavian run to each other. Faninal and the Marschallin return to find them locked in an embrace. With a last, bittersweet look toward her lost lover, the Marschallin heads for the carriage with Faninal. Sophie and Octavian follow after another brief but ecstatic love duet ("Ist ein Traum" / "Spür' nur dich"). The opera ends with Mohammed trotting in to retrieve Sophie's dropped handkerchief, then racing out again after the others.

== Instrumentation ==
Strauss's score is written for the following:

- Woodwind: 3 flutes, piccolo, 3 oboes, English horn, 9 clarinets (of various keys), basset horn, bass clarinet, 3 bassoons, contrabassoon
- Brass: 4 French horns, 3 trumpets, 3 trombones, bass tuba
- Percussion: timpani, bass drum, 1 pair of crash cymbals, suspended cymbal, triangle, tambourine, glockenspiel, ratchet, tenor drum, snare drum, 1 set of jingle bells, 1 pair of castanets
- Celesta, 2 harps
- Strings: 16 1st violins, 16 2nd violins, 12 violas, 10 cellos, 8 double basses
- Off-stage: 2 flutes, oboe, 3 clarinets, 2 bassoons, 2 French horns, trumpet, snare drum, harmonium, piano, 1st violin, 2nd violin, viola, cello, double bass

== Rosenkavalier Suite ==
In 1945 Strauss allowed an orchestral Rosenkavalier Suite to be published, but apparently was not involved in creating it. It is likely that conductor Artur Rodziński arranged it, as he conducted the suite's first performance, in October 1944 by the New York Philharmonic. Rodziński recorded the suite with the Philharmonic Symphony Orchestra of London on Westminster Hi-Fi, XWN 18680 in 1958.

The suite begins with the opera's orchestral prelude, depicting the Marschallin's and Octavian's night of passion (vividly portrayed by whooping horns). Next comes the appearance of Octavian as the "Rosenkavalier", depicted in tender music; the sight of him looking so young makes the Marschallin realise that he will soon leave her for a younger woman. There follows the duet between Octavian and Sophie (oboe and horn) – in which their love for each other becomes ever more obvious, but this is abruptly interrupted by the discordant music associated with Ochs's clumsy arrival. Next the violins tentatively introduce the first waltz, followed by another given out by the solo violin, before the whole orchestra settles into waltz mode. A general pause and a violin solo leads into the nostalgic music where the Marschallin sadly realises she has lost Octavian. Then comes its ecstatic climax. The work closes with a singularly robust waltz, depicting Ochs at his most pompous, and a boisterous coda newly composed for the suite. In addition to the musical structure of the suite, a detailed thematic guide identifying all the opera's leitmotifs can be found on the internet archive.

== Language ==
Hofmannsthal's libretto uses various forms of the German language. Members of the nobility speak in a refined and courteous mode, appropriate to the opera's 1740s setting. In more intimate circles they use a more familiar style of speech (du). For instance, the conversations between Octavian and the Marschallin in the first act use the familiar "you" but switch back and forth between more formal speech (Sie) and the familiar du, as well as the intermediate (and now obsolete) Er.

Some productions include a glossary in the programme to help clarify the contextual meaning of the language used, which is mostly lost in translation. Ochs makes clumsy, mannered attempts at refined or flamboyant language, using non-German words and phrases such as corpo di Bacco! ("by Bacchus's body!" in Italian), some of which he mispronounces. The language used by Octavian as Mariandl, and by other non-noble characters, is an Austrian dialect whose connotations are difficult for non-native speakers to grasp. The German used by the Italians, Valzacchi and Annina, is very broken and marked by Italian accentuations. Strauss and Hofmannsthal used dialects to depict the social status of a role in a similar way in their next opera, Ariadne auf Naxos.

In English translations, these dialects have been accounted for with varying degrees of rigor; the Chandos Highlights version, for example, uses only standard British English.

== Grainger's Ramble ==
Percy Grainger wrote an elaborate and complex piano transcription of a theme from Der Rosenkavalier. The Ramble on the Last Love Duet in Der Rosenkavalier is one of his more complex piano transcriptions, with many sumptuous ornamentations and harmonic twists and turns.
