= Semperoper =

Opera house and concert hall in Dresden, Germany

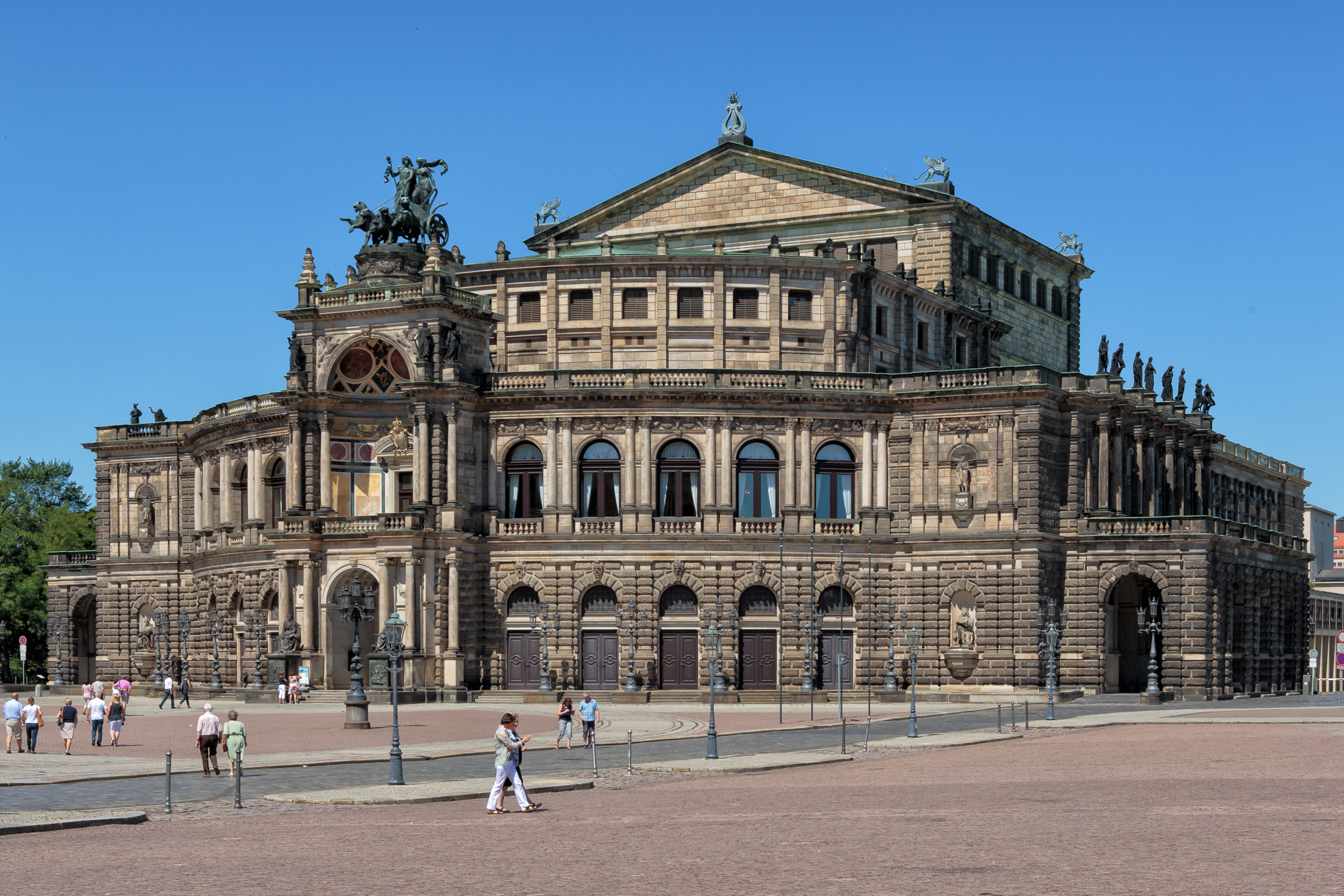
- The Semperoper in 2013
- Interactive map of Semperoper
- Location: Dresden, Germany
- Coordinates: 51°03′16″N 13°44′07″E
- Capacity: 1,300
- Type: Opera house, concert hall

Construction
- Built: 1841 (original); 1878 (first reconstruction); 1985 (second reconstruction)
- Architect: Gottfried Semper

Website
- https://www.semperoper.de/en/

The Semperoper (German pronunciation: [ˈzɛmpɐˌʔoːpɐ]) is the opera house of the Sächsische Staatsoper Dresden (Saxon State Opera) and the concert hall of the Staatskapelle Dresden (Saxon State Orchestra). It is also home to the Semperoper Ballett. The building is located on the Theaterplatz near the Elbe River in the historic centre of Dresden, Germany.

The opera house was originally built by the architect Gottfried Semper in 1841. After a devastating fire in 1869, the opera house was rebuilt, partly again by Semper, and completed in 1878. The opera house has a long history of premieres, including major works by Richard Wagner and Richard Strauss.

== History ==
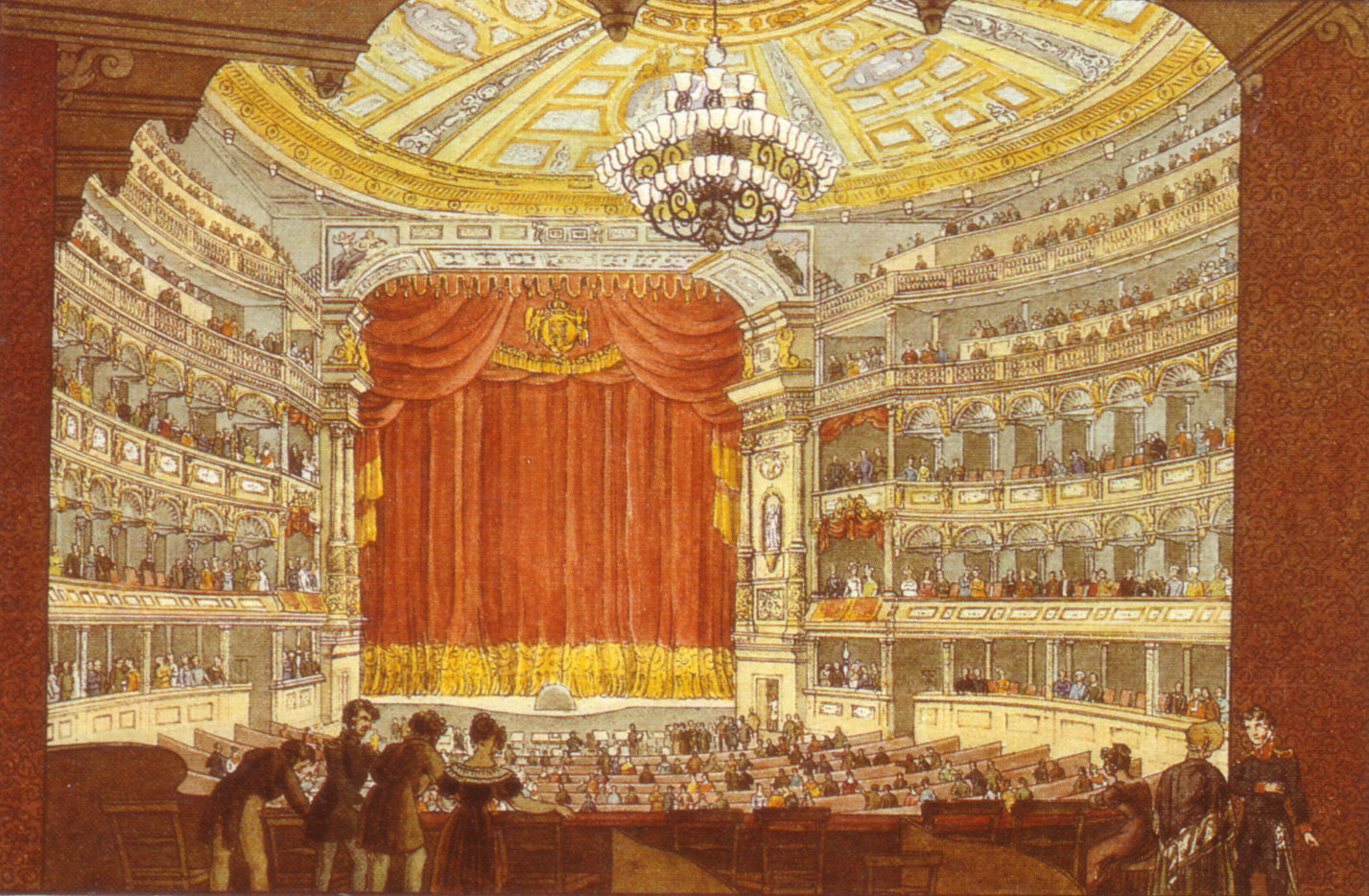
Interior of the first opera house in 1841

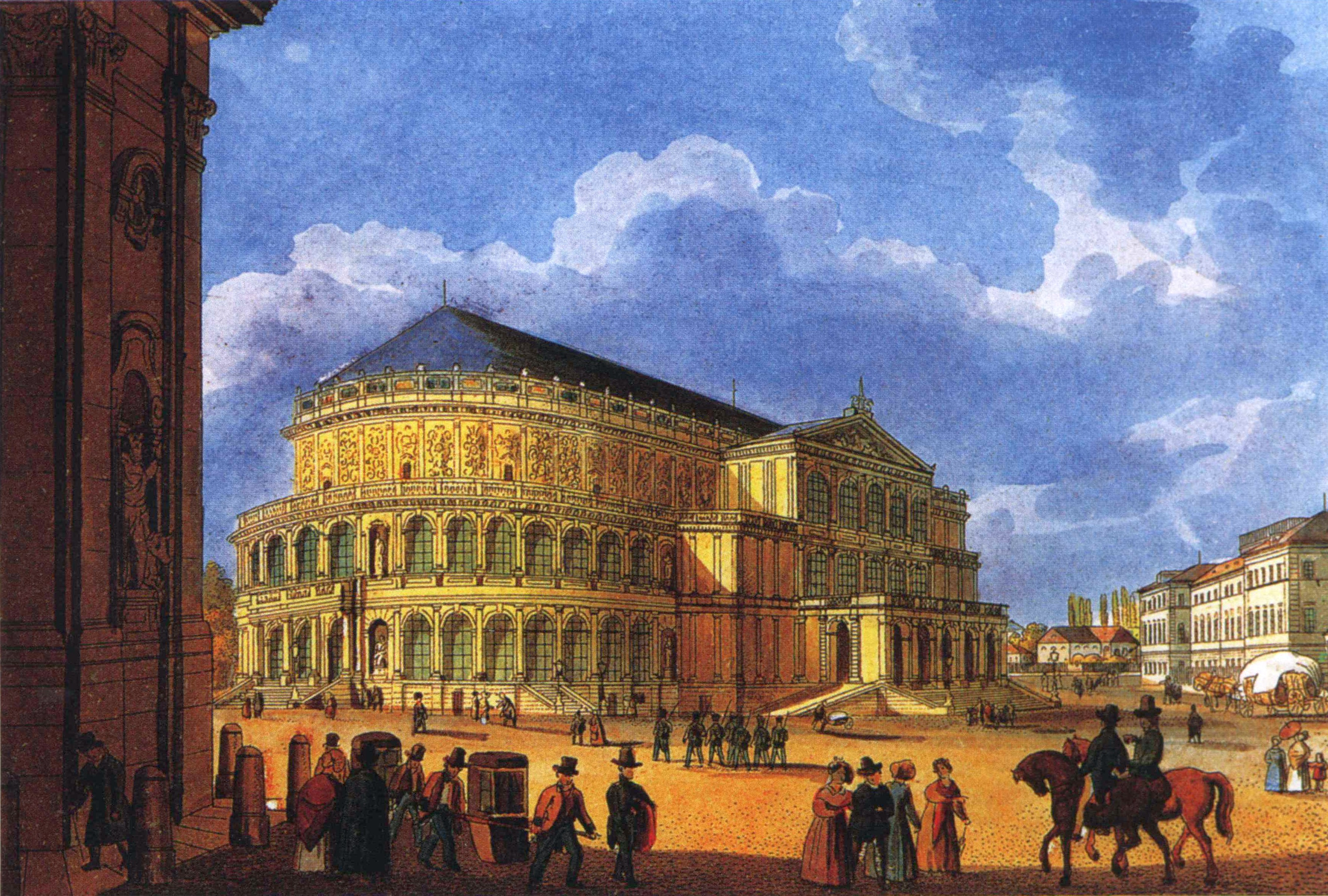
The first opera house, c. 1850

The first opera house at the location of today's Semperoper was built by the architect Gottfried Semper. It opened on 13 April 1841 with an opera by Carl Maria von Weber. The building style itself is debated among many, as it has features that appear in three styles: early Renaissance and Baroque, with Corinthian style pillars typical of Greek classical revival. Perhaps the most suitable label for this style would be eclecticism, where influences from many styles are used, a practice most common during this period. The opera building, Semper's first, was regarded as one of the most beautiful European opera houses.

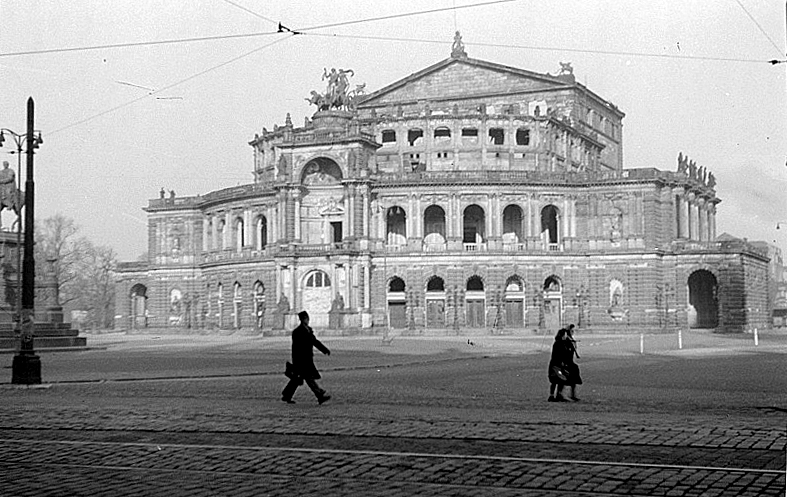
The Semperoper in July 1945

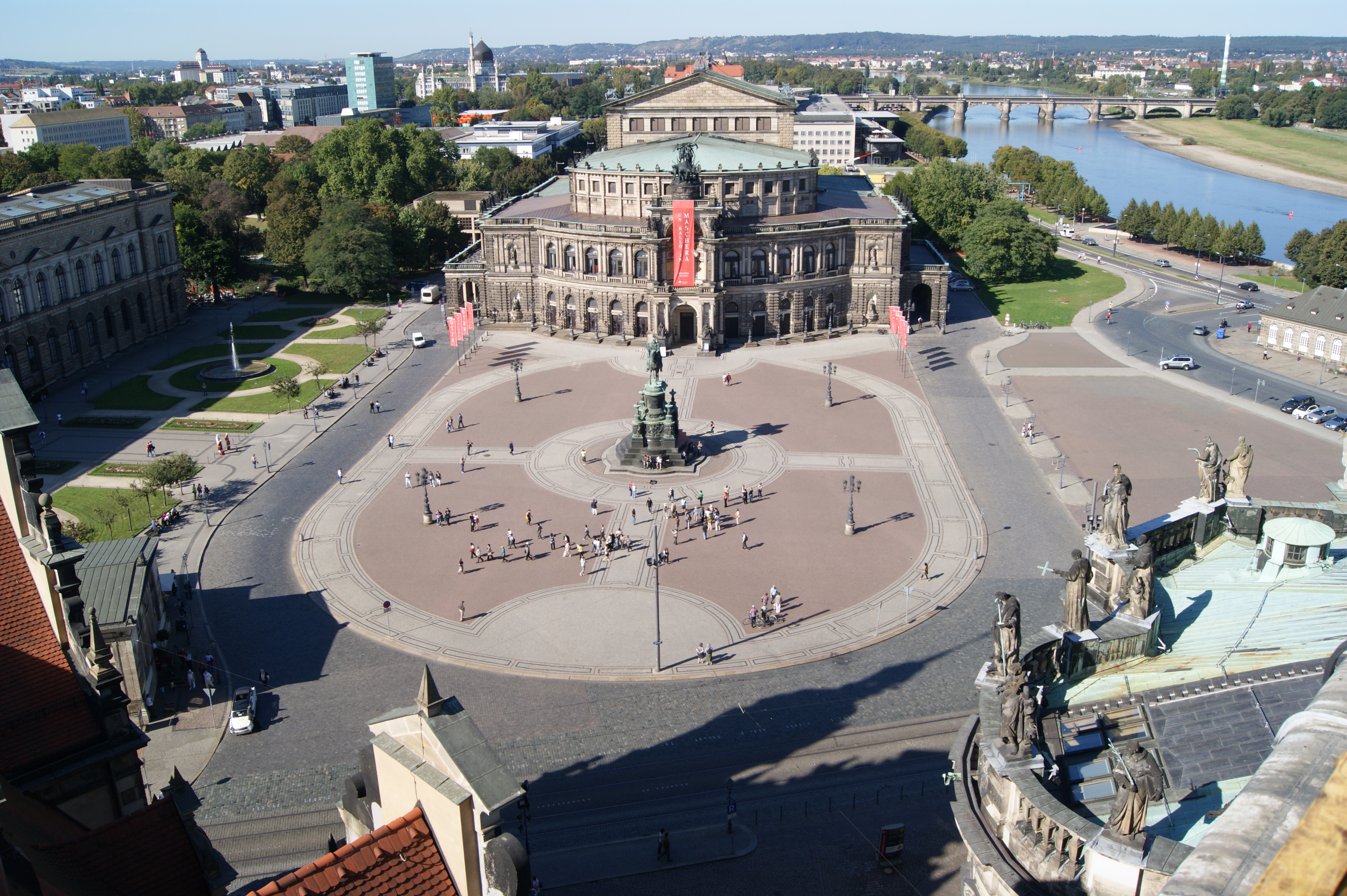
Semperoper with the Theatre Square, 2011

Following a devastating fire in 1869, the citizens of Dresden immediately set about rebuilding their opera house. They demanded that Gottfried Semper do the reconstruction, even though he was then in exile because of his involvement in the May 1849 uprising in Dresden. The architect had his son, Manfred Semper, build the second opera house using his plans. Completed in 1878, it was built in Neo-Renaissance style. During construction, performances were held at the Gewerbehaussaal, which opened in 1870.

The building is considered a prime example of Baroque Revival architecture. It is situated on the Theatre Square in central Dresden on the bank of the Elbe River. On top of the portal there is a Panther quadriga with a statue of Dionysos. The interior was created by architects of the time, such as Johannes Schilling. Monuments on the portal depict artists, such as Johann Wolfgang von Goethe, Friedrich Schiller, William Shakespeare, Sophocles, Molière and Euripides. The building also features work by Ernst Rietschel and Ernst Julius Hähnel. In the pre-war years, the Semperoper premiered many of the works of Richard Strauss.

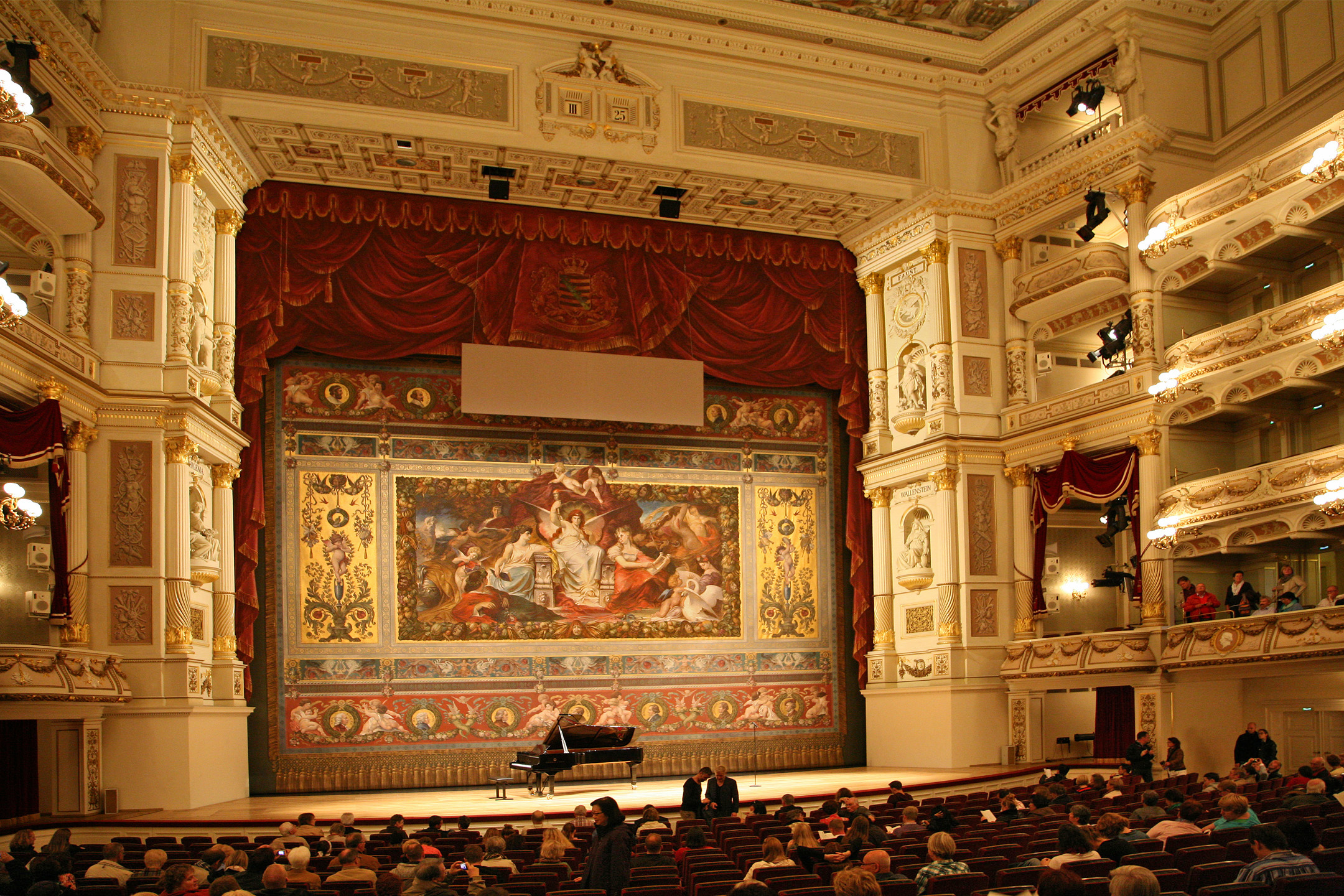
Interior of the current opera house, 2013

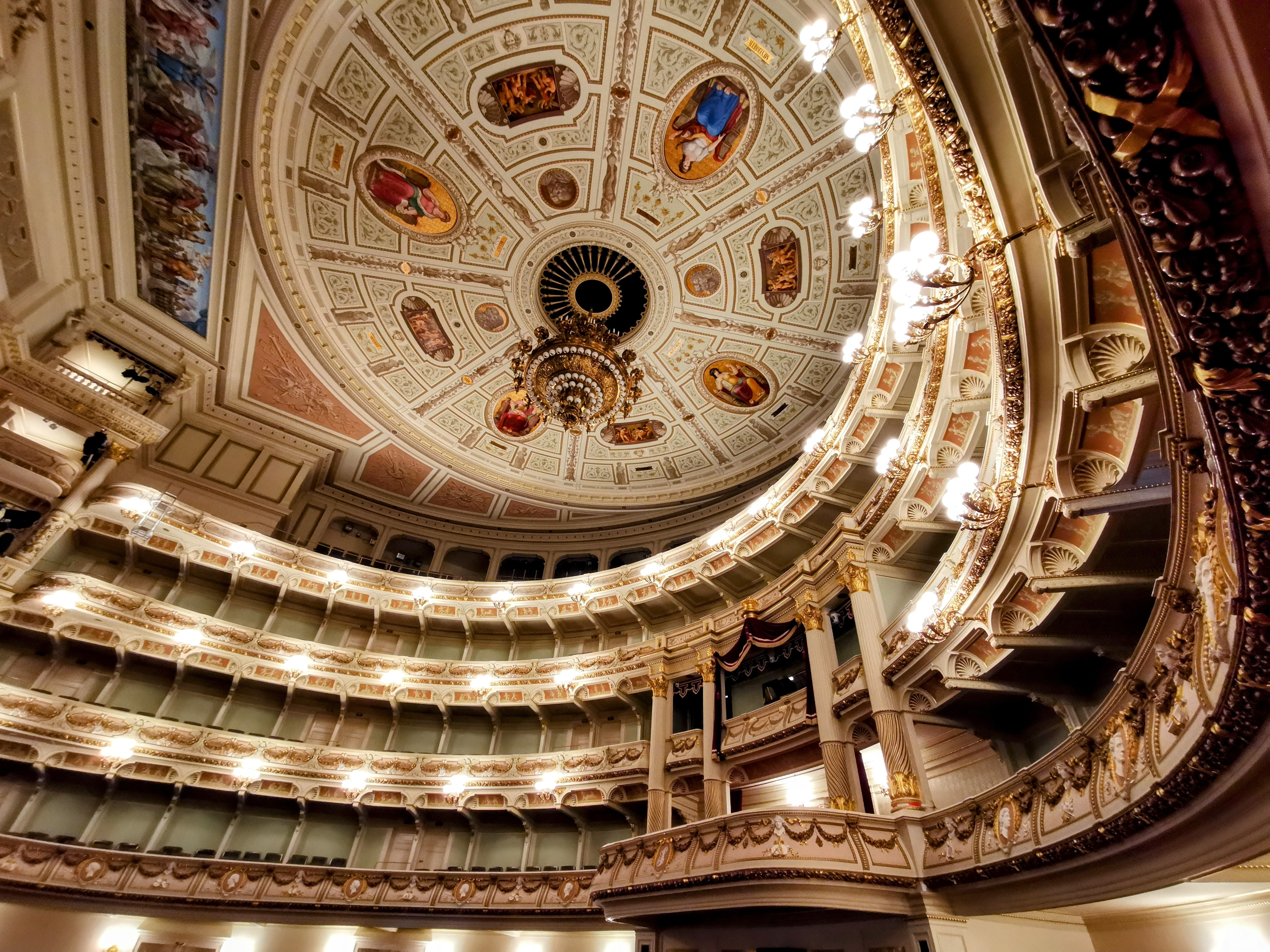
Interior of the current opera house, 2023

In 1945, during the last months of World War II, the building was largely destroyed again, this time by the bombing of Dresden and subsequent firestorm, leaving only the exterior shell standing. Exactly 40 years later, on 13 February 1985, the opera's reconstruction was completed. It was rebuilt almost identically to its appearance before the war, but with the benefit of new stage machinery and an accompanying modern rear service building. The Semperoper reopened with the opera that was performed just before the building's destruction in 1945, Carl Maria von Weber's Der Freischütz. When the Elbe flooded in 2002, the building suffered heavy water damage. With substantial help from around the world, it reopened in December of that year.

== Present-day administration and operations ==
Today, the orchestra for most operas is the Sächsische Staatskapelle Dresden. The Generalmusikdirektor (GMD) of the Semperoper is normally a different conductor from that of the Staatskapelle when it presents concerts. Exceptions have been Karl Böhm, Hans Vonk, and Fabio Luisi who have held both positions. Whilst the Semperoper does not have a GMD as of 2015, the chief conductor of the Staatskapelle Dresden was Christian Thielemann, as of the 2012/13 season. The current Intendant (General Manager) of the company is Wolfgang Rothe.

Since the 2018–2019 season, the Intendant of the Semperoper is Peter Theiler. In May 2021, his initial contract as Intendant was extended through the 2023–2024 season, at which time Theiler is scheduled to conclude his tenure in the post. In June 2021, the Semperoper announced the appointment of Nora Schmid as the incoming Intendantin of the company (the second woman to hold the post, after Ulrike Hessler), effective with the 2024–2025 season.

== Associated artists ==
=== Conductors ===
- Carl Gottlieb Reißiger
- Richard Wagner
- Ernst von Schuch (1889–1914)
- Fritz Reiner (1914–1921)
- Fritz Busch (1922–1933)
- Karl Böhm (1934–1942)
- Karl Elmendorff (1943–1944)
- Joseph Keilberth (1945–1951)
- Rudolf Kempe (1949–1952)
- Otmar Suitner (1960–1964)
- Kurt Sanderling (1964–1967)
- Herbert Blomstedt (1975–1985)
- Hans Vonk (1985–1990)
- Giuseppe Sinopoli (1992–2001)
- Semyon Bychkov (2001–2002)
- Bernard Haitink (2002–2004)
- Fabio Luisi (2007–2010)
- Christian Thielemann (2012–2024)

=== Singers ===
- Bernd Aldenhoff
- Helena Forti
- Elisabeth Höngen
- Friedrich Plaschke
- Elisabeth Rethberg
- Karl Scheidemantel
- Ernestine Schumann-Heink
- Erna Sack
- Richard Tauber
- Tino Pattiera
- Annie Krull
- Riza Eibenschütz
- Irma Tervani
- Meta Seinemeyer
- Margarethe Siems
- Therese Malten
- Edda Moser
- Minnie Nast
- Eva von der Osten
- Karl Perron
- Hermann Wedekind
- Marie Wittich

== Operas premiered ==
- 1842: Richard Wagner – Rienzi, 20 October
- 1843: Richard Wagner – The Flying Dutchman, 2 January
- 1845: Richard Wagner – Tannhäuser, 19 October
- 1895: Eugen d'Albert: Ghismonda, 28 November
- 1901: Richard Strauss – Feuersnot, 22 November
- 1905: Richard Strauss – Salome, 9 December
- 1909: Richard Strauss – Elektra, 25 January
- 1911: Richard Strauss – Der Rosenkavalier, 26 January
- 1913: Ermanno Wolf-Ferrari – L'amore medico, 4 December
- 1916: Eugen d'Albert – Die toten Augen, 5 March
- 1917: Hans Pfitzner – Das Christ-Elflein (2nd version), 11 December
- 1924: Richard Strauss – Intermezzo, 4 November
- 1925: Ferruccio Busoni – Doktor Faust, 21 May
- 1926: Kurt Weill – Der Protagonist, 27 March
- 1926: Paul Hindemith – Cardillac, 9 November
- 1927: Emil von Reznicek – Spiel oder Ernst
- 1927: Othmar Schoeck – Penthesilea, 8 January
- 1928: Richard Strauss – Die ägyptische Helena, 6 June
- 1930: Othmar Schoeck – Vom Fischer and syner Fru, 3 October
- 1932: Eugen d'Albert – Mr Wu
- 1933: Richard Strauss – Arabella, 1 July
- 1935: Richard Strauss – Die schweigsame Frau, 24 June
- 1935: Rudolf Wagner-Régeny – Der Günstling, 20 February
- 1937: Othmar Schoeck – Massimilla Doni, 2 March
- 1938: Richard Strauss – Daphne, 15 October
- 1940: Heinrich Sutermeister – Romeo und Julia, 13 April
- 1942: Heinrich Sutermeister – Die Zauberinsel, 31 October
- 1944: Gottfried von Einem – Prinzessin Turandot, 5 February
- 1944: Joseph Haas – Die Hochzeit des Jobs, 2 July
- 1985: Siegfried Matthus – Die Weise von Liebe und Tod des Cornets Christoph Rilke, 16 February
- 1989: Eckehard Meyer – Der goldene Topf, 1989
- 1998: Matthias Pintscher – Thomas Chatterton, 25 May
- 2001: Peter Ruzicka – Celan, 25 March
- 2008: Manfred Trojahn – La grande magia, 10 May
- 2010: Hans Werner Henze – Gisela (Dresden version), 20 November
- 2011: Miroslav Srnka – Jakub Flügelbunt , 15 December
- 2012: Johannes Wulff-Woesten – Die Konferenz der Tiere, 8 July
- 2013: Johannes Wulff-Woesten – Prinz Bussel, 27 April
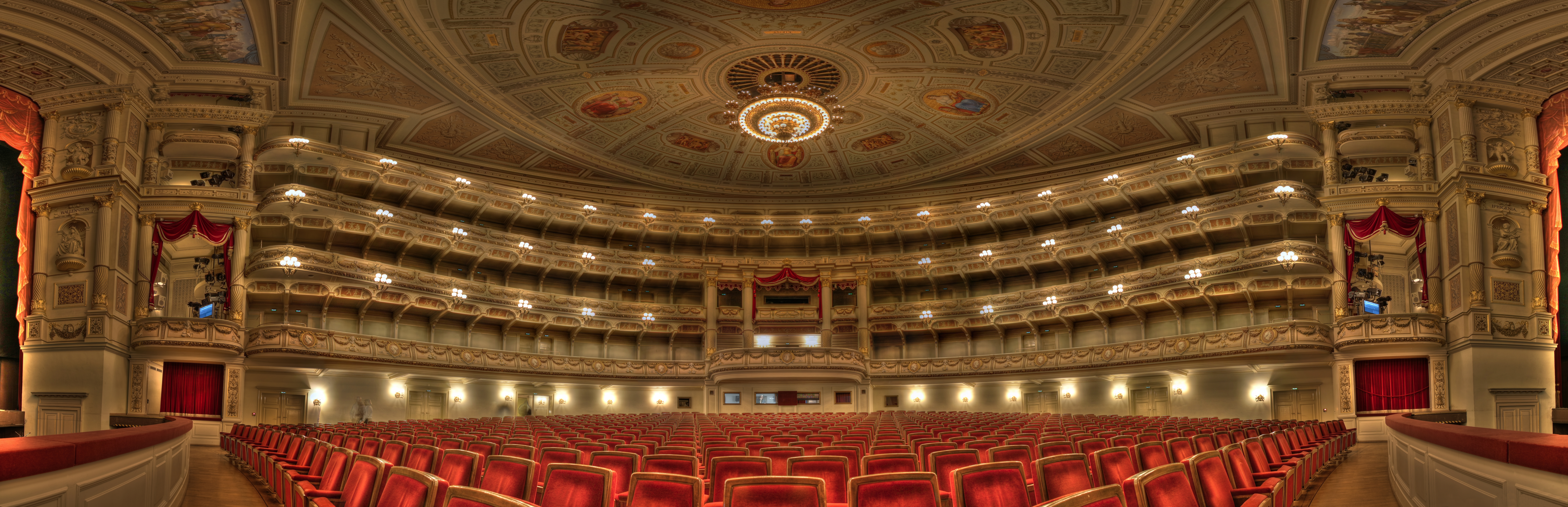
Panoramic view of the theatre's interior today (rendered image)

== See also ==
- Opernhaus am Taschenberg
