= Gertrud Kappel =

German opera singer

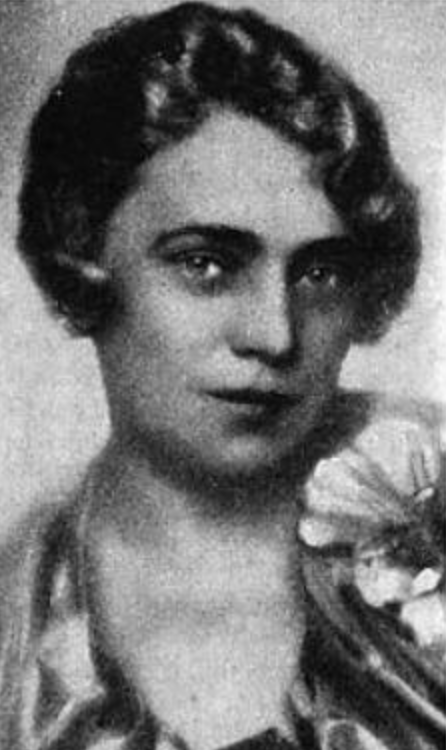
- Gertrud Kappel, from a 1928 publication
- Born: September 1, 1885; Halle, Germany
- Died: April 3, 1971 (aged 85); Münich
- Other names: Gertrude Kappel Vukas
- Occupation: Opera singer

Gertrud Kappel Vukas (sometimes Gertrude; September 1, 1885 – April 3, 1971) was a German dramatic soprano. She sang at the Metropolitan Opera and at the Royal Opera House during her career, and was known for her Wagnerian and Strauss roles.

== Early life and education ==
Born in Halle, Kappel studied under Hungarian conductor Artur Nikisch at the conservatory in Leipzig, before making her debut in Il trovatore in Hanover in 1907.

== Career ==
Kappel was active in many major opera houses during her career. She sang in Munich and Vienna, in London in 1912–1913 and 1924–1925, at the Metropolitan Opera from 1927 until 1936. She also toured as a concert singer, and made recordings.

Kappel was known for her interpretations of the works of Richard Wagner and Richard Strauss, especially Isolde, Brunnhilde, and Kundry. In London, she gave "a fine Brunnhilde" in 1924, and was "a rare pleasure" as Isolde in 1925. Her performances as Elektra, Sieglinde, and Senta in London in 1925 were described as having "dramatic force" and "uncanny eloquence". In her first Chicago appearance in 1928, "her account of the Brünnhilde music carried a genuine thrill." In 1932 she starred in the first production of Elektra at the Metropolitan Opera. In January 1934, she and Lauritz Melchior co-starred in a national radio broadcast of Tristan and Isolde. The following month, she was again heard on radio, in a national broadcast of Die Walkure with Paul Althouse and Frida Leider.

== Personal life ==
Kappel was married to engineer Simon Vukas. She died in 1971, at the age of 86, in Munich.
