= Sigrid Onégin =

Franco-German operatic contralto

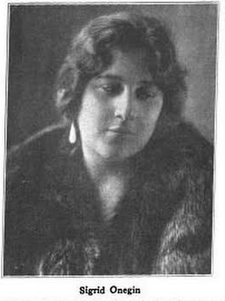
- Sigrid Onégin, from a 1922 publication.
- Born: June 1, 1889; Stockholm, Sweden
- Died: June 13, 1943 (aged 54); Magliaso, Switzerland
- Occupation: Opera singer (dramatic contralto)

Sigrid Onégin (June 1, 1889 – June 16, 1943) was a Franco-German operatic dramatic contralto who enjoyed a major international career prior to World War II. She was celebrated for the richness of its tone, its flexibility, its size, and its expert coloratura technique. She also possessed a wide vocal range.

== Biography ==
She was born in Stockholm, Sweden, in 1889 to a German father and a French mother. She first sang professionally under her maiden name, Lilly Hoffmann. She made her first public appearance in Wiesbaden, September 16, 1911, in a recital. She was accompanied on that occasion by a Russian pianist and composer, Baron Eugene Borisovitch Lvov Onégin (b. St. Petersburg, October 10, 1883; d. Stuttgart, November 12, 1919), a Russian émigré, pianist and composer. He had adopted the surname of Alexander Pushkin's celebrated hero, Eugene Onegin; he claimed his real name was 'Lvov', and he was a grandnephew of Alexis Lvov, composer of the Russian Tsarist hymn, but in fact he was no man altogether but pianist and composer Agnes Overbeck. Hoffmann and Onégin married in London on May 25, 1912, after which she sang briefly as Lilly Hoffmann-Onégin before settling on Sigrid Onégin, the name by which she became famous.

She studied in Frankfurt, Munich, and Milan, and also took lessons from famous singers of an earlier generation in Lilli Lehmann and Margarethe Siems. Her operatic debut occurred at Stuttgart in October 1912, where she appeared as Carmen. She joined the Stuttgart Opera in 1912 and the Munich Opera in 1919. After her first husband's death in 1919, she married a second time in 1920 to Dr. Fritz Penzoldt, who would later write her biography.

In the 1920s, she spent two seasons at the Metropolitan Opera and one at Covent Garden, singing Amneris (Aida) as well as a variety of Wagnerian roles. In the 1930s, she sang at Salzburg and Bayreuth Festival, but she was most widely sought after for her concert performances.

Her last concert appearance came in the United States in 1938. She died at Magliaso, in neutral Switzerland in 1943, while the Second World War was raging at its height. She made a number of 78-rpm recordings during the years of her prime which have been re-issued on CD.

== Operatic creations ==
- Onegin created the role of Dryad in Ariadne auf Naxos

== Notable roles ==
- Orfeo (Gluck's Orfeo ed Euridice)
- Eboli (Don Carlos)
- Fidès (Le prophète)
- Erda (Das Rheingold and Siegfried)
- Lady Macbeth (Macbeth)
- Fricka (Das Rheingold and Die Walküre)
- Waltraute (Die Walküre and Götterdämmerung)
- Brangäne (Tristan und Isolde)
- Amneris (Aida)
- Orsini (Lucrezia Borgia)
