= Margarethe Siems =

German opera singer

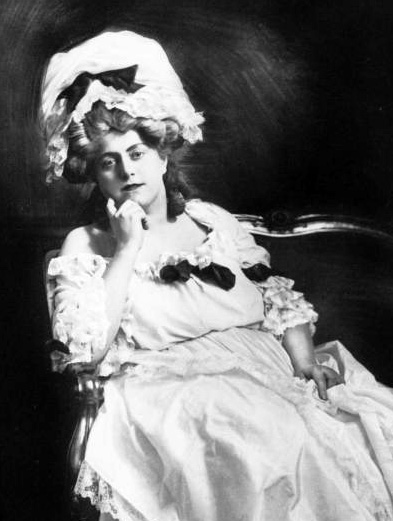
- Margarethe Siems as the Marschallin in Der Rosenkavalier, 1911

Background information
- Born: 20 December 1879; Breslau, German Empire
- Died: 13 April 1952 (aged 72) Dresden, East Germany
- Genres: Opera
- Occupations: dramatic coloratura soprano, voice teacher
- Formerly of: Dresden State Opera (1908–1922)

Margarethe Siems (20 December 1879 – 13 April 1952) was a German operatic dramatic coloratura soprano and voice teacher. A Kammersängerin of the Dresden State Opera, between 1909 and 1912 Siems created leading roles in three operas by Richard Strauss: Chrysothemis in Elektra, the Marschallin in Der Rosenkavalier, and Zerbinetta in Ariadne auf Naxos.

== Biography ==
Margarethe Siems was born in Breslau (now Wrocław). After early training in piano and violin, she studied singing at the Dresden Conservatory with the Hungarian soprano, Aglaja Orgeni, who had herself been a pupil of Pauline Viardot and Mathilde Marchesi. She made her opera début at the Neues deutsches Theatre, Prague in 1902 as Marguerite de Valois in Meyerbeer's Les Huguenots and became a member of the Dresden State Opera in 1908. At Dresden she sang in the premieres for both Elektra as Chrysothemis (1909) and Der Rosenkavalier as the Marschallin (1911). Strauss considered her his ideal for the latter role which she also sang in the London premiere of Der Rosenkavalier (Covent Garden, 1913). Her third Strauss premiere was as Zerbinetta in the first version of his Ariadne auf Naxos (Stuttgart, 1912).

Siems' singing style (like that of her contemporaries Hermine Bosetti and Marie Gutheil-Schoder) was described by Michael Scott as "instrumental" rather than warmly emotional. However, she had a wide repertoire which included florid coloratura soprano roles such as the Queen of the Night in The Magic Flute and Lucia in Lucia di Lammermoor; the dramatic soprano Verdi heroines such as the title role in Aida and Amelia in Ballo in maschera; and even the Wagnerian roles of Sieglinde in Die Walküre and Isolde in Tristan und Isolde. Her vocal range was as wide as her repertoire, with the ability to sing both Zerbinetta with its high F♯ (in the original version) and low-lying roles, usually sung by mezzo-sopranos such as the title role in Carmen and Adalgisa in Bellini's Norma.

Although Siems remained a member of the Dresden State Opera until 1922, she was also a singing teacher at the Berlin conservatory from 1920 to 1926. She then taught in Dresden and Breslau until 1940. One of her early pupils was the German contralto, Sigrid Onegin. She made her final stage performance in 1925 as the Marschallin in Der Rosenkavalier in Breslau, but continued to sing in concerts, often with the German singer and composer, Georg Hartmann, a fellow resident of Bad Landeck, where she spent her retirement years. Towards the end of her life, Margarethe Siems moved back to Dresden where she died on 13 April 1952 at the age of 72.

== Recordings ==
Margarethe Siems – Königliche Sächsische Hofopernsängerin is a remastered selection of Siems' early recordings for G & T, Pathé, His Master's Voice and Parlophone, representing roles in a wide range of operas, including Aida, Der Rosenkavalier, Les Huguenots, Lucia di Lammermoor, La traviata, Dinorah, Lakmé, and Le nozze di Figaro. Label: Symposium SYM 1227.

== Sources ==
- Midgette, Anne, "A 'Baroque' Approach to Strauss Opera", The New York Times, 17 February 2002
- Rosenthal, H. and Warrack, J., "Siems, Margarethe", The Concise Oxford Dictionary of Opera, 2nd Edition, Oxford University Press, 1979, p. 461. ISBN 0-19-311321-X
- Scott, Michael, The Record of Singing, Vol. I, Northeastern University Press, 1993, p. 168. ISBN 1-55553-163-6
