= Annie Krull =

German operatic soprano

Annie Krull as Elektra, photographed in 1909

Anna Maria Krull (12 January 1876 – 14 June 1947) was a German operatic soprano. She is most remembered today for having created the title role in Richard Strauss' opera Elektra.

== Biography ==
Annie Krull was born in Rostock, studied in Berlin with Hertha Brämer, and made her stage debut in 1898 at the Plauen Stadttheater as Agathe in Der Freischütz. From 1900 to 1912, she sang at the Dresden State Opera, where in 1901 she created the title role in Paderewski's Manru and Diemut in Richard Strauss' early opera Feuersnot. Strauss, who had admired her dramatic qualities, then chose her to be the first Elektra. A year after its premiere in Dresden on 25 January 1909, she repeated the role at London's Royal Opera House. It was the first time a Strauss opera was performed in Britain.

Krull sang regularly in several other German opera houses (Mannheim, Weimar, Leipzig, Cologne, Karlsruhe and Schwerin) as well as appearing in Brno (1905) and Prague (1907). Amongst the other roles she sang were Leonore in Fidelio, Senta in The Flying Dutchman, Elsa in Lohengrin, Elisabeth in Tannhäuser, Sieglinde in Die Walküre, Isolde in Tristan und Isolde, Margiana in Der Barbier von Bagdad, Marta in Tiefland, and Valentine in Les Huguenots.

Annie Krull had married the bass Max Flor in 1904, and in her later years lived in Schwerin where she taught singing. She died there on 14 June 1947 at the age of 71.

== Recordings ==
Krull's voice can be heard on a complete recording of Act 2 of Tannhäuser made in Berlin in 1909 for Odeon, further records were made for Pathé (Berlin 1913). A remastered version appears on Wagner: Tannhäuser Act II; Lohengrin Bridal Scene (Preiser Records 89949)

== Sources ==
- Kutsch, K.J. and Riemens, Leo, Unvergangliche Stimmen, Francke Verlag Bern, 1962, p. 277.
- Rosenthal, H. and Warrack, J., The Concise Oxford Dictionary of Opera, 2nd Edition, Oxford University Press, 1979, p. 267
- Girard & Barnes: Vertical-cut Cylinders and Discs, BIRS London 1971
