= Karl Perron =

German opera singer

Karl Perron as Jochanaan in Salome Dresden, 1907

Karl Perron, born Karl Pergamenter and also known as Carl Perron, (3 June 1858 – 15 July 1928) was a German bass-baritone. A Kammersänger of the Dresden State Opera, he created leading roles in three operas by Richard Strauss – Jochanaan in Salome, Orest in Elektra, and Baron Ochs in Der Rosenkavalier.

== Biography ==
Karl Perron was born in Frankenthal to one of the city's prominent families. His father was an art collector and numismatist. Another of his relatives, Phillip Perron (1840–1907), was the court sculptor to Ludwig II of Bavaria. After studies with Julius Hey in Berlin, Joseph Hasselbeck in Munich, and Julius Stockhausen in Frankfurt, Perron made his debut in Leipzig in 1884 as Wolfram in Tannhäuser. He sang in Leipzig until 1891 when he became a member of the Dresden State Opera. Perron remained with the Dresden company until his retirement in 1924, and sang there in three world premieres of operas by Richard Strauss – Jochanaan (John the Baptist) in Salome (1905), Orest (Orestes) in Elektra (1909), and Baron Ochs in Der Rosenkavalier (1911).

Perron was a distinguished Wagnerian singer and appeared at Bayreuth from 1889 to 1904 where his roles included Wotan, Amfortas, and King Marke. Charles Webber, who had been a voice coach at the Dresden State Opera from 1908 to 1911 recalled that Perron was past the peak of his career by then but still an impressive singer, especially in the title role of The Flying Dutchman and as Wotan. According to Webber, although Perron's top notes were occasionally forced and his intonation sometimes faulty, he retained an intense and mesmerizing stage presence which obscured the flaws. Outside the Wagner and Strauss repertoire, Perron's other notable roles were Don Giovanni and Eugene Onegin.

Perron taught singing after his retirement. His house in Dresden was filled with his own art collection, and the salons there were one of the centers of the city's musical life. He never married and lived with his sister, Käthe, who ran his household. Karl Perron died in Dresden on 15 July 1928 at the age of 70.
