= Elektra (opera) =

1909 opera by Richard Strauss

- Opera by Richard Strauss
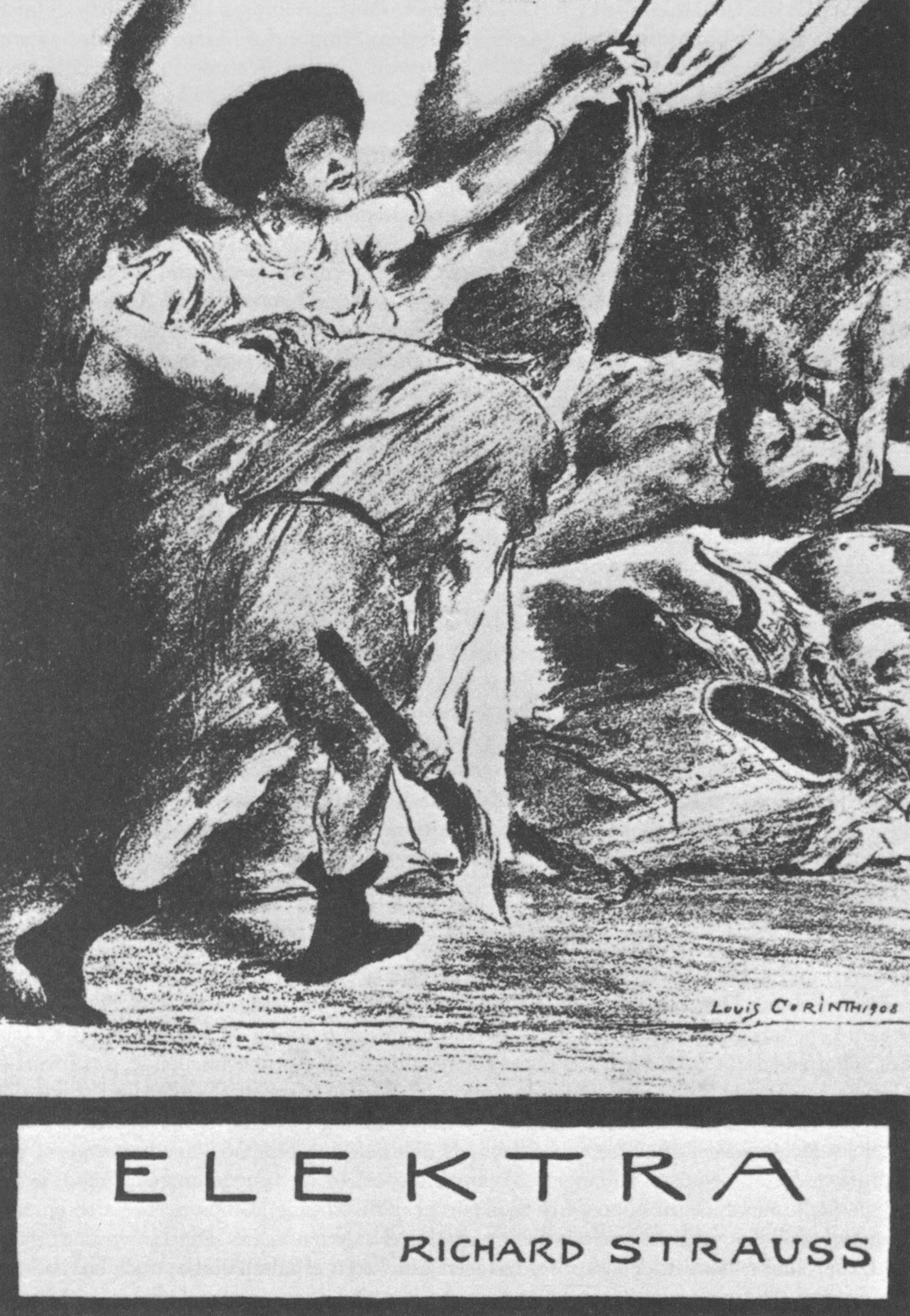
- Cover of the libretto, drawing by Lovis Corinth, 1909
- Librettist: Hugo von Hofmannsthal
- Language: German
- Based on: Sophocles' Electra
- Premiere: 25 January 1909; Königliches Opernhaus, Dresden

Elektra, Op. 58, is a one-act opera by Richard Strauss, to a German-language libretto by Hugo von Hofmannsthal, which he adapted from his 1903 drama Elektra. The opera was the first of many collaborations between Strauss and Hofmannsthal. It was finished in 1908, and first performed at the Königliches Opernhaus in Dresden on 25 January 1909 with Annie Krull in the leading role. It was dedicated to his friends Natalie and Willy Levin.

== History ==
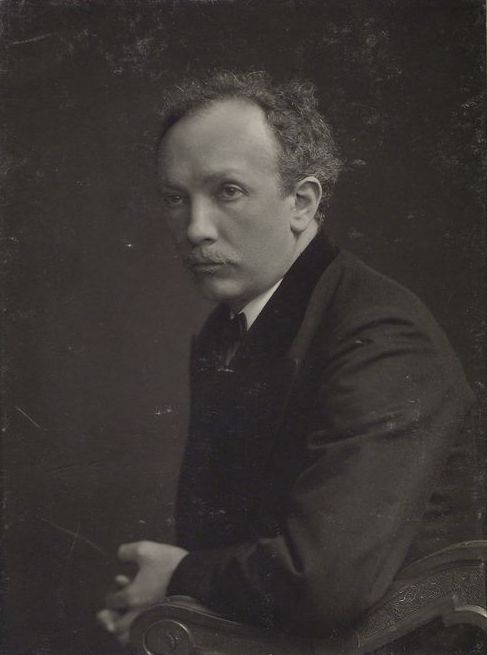
The composer in 1911

While based on ancient Greek mythology and Sophocles' tragedy Electra, the opera is highly modernist and expressionist in style. Hofmannsthal's and Strauss's adaptation of the story focuses tightly on Elektra, thoroughly developing her character by single-mindedly expressing her emotions and psychology as she meets with other characters, mostly one at a time. (The order of these conversations closely follows Sophocles' play.) The other characters are Klytaemnestra, her mother and one of the murderers of her father Agamemnon; her sister, Chrysothemis; her brother, Orest; and Klytaemnestra's lover, Aegisth.

Various aspects from the myth are minimized as background to Elektra's character and her obsession. Other facets of the ancient story are completely excluded, in particular the earlier sacrifice by Agamemnon of his and Klytaemnestra's daughter Iphigenia, which was the motivation for Klytaemnestra's subsequent murder of Agamemnon. These changes tightened the focus on Elektra's furious lust for revenge. The result is a very modern, expressionistic retelling of the ancient Greek myth. Compared to Sophocles's Electra, the opera presents raw, brutal, violent, and bloodthirsty horror. Some scholars detect hints of incest in Elektra's dysfunctional family relationships. Norwegian musicologist Ståle Wikshåland has analysed the use of time and temporality in the dramaturgy of Elektra.

Elektra is the second of Strauss's two highly modernist operas (the other being Salome), characterized by cacophonous sections and atonal leitmotifs. These works contrast highly with his earliest operas and his later period. The reception of Elektra in German-speaking countries was mostly divided along traditionalist and modernist lines.

== Performance history ==
Elektra is one of the most frequently performed operas based on classical Greek mythology, with a performance lasting—like the composer's earlier Salome—around 100 minutes. Elektra received its UK premiere at the Royal Opera House, Covent Garden, in 1910 with Edyth Walker in the title role and Thomas Beecham conducting at the first- ever performance of a Strauss opera in the UK. The first United States performance of the opera in the original German was given by the Philadelphia Grand Opera Company at the Academy of Music on 29 October 1931, with Anne Roselle in the title role, Charlotte Boerner as Chrysothemis, Margarete Matzenauer as Klytaemnestra, Nelson Eddy as Orest, and Fritz Reiner conducting. The opera made its premiere at the Metropolitan Opera in New York on 3 December 1932, with Gertrude Kappel singing the title role and Artur Bodanzky conducting.

== Roles ==
Annie Krull as Elektra, c. 1909

Roles, voice types, premiere cast
Roles	Voice type	Premiere, 25 January 1909 Conductor: Ernst von Schuch
Elektra (Electra), Agamemnon's daughter	high dramatic soprano	Annie Krull
Chrysothemis, her sister	soprano	Margarethe Siems
Klytaemnestra (Clytemnestra), their mother, Agamemnon's widow and killer	contralto or mezzo-soprano	Ernestine Schumann-Heink
Her confidante	soprano	Gertrud Sachse
Her trainbearer	soprano	Elisabeth Boehm von Endert
A young servant	tenor	Fritz Soot
An old servant	bass	Franz Nebuschka
Orest (Orestes), son of Agamemnon	baritone	Karl Perron
Orest's tutor	bass	Julius Puttlitz
Aegisth (Aegisthus), Klytaemnestra's paramour	tenor	Johannes Sembach
An overseer	soprano	Riza Eibenschütz
First maid	contralto	Franziska Bender-Schäfer
Second maid	soprano	Magdalene Seebe
Third maid	mezzo-soprano	Irma Tervani
Fourth maid	soprano	Anna Zoder
Fifth maid	soprano	Minnie Nast
Men and women of the household

== Synopsis ==
Before the opera begins, Agamemnon sacrifices Iphigenia by deceit and leaves for the Trojan War. Upon his return, he is murdered by Klytaemnestra and her lover Aegisthus, who was a cousin to Agamemnon prompting fears of revenge from their children, Elektra, Chrysothemis, and the exiled Orest. Elektra remains at court to honor her father’s memory, while enduring hostility from her mother and the household.

=== Plot ===
==== "Wo bleibt Elektra?" ("Where is Elektra?") ====
Five servants try to wash the courtyard of the palace in Mycenae. While they do their work, they ask where can Elektra be, and she emerges from the shadows with a wild look on her face. The servants continue commenting how she came to be in that state and talk about how they taunt her only to receive insults from her. Only one servant shows sympathy for her, but she is taken away by the overseer to be flogged.

==== "Allein! Weh, ganz allein." ("Alone! Alas, all alone.") ====
Elektra comes back for her daily ritual in memory of her father, who upon his return from Troy was killed while bathing by Klytaemnestra and Aegisth and dragged out into the courtyard. Elektra now starts imagining the day when her father will be avenged and then of the ensuing celebration in which she will lead the triumphal dance.

==== "Elektra!" ====
Chrysothemis enters the courtyard. Unlike Elektra, she is meek and accommodating, and has remained on decent terms with Klytaemnestra and Aegisth. However, she cares for the welfare of her sister. She tells Elektra that their mother plans to lock Elektra in a tower, where no daylight will enter. Elektra laughs at this plan. Elektra asks where Chrysothemis heard it. When she tells her that she heard it at the Queen's door, Elektra screams that there is nothing to find in this house but death. She might as well sit and wish death on her mother and stepfather, as Elektra does.

==== "Ich kann nicht sitzen und ins Dunkel starren." ("I can not sit and stare into the darkness.") ====
Chrysothemis does not wish to go on living a half-death in her own house: she wants to leave, marry and raise children.

==== "Es geht ein Lärm los." ("What tumult is this?") ====
As loud sounds are heard inside, Elektra mocks her sister that it is her wedding party. In reality, it is Klytaemnestra, who has just been awakened by her own nightmares. She goes with a large processional on her way to appease the gods through sacrifice. Chrysothemis tells Elektra that Klytaemnestra dreams of Orest murdering her. Chrysothemis begs Elektra not to stir trouble with Klytaemnestra today. She tells her that when their mother is scared, she is the most vicious. Elektra shuns her sister's pleas, telling her that she will speak to her mother as never before. Chrysothemis flees the courtyard.

==== "Was willst du? Seht doch, dort!" ("What do you want? Behold, there!") ====
Klytaemnestra stops at the sight of Elektra and wishes that she were not there to disturb her. She asks the gods for the reason for her burdens, but Elektra appeases her by telling her mother that she is a goddess herself.

==== "Ich will nichts hören!" ("I don't want to hear anything.") ====
Despite the protests of the Trainbearer and Confidante, Klytaemnestra climbs down to talk to Elektra. She passionately remembers her years of motherhood with her daughter. She accuses her retinue of being contradictory in their justifications of her nightmares, so she relies on her daughter for a true interpretation.

==== "Ich habe keine guten Nächte." ("I have no good nights.") ====
Klytaemnestra confides to her daughter that she has been suffering nightmares every night and that she still has not found the way to appease the gods. But, she claims, once that happens, she will be able to sleep again.

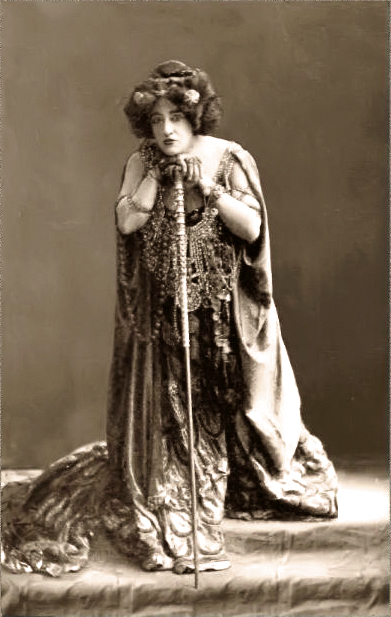
Anna von Mildenburg as Klytaemnestra in the Vienna Court Opera's 1909 production

==== "Wenn das rechte Blutopfer unterm Beile fällt." ("When the right blood under the hatchet flows.") ====
Elektra teases her mother with little pieces of information about the right victim that must be slain, but she changes the conversation to her brother and why he is not allowed back. To Elektra's horror, Klytaemnestra says that he has become mad and keeps company with animals. She responds that this is not true and that all the gold that her mother has sent was not being used to support her son but to have him killed. Angered by this, Klytaemnestra goes off on an insane tirade, telling Elektra that she would give the proper information for a rite and sacrificial victim if she were starved.

==== "Was bluten muß? Dein eigenes Genick." ("Who must bleed? Your own throat.") ====
Then Elektra reveals who is to be the actual victim: it is Klytaemnestra herself. She goes on to describe how the gods must be appeased once and for all. She must be awakened and chased around the house just like an animal that is being hunted. Only when she wishes that all was over and after envying prisoners in their cells, she will come to realize that her prison is her own body. At that time, the axe, with which she killed her husband and which will be handed to Orest by Elektra, will fall upon her. Only then the dreams will stop.

==== "Lichter! Mehr Lichter" ("Lights! More lights!") ====
The Trainbearer and Confidante enter and whisper to her. Klytaemnestra laughs hysterically and, mocking Elektra, leaves. Elektra wonders what has made her mother laugh.

==== "Orest! Orest ist tot!" ("Orest! Orest is dead!") ====
Chrysothemis comes bolting into the courtyard. She says that two messengers have arrived with the news that Orest is dead, trampled by his own horses. Elektra screams that it is not true. Both sisters sink to the ground in misery.

==== "Platz da! Wer lungert so vor einer Tür?" ("Give way! Who spies thus upon the threshold?") ====
As a young servant comes out of the house to fetch the master, he trips over Elektra and Chrysothemis.

==== "Nun muß es hier von uns geschehn." ("It is for us to act now.") ====
Elektra does not relent and a terrified Chrysothemis listens as her sister demands that she help her to avenge their father.

==== "Wie stark du bist." ("How strong you are.") ====
Elektra goes on to praise her sister and her beauty, promising that she shall become Chrysothemis's slave at her bridal chamber in exchange for the assistance in her task. Chrysothemis fights off her sister and flees. Elektra curses her.

==== "Nun denn, allein!" ("Well, alone!") ====
Determined to do it alone, she digs for the axe that killed her father, but is interrupted by a mysterious man who comes into the courtyard.

==== "Was willst du, fremder Mensch?" ("What do you want, stranger?") ====
She hears that he is expecting to be called from within the palace because he has a message for the lady of the house. He claims to be a friend of Orest, and says that he was with him at the time of his death.

==== "Wer bist denn du?" ("Who are you?") ====
Elektra grieves. The man first guesses that she must be a blood relative of Orest and Agamemnon, then, upon asking her name, discovers she is Elektra.

==== "Orest!" ====
Then, taken aback, she recognizes him: it is Orest who has come back in disguise. Elektra is initially ecstatic, but also ashamed of what she has become and how she has sacrificed her own royal state for the cause.

==== "Du wirst es tun? Allein? Du armes Kind?" ("You'll do it? Alone? Poor child?") ====
Orest's Tutor comes and interrupts the siblings; their task is dangerous and anything can jeopardize it. The Trainbearer and Confidante come out of the palace and lead Orest in.

==== "Ich habe ihm das Beil nicht geben können!" ("I could not give him the axe!") ====
Elektra realizes that she forgot to give the axe to Orest. Horrified, she has no other choice but to wait. Nevertheless, the piercing shriek of Klytaemnestra is heard from within the palace, then a grim moan. Elektra smiles brightly, knowing that Orest has killed their mother.

==== "Es muss etwas geschehen sein!" ("Something must have happened!") ====
Chrysothemis and the maids run into the courtyard with torches. They realize what is going on, and are horrified. They notice Elektra at the threshold of the door and call out to her. A maid notices the approaching Aegisth outside the palace. Fearing his wrath, she tells the others to run inside. All do so, except for Elektra.

==== "He! Lichter!" ("Torches there!") ====
Aegisth arrives. He is oblivious to what has just occurred; he is ecstatic to have heard that Orest is dead and wishes to speak with the messengers. Elektra, eerily dancing with a torch, happily ushers him inside the palace, reassuring him of her new change of heart.

==== "Helft! Mörder!" ("Help! Murder!") ====
As Aegisth screams and calls for help, Elektra replies: "Agamemnon can hear you."

==== "Elektra! Schwester!" ("Elektra! Sister!") ====
Chrysothemis comes out of the palace stating that Orest is inside and that he has killed Klytaemnestra and Aegisth. A massacre has begun with Orest's followers killing those who supported Aegisth and the Queen.

==== "Ob ich nicht höre?" ("How can I not hear?") ====
Elektra is ecstatic and wants to lead the crowd to dance but at first cannot.

==== "Hörst du denn nicht?" ("Don't you hear?") ====
Chrysothemis and Elektra praise their brother's feat.

==== "Schweig, und tanze." ("Be silent and dance.") ====
At last Elektra begins to dance. As she reaches the climax of her dance, she falls to the ground: Elektra is dead. Horrified, Chrysothemis calls for Orest, but to no avail.

== Style and instrumentation ==
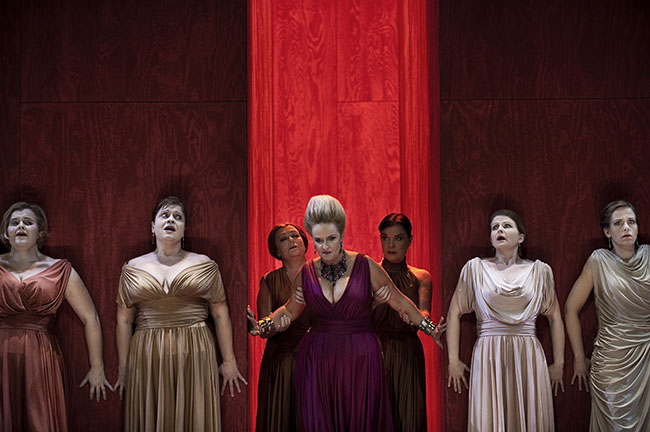
Curtain call at the Royal Swedish Opera in 2009

Musically, Elektra deploys dissonance, chromaticism and extremely fluid tonality in a way which recalls but moves beyond the same composer's Salome of 1905, and thus Elektra represents Strauss's furthest advances in modernism, from which he later retreated. The bitonal or extended Elektra chord is a well known dissonance from the opera while harmonic parallelism is also a prominent modernist technique.

To support the overwhelming emotional content of the opera, Strauss uses an immense orchestra of about 110—one of the largest in opera—with the following instrumentation:

- Woodwinds: 2 piccolos, 4 flutes, 3 oboes, heckelphone, clarinet in E♭, 4 clarinets in B♭ and A, 2 basset horns, bass clarinet, 3 bassoons, contrabassoon
- Brass: 8 French Horns, 4 Wagner tubas, 6 trumpets, bass trumpet, 3 trombones, contrabass trombone, tuba
- Percussion: 6–8 timpani drums (2 players), snare drum, bass drum, switch, 1 pair of crash cymbals, suspended cymbal, tam-tam (gong), triangle, tambourine, 2 pairs of castanets, glockenspiel
- Keyboards: celesta (ad libitum)
- Strings: 2 harps (doubled if possible at the end, so 4), 24 violins divided into three groups (8 in each group), 18 violas divided into three groups (6 in each group), 12 cellos divided into two groups (6 in each group), 8 double basses
- (The 4th flute is omitted in the instrumentation list at the beginning of the score, but there is actually still 4)

In addition to the massive orchestral forces and the large principal cast of singers, a full chorus is briefly used at the end of the opera from "Stimmen hinter der Scene" ("voices behind the scene") calling out the arrival of Orest from within the Palace following the murder of Aegisth.

== Motives and chords ==
Elektra chord
Elektra chord implies an E major and C♯ major chord together (C♯ E♯ G♯ = D♭ F♮ A♭)

The characters in Elektra are characterized in the music through leitmotifs or chords including the Elektra chord, a polychord consisting of E major and C# major stacked on top of each other, building a chain of thirds accompanied by added thirds on top. The final form is an eleventh chord.

Klytaemnestra, in contrast to Agamemnon's clearly diatonic minor triad motif, is characterized by a bitonal six note collection most often represented as a pair of two minor chords a tritone apart, typically on B and F, rather than simultaneously.

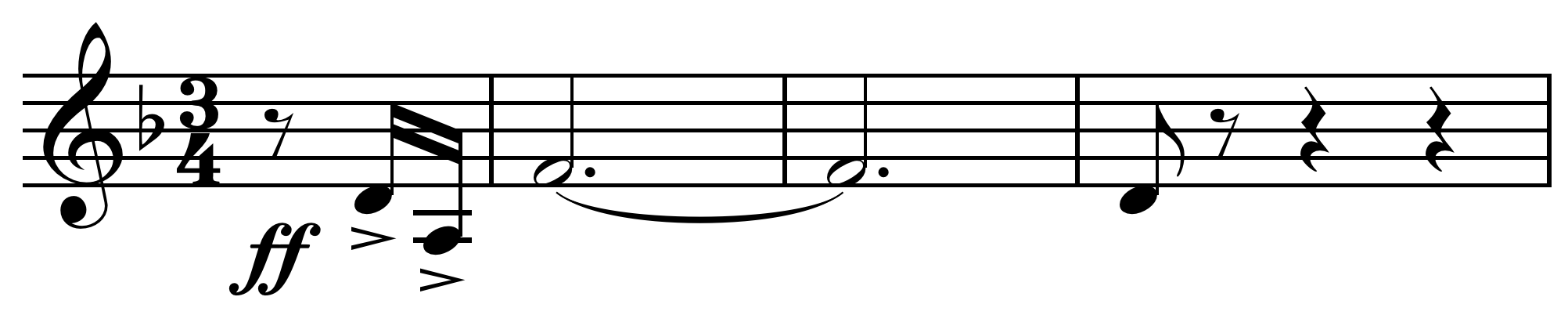
Agamemnon motif

Agamemnon's leitmotif is an arpeggiated D minor triad in the second inversion.
