= Minnie Nast =

German soprano

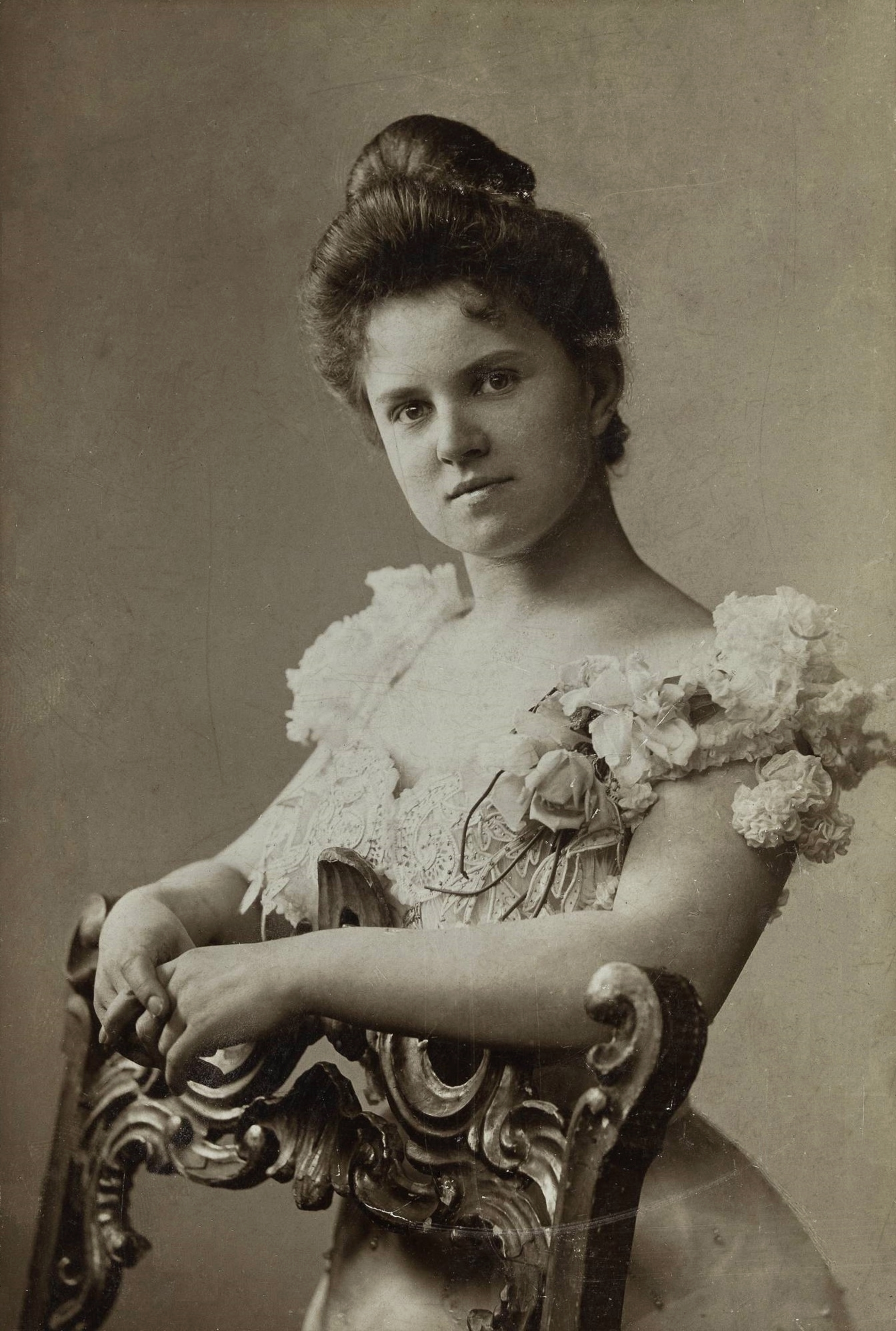
Minnie Nast in 1899, National Museum in Warsaw

Minnie Nast (10 October 1874 – 20 June 1956) was a German soprano. She was born in Karlsruhe and studied at the Karlsruhe Conservatory, making her début at Aachen in 1897.

Nast performed in Dresden from 1898 to 1919 and then taught singing there until the bombing of the city in 1945 during World War II. She also toured in Canada, the United States, Russia, the Netherlands, and England. After the 1907 winter season, a shipwreck cost many of the opera company their lives and made her decide never to tour overseas again.

Nast specialized in light and soubrette roles, especially Mozart, and she created the part of Sophie in Der Rosenkavalier in 1911. Her clear tone and lack of continuous vibrato were echoed by other sopranos of the period. She made some recordings which indicate high technical accomplishment, including her part in the trio from Der Rosenkavalier. She also sang the part of Micaëla in the first recording of Carmen. Nast died in Füssen.

Minnie Nast left recordings for G&T (Dresden 1902 and Berlin 1905-07), Odeon (Berlin 1907 and 1910-11), Gramophone (Dresden 1908 and Berlin 1908-11, among these Micaela in complete "Carmen") and Polyphon (Leipzig 1910). In 1911 she recorded scenes from "Rosenkavalier" with her fellow creators Margarethe Siems and Eva von der Osten for Gramophone and Odeon.

== Literature ==
- Rainer E. Lotz, Axel Weggen und Oliver Wurl: Discographie der deutschen Gesangsaufnahmen Band 2, Birgit Lotz Verlag, Bonn 1998, ISBN 3-9805808-0-6
