= Ilona Eibenschütz =

Hungarian pianist (1871–1967)

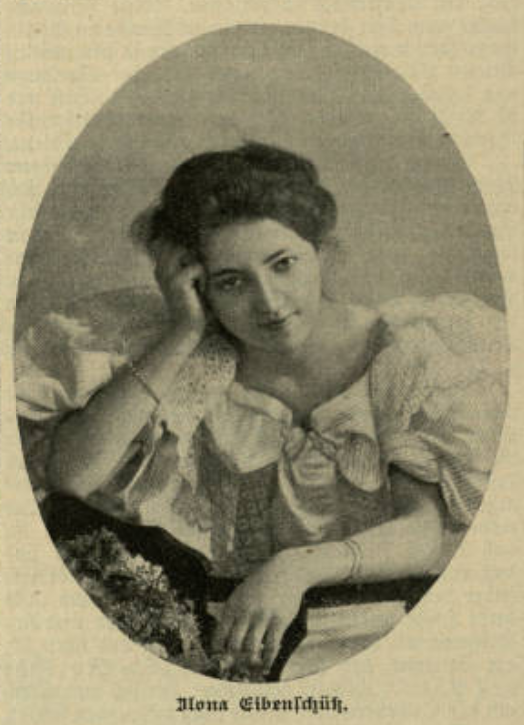
A portrait of Ilona Eibenschütz

Ilona Eibenschütz (24 March 1871 – 21 May 1967) was a Hungarian pianist.

Eibenschütz was introduced to music by her cousin Albert Eibenschütz. Franz Liszt is said to have played at a concert with her when she was five years old. She later studied with Carl Marek, and from 1878 to 1885 at the Leipzig Conservatory under Hans Schmitt, and then, from 1885 to 1890, with Clara Schumann at the Hoch Conservatory in Frankfurt. There she met Johannes Brahms in 1886, and remained close to him until his death in 1897.

Eibenschütz heard Brahms play his own music on various occasions, and in 1926, she wrote (as Mrs. Carl Derenburg) for The Musical Times, "[Brahms] played as if he were improvising, with heart and soul, sometimes humming to himself, forgetting everything around him. His playing was altogether grand and noble, like his compositions."

In the summer of 1893, Brahms privately premiered his piano pieces, Opp. 118 and 119, to Eibenschütz. She later wrote, "It was of course the most wonderful thing for me to hear these pieces as nobody yet knew anything about them. I was the first to whom he played them."

Eibenschütz's teacher, Clara Schumann, was Brahms's closest personal and musical friend, but expressed reservations privately to Brahms about Eibenschütz's playing, writing to him on 1 February 1894 that "she goes too quickly over everything." (The translation is by Jerrold Northrop Moore in his booklet notes to the Pearl CD, "Pupils of Clara Schumann" - Pearl CDS 99049 - which includes recordings of Eibenschütz.)

Starting in 1884, at the age of 12, Eibenschütz annually made a concert tour through Germany, Austria, France, Russia, Denmark, Norway, and Sweden, playing before the Queen of Denmark at Copenhagen, before the Tsar and Tsarina of Russia at the Gatchina Palace, and before the Emperor of Austria at Vienna, by whom she was granted an imperial stipend for five years. Her debut with the Berlin Philharmonic was on 7 November 1890.

== Bibliography ==
- Ehrlich, A: Celebrated Pianists, past and present, p. 93. Edition unclear.
- Musgrave, Michael, "Early trends in the performance of Brahms's piano music." In Musgrave, M., and Sherman, B.D., editors, Performing Brahms: early evidence of performance style (Cambridge University Press, 2003, pp. 302–326.)
- "Pupils of Clara Schumann," Pearl CDS 9909; booklet notes by Jerrold Northrop Moore.
- Derenburg, Mrs. Carl (aka Ilona Eibenschütz), "My Recollections of Brahms." The Musical Times 67/101 (July 1926), pp. 598–600
