= Clementine von Schuch =

German concert and operatic soprano

Clementine Edle von Schuch (24 July 1921 – 29 June 2014) also Clementine von Schuch II bzw. jun.) was a German concert and operatic soprano, but also sang parts written for mezzo-soprano or alto.

== Life and career ==
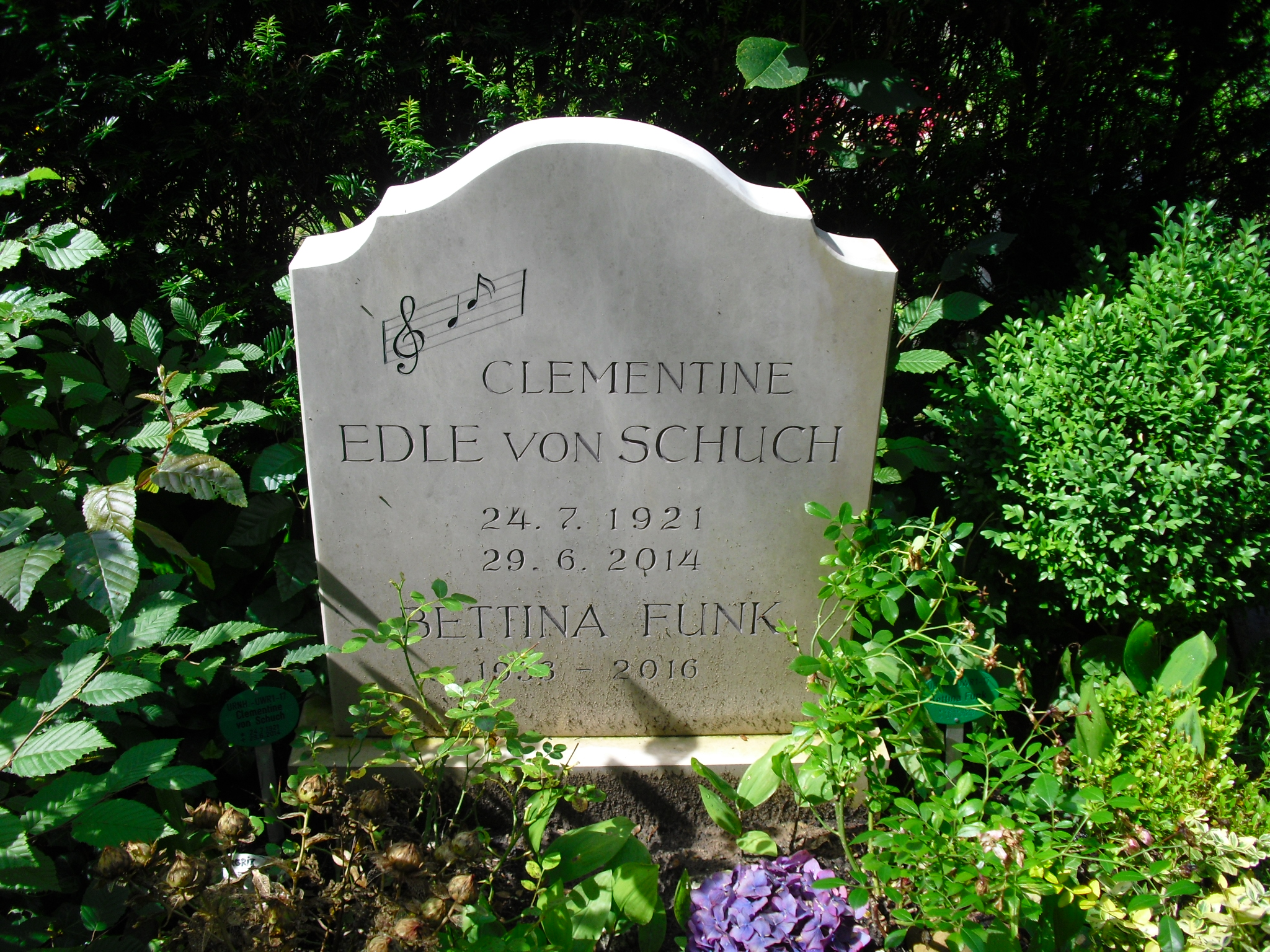
Gravestone for Clementine von Schuch at the Friedhof Lichterfelde

Born in Dresden, Schuch was the daughter of the cellist Hans von Schuch (1886–1963) and his wife Valeria Koslerova, a ballet dancer with the Royal Dresden Ballet Company. She was thus a granddaughter of the eminent Dresden conductor Ernst von Schuch (1847–1914) and his wife, Kammersängerin Clementine von Schuch-Proska (1850–1932). Through her maternal aunt, Klara (Lala) Koszler (i.e. Koslerova), she was related by marriage to Klaus Pringsheim Sr., whose sister Katia was married to Thomas Mann.

Schuch received from her aunt, the coloratura soprano Liesel Schuch-Ganzel (1891–1990), trained in Dresden, after which her first stage engagement was at the Stadttheater Königsberg from 1942 to 1944.

During the first opera performance in Dresden after the Second World War on 10 August 1945, Clementine von Schuch gave the following role at the Kleines Haus auf der Glacisstraße Cherubino (mezzo-soprano) from Mozart's the Marriage of Figaro.

After World War II, she performed at the Semperoper from 1945 to 1947, after which she was engaged by the newly founded Komische Oper Berlin in 1947, where she worked until the 1960s. She sang medium and smaller roles from all areas of opera, such as Mercédès in Bizet's Carmen, Antonia (mezzo-soprano) in Tiefland by Eugen d'Albert, Annina (alto) in Richard Strauss' Der Rosenkavalier, Frugola (alto) in Puccini's Il tabarro, Hortense in Die Wirtin von Pinsk by Richard Mohaupt as well as Sebastian in Arthur Kusterer's Was ihr wollt.

In 1968, she gave Louise (alto) in La Vie parisienne by Jacques Offenbach, with the Berlin Symphony Orchestra under the direction of Franz Allers and the choir of the Deutsche Oper Berlin.

In 2011, Clementine von Schuch, together with two cousins from Berlin, the Schuch granddaughters Brigitte Bela from Bonn (daughter of Käthe von Schuch-Schmidt) and Sabine Lämmel from Saarbrücken, established the Familienstiftung Ernst Edler von Schuch in the sponsorship of the Stadtmuseum Dresden, which presented heirlooms of her important grandparents from their creative period to the Stadtmuseum Dresden. However, this family foundation is not only intended to document the past, but also to promote young musical talent in the future.

Schuch died on 29 June 2014 at the age of 93. She is survived by a daughter. The urn was buried in August 2014 at the Friedhof Lichterfelde.
