= Ganzel =

Ganzel is a surname. Notable people with the name include:

- Babe Ganzel (1901–1978), American baseball player
- Charlie Ganzel (1862–1914), American baseball player
- John Ganzel (1874–1959), American baseball player and manager
- Liesel Schuch-Ganzel (1891–1990), German coloratura soprano
- Teresa Ganzel, American actor and comedian
- Toni M. Ganzel, American otolaryngologist and academic administrator
