= Grace Marilynn James =

American pediatrician

Grace Marilyn James (1923 – 1989) was an American pediatrician in Louisville, Kentucky. When she began practicing medicine in 1953, the hospitals in Louisville were racially segregated by law. At the University of Louisville School of Medicine she was the first African-American physician on the faculty. She was also one of the first two African-American women on the faculty at any southern medical school. Additionally, she was first African-American woman to serve as an attending physician at Louisville's Kosair Children's Hospital.

== Early life and education ==
Grace Marilyn James was born in Charleston, West Virginia, in 1923 to Edward L. James, the owner of a produce company, and Stella Grace Shaw James, the manager of the local post office. James attended West Virginia State College. She completed post-graduate work at West Virginia State College and the University of Chicago. She graduated from Meharry Medical College in Nashville, Tennessee with an M.D. degree in 1950. James relocated to New York City and completed a pediatric residency at Harlem Hospital. Additionally, she studied child psychiatry at Creedmoor State Hospital in Queens Village and becoming a fellow at the Albert Einstein College of Medicine.

== Pediatric career ==
James relocated to Louisville in 1953 to open a private pediatrics practice and a walk-in clinic for children living in Louisville's impoverished "West End". She worked for the Louisville city and Jefferson County Health Department, and was a pediatrician for the West End Day Care Center. James joined the University of Louisville School of Medicine as an instructor in child health. Over time she joined the staff of eight Louisville-area hospitals. She was the first African-American woman on the staff of Louisville Children's Hospital and one of only two black women on the faculty of a medical school located in the southern area of United States. James was the first African-American woman to be granted membership in the Jefferson County Medical Society.

== Death and legacy ==
James was honored as a Kentucky Women Remembered with her portrait was added to an exhibit in the Kentucky State Capital Rotunda.

In 2020, Grace James Academy of Excellence was opened in Louisville, Kentucky. This all-girls public school pays tribute to James' legacy with an Afrocentric curriculum and a strong spirit of sisterhood that seeks to teach and empower all students.
