= University of Louisville School of Medicine =

Medical school in Louisville, Kentucky, US

Coordinates: 38°14′54.2″N 85°44′54.6″W

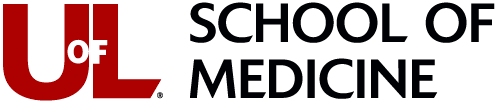
- Type: Public
- Established: 1837; 189 years ago
- Parent institution: University of Louisville
- Endowment: $480.9 million
- Dean: Jeffrey M. Bumpous (interim)
- Students: 630
- Location: Louisville, Kentucky, U.S.
- Campus: Urban
- Colors: Red, Black, Yellow, Gray
- Website: louisville.edu/medicine

The University of Louisville School of Medicine at the University of Louisville is a medical school located in Louisville, Kentucky, United States. Opened as the Louisville Medical Institute in 1837, it is one of the oldest medical schools in North America and the ninth oldest in the United States.

University of Louisville researchers achieved the first implantation of the first fully self-contained artificial heart, the first successful hand transplant in the world, the first five hand transplants in the United States and nine hand transplants in eight recipients as of 2008, the first discovery of embryonic-like stem cells in adult human bone marrow, and the first proof that adult nasal stem cells can grow to become other types of cells. In 2013, U.S. News & World Report ranked the University of Louisville School of Medicine #76 in research in its annual list of Best Medical Schools in the United States.

The school offers several dual degree programs including MD/MS, MD/MA, MD/MBA, MD/MPH, and MD/PhD degrees, with its MD/PhD program receiving Medical Scientist Training Program (MSTP) designation in 2026. For the 2017 entering class, 162 students enrolled in the Doctor of Medicine (M.D.) program.

== History ==
=== Louisville Medical Institute ===
By the early 1830s, Louisville had become a center for inland transportation into the United States. Seeking to develop cultural institutions, citizens (notably town trustee and future United States Secretary of the Treasury James Guthrie) called for a medical school to be founded in Louisville. The city government appropriated funds for a new medical school at Eighth and Chestnut Streets. Much of the Louisville Medical Institute's early faculty came from Transylvania Medical Institute in Lexington, Kentucky.

Theodore Stout Bell, a prominent physician at Transylvania Medical Institute, helped initiate this faculty transfer by suggesting that Louisville would have better clinical cadavers for medical study than Lexington. Classes at the Louisville Medical Institute began in temporary quarters in fall 1837, eventually moving to a building designed by Kentucky architect Gideon Shryock eight months later. Clinical teaching took part in the wards of Louisville City Hospital (now University Hospital). By the early 1840s, University of Louisville School of Medicine had become a distinguished center for medical education, attracting students from a wide variety of locations in the southern and western United States.

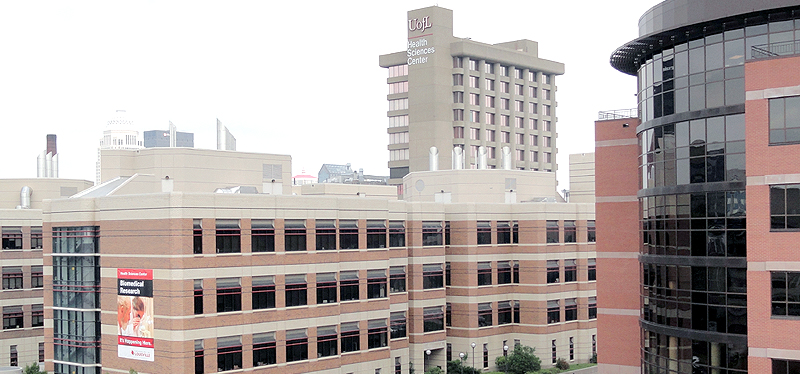
University of Louisville Health Sciences Campus

=== University of Louisville Medical Department ===
In 1846, by ruling of the Kentucky Legislature, the Louisville Medical Institute became the Medical Department of the newly founded University of Louisville. Many notably physicians and researchers became affiliated with the medical department, including Daniel Drake, Charles Wilkins Short, J. Lawrence Smith, Benjamin Silliman, and David Wendel Yandell.

In the early 1950s, Grace Marilynn James joined the faculty of the University of Louisville School of Medicine as the first African American women on staff towards ending racial segregation in Louisville area hospitals and medical professional organizations.

In 1972, John Howard Wallace became the first African American to be a chairperson of a department of microbiology in a non-HBCU medical school when he became chair of the Department of Microbiology and Immunology at the University of Louisville Medical School.

In May 2013, Toni M. Ganzel was selected as the next dean of the School of Medicine.

== Health Sciences Center ==
The 1960s saw a period of major growth in the University of Louisville Medical Department. University officials began construction of a Health Sciences Center, where health-related study and research would take place and the School of Medicine would be located. The Health Sciences Center included a 120,000-square-foot Medical-Dental Research Building (opened in 1963), new buildings to house the medical and dental schools, a library, and laboratory buildings. Vice President for health affairs Harold Boyer oversaw state appropriation of funds for the construction of a new teaching hospital and ambulatory care center.

In 1997, the Kentucky General Assembly approved House Bill 1, also known as the Higher Education Reform Act. It included the mandate that the University of Louisville become a premier metropolitan research university by 2020. Today, the Health Sciences Center features over 200,000 square feet of state-of-the-art research facilities, a standardized patient clinic and one of the largest academic medical simulation centers in the United States.

There are five hospitals within walking distance of the Health Sciences Center campus, with the VA Hospital 5 minutes away, where students perform their clinical rotations. The Louisville Medical Center serves more than 500,000 patients each year:

- UofL Health
  - University of Louisville Hospital
  - James Graham Brown Cancer Center
  - Jewish Hospital
- Norton Healthcare
  - Norton Children's Hospital
  - Norton Hospital & Norton Healthcare Pavilion
- VA Medical Center – Louisville

== Innovations ==
Throughout its history, the University of Louisville School of Medicine has been a pioneer in terms of modern medical practice and surgical procedure. Notably, the University of Louisville housed the world's first emergency room, opened in 1911 and developed by surgeon Arnold Griswold in the 1930s. Griswold also developed autotransfusion, the process by which a person receives their own blood for a transfusion rather than banked donor blood.

In 1998, Dr. Roberto Bolli led a U of L team that identified an intracellular molecule that could protect the heart from ischemic myocardial damage. This group presented its findings to 40,000 cardiologists at the 1998 American Heart Association (AHA) conference. Dr. Bolli also headed a U of L team that was awarded an $11.7 million grant from the National Heart, Lung, and Blood Institute—part of the National Institutes of Health—to continue to build on this research in 2005, marking the largest nationally competitive NIH grant awarded to the university. NIH reviewers rated the proposed research program as exceedingly innovative and potentially high-impact, noting that it addresses an extremely important clinical problem in a way that will move treatments from the laboratory to the patient as quickly as possible. Using highly unusual language, the reviewers called the proposal "a paradigm of what a program project grant should be." Bolli was the lead author on the SCIPIO trial testing the effects of stem cells in heart failure. The resulting paper was retracted by The Lancet for data falsification. He is or has been on the editorial board of all major cardiovascular journals and was the Editor in Chief of Circulation Research, a post from which he was dismissed for making homophobic comments He has been a member of numerous NIH study sections and committees and is a member of the NHLBI Advisory Council. He also serves as a member of the Board of Directors of the American Heart Association.

Surgeons from the University of Louisville in cooperation with the Kleinert and Kutz Hand Care Center and Jewish Hospital performed the first five hand transplants in the United States. The Hand Center performed one of the world's first cross-hand replantations, first reported repair of the digital arteries, first bilateral upper arm replantation, first bilateral forearm replantation, first reported successful technique for primary flexor tendon repair, and first vascularized epiphyseal transfer. This center has pioneered work in primary reconstruction using free tissue transfer. The Christine M. Kleinert Institute hand surgery fellowship program is one of the top fellowships in the world for hand and microsurgery.

In 2001, University of Louisville and Jewish Hospital physicians and researchers, Drs. Laman A. Gray Jr. and Robert D. Dowling, performed the world's first implantation of the AbioCor Implantable Replacement Heart on July 2, in a seven-hour procedure at Jewish Hospital in Louisville, Kentucky. University of Louisville cardiothoracic surgeons have performed many other novel procedures, including Kentucky's first heart transplant, the world's first heart transplant following the use of a Thoratec left ventricular assist device, the world's first endoscopic saphenous vein harvest and the first ventricular remodeling in the region.

The James Graham Brown Cancer Center, an affiliate of Kentucky One Health and University of Louisville School of Medicine, has made several discoveries that have brought the center international attention. These discoveries include:

- First description of Very Small Embryonic-like Stem Cells
  - These "embryonic-like" stem cells, which are isolated from bone marrow, will revolutionize clinical applications of stem cells and further the understanding of cancer metastasis
- First development of a tobacco-based cancer vaccine
  - Drs. A. Bennett Jenson and Shin-je Ghim, innovators of the world's first 100% effective cancer vaccine have begun work to develop a less expensive vaccine with an increased spectrum of activity. This vaccine will be produced in tobacco plants, one of Kentucky's abundant crops.
- First clinical use of G-rich oligonucleotide aptamer therapy for cancer
  - Drs. Trent and Bates discovered a new growth inhibitor activity of G-rich oligonucleotides which have proved effective in early phase clinical trials with no toxicity noted in humans. The drug, AS1411, is now in Phase II clinical trials.
- First atomic-level study of lung cancer metabolism in human patients
  - Scientists in the Structural Biology Program have used nuclear magnetic resonance (NMR) to follow glucose metabolized by patients with lung cancer to demonstrate differences between normal and malignant lung tissue
- First use of digoxin to enhance the effects of chemotherapy in lung cancer
  - James Graham Brown Cancer researchers used laboratory findings to design a clinical trial in which the cardiac drug, digoxin, is used as a supplement of chemotherapy treatment. Early results from the trial suggested the treatment will result in the highest response rate for melanoma ever reported.
- First use of beta-glucan as an immunostimulant for human cancer therapy
  - Brown Cancer researchers, led by Dr. Gordon Ross, discovered that beta-glucan can markedly enhance the immune response of mice to injected tumors. This treatment is now being tested for the first time in humans at the University of Louisville and Memorial Sloan-Kettering Cancer Center in New York.
- First use of colored berries to prevent cancer in high risk individuals
  - Dr. Ramesh Gupta is the first to show that colored berries can prevent the development of cancer in animals and is preparing the first human clinical trial using this approach.

Brown Cancer Center scientists have developed three novel cancer treatments that are in early phase trials. Additionally, at least twenty-seven new drugs or targets which are in various stages of preclinical testing have also been developed. These treatments mark one of the most robust pipelines of any cancer center in the world. Accordingly, a biotech company partially owned by the University of Louisville/Brown Cancer Center, Advanced Cancer Therapeutics, has been initiated to ensure drugs are developed locally and quickly. The goal of the cancer center is to achieve National Cancer Institute designation, a goal they are on track to receive in the near future.

== Students ==
The general applicant pool has become increasingly competitive. Kentucky residents are selected for 120 of the approximately 155 seats in the School of Medicine program each year. Out of state seats are awarded to those with superior academic achievement, MCAT scores, research, community service and/or ties to Kentucky.

The entering Class of 2013 consisted of:

- An overall GPA of 3.64; with BCPM (science) GPA average of 3.56
- An average MCAT score of 10 in each test area; O in Writing Sample (30/O)
- 63 Colleges and Universities represented
- 32 of the matriculates were University of Louisville graduates
- 60% male, 40% female
- African Americans make up 7% of the class

The School of Medicine offers several joint degree programs including MD/MA through the Interdisciplinary Master of Arts in Bioethics and Medical Humanities, MD/MS through the School of Public Health & Information Sciences, MD/MBA through the UofL College of Business, and MD/PhD through any of the basic research departments in the School of Medicine: Biochemistry & Molecular Biology, Pharmacology & Toxicology, Anatomy & Neurobiology, Microbiology & Immunology and Physiology & Biophysics. Arrangements can be made in special cases to design a program based in one of the degree-granting programs located at UofL's Belknap Campus.

Upon matriculation, each incoming student is assigned to one of six Advisory Colleges.

- Moore College
- Bodine College
- Fitzbutler College
- Gross College
- Yandell College
- Pickett College

== Notable alumni ==
- Irvin Abell, M.D.
- Anthony Atala, M.D.
- Milton Diamond, American sexologist and professor of anatomy and reproductive biology
- C. Ronald Kahn, M.D.
- Jennifer A. Koch, M.D.
- Judith Ann Pachciarz, M.D.
- Maurice Rabb Jr., M.D.
- Dorothy 'Dot' Richardson, M.D.
- Prateek Sharma
- James Henry Wayland
- Raymond L. Woosley Jr., M.D.
