= Kosair Charities =

- Formation: 1923
- Headquarters: Kosair Crippled Children Hospital
- Location: 982 Eastern Parkway, Louisville, Kentucky
- Region served: Kentuckiana
- Website: http://www.kosair.org/

Kosair for Kids is a nonprofit organization based in Louisville, Kentucky. Founded in 1923, the organization helps children with medical conditions in Kentucky and southern Indiana. It ran the Kosair Cripple Children Hospital until 1982 and subsequently partnered with Norton Healthcare to run Kosair Children's Hospital until 2016. The group partners with over 100 pediatric organizations in the area to provide assistance to youth in the area.

== History ==
A division of the Kosair Shriners since 1923, Kosair for Kids has operated as a nonprofit organization helps children with medical conditions in Kentucky and southern Indiana. The charity is headquartered in the former Kosair Crippled Children Hospital at 982 Eastern Parkway in Louisville, Kentucky. The hospital was run as a pediatric hospital until 1982. Kosair closed its hospital to help pay for a new one downtown with Norton Healthcare that was named Kosair Children's Hospital until 2016.

== Work ==
Various causes that Kosair for Kids has contributed to include hospital funding and having a school for the blind and a school for children with autism. They host an events for children with medical problems and help with children's with medical expenses. Kosair for Kids partners with over 100 pediatric organizations in the area to provide assistance to youth in Kentuckiana.

== See also ==
- Kosair Shrine Circus
- Shriners Hospitals for Children
- Royal Masonic Hospital
- Old Scottish Rite Hospital building
