= Hans von Schuch =

German cellist and music educator

Hans von Schuch (19 June 1886 – 24 November 1963) was a German cellist and music educator.

== Life ==
Born in Niederlößnitz (now part of Radebeul) in the Kingdom of Saxony, Schuch grew up with his parents, the conductor Ernst von Schuch and the opera singer Clementine von Schuch-Proska, in his native town. He was a brother of the coloratura soprano Liesel Schuch-Ganzel and the soprano Käthe von Schuch-Schmidt. His daughter Clementine von Schuch (1921-2014) also became an opera singer.

Schuch studied at the Hochschule für Musik Carl Maria von Weber and was engaged as a violoncellist in Berlin, Vienna and Dresden. From 1915 he was active as a music teacher.

Schuch died on November 24, 1963, in Dresden at the age of 77.
