= Kosair Shrine Circus =

Annual circus in Louisville, Kentucky

The Kosair Shrine Circus is an annual Shrine circus held in Louisville, Kentucky, done for the Kosair Charities of the Oasis of Louisville Kosair Shrine, a group of Freemasonry that stress fun and fellowship. The first circus was held in 1925.

On February 7, 2006, the Humane Society of the United States issued a press statement calling for a boycott of the circus as it came to Louisville, due to the Kosair Shrine Circus offering elephant rides to visiting patrons. A countywide animal riding ban was instated in 1990 for all performing animal acts as a result of a man being injured while wrestling a bear. Circus members asked for elephant rides to be reinstated, citing opportunities to increase annual revenue. In December 2005 the Louisville Metro Council voted to allow the elephant rides to take place.

== See also ==
- List of attractions and events in the Louisville metropolitan area
