= Arthur Kusterer =

German composer and conductor

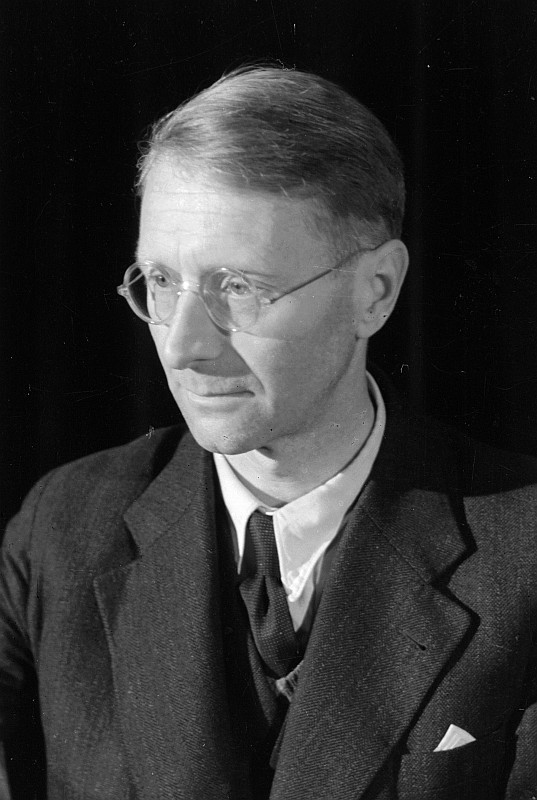
Arthur Kusterer (1945)

Arthur Kusterer (14 June 1898 – 23 December 1967) was a German composer and conductor. His best-known work is his opera adaptation of Shakespeare's Twelfth Night.

== Life ==
Born in Karlsruhe, Kusterer attended from 1913 until 1916 the Badisches Konservatorium there. He worked from 1917 until 1919 as a pianist and répétiteur at the Badisches Staatstheater Karlsruhe. Until 1936, he lived as a freelance composer in his home town and had success on "many German stages" with stage works in the Spieloper genre, such as Was ihr wollt and Diener zweier Herren. From 1936 to 1945, he taught at the Berlin University of Music. On August 16, 1945, Kusterer conducted the first complete opera performance in devastated post-war Berlin: Rossini's The Barber of Seville at the Friedenau Theater (located within the Friedenau Town Hall), directed by Cornelis Bronsgeest. From 1950 to 1958, he served as the musical director of the Opera Studio at the Komische Oper Berlin.

Kusterer died in Altensteig.

== Works ==
- Der kleine Klaus und der große Klaus, opera after Andersen (premiered 1927 in Karlsruhe, conductor Josef Krips)
- Was ihr wollt, opera after Shakespeare's Twelfth Night (1932 in Dresden, conductor Fritz Busch)
- Diener zweier Herren, three act opera after Goldoni's The Servant of Two Masters (1936 in Mannheim)
- Katarina, opera (1939 in Berlin, conductor Artur Rother)
- Gloriolus, comic opera in two acts after Miles Gloriosus by Plautus (composed in 1955–61)
- Konzert für Streichorchester (1950 at Ludwigsburg Festival)
