= Toni M. Ganzel =

American otolaryngologist and academic administrator

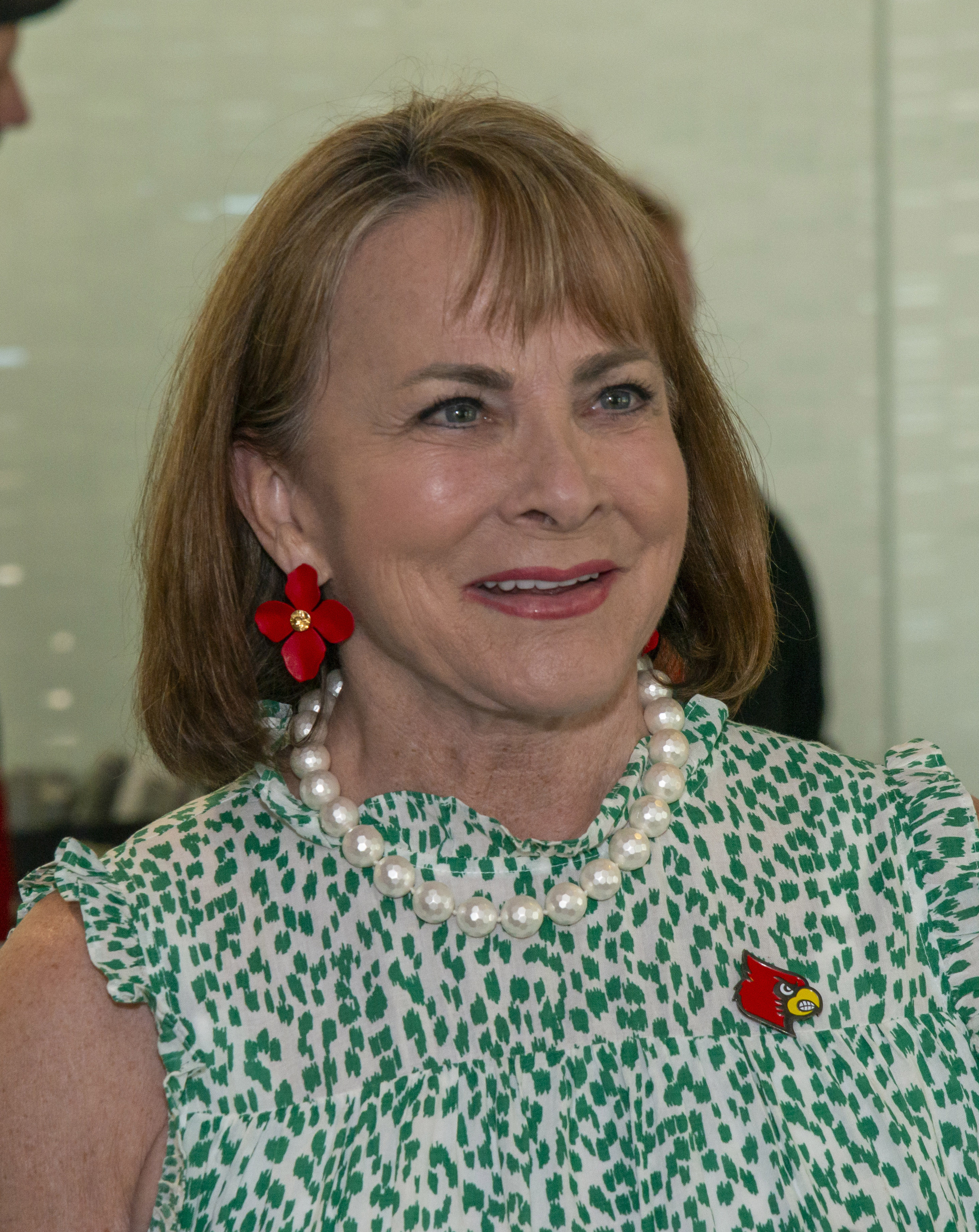
- Ganzel in 2023
- Education: University of Nebraska–Lincoln; University of Nebraska Medical Center; University of St. Thomas
- Scientific career
- Fields: Otolaryngology
- Workplaces: Creighton University; University of Louisville

Toni M. Ganzel is an American otolaryngologist and academic administrator who was the 24th dean of the University of Louisville School of Medicine from 2012 to 2023.

== Life ==
Ganzel is from New Mexico. Her family lived in Nebraska while her father was stationed at Offutt Air Force Base with the Strategic Air Command. She received a B.S. and M.D. (1978) from the University of Nebraska–Lincoln. Ganzel completed an otolaryngology at the University of Nebraska Medical Center. In 2000, she earned a M.B.A. focusing on medical group management from the University of St. Thomas.

Ganzel was a faculty member at the Creighton University School of Medicine. In 1983, she joined the University of Louisville School of Medicine as an assistant professor of otolaryngology. From 1989 to 2002, she was chief of otolaryngology at Kosair Children’s Hospital. She was director of the division of otolyngology at the University of Louisville from 1993 to 2001. She served as associate dean of student affairs at the medical school from 2001 to 2003 when she was promoted to senior associate dean for students and academic affairs. She is a fellow of the American College of Surgeons. In March 2012, Ganzel succeeded Edward C. Halperin as the interim dean of the school of medicine. She was appointed as the 24th dean on June 1, 2013. She is the first woman to hold the role. Ganzel retired in June 2023 and was succeeded by interim dean Jeffrey M. Bumpous.
