= Käthe von Schuch-Schmidt =

German soprano

Kät(h)e von Schuch-Schmidt (18 March 1885 in Dresden as Katharine Johanna Henriette Wilhelmine Clementine Schuch – 1973 in Munich) was a German soprano.

Schuch grew up with her parents, the conductor Ernst von Schuch and the opera singer Clementine von Schuch-Proska, in Niederlößnitz (today a district of Radebeul). She was a sister of the coloratura soprano Liesel Schuch-Ganzel and the violoncellist Hans von Schuch.

From 1910 to 1912, Schuch was engaged as a court opera singer in Dessau, after which she performed as a concert singer. After her marriage, she was also known as Käte von Schuch-Schmidt or Käthe Schmidt.
