= Clementine von Schuch-Proska =

Austrian operatic coloratura soprano

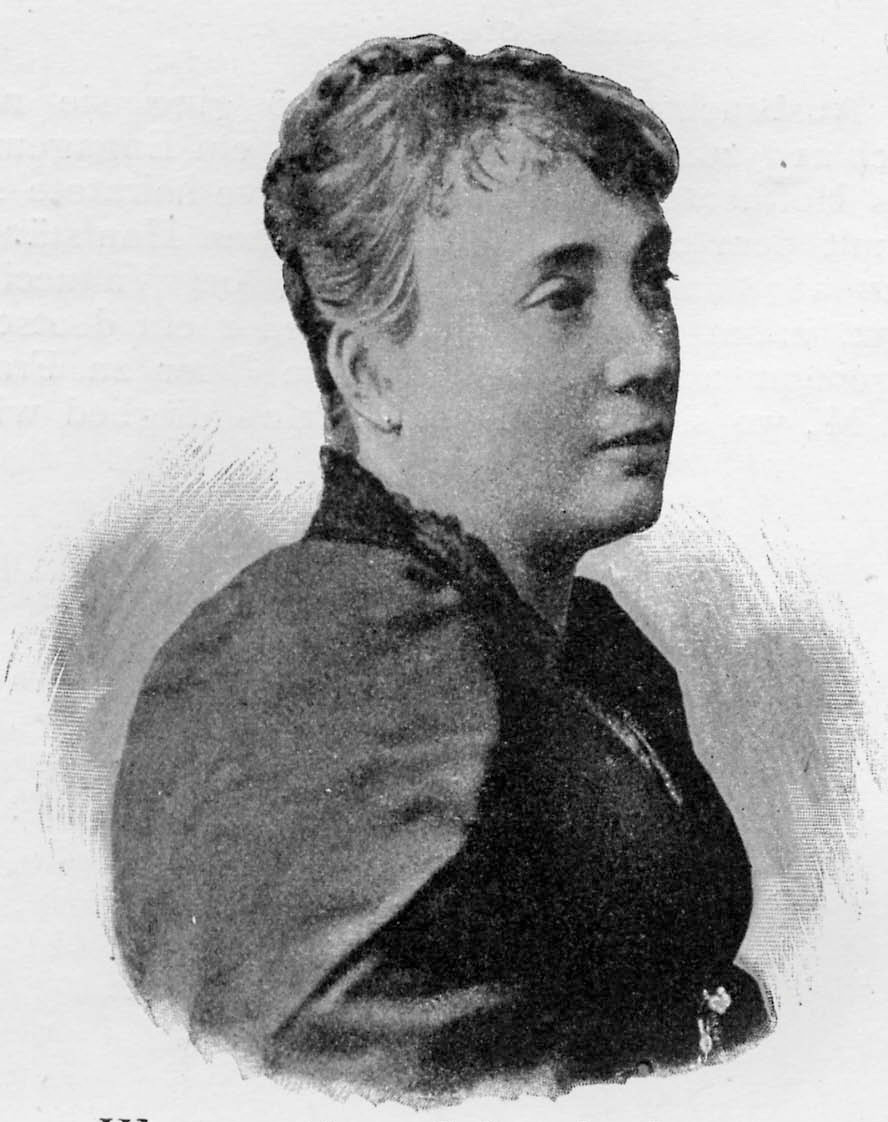
Clementine von Schuch-Proska

Clementine Edle von Schuch-Proska, née Procházka, (12 February 1850 – 8 June 1932) was an Austrian operatic coloratura soprano, who became an audience favourite and an honorary member of the Dresden Court Opera as Kammersängerin.

== Life and activity ==
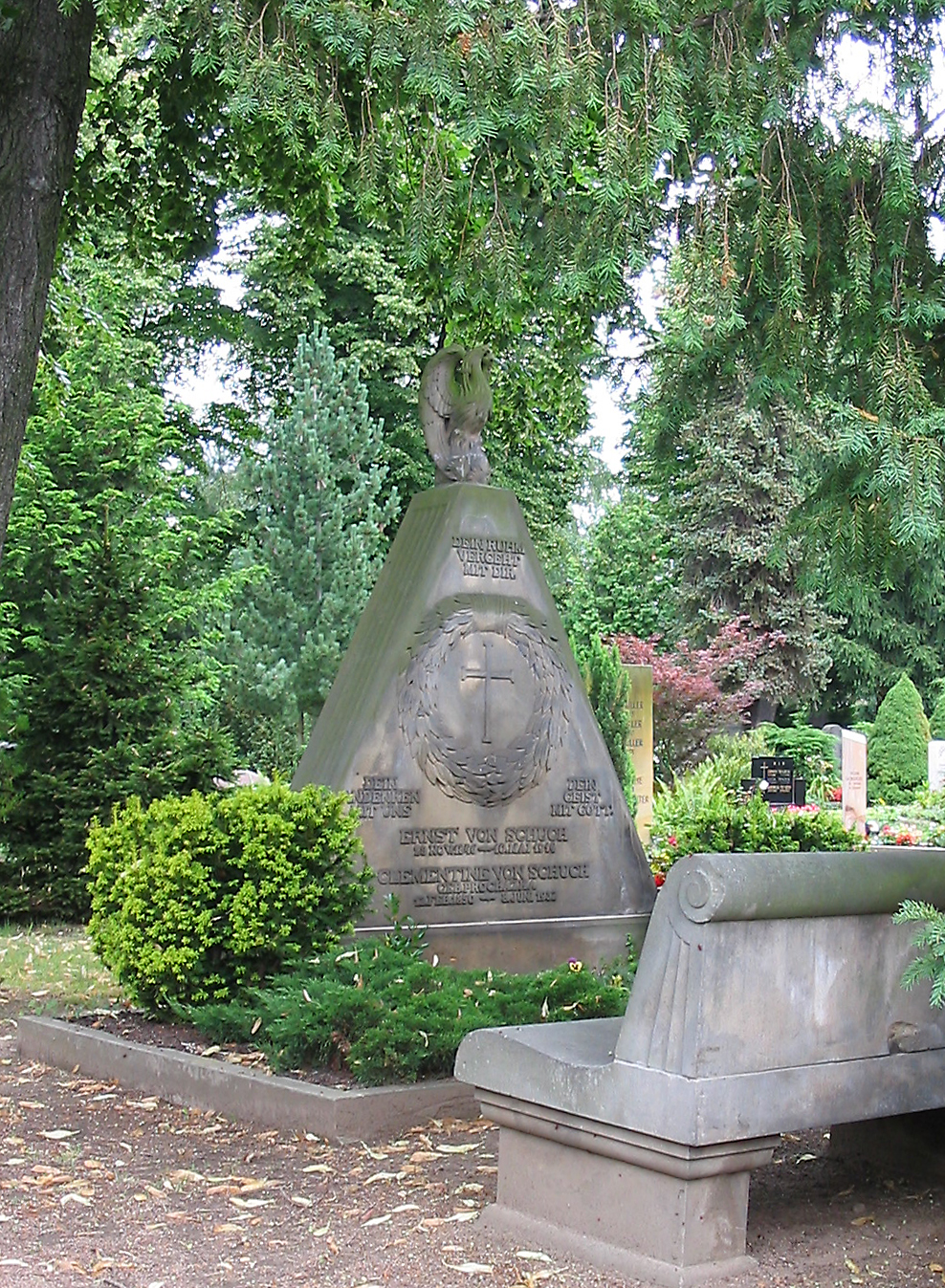
Grave of Ernst von Schuch and Clementine von Schuch-Proska at the Radebeul-West Cemetery

Born in Sopron, Prochazka studied at the Gesellschaft der Musikfreunde in Wien with Mathilde Marchesi. Immediately afterwards, in 1873, she was engaged to sing the debut role of Norina in Donizetti's Don Pasquale as coloratura soprano in Dresden at the Semperoper, where she became an audience favourite. In 1878, she received the appointment of Royal Chamber Singer.

Schuch-Proska had been married since 1875 to the conductor Ernst von Schuch (1846-1914). They took up residence in 1882 in Niederlößnitz in Weintraubenstraße (renamed in 1883 at their own request to Schuchstraße 15/17).

Guest appearances took her to Vienna in 1875 with the opera Lo speziale by Joseph Haydn, and later as an opera and concert singer at leading German theatres (Vienna Court Opera in 1881, 1882 and Berlin in 1881 as well as Zurich City Theatre in 1880) as well as to Moscow and St. Petersburg. At the Covent Garden Opera in London in 1884 she sang Eva in Wagner's Die Meistersinger von Nürnberg and Ännchen in Weber's Der Freischütz. The composer Pittrich, as Kammersängerin 1891, dedicated two of his early works written in Dresden to her the "Wiegendlied" and the song "Mägdlein, nimm dich in Acht" which became "immediately popular".

After her official retirement in 1894 with her former debut role as Norina in Donizetti's Don Pasquale, she still performed occasionally as a guest in Dresden until 1898, when she was made an honorary member. She was raised to the peerage by the Austrian Emperor in 1898 with her husband Ernst von Schuch. She was also awarded the medal "Virtuti et Ingenio" for her artistic achievements.

Schuch-Proska died in Kötzschenbroda, today Radebeul) at the age of 82. She is buried together with her husband in the Friedhof Radebeul-West, near her daughter Liesel.

Her daughter Liesel Schuch-Ganzel (1891-1990), the youngest of five children, and her elder sister Käthe (1885-1973; also née Ullmann and Schmidt respectively) also embarked on singing careers. The son Hans von Schuch (1886-1963), became a well-known cellist. His daughter Clementine von Schuch (1921-2014) also became an opera singer.

== Roles ==
- Königin der Nacht in The Magic Flute by Mozart
- Zerline in Don Giovanni by Mozart
- Ännchen in Der Freischütz by Carl Maria von Weber
- Marguerite in Faust by Charles Gounod
- Juliette in Roméo et Juliette by Charles Gounod
- Violetta in La traviata by Giuseppe Verdi
- Eva in Die Meistersinger von Nürnberg by Richard Wagner

== Honours and awards ==
In 1898, the Kammersängerin and her husband Ernst Schuch were raised to hereditary nobility by the Austrian Emperor Franz Joseph I with the title Edle von. At her stage farewell in the same year, which she gave with one of her signature roles, Norina in Donizetti's Don Pasquale, she was appointed honorary member of the Dresden Court Opera by the King Albert of Saxony.

Schuch received several awards in the course of her work:

- Saxony: Great Golden Medal Virtuti et ingenio (1887)
- Vereinigte herzogliche Häuser (Sachsen-Altenburg, Sachsen-Coburg und Gotha und Sachsen-Meiningen): Verdienstkreuz des Saxe-Ernestine House Order (1885)
- Austria-Hungary: Golden Medal for Art and Science (1881, (predecessor of the K.u.k. Österreichisches Ehrenzeichen für Kunst und Wissenschaft), Civilian Medal of Honour (1881)
- Italy: Gold Médaille of Amadeus Herzog von Aosta (1884)
- Romania: Medaille Bene Merenti I. Classe (1888)

== Artist family ==
The parents Ernst and Clementine von Schuch were followed by two further generations of musically gifted descendants:

- Ernst von Schuch (1846-1914), conductor and GMD ⚭ Clementine von Schuch-Proska (1850-1932), Kammersängerin (coloratura soprano)
  - Käthe von Schuch-Schmidt (1885-1973), soprano
  - Hans von Schuch (1886-1963), cellist
  - Clementine von Schuch (1921-2014), soprano
  - Liesel Schuch-Ganzel (1891-1990), Kammersängerin (coloratura soprano)
