= Judith Ann Pachciarz =

American physician

Judith Ann Pachciarz (born 1941) is an American pathologist. She is the first deaf woman in the United States to obtain an M.D. and a Ph.D.

== Early life and education ==
Raised in Danville, Illinois, Pachciarz lost her hearing at the age of two, due to encephalomeningitis, an inflammation of the brain which caused extensive nerve damage. From an early age she wanted to become a physician. She attended Schlarman High School and was named an Illinois State Scholar. After graduating from high school, she went on to earn a Master of Science degree at the University of Illinois in 1965 and a Ph.D. in microbiology and immunology at St. Louis University in 1971. As a scientist, she conducted academic research at the University of Minnesota and the University of Florida. From 1974 to 1979 she taught veterinary science at the University of Kentucky and worked with horses.

However, her deafness long proved a bar to her medical ambitions. It was not until 1979, that she was finally accepted by a medical school, the University of Louisville School of Medicine.

== Career ==
Following her graduation from medical school in 1983, Dr. Pachciarz completed a five year residency in pathology at the Veterans Administration Medical Center in West Los Angeles, serving as chief resident in pathology for the final year. In 1985 Dr. Pachciarz served as medical director for the World Games for the Deaf in Los Angeles, supervising a staff of 200 caring for 2,100 athletes from 32 nations.

Dr. Pachciarz then completed a fellowship in transfusion medicine and blood banking, and became board certified in anatomic and clinical pathology, and in transfusion medicine. She practiced as a pathologist and director of the blood transfusion service for Los Angeles County hospitals at Charles R. Drew University of Medicine and Science in Los Angeles. Dr. Pachciarz retired in 2007.

Known to friends and family as "Dr. Judy", she has had a lifelong love of sports, participating in basketball and softball in her early years. She ran the 1978 New York City Marathon, and continues to bicycle and compete in senior women's golf tournaments. Dr. Judy loves dogs and is partial to greyhounds, because "they depend on their sight".

Dr. Pachciarz has distinguished herself in many ways during her lifetime as a scientist, practicing physician, mentor, and athlete. Many deaf persons who are now in medical school or are practicing physicians have cited her as an inspiration.
