= Jennifer A. Koch =

American internist

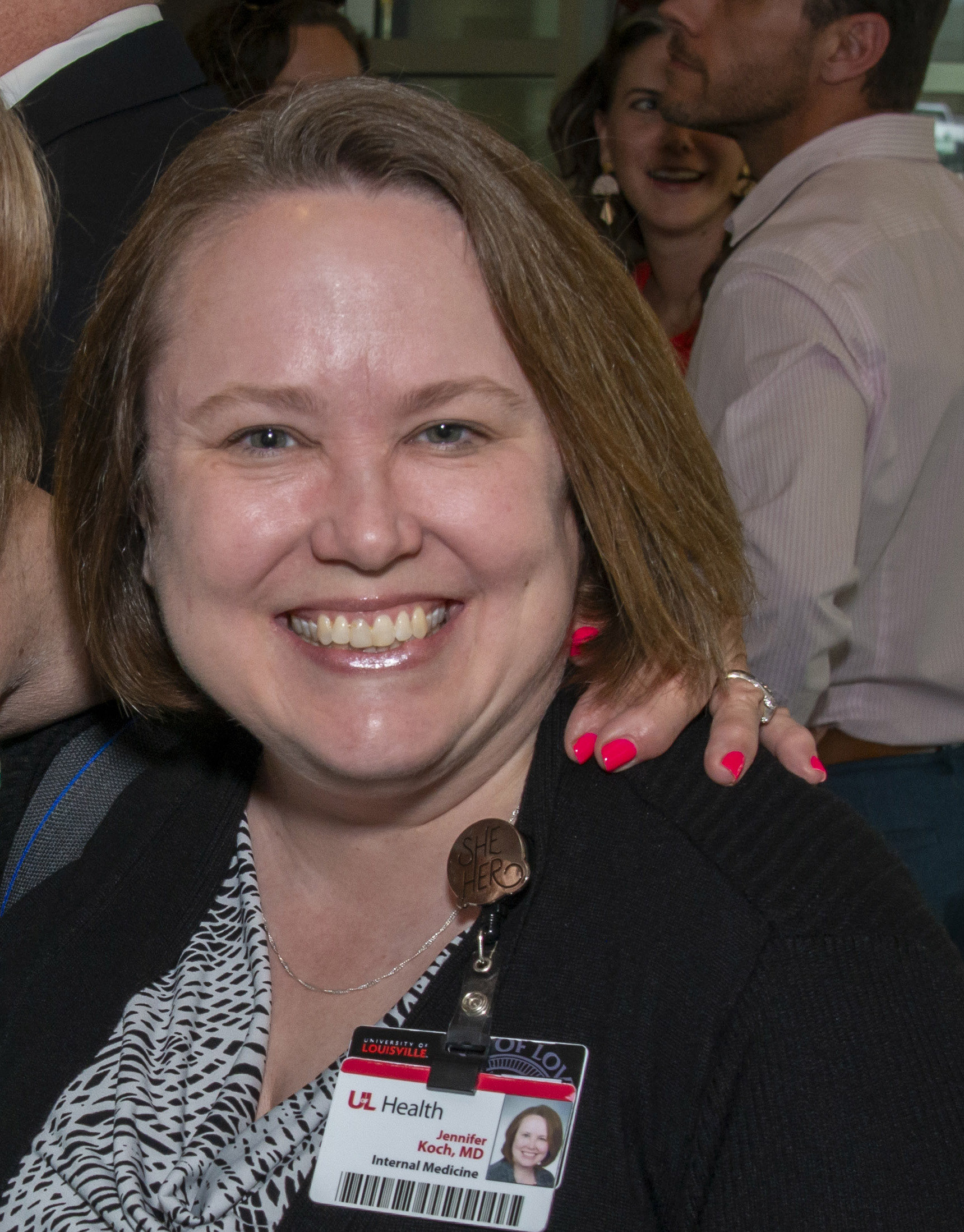
- Koch in 2023
- Education: University of Louisville
- Scientific career
- Fields: Internal medicine
- Workplaces: University of Louisville

Jennifer A. Koch is an American internist who is a professor of medicine and vice chair for faculty affairs and education at the University of Louisville School of Medicine. She is the director of the internal medicine residency program. Koch is a fellow of the American College of Physicians. She received her M.D. from the University of Louisville and completed a residency at the University of Louisville Hospital from 2001 to 2004.
