= Norton Healthcare =

Norton Healthcare, Inc.

Geography
- Location: Louisville, Kentucky, U.S.

Organisation
- Care system: Private
- Type: General

Services
- Standards: JCAHO accreditation
- Beds: 1969

History
- Founded: 1886

Links
- Website: nortonhealthcare.com
- Lists: Hospitals in U.S.

Norton Healthcare is a healthcare system with more than 400 clinics and hospitals in and around Louisville, Kentucky. The hospital and health care system is the Louisville area's second-largest private employer, located at more than 140 locations throughout Greater Louisville, and Southern Indiana. It includes six hospitals, one being in Madison, Indiana, (with ongoing expansion into Southern Indiana), and with 1,993 licensed beds, eight outpatient centers, 18 Norton Immediate Care Centers, over 14,500 employees, over 1,500 employed medical providers, and approximately 2,000 total physicians on its medical staff.

== History ==
What is now known as the predecessor to Norton Healthcare originally started with the actions of the Home Mission Society of St. Paul's Episcopal Church. Mary Louise Sutton Norton led this group to create the John N. Norton Memorial Infirmary in 1886, which was named in honor of her late husband. The hospital system has had multiple influences from religious groups over the years, including the Episcopal Church, United Methodist Church, United Church of Christ, and the Roman Catholic and Presbyterian communities, all of which were dedicated to promoting the idea of health and medical care for the sick and less fortunate.

Also of note is Norton Children's Hospital, which opened in 1892 as Children's Free Hospital. The 267-bed hospital serves as the primary pediatric teaching facility for the University of Louisville School of Medicine.

== Major facilities ==
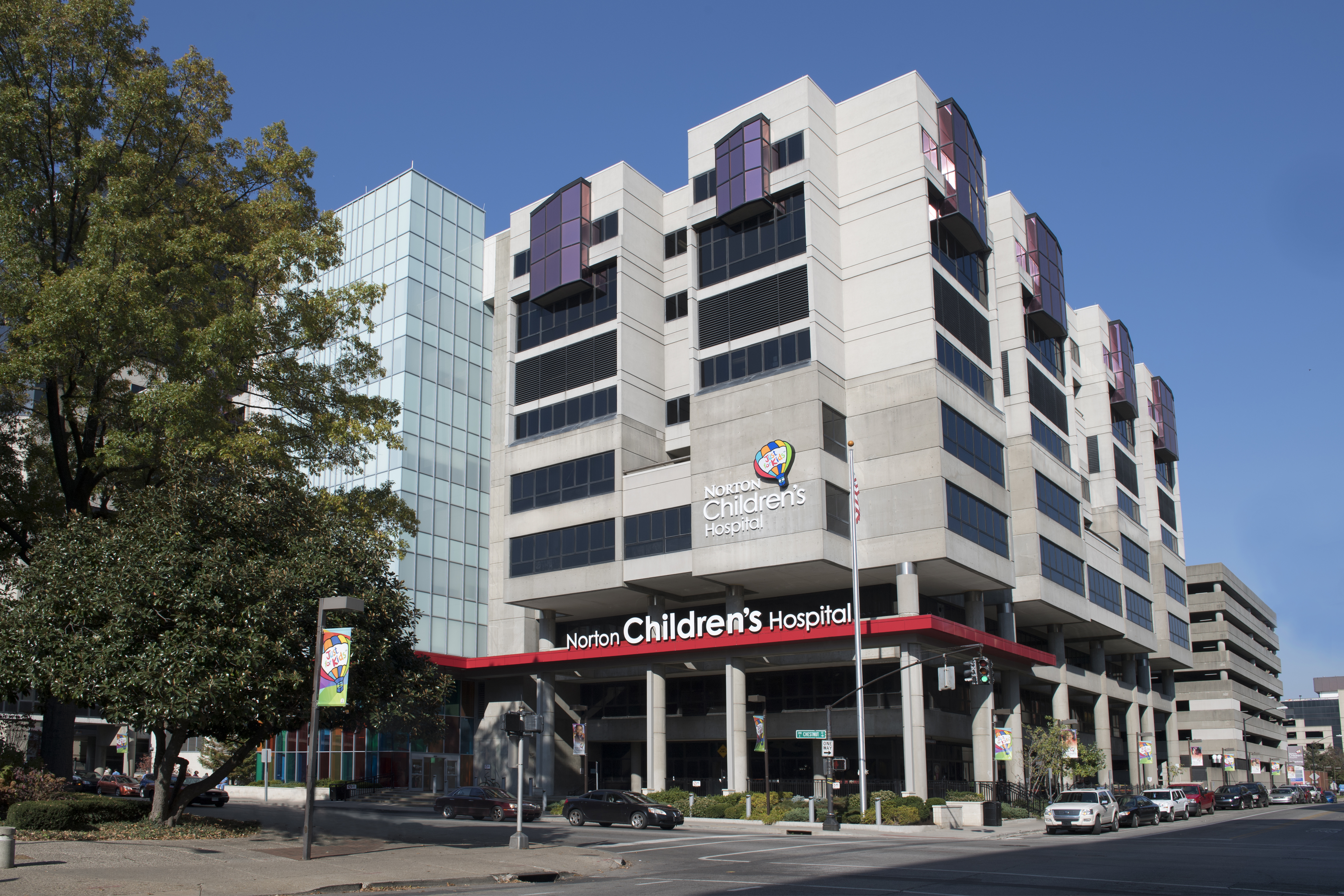
Norton Children's Hospital Downtown Louisville

The system's most notable locations are five acute care hospitals located within Metro Louisville:

- Norton Children's Hospital (300 licensed beds)
- Norton Audubon Hospital (432 licensed beds)
- Norton Hospital & Norton Healthcare Pavilion (634 licensed beds)
- Norton Women's & Children's Hospital (373 licensed beds)
- Norton Brownsboro Hospital (197 licensed beds)
- Norton West Louisville Hospital, newly constructed, opened November 2024.

Norton Healthcare provides services through numerous Immediate Care Centers throughout the greater Louisville area, as well as a Norton Prompt Care clinic inside the KFC Yum! Center. Additionally, Norton Healthcare is expanding its footprint, and services outside of Louisville; Elizabethtown, Frankfort, Bowling Green.

In March 2025, Norton Healthcare announced a $40 million purchase of 156 acres in Louisville's east end, which sits on either side of the intersection of Tucker Station Road, S. Pope Lick Road, Bluegrass Parkway and Lakefront Place near the Papa Johns Waterfall Park. In June 2025, Norton announced its plans for the property, which include building a new pediatric care campus on more than 150 acres that will include Norton's second dedicated children's hospital. A Norton spokesperson said the results of listening sessions will help shape the scope and cost of the project, which could reach a billion dollars. In June 2026, Norton Children's announced plans for expanding its mental health care, and autism services, along with ongoing planning and design work for the new pediatric care, and hospital campus.

In April 2025, Norton Healthcare announced that community donations have exceeded its goal, one year early, with over $200 million for Norton Healthcare and Norton Children's "Just Imagine" campaign.

In October 2025, Norton Healthcare announced a $3.5 million project, towards the opening of new multipurpose athletic fields, in the summer of 2026, at the Norton Healthcare & Learning Center campus in West Louisville.

In August 2026, Norton Healthcare opened the new Norton Pharmacy – Blankenbaker, a nearly $30 million high-tech, centralized, and automated fill prescription facility. The new full-service retail pharmacy offers prescription pickup, and free home delivery to patients across Kentucky and Indiana.

In Southern Indiana:

- Norton King's Daughters' Health in Madison
  - In August 2026, construction begun on 4–5 acres of donated land on Norton King's Daughters' Health's new $6.9 million,10,000-square-foot EMS Transport Hub. It is located in a more strategic location, with six vehicle bays. The new facility includes private resting rooms and a training/simulation lab, and is expected to open in fall 2027.
- Norton Clark Hospital and a new Norton Medical Center in Jeffersonville
- Norton Scott Hospital in Scottsburg

== Major service lines ==
- Norton Cancer Institute – Treatments for brain tumors, bladder cancer, bone cancer, breast cancer, cervical cancer, colon cancer, kidney cancer, leukemia, liver cancer, lung cancer, lymphoma, bone marrow cancer, ovarian cancer, prostate cancer, skin cancer, and uterine cancer.
- Norton Heart Care – Provides diagnostic, medical, interventional and surgical care to patients from Kentucky and Southern Indiana. Norton Audubon Hospital, Norton Brownsboro Hospital and Norton Hospital are accredited Chest Pain Centers certified through the Society of Cardiovascular Patient Care. These facilities serve as regional PCI (percutaneous coronary intervention) receiving centers and provide 24/7 heart attack care for patients throughout Kentucky and Southern Indiana.
- Norton Heart & Vascular Institute – On October 17, 2023, Norton Healthcare opened its new Norton Heart & Vascular Institute, a consolidation of its heart and vascular care services to one location, with a $10 million investment in a 31,000-square-foot building on the Audubon Hospital campus.
- Norton Neuroscience Institute – Established in early 2009, provides treatment for complex neurological disorders through several areas, including pediatrics; stroke care; brain tumor treatment; spine care; epilepsy; movement disorders such as Parkinson's disease; headache and concussion treatment; trauma; injuries; and more.
- Norton Orthopedic Care – Provides orthopedic care in general orthopedics, joint replacement, injuries, trauma, pediatrics, oncology, spinal conditions and sports health. In 2012, Norton Orthopedic Care received The Joint Commission's Gold Seal of Approval for knee and hip replacement.
- Norton Spine Care
- Norton Sports Health – treating sports-related injuries of the shoulder, elbow and knee.
- Norton Weight Management Services – Weight management services are offered. The staff includes two surgeons, two internal medicine physicians trained in bariatrics, nurses, dietitians and mental health professionals.
- Norton Women's Care – services including gynecologic care; obstetrics, including high-risk pregnancy care; newborn care with access to Level III and IV neonatal intensive care units; cancer prevention and treatment, including a breast health program; a women's heart and vascular center; and care for common midlife conditions.
- Kentucky Poison Control Center of Norton Children's Hospital – provides immediate, free, and expert treatment advice and assistance over the telephone, in case of exposure to potentially toxic substances, and venomous plants and animals.

== Employment and market share ==
According to Business First of Louisville, Norton Healthcare is the Louisville area's third largest employer, with more than 17,000 employees. Norton Healthcare employs some 4,000 nurses and has nearly 2,000 affiliated physicians. Additionally, Norton Healthcare has programs in place to support nursing students attending both public and private universities in Kentucky and Indiana. The Norton Healthcare Scholar Program is designed for nursing students to cover the cost of tuition, books, and room and board.

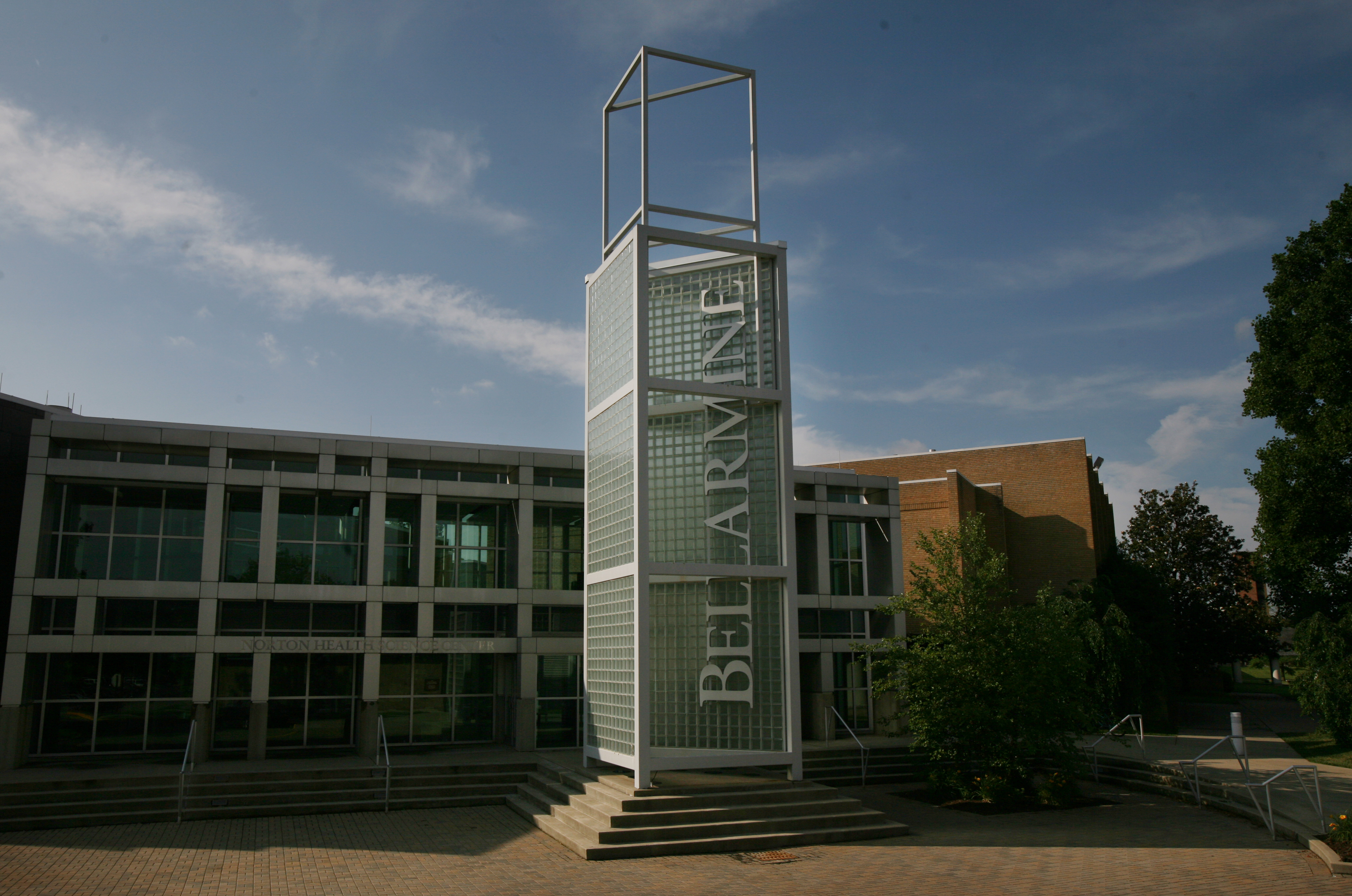
Norton Health Science Center at Bellarmine University

In 2004, Norton Healthcare built a 30,000-square-foot, Norton Health Science Center, on the Bellarmine University campus in Louisville. On November 9, 2023, Bellarmine University and Norton Healthcare announced the nation's first fellowship in neurologic physical therapy (PT).

When compared with other healthcare providers in Louisville, Norton Healthcare is the market share leader in five major areas. This includes 46% of all inpatient admissions, 61% of all births, 53% of all emergency department visits, 41% of all outpatient visits, and 50% of total surgeries.

== See also ==
- List of major employers in Louisville, Kentucky
