= John Howard Wallace =

American immunologist and microbiologist

- Born: March 8, 1925; Cincinnati, Ohio, U.S.
- Died: 1992 (aged 66–67)
- Education: Howard University, Ohio State University
- Scientific career
- Workplaces: Harvard University, Tulane University, Ohio State University, University of Louisville
- Thesis: A Serologic Study of Virus Modified Erythrocytes (1953)
- Doctoral advisor: Dr. M.C. Dodd

John Howard Wallace (March 8, 1925 – 1992) was an American immunologist and microbiologist.

== Early life and education ==
Wallace was born in Cincinnati, Ohio on March 8, 1925.

Wallace earned a bachelor's degree in zoology from Howard University in 1947. He earned his master's degree and Ph.D. in bacteriology from Ohio State University in 1948 and 1951, respectively. Wallace's Ph.D. dissertation was titled, "A Serologic Study of Virus Modified Erythrocytes," and his advisor was Dr. M. C. Dodd.

== Career ==
After earning his Ph.D., Wallace worked as a research associate at Harvard Medical School, and subsequently, he was a professor at Tulane University and Ohio State University.

In 1972, Wallace became the first African American to be a chairperson of a department of microbiology in a non-HBCU medical school when he became chair at the University of Louisville.

In 1978, Wallace served as chair of the Minority Affairs Committee of the American Association of Immunologists. Wallace served on the board of governors for the American Academy of Microbiology from 1985 to 1988.

Wallace conducted research related to immune responses to infectious diseases, tobacco smoke, and cancer, and he published over 130 articles in scientific journals.

He died of cancer in 1992.

== Select publications ==
- Chu, N.M., Janckila, A.M., Wallace, J.H., and Yam, L.T., Assessment of a method for immunochemical detection of antigen on nitrocellulose membranes, Journal of Histochemistry & Cytochemistry ,1989, 37(2), pp. 257–263.
- McLeish, K.R., Stelzer, G.T., Wallace, J.H., Regulation of oxygen radical release from murine peritoneal macrophages by pharmacologic doses of PGE2, Free Radical Biology and Medicine, 1987, 3(1), pp. 15–20.
- McLeish, K.R., Gohara, A.F., Stelzer, G.T., Wallace, J.H., Treatment of murine immune complex glomerulonephritis with prostaglandin E2: Dose-response of immune complex deposition, antibody synthesis, and glomerular damage, Clinical Immunology and Immunopathology, 1983, 26(1), pp. 18–23.
- Janckila, A.J., Stelzer, G.T., Wallace, J.H., Yam, L.T., Phenotype of the hairy cells of leukemic reticuloendotheliosis defined by monoclonal antibodies, American Journal of Clinical Pathology, 1983, 79(4), pp. 431–437.
- Janckila, A.J., Wallace, J.H., Yam, L.T., Generalized Monocyte Deficiency in Leukaemic Reticuloendotheliosis, Scandinavian Journal of Haematology, 1982, 29(2), pp. 153–160.
- Parker, M.A., Mandel, A.D., Wallace, J.H., Sonnenfeld, G., Modulation of the human in vitro antibody response by human leukocyte interferon preparations, Cellular Immunology, 1981, 58(2), pp. 464–469.
- Jacob, C.V., Stelzer, G.T., Wallace, J.H., The influence of cigarette tobacco smoke products on the immune response, Immunology, 1980, 40(4), pp. 621–627.
- Poskitt, P.K.F., Poskitt, T.R., Wallace, J.H., Renal deposition of soluble immune complexes in mice bearing B-16 melanoma: Characterization of complexes and relationship to tumor progress, Journal of Experimental Medicine, 1974, 140(2), pp. 410–425
