= Cornelis Bronsgeest =

Dutch bass-baritone

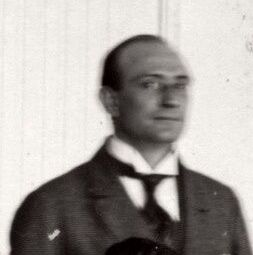
Cornelis Bronsgeest in 1922

Cornelis Bronsgeest (24 July 1878 in Leiden - 22 September 1957 in Berlin) was a Dutch bass-baritone who made his career in Germany. Born to an old bourgeoisie catholic family from Leiden cultivating arts and after discovering his musical talent, Bronsgeest decided to give up career as an architect and became an opera singer, touring internationally. Bronsgeest is linked to the beginnings of radio at the beginning of the 20th century. He founded two major institutions, the Berliner Rundfunk Orchester (now the Rundfunk-SinfonieOrchester Berlin) and the Berliner Rundfunck Chor (now the Rundfunkchor Berlin).He directed the opera department at Berlin radio and was a stage manager with Berliner Theater der Jugend.

== Career ==
Cornelis Bronsgeest completed his musical studies in Germany under the supervision of Pr. Julius Stockhausen in Frankfurt and Richard Schulz-Dornburg in Berlin. Bronsgeest debuted in Magdeburg in 1900. In 1906, he joined the Berlin Opera (HofOper Berlin, and then StaatsOper Berlin) where he became the first Bass-Baritone of the HofOper Berlin. He performed as a special guest of the major European Opera Houses in the Netherlands, Austria, the UK, Belgium and France with a repertoire including Richard Wagner, Wolfgang Mozart, German contemporary musicians such as Richard Strauss and the Italian repertoire. In 1914, he performed in London under Sir Thomas Beecham. In 1919 and 1920 he toured the US. He appeared at the Bayreuth Festival, as a famous Wagner performer.

Bronsgeest is linked to the beginnings of radio at the beginning of the 20th century. He founded two major institutions, the Berliner Rundfunk Orchester (now the Rundfunk-SinfonieOrchester Berlin) and the Berliner Rundfunk Chor (now the Rundfunkchor Berlin). From 1924 to 1933, Bronsgeest was the Director of the Opera department of Berlin Radio. He created the concept of "ton meister" or "sound engineer" to provide the best possible audio quality. Radio opera performances were adapted by Bronsgeest to suit broadcasting requirements.

Concurrently, Bronsgeest founded in 1922 Deutsche Gast–Opera in the Netherlands, spending two years commuting between Berlin and The Hague. He led this flying Opera Society, staging singers including Anton Sistermans, Gemma Bellincioni, Emmy Bettendorf, Leo Schutzendorf, Frida Leider and Louis Morrison.

In 1933, Bronsgeest was forced by the Nazi regime to give up his position at Berlin Radio. However he continued to perform and direct the Berliner Theater der Jugend from 1935 to 1944. He provided opera performances with a small Opera troupe for German soldiers during World War II. He directed Berlin's first postwar Opera performance on August 12, 1945 (Rossini’s Barber of Seville), singing the Role of Count Almaviva. The performance was staged as a chamber opera and performed before a full house, with representatives from the American military government, Critic Christian Wrickert wrote, "the attempt was an adventure, but the success justified Bronsgeest."

== Personal life ==
He married Charlotte Margarete Kant (1888–1965) in 1912, a German post-impressionist painter, who eased him access to the Berlin and German intelligentsia. She was the niece of Themistocles Gluck (1853-1942 in Berlin) the German physician and surgeon and major contributor to the history of Orthopaedics science and the sister of two famous German neuropsychiatrists, Otto Kant (Contributor to the Vienna Circle, Zur Biologie der Ethik, 1932 ) and Fritz Kant who have emigrated to the US in 1933. Their two children, Dietrich-Cornelis Bronsgeest and Esther Hardeland-Bronsgeest lived respectively in France and in Germany.

== Legacy ==
His legacy, biography and memoirs are curated by his son Dietrich-Cornelis Bronsgeest and descendants. He was remembered in articles of German Radio Revue in 1957 and 1958 that celebrated several anniversaries including the 1924 Radio Premiere, and other events or exhibitions organised by the Berlin StaatsOper or the Rundfunk Berlin.
