= Norton Children's Hospital =

Coordinates: 38°14′54.4″N 85°44′59.0″W

- Norton Healthcare

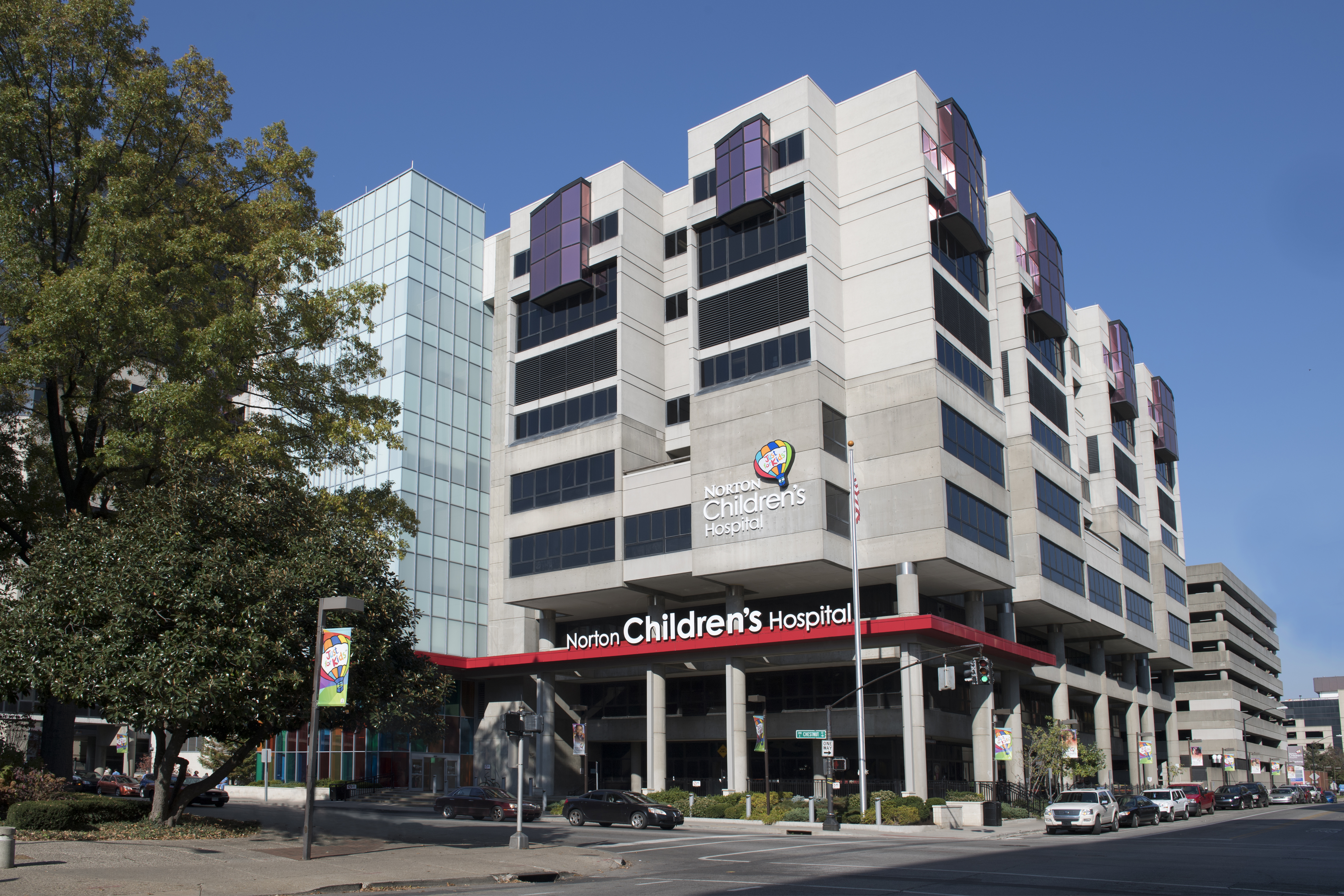
- Norton Children's Hospital exterior, November 2016

Geography
- Location: 231 E Chestnut St, Louisville, Kentucky

Organisation
- Type: Children's Hospital
- Affiliated university: University of Louisville School of Medicine
- Network: Norton Healthcare

Services
- Emergency department: Level 1 Pediatric Trauma Center
- Beds: 300

Helipads
- Helipad: FAA LID: 9KT0

History
- Founded: 1892

Links
- Website: https://nortonchildrens.com/

Norton Children's Hospital, formerly Kosair Children's Hospital, for the Kosair Charities, is a pediatric acute care children's hospital located in Louisville, Kentucky and affiliated with the University of Louisville School of Medicine. The hospital has 300 pediatric beds, providing comprehensive pediatric specialties and subspecialties to infants, children, teens, young adults, age 0-21 throughout Kentucky and the surrounding states. Established in 1892 as Children's Free Hospital, it is part of Norton Healthcare. Norton Children's Hospital also features the region's only Level 1 Pediatric Trauma Center and Level IV Neonatal Intensive Care Unit. In 2016, actress Jennifer Lawrence, a Louisville native, donated $2 million to the Norton Children's Hospital in Louisville to set up a cardiac intensive care unit (CICU) named after her foundation.

== History ==
After a devastating tornado hit Louisville, activists decided to create a place where kids could receive specialized care. The hospital first incorporated in 1890 as Children's Free Hospital. In 1892, the Children's Free Hospital officially opened, becoming the #10 children's hospital to open in the United States. In 1910 a new $60,000, 75-bed hospital was opened to take the place of the original building. In 1930, Children's Free Hospital affiliated with the University of Louisville School of Medicine. In 1946, Children's Free Hospital renamed their hospital to Children's Hospital. In 1986 the modern day hospital opened at current location on East Chestnut Street. In 1988 the regions first pediatric trauma center opened in the hospital. In 2016 The Kosair Children's Hospital rebranded as Norton Children's Hospital.

== Awards ==
In 2014 Norton Children's Hospital ranked among the top 50 children's hospitals in the country and nationally ranked in six categories including #21 in cancer care, #24 in orthopedics, #24 in pulmonology, #29 in neurology and neurosurgery, #31 in urology, #40 in cardiology and heart surgery, and #51 in nephrology.

In 2025-2026 Norton Children's Hospital ranked nationally in 8 specialties by the U.S. News & World Report.

U.S. News & World Report Rankings for 2025–2026
Specialty	Rank (In the U.S.)
Pediatric Urology	#43
Pediatric Pulmonology & Lung Surgery	#35
Pediatric Orthopedics	#26
Pediatric Neurology & Neurosurgery	#44
Pediatric Diabetes & Endocrinology	#18
Pediatric Cardiology & Heart Surgery	#42
Pediatric Cancer	#32
Pediatric Adolescent & Behavioral Health	Top 50

== See also ==
- Jennifer Lawrence
- Norton Healthcare
- List of children's hospitals in the United States
