= Liesel Schuch-Ganzel =

German coloratura soprano

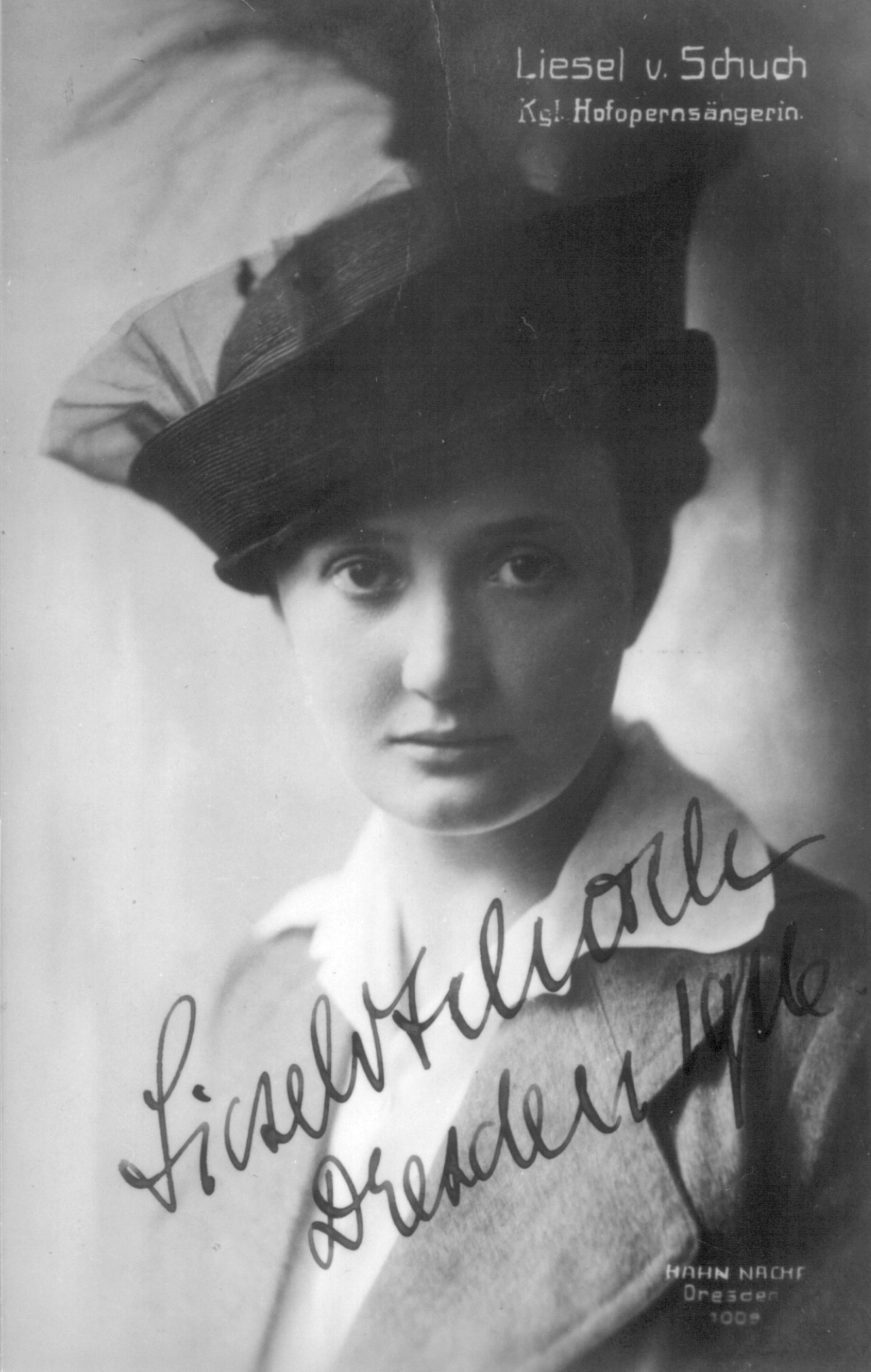
Liesel Schuch-Ganzel

Elisabeth Franziska von Schuch-Ganzel (12 December 1891 – 10 January 1990) also Liesel von Schuch, Liesel Schuch-Ganzel, née von Schuch) was a German coloratura soprano

== Life ==
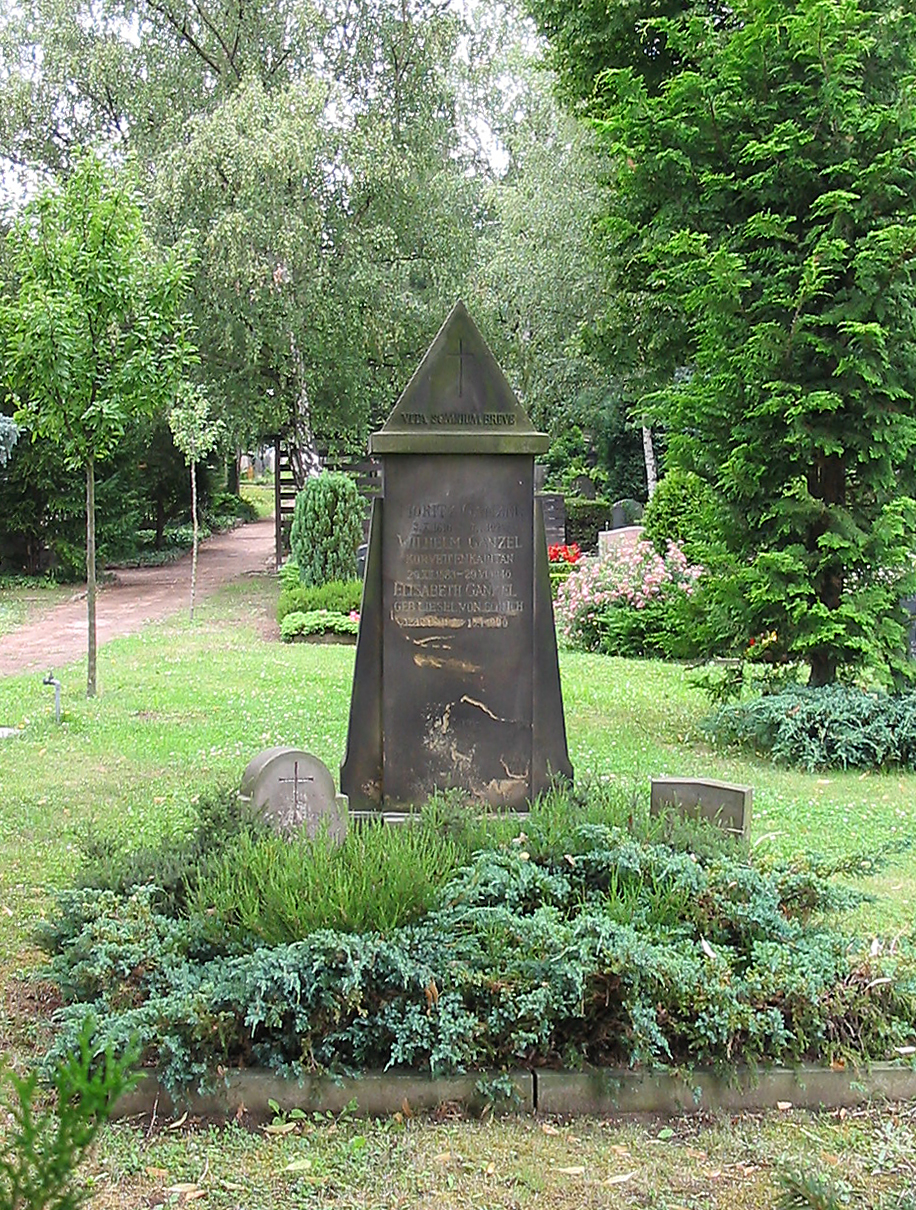
Grave of Elisabeth Ganzel (Liesel von Schuch) at the Friedhof Radebeul-West

Born in Dresden, Schuch grew up with her parents, the conductor Ernst von Schuch and the opera singer Clementine von Schuch-Proska, in Niederlößnitz (today a district of Radebeul). She was a sister of the soprano Käthe von Schuch-Schmidt and the violoncellist Hans von Schuch.

She made her debut in La traviata as Violetta in Wiesbaden in 1913. A coloratura soprano like her mother, she became a Royal Saxon Court Opera Singer, later a Dresden Kammersängerin, and was a permanent member of the Sächsische Staatsoper until 1935. Until 1967, she worked as a teacher of singing at the Hochschule für Musik Carl Maria von Weber Dresden.

She performed in Dresden and Vienna, and in Dresden she gave solo performances in the Dresden Frauenkirche, the Kreuzkirche and the Dresden Cathedral.

In 1988, on the occasion of her 97th birthday, she was made an honorary citizen of Dresden.

She was married to the Corvette Captain Wilhelm Ganzel. Together they had one son (Christian Schuch-Ganzel).

Schuch-Ganzel died in Dresden at the age of 98. She was buried at the Cemetery Radebeul-West near her parents.
