= Ernst von Schuch =

Austrian conductor

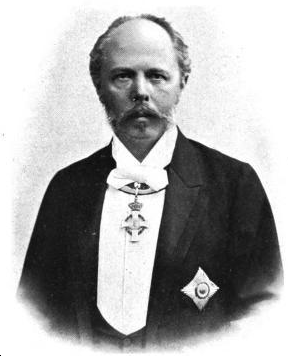
Ernst von Schuch

Ernst Edler von Schuch (born Ernst Gottfried Schuch; 23 November 1846 – 10 May 1914) was an Austrian conductor. He became famous through his working collaborations with Richard Strauss at the Dresden Court Opera.

== Biography ==
Schuch was born on 23 November 1846 in Graz. He first studied law but then turned to music, trained at first by E. Stolz. He studied in Graz and later in Vienna, briefly with Felix Otto Dessoff, and started his conducting career in 1867 as Kapellmeister at Lobe's Theatre in Breslau while the Breslau Opera was out of action following a fire.

Coincidentally, a father and son with the same family name Schuch had built and run the first opera theatre in Breslau 120 years earlier:

There followed engagements in Würzburg (1868–1870), Graz (1870/1871) and Basel, until he was employed in 1872 by Pollini's Italian Opera for Dresden. There in 1872 he became music director at the Court Opera, from 1873 Royal Kapellmeister with Julius Rietz, later with Franz Wüllner. In 1878, he was appointed Royal Professor. In 1882 he undertook the direction of the Court Opera with the title of privy councillor, and in 1889 became its general music director. From 1882 onward, he lived in Niederlößnitz (today part of Radebeul) in the Weintraubenstraße (in 1883 renamed at his own suggestion as Schuchstraße 15/17). In 1898, he was ennobled by the Austrian emperor and in 1899 was appointed to the Saxon Confidential Privy Council. His period of influence is known as the Schuch era in operatic performing history.

Tours as guest conductor in Berlin, Munich, Vienna and Paris aside, he remained committed to Dresden until 1914, and made its opera house there into one of the leading musical stages of Europe. He created a surpassing ensemble and enlarged the orchestra to make it one of the greatest in the world. Specializing in the music-dramas of Wagner, he also led the original productions of the Richard Strauss operas Feuersnot (1901), Salome (1905), Elektra (1909) and Der Rosenkavalier (1911) as well as the first German productions of operas by Puccini and Mascagni, and the Dresden première of Wagner's Parsifal on 24 March 1914, his last new production before his death on 10 May. He died in Niederlößnitz. Also highly valued as a nonoperatic conductor, he was particularly known in the concert hall for his renditions of the orchestral works of Felix Draeseke and Strauss.

He married coloratura soprano Clementine von Schuch-Proska (Klementine Procházka) (1850–1932), who became an honorary member of Dresden's Royal Theatre Company. Their daughter Liesel von Schuch sang in Dresden (from 1914 on) and Vienna.

== Literature ==
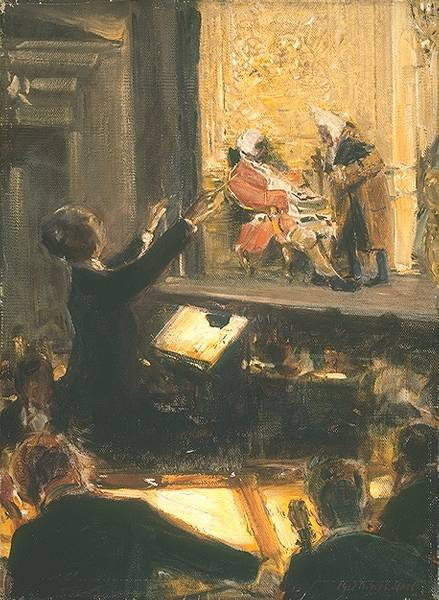
Ernst Edler von Schuch conducting Der Rosenkavalier by Richard Strauss, 1912. Oil painting by Robert Sterl, (Old National Gallery, Berlin)

- A. Eaglefield-Hull, A Dictionary of Modern Music and Musicians (Dent, London 1924)
- P. Sakolowsky, E. Schuch (1901).
- Gerhard M. Dienes (Ed.), „mit mir...“ Ernst von Schuch (1846–1914). Ein Grazer als Generalmusikdirektor in Dresden. Exhibition Catalogue 1999. (Graz City Museum, Graz 1999), ISBN 3-900764-20-4
- E. Krause, "Richard Strauss, Ernst von Schuch und Dresden." In: Blätter der Staatstheater Dresden, 1963/64
- Richard Strauss/Ernst von Schuch: Richard Strauss - Ernst von Schuch. Ein Briefwechsel (An exchange of letters). Edited by Gabriella Hanke Knaus. (= Veröffentlichungen der Richard-Strauss-Gesellschaft (Offerings of the Richard Strauss Society); Band 16). (Henschel-Verlag, Berlin 1999). ISBN 3-89487-329-9
- Große Kreisstadt Radebeul (Ed.), Stadtlexikon Radebeul (Historisches Handbuch für die Lößnitz, 2005). ISBN 3-938460-05-9
