= Anton Karg Haus =

Alpine club hut in the Austrian state of Tyrol

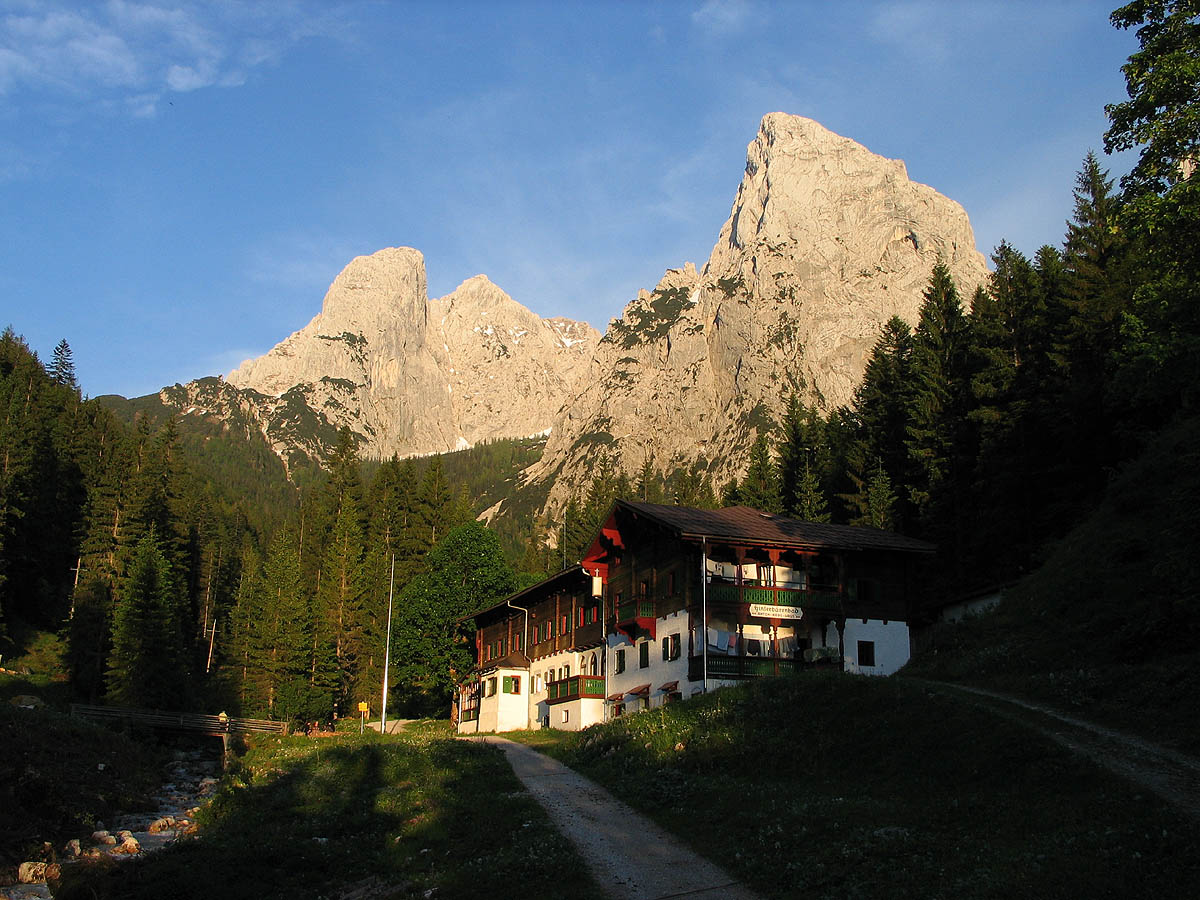
- Hinterbärenbad and the Anton Karg Haus
- Interactive map of the Anton Karg Haus area

General information
- Location: Hinterbärenbad in the Kaisertal valley
- Coordinates: 47.58°N 12.27722°E
- Elevation: 829 m (2,720 ft)
- Owner: Austrian Alpine Club (ÖAV) - Kufstein Section

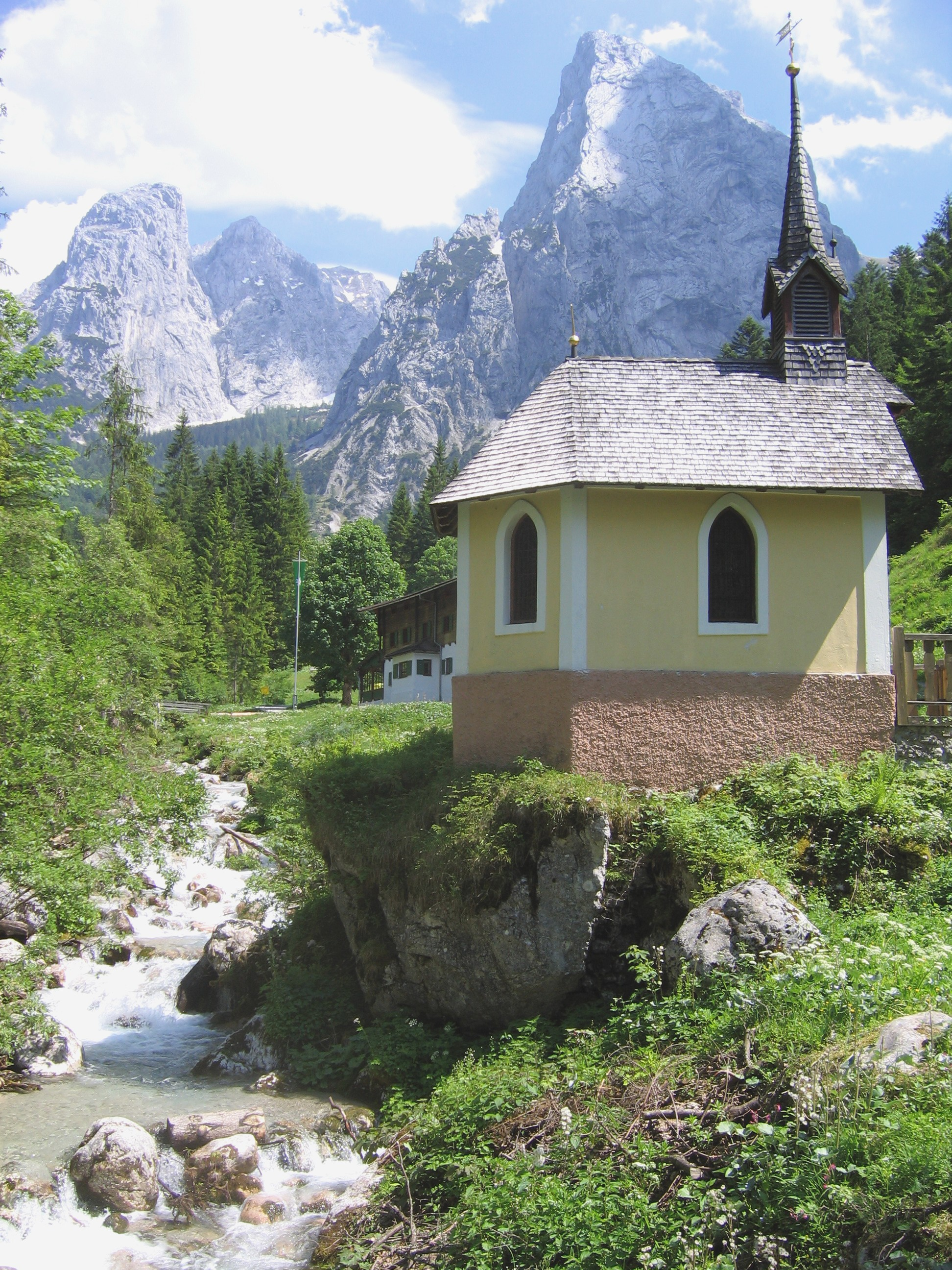
Hinterbärenbad

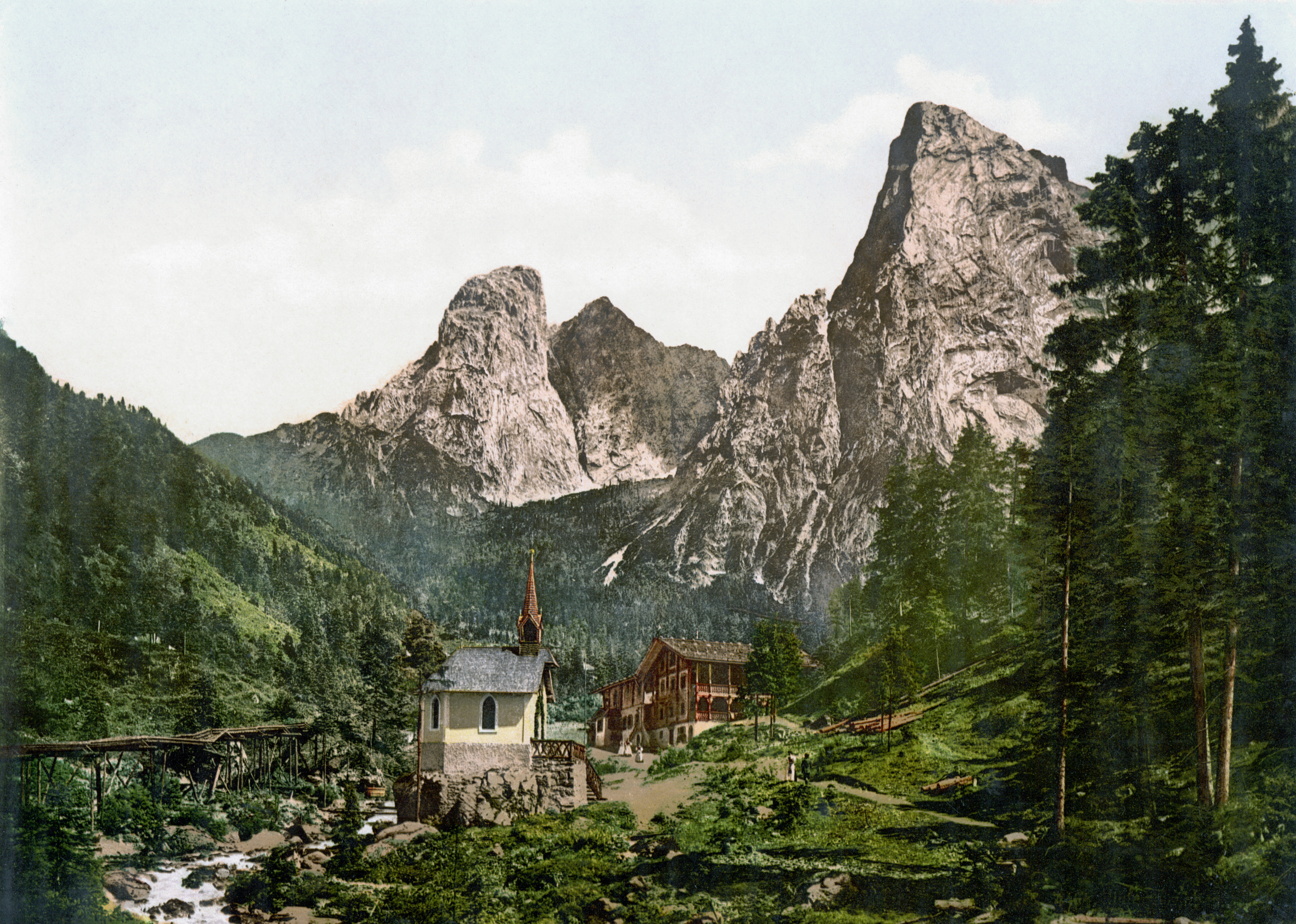
Hinterbärenbad around 1900

The Anton Karg Haus, formerly the Neue Hinterbärenbad Hut, is an Alpine club hut belonging to the Kufstein Section of the Austrian Alpine Club in the Kaisergebirge mountains in the Austrian state of Tyrol. The hut is named after the co-founder of the Kufstein Section, Anton Karg, who was the manager of the hut from 1888 and, from 1890 to 1919, the chairman of the Kufstein Branch of the Alpine Club.

== Location ==
The Anton Karg Haus lies in the upper region of the Kaisertal valley at a spot where the Kaiserbach stream is known as the Hinterbärenbad (see below). The house is located in quiet, spectacular surroundings with a view of both the Wilder Kaiser and the Zahmer Kaiser in the middle of the Wilder Kaiser nature reserve. It is easy to reach even for day trippers and so is a popular destination, especially in fine weather.

The path to the hut is considered particularly scenic, as the light-coloured limestone rocks of the Kaisergebirge open up increasingly as it progresses, and hiker literally walk into the mountains. Although the Kaisergebirge are not all that high for the Alps, this route is particularly impressive because of the height difference of 1,200 metres (3,900 ft) between the level of the path and the surrounding peaks.

== History ==
The Anton Karg Haus has a long tradition. In 1882 the borough of Kufstein lent the Kufstein Branch an alpine hut which, after remodelling, was opened as the Hinterbärenbad Hut on 25 July 1883. After a further expansion in 1884 the house, together with a second, newly built wooden building, was transferred to the full ownership of the Kufstein Branch. After the construction of a veranda and the conversion of the second building into sleeping accommodation the Hinterbärenbad Refuge House was open for guests from 1887. In 1894 this led to its enlargement as well as a partial new build. In the winter months of 1894/95 the New Hinterbärenbad Hut was built, which opened in spring 1895. The unusually spacious rooms, some equipped with balconies, date to this period. In 19th century and beginning of the 20th century it was a summer retreat for respected townsfolk in Kufstein. The unusually spacious rooms for a mountain hut, some even with a private balcony, date from that period. For many years, the house was hosted by the Pavicic family (the tenants changed in 2006).

=== Hinterbärenbad ===
The Anton Karg Haus lies at a particularly beautiful point on the Kaiserbach stream, the Hinterbärenbad. According to oral tradition brown bears, formerly widespread in the entire Alpine region, used to cool themselves here on hot summer days by taking a bath. It is also possible that the bears were looking for food and that it just appeared as if they were bathing in the Kaiserbach.

In the 19th century the bears were exterminated by Alpine residents out of fear, and especially of their perceived threat to their cattle. There have been attempts, however, to reintroduce bears to the Austrian Alps. Of the former presence of bears, only old drawings and paintings remain.

== Access ==
- By car on the Inn Valley Motorway (Inntal-Autobahn), numbered the A12 in Austria and A93 in Germany, to the Kufstein Nord exit and then to the car park in Kufstein-Spatchen near the entrance to the Kaisertal.
- By train to Kufstein station and then on foot in 20 minutes to the start of the climbing trail into the Kaisertal.

== Approaches ==
- From Kufstein/Sparchen through the Kaisertal valley on the normal route via Pfandlhof and the track (an easy walk), alternatively on the old Kaisertal Way via St. Anthony’s Chapel (Antoniuskapelle) and the upper way on the mountainside, duration both 2.5 hours.
- From the Griesner Alm (toll road) in the Kaiserbach valley by crossing the Stripsenjoch (normale mountain trail, 600 metre ascent and 750 metre descent), duration: 3 hours.
- By chair lift to the Brentenjoch. After a short walk the Kaindl Hut is reached, the path runs from there over the Bettlersteig trail descending most of the way to the Anton Karg Haus, medium difficulty, duration from Brentenjoch 3 hours.

== Crossings ==
- Kaindl Hut (1,318 m) over the Bettlersteig climbing trail, medium difficulty, duration: 2 hours
- Vorderkaiserfelden Hut (1,388 m), easy, duration: 2½ hours
- Hans Berger Haus (940 m), easy, duration: 15 minutes
- Stripsenjochhaus (1,580 m), easy, duration: 2 hours
- Grutten Hut (1,620 m) via Hohen Winkel and Kopftörl, difficult, duration: 5 hours

== Ascents ==
- Kleiner Halt (2,116 m), difficult, duration: 2½ hours
- Ellmauer Halt (2,344 m) via Kaiserschützensteig climbing trail, difficult, duration: 5½ hours
- Sonneck (2,260 m) via Güttlersteig climbing trail, medium difficulty, duration: 4 hours
- Pyramidenspitze (1,998 m) or Vordere Kesselschneid (2,002 m), easy, duration: 3 hours
- Stripsenkopf (1,807 m) via the Stripsenjoch, easy, duration: 2½ hours
- Numerous climbing tours on the Kleiner Halt/Gamshalt from 3+
