= Hans Berger Haus =

Refuge hut in the Kaisergebirge mountains in Tyrol

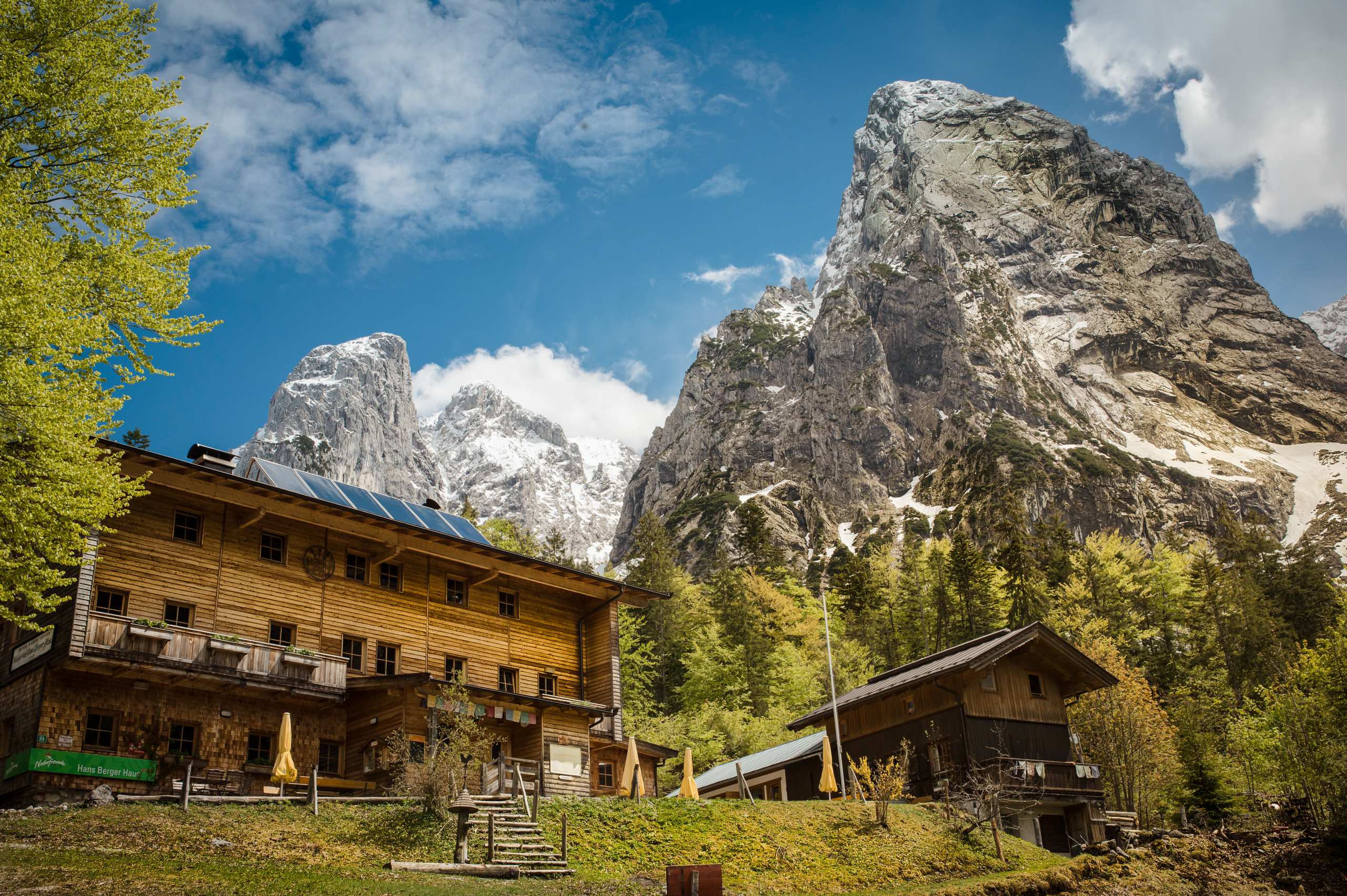
- Interactive map of the Hans Berger Haus area

General information
- Location: at the foot of the Totenkirchl, Karlspitzen and Ellmauer Halt
- Coordinates: 47.57806°N 12.28528°E
- Elevation: 940 m (3,080 ft)
- Owner: TVN - Kufstein branch

The Hans Berger Haus is a refuge hut belonging to the Kufstein section of the Austrian Friends of Nature, located in the Kaisergebirge mountains in Tyrol. The tenants run a well-known climbing school here.

== Location ==
The hut is located at a height of 940 metres (3,080 ft) at the top of the Kaisertal valley at the foot of the Totenkirchl, Karlspitzen and Ellmauer Halt mountains. The backdrop of these massive, rocky peaks is unmistakable. The Hans Berger Haus is a popular destination for hikers and an important base for mountaineers and climbers who set off from here for longer tours in the Wilder Kaiser. Only 15 minutes away is the Anton Karg Haus belonging to the Austrian Alpine Club.

== History ==
On 13 March 1911, the Kufstein branch of the Friends of Nature was founded. Their efforts to own a refuge hut belonging to the association were successful twenty years later when, on 30 July 1931, the municipality of Kufstein accepted the application for a building plot.

The refuge was officially opened on 17 July 1933 as the Kaiser Valley Hut (Kaisertalhütte); on 2 October 1933, a celebration was held to mark the "completed extension". At the same time, the decision to build a "big lodging house" had already been made.

In 1940, the Kaiser Valley Hut was sold by the Reich Association of German Youth Hostels to the German Alpine Club (Deutscher Alpenverein or DAV). Hermann Bühler began building a new DAV library here at the end of the Second World War after most of the previous one had fallen victim to the war.

After a major expansion in 1956, the Kaiser Valley Hut was renamed the Hans Berger House in honour of the long-standing branch chairman. Since 1968 it has been the seat of the Wilder Kaiser mountaineering school. The house was completely rebuilt and modernized again in 2009.

== Approaches ==
The Hut Way (Hüttenweg), a 450-metre climb, begins in Kufstein-Sparchen and runs the length of the Kaisertal past Veitenhof, Pfandlhof, St. Anthony's Chapel (Antoniuskapelle) and the Anton Karg Haus without posing any difficulties, taking about 2½ hours to reach Hans Berger Haus.

Another option is the ascent from the Griesenau Alm in the Kaiserbach valley. But this requires ascending 600 metres to the Stripsenjochhaus, then a good 600 metres again down to the Hans Berger Haus; duration: 3 hours.

== Crossings ==
- Anton Karg Haus (829 m), duration: 15 minutes
- Kaindl Hut (1.318 m), via the Bettlersteig, medium difficulty, duration: 2½ hours
- Vorderkaiserfelden Hut (1.388 m), via the Hechleitalm, easy, duration: 2½ hours
- Stripsenjochhaus (1.577 m), easy, duration: 1½ hours
- Grutten Hut (1.620 m), via the Hohen Winkel und Kopftörl, difficult, duration: 5 hours
- Grutten Hut (1.620 m), via the Scharlinger Boden, Rote-Rinn wind gap, difficult, duration: 5 hours

== Ascents ==
- Ellmauer Halt (2.344 m), over the Kaiserschützensteig (climbing path), duration: 5 hours
- Ellmauer Halt (2.344 m), via the Rote-Rinn wind gap, duration: 4½ hours
- Kleine Halt (2.116 m), over the Kaiserschützensteig, duration: 3 hours
- Gamshalt (2.291 m), over the Kaiserschützensteig, duration: 4 hours
- Totenkirchl (2.190 m), climbing tour
- Stripsenkopf (1.807 m), easy, duration: 2 hours
- Pyramidenspitze (1.998 m), medium difficulty, duration: 3½ hours
- Sonneck (2.260 m), medium difficulty, duration: 4 hours
