= Feldberg =

Feldberg may refer to:

== Places ==
- Feldberg, Baden-Württemberg, a municipality and village, Germany
- Feldberg, a village and part of Müllheim, Baden-Württemberg, Germany
- Feldberg, a village and part of Feldberger Seenlandschaft, Mecklenburg-Vorpommern, Germany
- Feldberg, a settlement and part of Ebbs, Austria

== Mountains and hills ==
- Feldberg (Kaiser) (1,813 m), a mountain in the Kaiser Mountains, Tyrol, Austria
- Feldberg (Black Forest) (1,493 m), the highest mountain in the Black Forest of Germany
  - Feldberg Pass
- Großer Feldberg (879 m), highest mountain of the Taunus, Hesse, Germany
- Kleiner Feldberg (826 m), second highest mountain of the Taunus, Hesse, Germany
- Feldberg (Hessian Rhön) (815.2 m), a mountain in Hesse, Germany
- Feldberg (Bavarian Rhön) (570.2 m), a hill in Bavaria, Germany
- Feldberg (Olpe) (556.2 m), hill in the county of Olpe, North Rhine-Westphalia, Germany

== Surname ==
- David Feldberg (born 1977), American professional disc golfer
- Girts Feldbergs (born 1993), Latvian swimmer
- Meyer Feldberg (born 1942), dean of Columbia Business School from 1989 to 2004
- Ojārs Arvīds Feldbergs (born 1947), Latvian sculptor
- Wilhelm Feldberg (1900–1993), German-British-Jewish physiologist and biologist

== Other uses ==
- 10666 Feldberg, an asteroid
- Feldberg (band), an Icelandic band
- Feldberg Foundation, an Anglo-German scientific exchange
