= Feldberg (Kaiser) =

Mountain in Tyrol, Austria

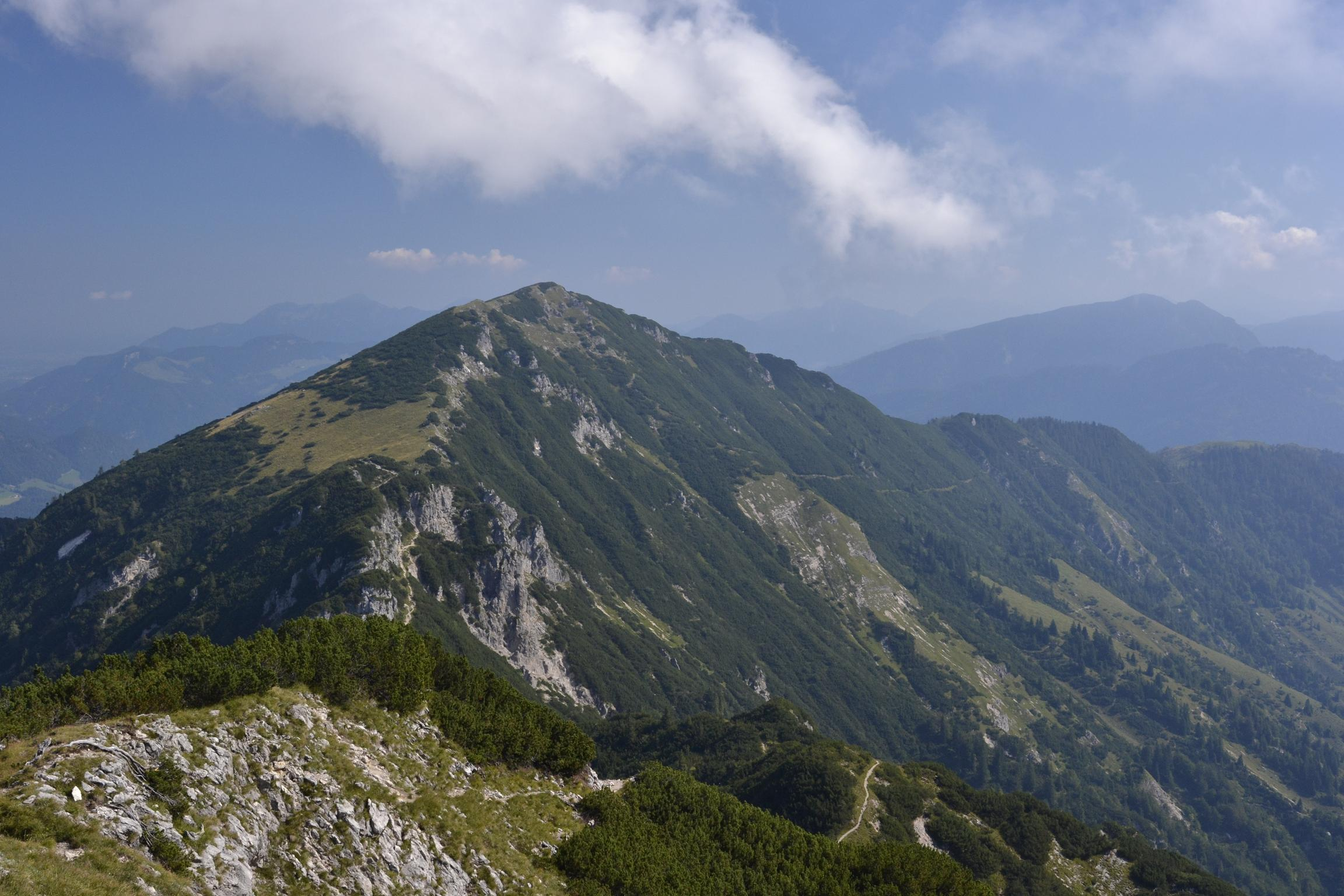
- The Feldberg seen from the Stripsenkopf

Highest point
- Elevation: 1,813 m (AA) (5,948 ft)
- Prominence: 1,813-1,577 m ↓ Stripsenjoch
- Isolation: 2.3 km → Fleischbank
- Coordinates: 47°35′33″N 12°19′28″E

Geography
- Location within Austria
- Location: Tyrol, Austria
- Parent range: Kaiser Mountains

Climbing
- Normal route: waymarked mountain path from Griesenau or via the Stripsenjochhaus

The Feldberg (German pronunciation: [ˈfɛltˌbɛʁk]) is a mountain, 1,813 m (AA), in the Kaiser range in the Austrian state of Tyrol.

Its summit may be ascended on an easy mountain path either directly from Griesenau or via the Stripsenjochhaus hut and the Stripsenkopf.
