= Stripsenkopf =

Mountain in Austria

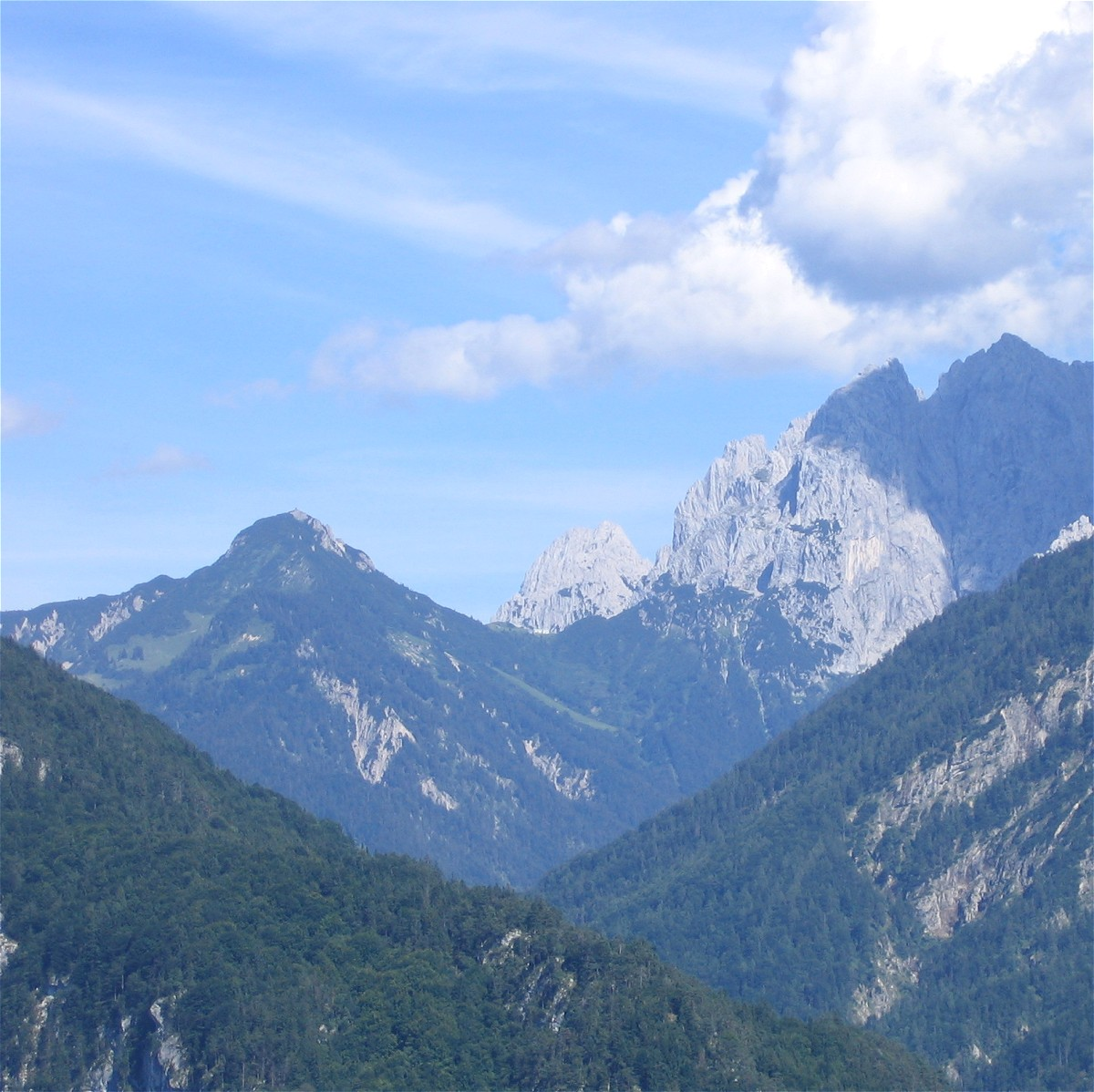
- The Stripsenkopf (left) seen from the Thierberg

Highest point
- Elevation: 1,807 m (AA) (5,928 ft)
- Coordinates: 47°N 12°E

Geography
- Location within Austria
- Location: Tyrol, Austria
- Parent range: Kaisergebirge

Climbing
- Easiest route: Stripsenjochhaus-Stripsenkopf

The Stripsenkopf is a 1,807-metre-high (5,928 ft) mountain in the Kaisergebirge range of the Northern Limestone Alps in Austria. It belongs to the Zahmer Kaiser group and its summit is covered in mountain pine.

== Location ==
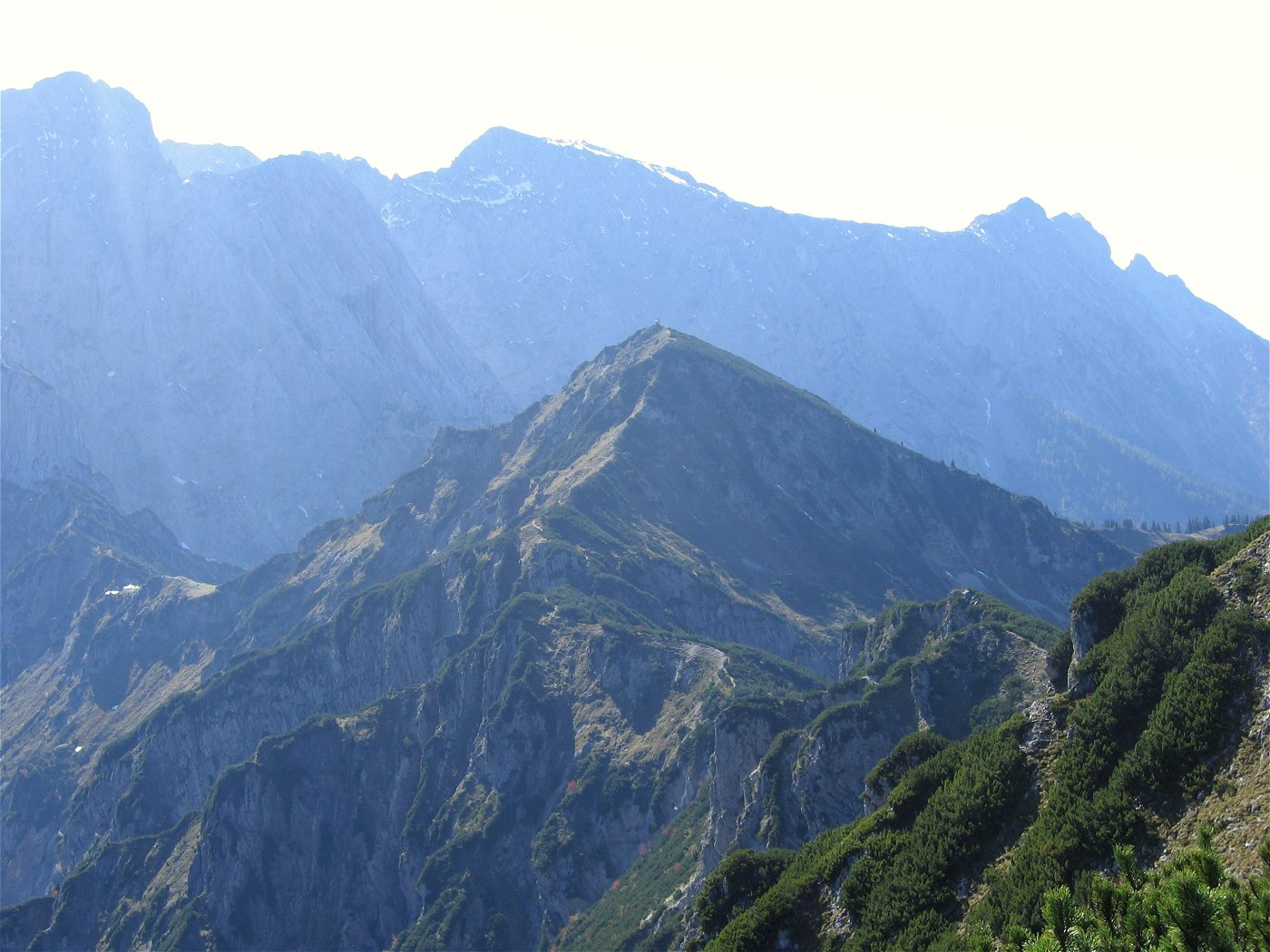
The Stripsenkopf. Behind: the Sonneck

The Stripsenkopf rises immediately north of the Stripsenjoch saddle, which separates the peak from the Wilder Kaiser. Its unique location makes the Stripsenkopf a very popular destination with its commanding view of the rock faces on the Karlspitzen and Totenkirchl. From the Stripsenkopf a wide ridge runs northeast over to the Feldberg (1,814 m), a frequently used climbing path heading along it toward Griesenau. On the west side the Stripsenkopf falls away into the Kaisertal valley, its slopes covered in mountain pine and woods. To the southeast its steep flanks and gullies drop into the Kaiserbach valley.

== Routes ==
Numerous signposted routes lead to the Stripsenkopf. As a rule they do not pose any problems and are therefore very frequently used. The normal route begins at the Griesner Alm (1,000 m) and leads via the Stripsenjochhaus to the summit with its wooden pavilion after about 2.5 hours. Considerably longer is the route from Kufstein via the Anton Karg Haus and the Hans Berger Haus to the Stripsenkopf in about 5 hours. In addition there is a climb from the Kohltal valley near Schwendt over the Tristecken and another route from Griesenau via the Scheibenbühelalm and the neighbouring Feldberg to the Stripsenkopf.
