= Stripsenjochhaus =

Alpine club hut in the Austrian state of Tyrol

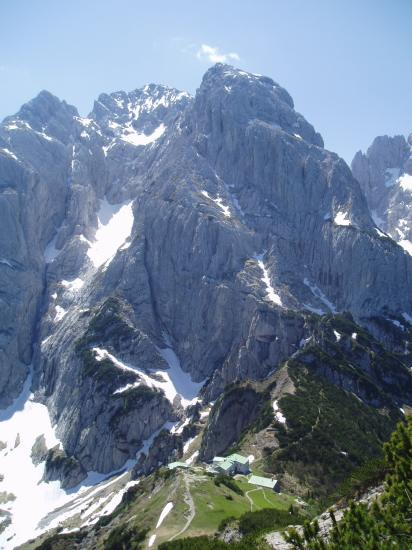
- Interactive map of the Stripsenjochhaus area

General information
- Coordinates: 47.576933°N 12.310583°E
- Elevation: 1,577 m (5,174 ft)
- Owner: OeAV, Kufstein section

Website
- www.stripsenjoch.at

The Stripsenjochhaus is an Alpine club hut owned by the Kufstein branch of the Austrian Alpine Club in the Kaisergebirge mountain range in the Austrian state of Tyrol.

== Location ==
The house lies on the Stripsenjoch which forms a bridge between the ridges of the Zahmer Kaiser and Wilder Kaiser at the head of the Kaiserbachtal and Kaisertal valleys at a height of 1,577 m. The Stripsenjochhaus therefore occupies a very central position and is often referred to as the turntable of the Kaisergebirge.

== Facilities ==
With 100 beds and 60 dormitory places the Stripsenjochhaus is the largest hut in the Kaisergebirge and is fully staffed from mid-May to mid October. Although it is invariably busy in the summer, it is a good place to stay the night. Kev Reynolds's guide, Walking in Austria, describes it thus:

"Given good conditions the alpenglow which flushes the soaring backdrop mountain walls with hues of pink, scarlet and gold, will be among your richest memories."

== History ==
The Stripsenjochhaus is one of the longest-standing Alpine club huts in the Northern Limestone Alps which "for decades, has acted as a base for the most popular and some of the most famous rock climbing mountains in the Alps." The origins of the house date back to planning carried out in 1899 and it was built in 1902 by the Kufstein section of the Austrian Alpine Club. The house was ceremonially opened in the early summer of 1902. Its first tenant to 1925 was Johann Tavonaro. In the 1950s and 60s the house was modified several times, renovated and extended. At that time the supply cableway from the Griesner Alm was built. In 2000 the house was damaged by a room fire and renovated the following year. The Stripsenjochhaus is now managed by the 2nd generation of the Fankhauser family from Ginzling in the Ziller valley.

== Access ==
- By train to Kufstein or St. Johann in Tirol.
- By bus to Kufstein-Sparchen, Griesenau or Hohenkendel.
- By car via the toll road from Griesenau to the Griesener Alm (990 m).

== Approaches ==
- From the Griesener Alm on the Hut Way (Hüttenweg) in ca. 1½ hours
- From Gasthof Hohenkendel near Griesenau via die Kohlalm and the Feldberg in ca. 3 hours.
- From Kufstein through the Kaisertal valley via Anton Karg Haus and Hans Berger Haus in 4 hours.
- From Walchsee via die Gwirchtalm, Hochalm or Feldalm in 4 hours.

== Crossings ==
- Fritz Pflaum Hut (1,865 m) via the Hut Way (Hüttenweg) and Großes Griesner Tor, medium, duration: 2½ hours
- Gaudeamus Hut (1,270 m) via the Steinerne Rinne, Ellmauer Tor and Kübel cirque (Kübelkar), difficult, duration: 4 hours
- Grutten Hut (1,620 m) via Steinerne Rinne, Ellmauer Tor and Jubiläumssteig, difficult, duration: 4 hours
- Hans Berger Haus or Anton Karg Haus an easy descent, duration: 1½ hours
- Vorderkaiserfelden Hut (1,388 m) via Feldalm saddle, Hochalm, High Way (Höhenweg), medium, duration: 3½ hours

== Ascents ==
As a result of its location in the middle of the "Kaiser" the hut acts as a base for innumerable climbing opportunities at every grade of difficulty. Several important summit destinations include:

- Ellmauer Halt (2,344 m), climbing tour
- Goinger Halt (2,242 m), grade II, duration: 2½ hours
- Pyramidenspitze (1,998 m), duration: 3½ hours
- Ackerlspitze (2,329 m), duration: 4½ hours
- Predigtstuhl, climbing tour
- Totenkirchl, climbing tour
- Fleischbank, climbing tour
- Stripsenkopf (1,813 m), easy, duration: 30-45 min and Feldberg (1 hour)
