= Grutten Hut =

Mountain hut in Austrian Tyrol

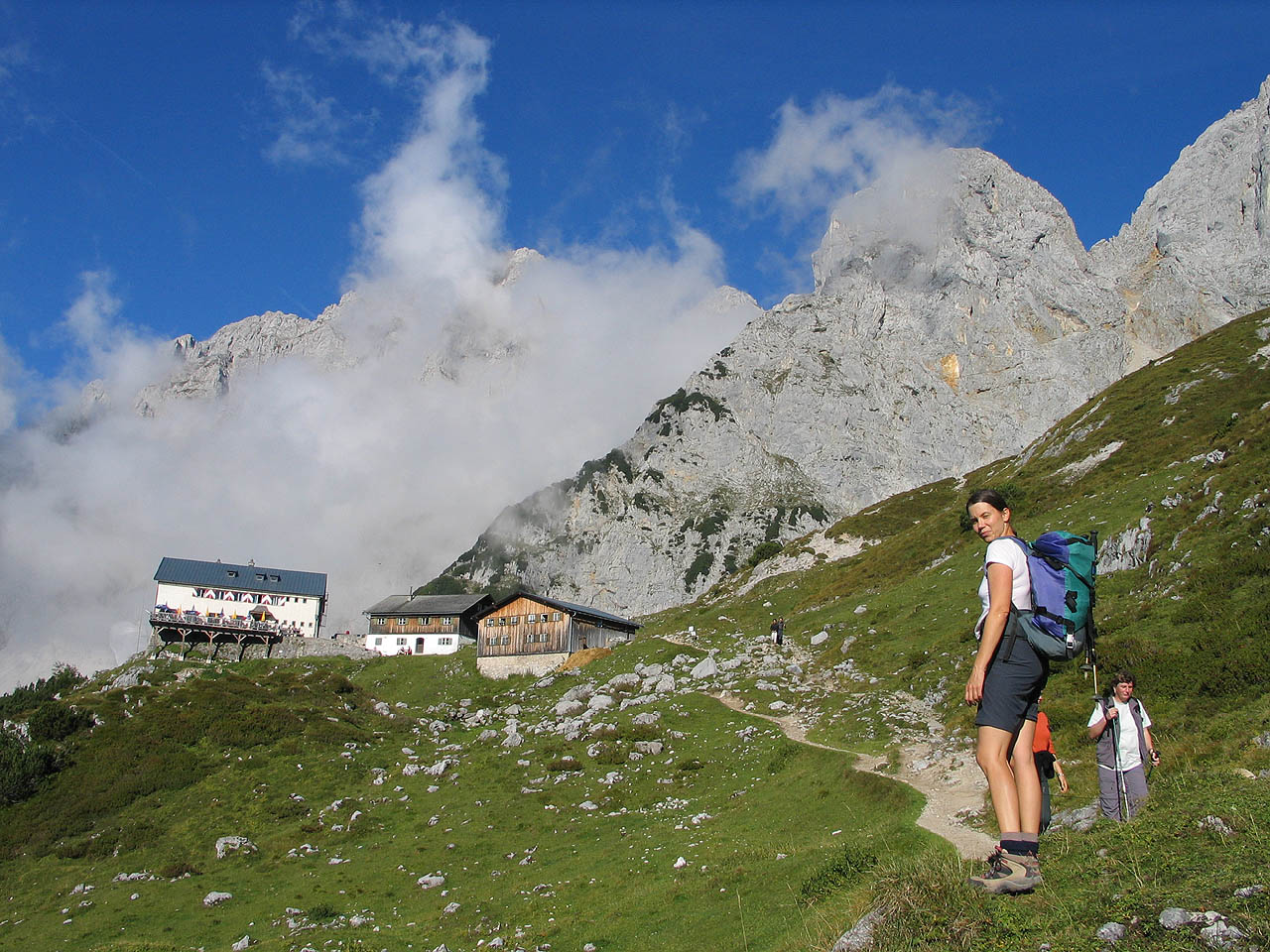
- Interactive map of the Grutten Hut area

General information
- Location: southern side of the Wilder Kaiser
- Coordinates: 47.55333°N 12.31083°E
- Elevation: 1,620 m (5,310 ft)
- Owner: German Alpine Club (DAV) - Turner Alps Kränzchen Section

Website
- www.grutten-huette.at

The Grutten Hut (German: Gruttenhütte) is an Alpine club hut situated at a height of 1620 metres in the Kaisergebirge in Tyrol, Austria. It is owned by the Turner Alps Kränzchen Section of the German Alpine Club. It is the highest mountain hut in the Kaiser Mountains.

== Location ==
The hut is located on the southern side of the Wilder Kaiser ridge, on a grassy terrace above the villages of Ellmau and Going with a view of Großvenediger. Above this hut is the Ellmauer Halt that, at 2,344 metres (7,690 ft), is the highest mountain in the Kaisergebirge range. In the summer, the Grutten Hut is a destination for hikers and a base for mountaineers and climbers, who use the hut to reach Alpine tours to the summits of the Wilder Kaiser.

== History ==
The Grutten Hut was built in 1899 on its present site by the Alpen Turner Kränzchen Section and Carl Babenstuber and was ceremonially opened on 14 July 1900. Soon afterwards, a glass veranda, a wash house and a mule stable were built. In 1922 a separate sleeping block, the Josef Dorn Haus was built and in 1925 the then manager of the hut, Hans Eisenmann, created a climbing area through the Wilde Gschloß, the present-day Jubiläumssteig. In 1938 there were further modifications and extensions, including another sleeping block, the Emil Kempfle Haus. During the Second World War the Grutten Hut was commandeered, and it remained closed until 1951 after the border opening when there was a great influx into the Tyrol. In the 1960s, further major upgrades and extensions were added. Even after a new well was dug its supply was hardly any greater, and just before its 100th anniversary a costly sewer conduit was built. This not only ensures the supply of water and drainage, but also provides the lodge with electricity and telephone service. In 2002 the sanitary facilities were modernised and a wooden terrace was built.

== Access ==
By car from Kufstein drive through Scheffau to Ellmau. From Salzburg pass through Lofer and St. Johann in Tirol to Ellmau. Then branch north and finally drive along the toll road up to the Wochenbrunner Alm (1,080 m) where there is a large car park.

== Approaches ==
- From Wochenbrunner Alm, take the signposted Hut Trail (Hüttenweg) to reach the hut after about 90 minutes (541 m ascent).
- From Ellmau or Scheffau take the path via the Riedl Hut and the track to the hut, duration 2½ hours (800 m ascent).
- From Going take the route via the Gaudeamus Hut and the Klamml, a steep rocky gully, duration 3 hours (800 m ascent).

== Crossings ==
- Gaudeamus Hut (1,270 m) via the Klamml, medium difficulty, duration: 45 minutes
- Kaindl Hut (1,318 m) along the Wilder Kaiser Trail (Steig), Walleralm and Hochegg, easy, duration: 5 hours
- Hans Berger Haus or Anton Karg Haus via Kopftörl and Hohen Winkel, difficult, duration: 4 hours
- Hans Berger Haus or Anton Karg Haus via the Rote Rinn wind gap and Scharlinger Boden, difficult, duration: 4 hours
- Stripsenjochhaus (1,577 m) along the Jubiläumssteig trail, Ellmauer Tor and Steinerne Rinne couloir, difficult, duration: 3½ hours
- Fritz Pflaum Hut (1,865 m) along the Jubiläumssteig, Gildensteig and Kleines Törl, difficult, duration: 5 hours
- Ackerl Hut (1,460 m) along the Jubiläumssteig and Wilder Kaiser Trail, medium difficulty, duration: 3 hours

== Ascents ==
- Ellmauer Halt (2,344 m), duration: 2½ hours
- Treffauer (2,304 m), duration: 3 hours
- Kleine Halt (2,116 m), duration: 3½ hours
- Karlspitzen (2,281 m), duration: 2½ hours
- Goinger Halt (2,193 m), duration: 2 hours
- Numerous climbing routes, for example on the Kopftörl arête

== Accommodation ==
The hut offers the following accommodation:

- 79 dormitory bedspaces
- 6 double room bedspaces
- 18 mattress bedspaces

There is no winter room.

== Mapping ==
- Alpine Club Map Sheet 8, Kaisergebirge (1:25.000)

== See also ==
- Kaiser Mountains
