= Tischofer Cave =

Cave and archaeological site in Austria

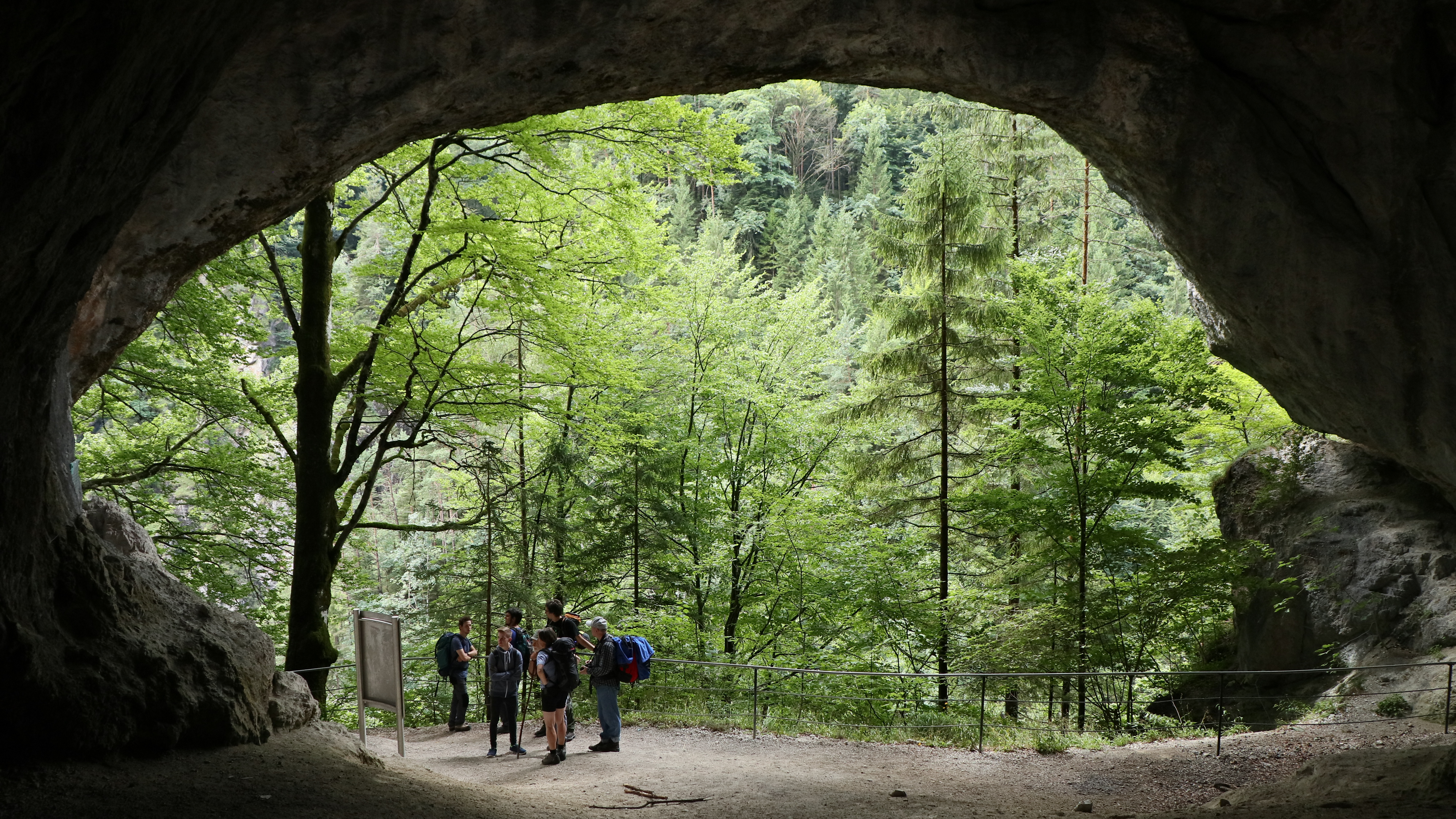
- The Tischofer Cave
- Interactive map of Tischofer Cave
- Location: Kaisertal, Tyrol, Austria
- Coordinates: 47°35′31″N 12°11′48″E
- Length: 40 m (130 ft)

The Tischofer Cave (German: Tischofer Höhle) is a cave in the Kaisertal valley in the Kaisergebirge mountains in Austria. It was a locally important gathering place and weapons cache during the Tyrolean Rebellion in the Napoleonic Wars. The roughly 40 m (130 ft) long cave, which is about 8.5 m (28 ft) high at the entrance, was occupied by cave bears and other predators as shelter during the Paleolithic as evidenced by numerous excavated skeletal remains. Bone tools of paleo-human inhabitants made of cave bear bones and skulls discovered here and dated to about 27,000 - 28,000 years ago may be viewed in the local history museum in the fortress at Kufstein. That dating makes the Tischofer Cave the oldest known uncontested site of human occupation in Tyrol.

Discoveries of more recent human skeletons and associated tools also indicate that the cave served as a copper smithy and foundry during the Bronze Age.

The Tischofer Cave may be reached on foot via the Kaiser Path (Kaiseraufstieg) in the Kaisertal valley, a pathway secured with cable railings. It is recorded in the Tyrolean Cave Register as number 1312/001.
