= Vordere Kesselschneid =

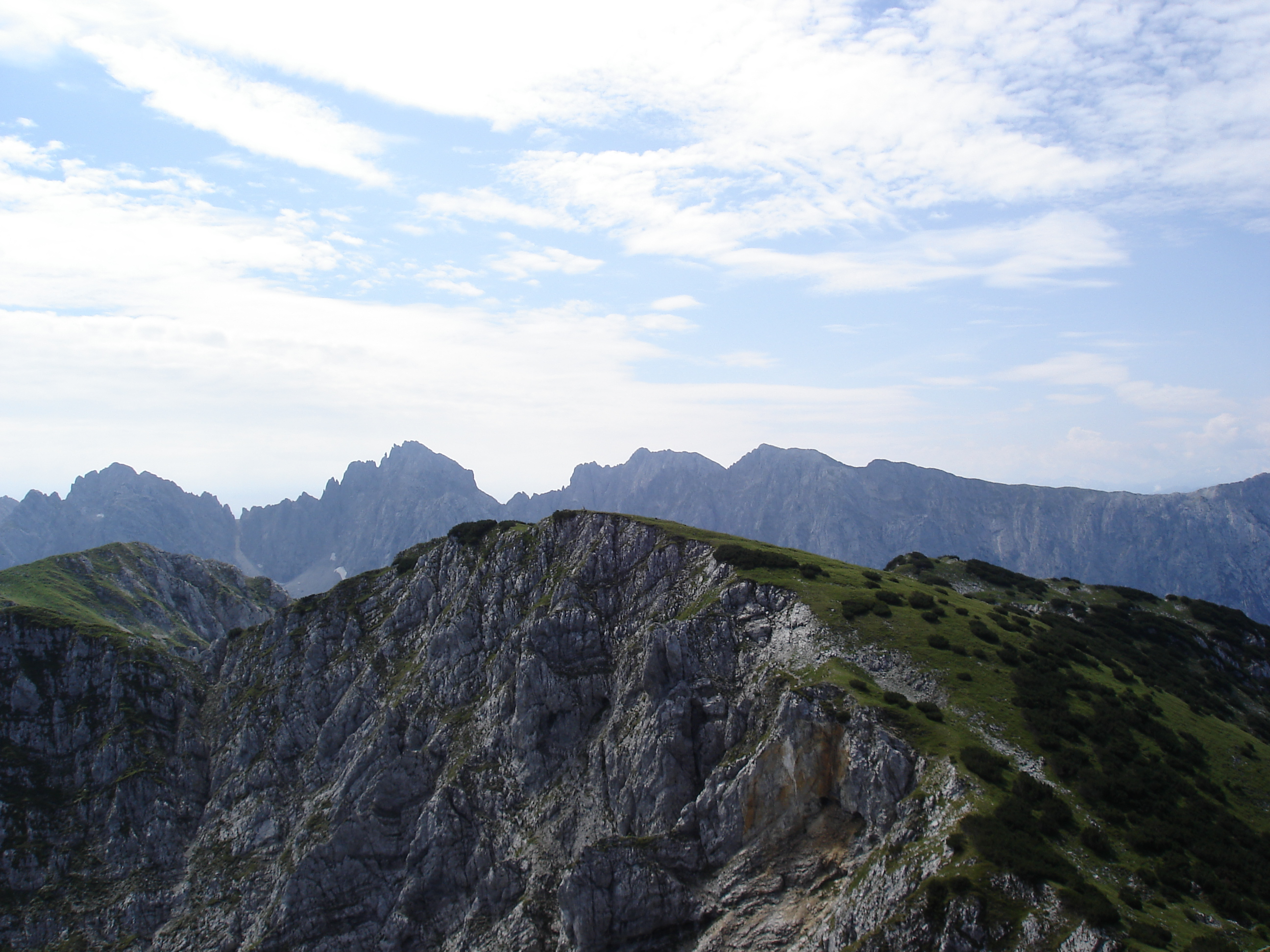
- The Vordere Kesselschneid (in the foreground) from the Pyramidenspitze

Highest point
- Elevation: 2,002 m (6,568 ft)
- Prominence: 603 m (1,978 ft)
- Coordinates: 47°36′37″N 12°16′36″E

Geography
- Location within Alps
- Location: Tyrol, Austria
- Parent range: Kaisergebirge

At 2,002 metres (6,568 ft) the Vordere Kesselschneid is the highest summit in the Zahmer Kaiser, the northern chain of the Kaiser Mountains in the Austrian state of Tyrol.

Its summit is located southeast of the oft-visited Pyramidenspitze and is separated from it by a ca. 50 m deep saddle. To the east of the mountain is a long, rocky arête, partly covered with mountain pines which runs over the Hintere Kesselschneid (1,995 m) to the Roßkaiser (1,970 m). To the north its steep rock faces drop into the Winkelkar cirque, to the west lies the long plateau of the Kaisergebirge and the Pyramidenspitze and to the south the mountain falls sharply into the Kaisertal.

== Routes ==
The easiest and most-frequented route to the Vordere Kesselschneid is from the Pyramidenspitze to the northeast. From there you have to descend about 50 metres to a saddle and then make your way without the help of a path, but without any difficulties, across a grassy slope to the cairn on the summit. The walk from the Pyramidenspitze takes 20 minutes.
