= Kaiserbach =

Kaiserbach Sparchenbach
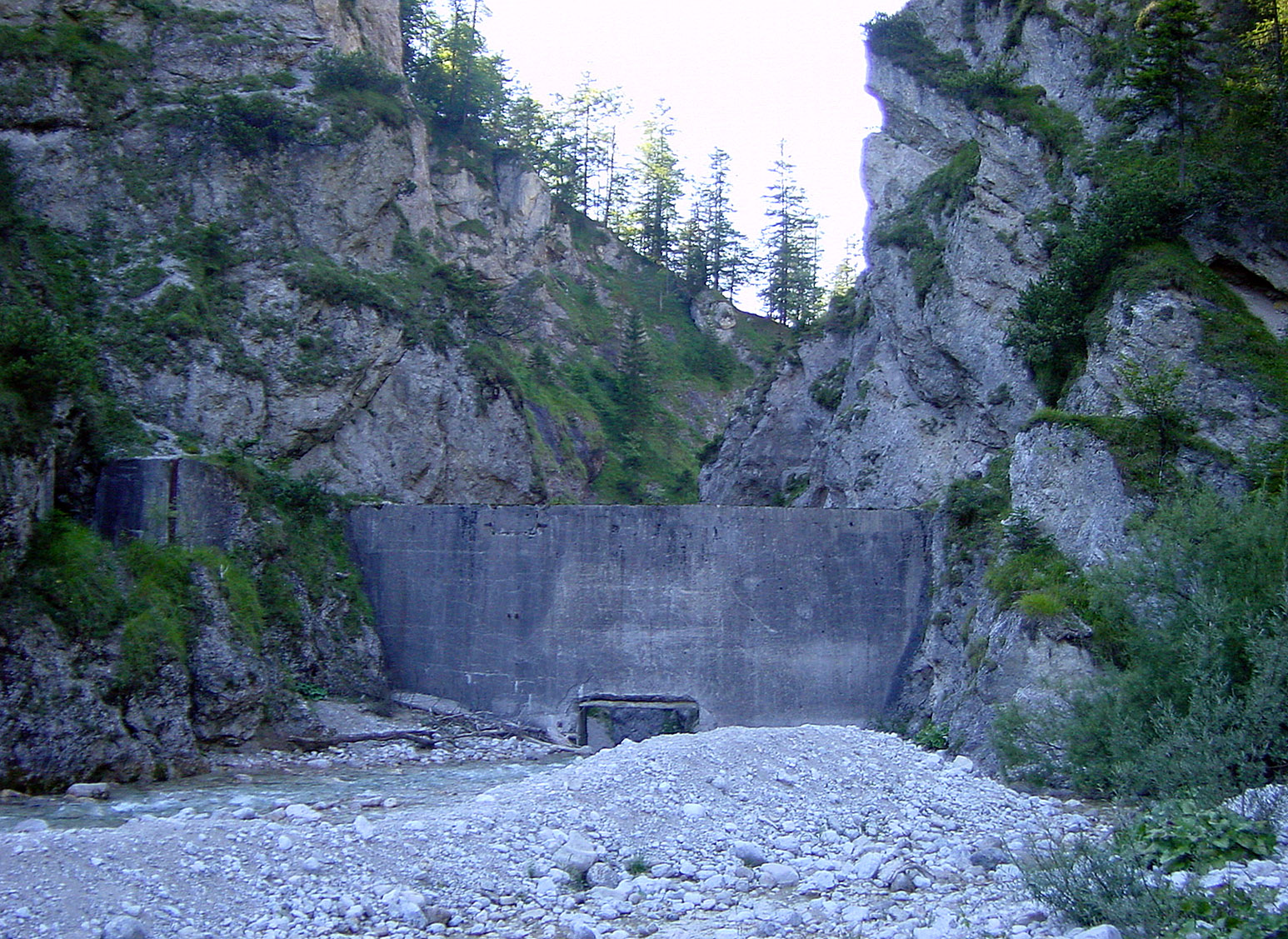
- The Haupttrift Klause

Location
- Country: Austria
- State: Tyrol

Physical characteristics
- Source
  - location: the Stripsenjoch saddle in the Kaiser Mountains
  - elevation: ca. 1,500 m above sea level (NN)
- Mouth
  - location: in Kufstein into the Inn
  - coordinates: 47°36′00″N 12°10′42″E
  - elevation: 474 m above sea level (NN)
- Length: 11.7 km (7.3 mi)

Basin features
- Progression: Inn→ Danube→ Black Sea

The Kaiserbach (also called Sparchenbach) is a river of Tyrol, Austria, in the valley Kaisertal in the Kaiser Mountains in the Tyrolean Unterland. It is a right tributary of the Inn. The Kaiserbach rises at about 1,500 m above sea level (NN) near the Stripsenjoch saddle and empties in Untere Sparchen, a quarter of Kufstein, into the Inn.

The Kaiserbach was important for forestry until the beginning of the 20th century. Felled logs were hauled from many wooded mountainsides in the side valleys of the Kaisertal to the river. The Kaiserbach was impounded ast several weirs. On subsequently opening the lock gates a strong current flowed, enabling the assembled logs to be transported in several stages to Kufstein.

The weirs were known as Klausen and the log transportation as Trift. Today all that has survived is the Haupttrift Klause, a restored collection basin on the river bed, and its associated Klaushütte (weir hut) that used to provide worker accommodation.

The Kaiserbach forms most of the municipal boundary between Kufstein and Ebbs.
