= Feldberg (Olpe) =

- Location within North Rhine-Westphalia

Highest point
- Elevation: 556.2 m above sea level (NN) (1,825 ft)
- Coordinates: 51°04′26″N 7°54′37″E

Geography
- Location: Sauerland, Olpe, North Rhine-Westphalia (Germany)
- Parent range: Rhenish Massif

The Feldberg (German pronunciation: [ˈfɛltˌbɛʁk]) is a hill, 556.2 m above sea level (NN), in the Ebbe Hills Nature Park in the Sauerland in the German state of North Rhine-Westphalia.
