= Feldberg (Bavarian Rhön) =

- Location within Bavaria

Highest point
- Elevation: 570.2 m above sea level (NHN) (1,871 ft)
- Coordinates: 50°21′22″N 10°01′19″E

Geography
- Location: Rhön-Grabfeld, Lower Franconia, Bavaria, Germany
- Parent range: Rhön

The Feldberg (German pronunciation: [ˈfɛltˌbɛʁk]) is a hill, 570.2 m above sea level (NHN), in the Bavarian Rhön, northeast of Sandberg and south of the village of Kilianshof. The Feldberg is a southeastern spur of the des Kreuzbergs.

The Feldberg near Sandberg in the Bavarian Rhön should not be confused with the mountain of Feldberg in the Hessian Rhön near Sandberg (Gersfeld).
