= Kaiser Mountains =

Mountain range in Tyrol, Austria

Kaiser Mountains (Kaisergebirge)
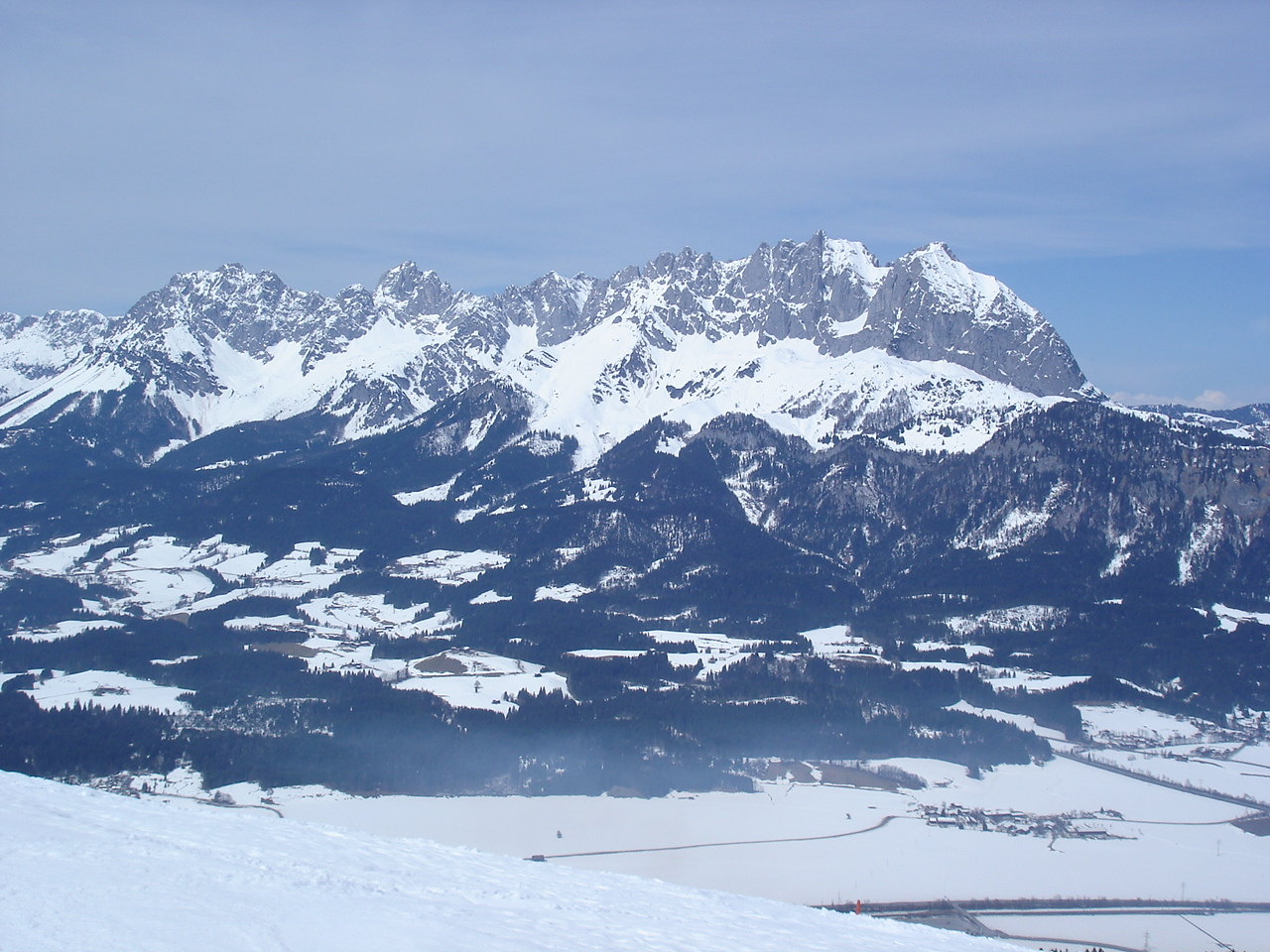
- The Kaiser Mountains from the south

Highest point
- Peak: Ellmauer Halt
- Elevation: 2,344 m (7,690 ft)

Geography
- Country: Austria
- State: Tyrol
- Range coordinates: 47°33′42″N 12°18′7″E
- Parent range: Northern Limestone Alps

Ramsar Wetland
- Official name: Wilder Kaiser
- Designated: 8 April 2013
- Reference no.: 2146

The Kaiser Mountains (German: Kaisergebirge, meaning Emperor Mountains) are a mountain range in the Northern Limestone Alps and Eastern Alps. Its main ridges are the Zahmer Kaiser and south of it the Wilder Kaiser. The mountains are situated in the Austrian province of Tyrol between the towns of Kufstein and St. Johann in Tirol. The Kaiser Mountains have been described as some of the best scenery in the Northern Limestone Alps.

== Divisions ==
The Kaiser Mountains are divided into the Wilder Kaiser or Wild Kaiser chain of mountains, formed predominantly of bare limestone rock, and the Zahmer Kaiser ("Tame Kaiser"), whose southern side is mainly covered by mountain pine. These two mountain ridges are linked by the 1,580-metre-high Stripsenjoch pass, but are separated in the west by the valley of Kaisertal and in the east by the Kaiserbach valley. In total the Kaiser extends for about 20 km (12 mi) in an east-west direction and about 14 km (8.7 mi) from north to south, giving a total area of some 280 square kilometres (110 sq mi). The Zahmer Kaiser only just breaks through the 2,000 metre barrier (in the Vordere Kesselschneid). The highest elevation in the Wilder Kaiser is the Ellmauer Halt in the borough of Kufstein at 2,344 metres (7,690 ft). There are around forty other summits, including many well-known climbing peaks such as the Karlspitzen, Totenkirchl, Fleischbank, Predigtstuhl, Goinger Halt, Ackerlspitze and Maukspitze.

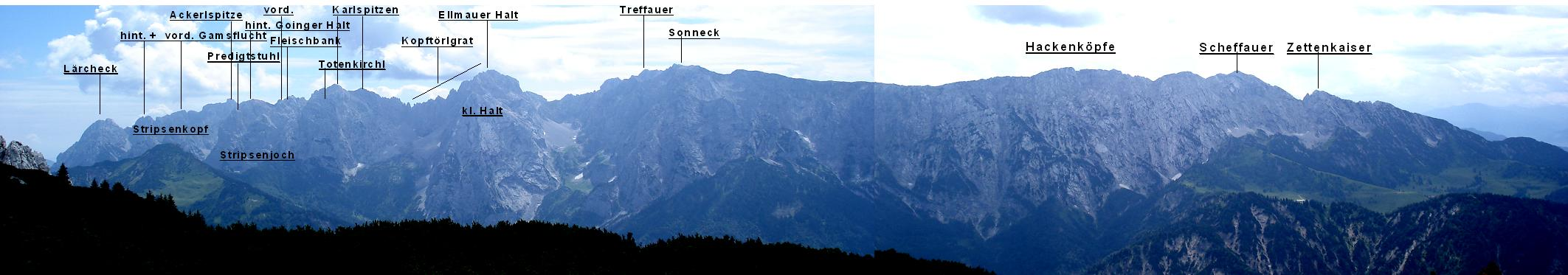
The Wilder Kaiser from the north

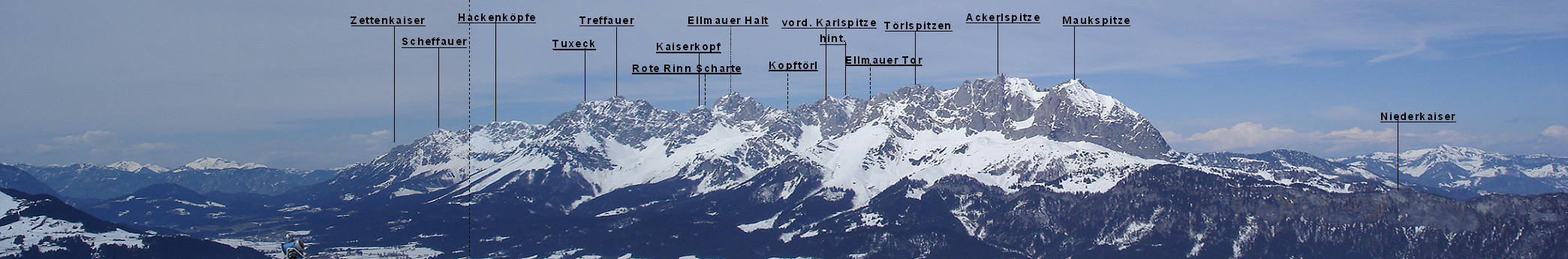
The Kaiser Mountains from the south

== Nature reserve ==
As early as the 1920s individual nature lovers, including the "Emperor Pope", Franz Nieberl, called for greater protection of the unique natural region of the Kaiser. The primary aim of this protection was to prevent over development of the Kaiser Mountains by cable cars and roads. In those days such ideas were unsuccessful. In 1961, following a referendum, it was decided to establish a nature reserve, which was officially opened on 19 April 1963. The reserve, which covered all the peaks of the Wilder and Zahmer Kaiser, has an area of 102 square kilometres (39 sq mi) and lies within the territories of the municipalities of Kufstein, St. Johann in Tirol, Ebbs, Ellmau, Going, Kirchdorf in Tirol, Scheffau and Walchsee. The height of the nature reserve's terrain ranges from 480 m up to 2344 m at the summit of the Ellmauer Halt. The only man-made lift in the protected area is the chair lift to the Brentenjoch saddle. Other lift projects were not realized because of the nature reserve. For a long time, the construction of a road into the Kaisertal valley was hotly contested as it was the only inhabited valley in Austria without road access. The Kaisertal road, which now runs from Ebbs through the Anna Tunnel (813 m long) into the Kaisertal, was opened on 31 May 2008. It was built by the parish of Ebbs as a private road for use only by a very narrow group of beneficiaries: residents, farmers, authorities and organisations with safety functions.

The flora and fauna of the nature reserve is very rich. In the Kaiser Mountains there are about 940 different flowering plants, 38 different species of fern and over 400 different mosses. The colonies of fungi and lichen are very rich, with 100 and 236 different species respectively being represented. The forest region comprises mainly mixed forest with beech, fir and spruce. In the submontane area there are also ash and sycamore maple, and, in sunny areas, alder. Hay meadows, poor grassland and pastures are typical of the alpine meadows. In the subalpine region we find the typical dwarf shrub types such as mountain pine and alpenrose, and the rare dwarf alpenrose. Alpine polsterrasen ("cushion grasslands") are found all the way up to the summit areas. There are various wetlands also stocked with typical plants. As a product of ice age processes the Kaiser is also home to a number of rare, partly endemic invertebrates, such as Allobobophora smaragdina (a yellow-green earthworm), a door snail, and a number of spiders and butterflies. Typical vertebrates are the alpine and fire salamanders, smooth snake, viper (unusual color variants), edible dormouse, hazel dormouse and bank vole. In higher regions there are chamois, stoat, snow vole and mountain hare. Typical birds are wood warbler, the red-breasted flycatcher (for North Tyrol endemic), alpine chough, raven, crag martin, alpine willow tit, lesser redpoll (Carduelis linaria rufescens), alpine accentor, alpine wallcreeper and black grouse - capercaillie and rock ptarmigan. Raptors occurring in the Kaiser are the northern goshawk, Eurasian sparrowhawk, golden eagle, tawny owl, pygmy owl and Tengmalm's owl.

== Geology and hydrology ==
The Kaiser is part of the Northern Limestone Alps and consists mainly of Wetterstein limestone and dolomite. The Wetterstein limestone has a maximum thickness of about 1000 m, which corresponds to the maximum height of the rock faces (Felsabbrüche) of the Kaiser. The younger dolomites are mainly found in the valley hollows. Extensive moraine fields are a remnant of the Würm glaciation. The Kaiser Mountains are drained in the west by the Sparchenbach, which flows through the Kaisertal and later empties into the Inn; in the east by the Kaiserbach, which flows through the Kaiserbachtal and discharges into the Großache which in turn flows into the Chiemsee lake; in the north by the Weissenbach and in the south, in the area west of the so-called Ellmauer Tor, by the Weißache - which also drains into the Inn; and to the east of the Ellmauer Tor (watershed) by the Goinger Hausbach and Rettenbach, both of which flow into the Reither Ache, another tributary of the Großache. Between Fleischbank and the Goinger Halt is a small cirque glacier that will probably disappear soon as average temperatures rise. In the far west of the mountain range is Lake Hinterstein which is used as a bathing lake.

== History ==
The first dated evidence of human settlement in the Kaiser Mountains goes back 4000 to 5000 years. These are discoveries of the remains of Stone Age hunters in the Tischofer Cave. Other discoveries have revealed the presence of Bronze Age settlers in the cave. Documentary evidence of human settlement in the Kaisertal in the Middle Ages date back at least to 1430. There is a purchase agreement from that year for a farm called Hinterkaiser. The name "Kaiser" for the area is older and already appears by 1240 in a Kitzbühel directory of goods which speaks of a Gamsgiayt an dem Chaiser. In 1611 there is an annotation to a picture in the maps of Matthias Burgklehner that states "There is in the dominion of Kufstein the Kayser, a very high mountain range, which is just like an imperial crown, on account of its many peaks, and also because it appears from an altitude and miles away as if it is round and crowned." (original: "Es ist in der Herrschaft Khueffstein der Kayser, ein sehr hoches Gepürg, so einer kaiserlichen Cron gleich ist, seiner vilfeltigen Zinggen halber, dann auch, dass er in der Heche vil Meils Wegs weit, als ob er rund und gekrönt ware, gesehen wird.")

The touristic development of the Kaiser began in the second half of the 19th century. Most of the documented first ascents of its summits date from that time until the turn of the century. It is likely, however, that most of the peaks had already been climbed from time to time by local herders and poachers, without any records having been kept. The time from the late 19th century to the First World War was a period when the limestone faces of the Wilder Kaiser were the cradle of Munich's climbing scene, when well-known climbing pioneers like Hans Dülfer developed entirely new climbing techniques and styles. Other well-known climbers from various periods who opened new routes on the Kaiser are Paul Preuss, Matthias Rebitsch, Hermann Buhl, and Alexander Huber.

The sometimes highly technology-centric climbing styles and techniques developed mainly before the First World War influenced climbing in the Kaiser until the 1960s. In 1977, grade VII climbing was introduced with the free ascent of the Pumprisse by Reinhard Karl and Helmut Kiene on the Fleischbank. In the 1970s and 1980s a whole range of sometimes extremely difficult sport climbing routes were opened in the Kaiser mountains. The most difficult currently is "The Emperor's New Clothes" route (Des Kaisers neue Kleider, grade X+) by Stefan Glowacz on the Fleischbank pinnacle.

== Important peaks and routes in the Wilder Kaiser ==
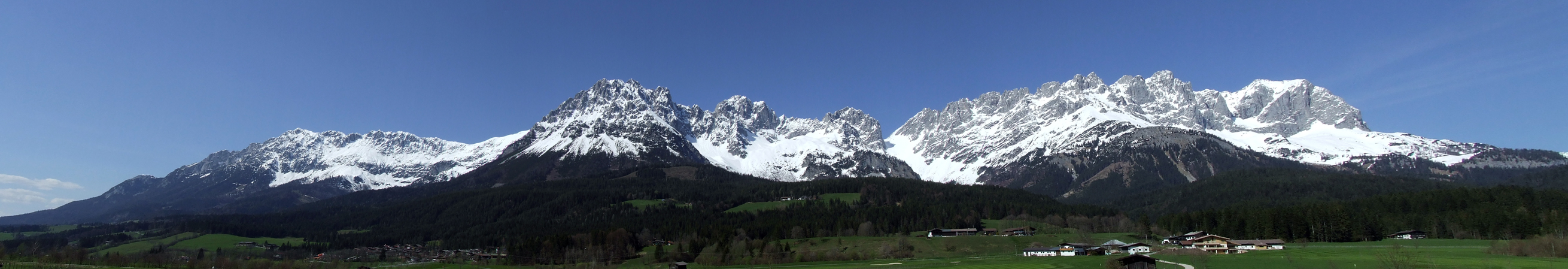
south side of the Wilder Kaiser seen from Ellmau

- Ellmauer Halt (2,344 m (7,690 ft))
- Ackerlspitze (2,329 m (7,641 ft))
- Treffauer (2,304 m (7,559 ft))
- Gamshalt (2,291 m (7,516 ft))
- Karlspitzen (2,281 m (7,484 ft))
- Sonneck (2,260 m (7,410 ft))
- Regalmspitze (2,253 m (7,392 ft))
- Goinger Halt (2,242 m (7,356 ft))
- Maukspitze (2,231 m (7,320 ft))
- Tuxegg (2,226 m (7,303 ft))
- Törlspitzen (2,204 m (7,231 ft))
- Totenkirchl (2,190 m (7,190 ft))
- Fleischbank (2,186 m (7,172 ft))
- Kopfkraxen (2,178 m (7,146 ft))
- Kaiserkopf (2,164 m (7,100 ft))
- Hackenköpfe (2,126 m (6,975 ft))
- Lärcheck (2,123 m (6,965 ft))
- Predigtstuhl (2,118 m (6,949 ft))
- Kleine Halt (2,116 m (6,942 ft))
- Scheffauer (2,111 m (6,926 ft))
- Mitterkaiser (2,011 m (6,598 ft))
- Zettenkaiser (1,968 m (6,457 ft))

== Gallery ==
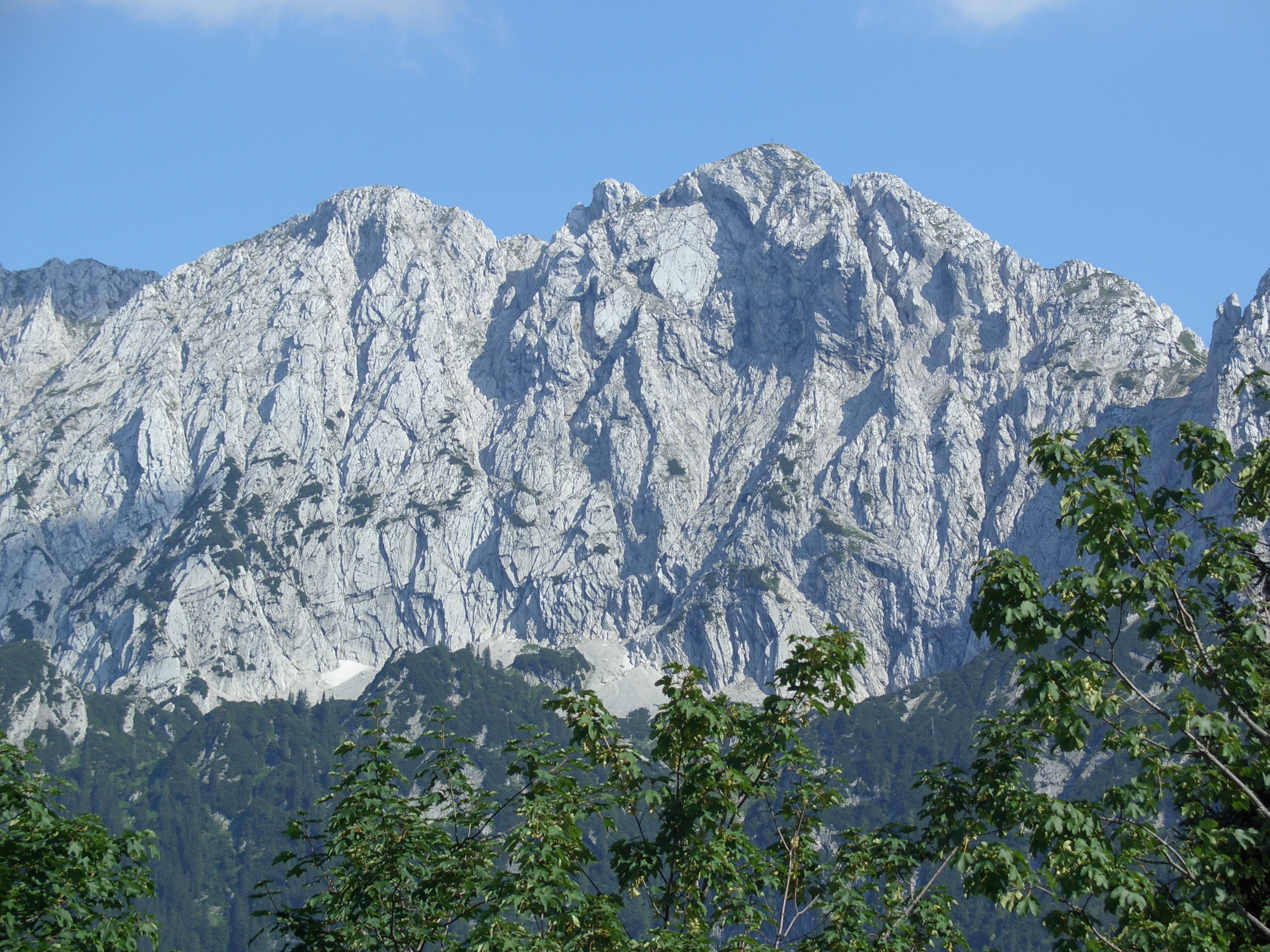
Wilder Kaiser, north side (Scheffauer)

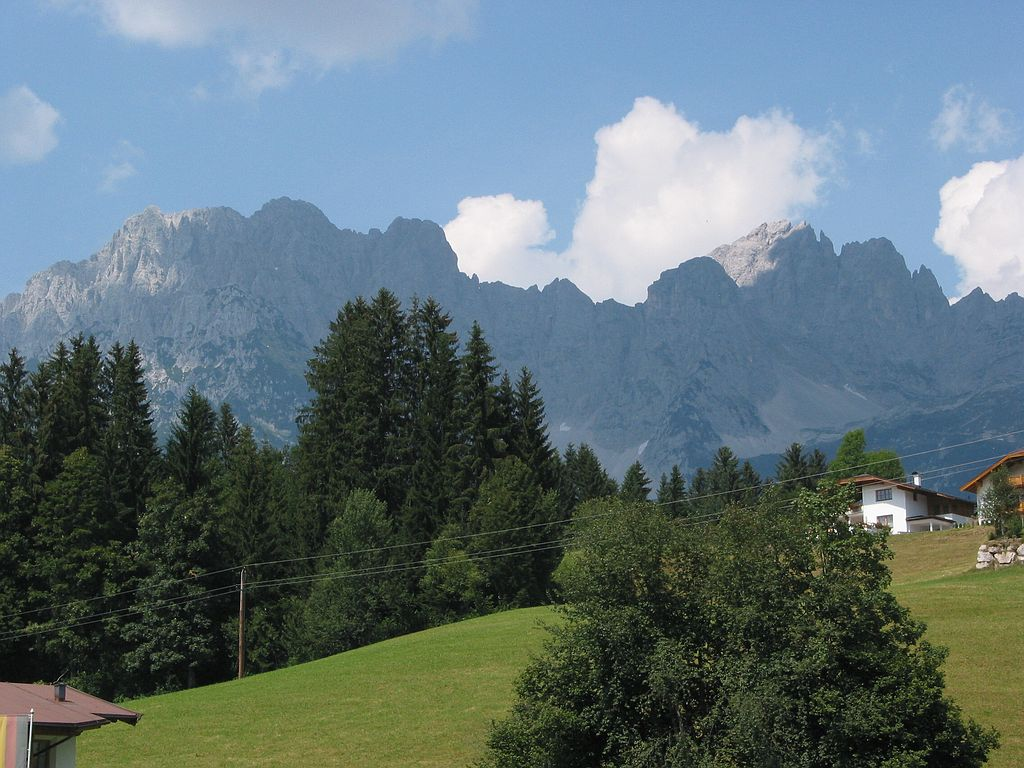
Wilder Kaiser, south side

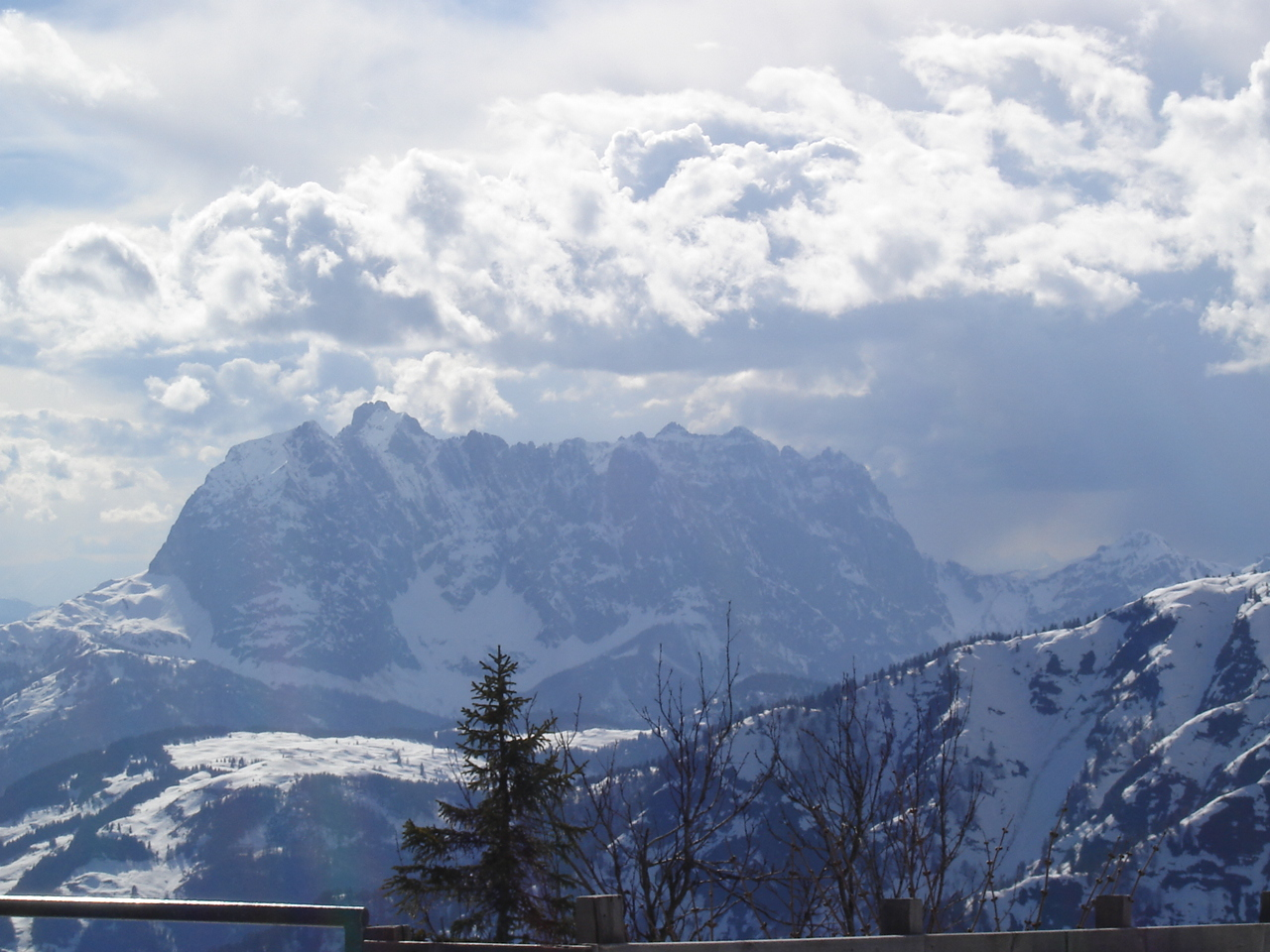
Wilder Kaiser, east side

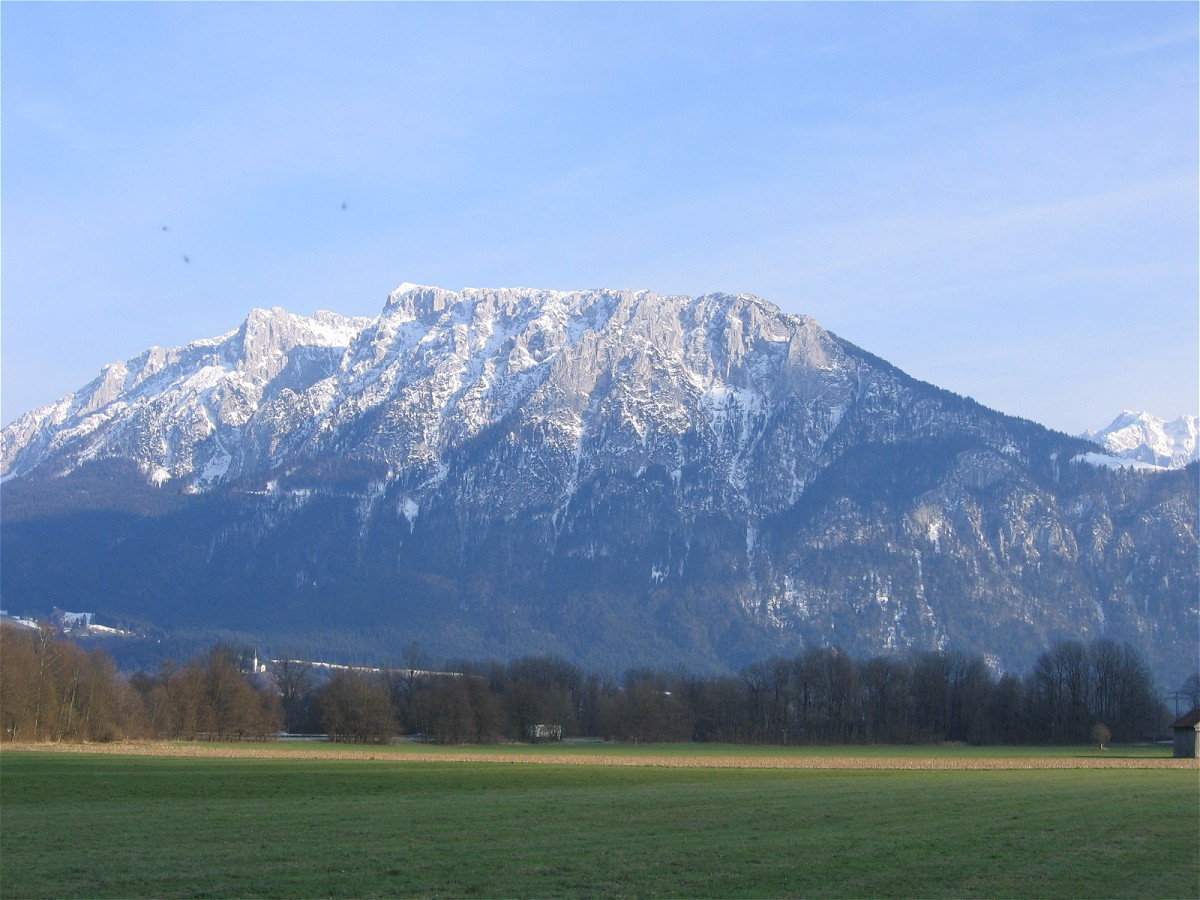
The Zahmer Kaiser seen from Oberaudorf

== Important peaks in the Zahmer Kaiser ==
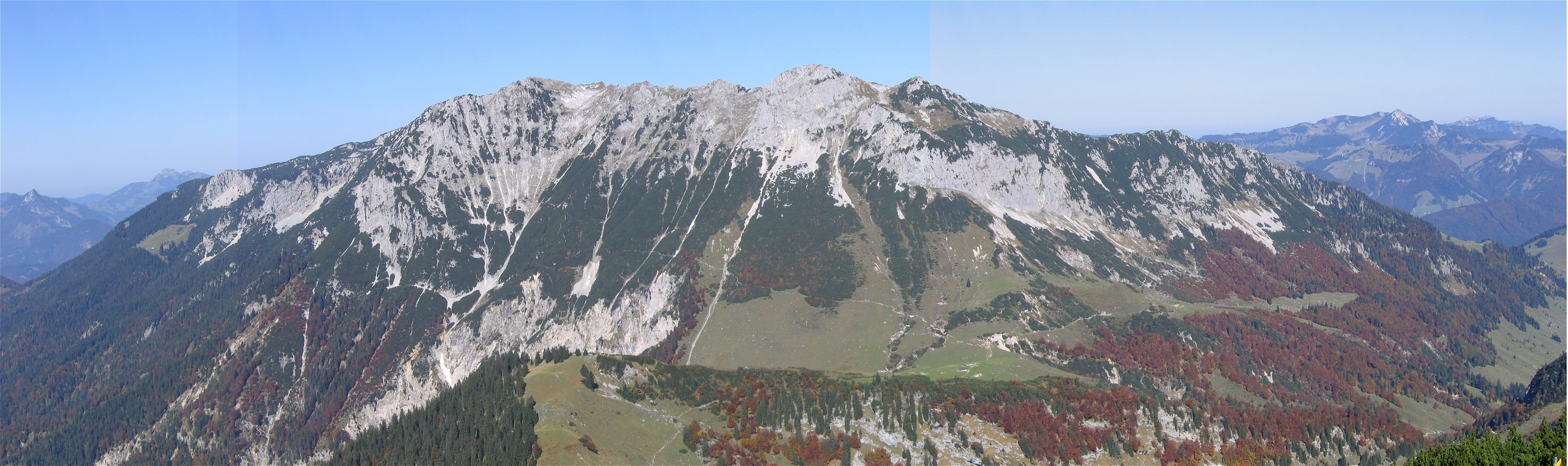
The Zahmer Kaiser seen from Stripsenkopf

- Vordere Kesselschneid (2,002 m (6,568 ft))
- Pyramidenspitze (1,998 m (6,555 ft))
- Roßkaiser (1,970 m (6,460 ft))
- Elferkogel (1,916 m (6,286 ft))
- Jovenspitze (1,890 m (6,200 ft))
- Feldberg (1,814 m (5,951 ft))
- Stripsenkopf (1,807 m (5,928 ft))
- Petersköpfl (1,745 m (5,725 ft))
- Naunspitze (1,633 m (5,358 ft))

== Neighbouring mountain groups ==
Location on Earth

The Kaiser borders on the following other mountain groups in the Alps:

- Chiemgau Alps (to the north)
- Loferer Steinberge (to the east)
- Kitzbühel Alps (to the south)
- Rofan (to the southwest)
- Bavarian Pre-Alps (to the northwest)

== Mountain huts ==
- Alpine Club huts: Vorderkaiserfelden Hut, Anton Karg Haus/Hinterbärenbad, Stripsenjochhaus, Gaudeamus Hut, Grutten Hut, Fritz Pflaum Hut, Ackerl Hut
- Private huts: Berghaus Aschenbrenner, Brentenjoch Hut, Hans Berger Haus, Griesner Alm, Kaindl Hut, Pfandlhof, Riedl Hut, Rietzaualm, Veitenhof, Walleralm, Weinbergerhaus, Wochenbrunner Alm

== Valley settlements ==
Kufstein, Ebbs, Durchholzen, Kiefersfelden, Walchsee, Kössen, Schwendt, Kirchdorf in Tirol, St. Johann in Tirol, Going, Ellmau, Scheffau, Söll

== See also ==
- Limestone Alps

== Literature ==
- Schubert, Pit (2000). (Alpenvereinsführer extrem) Kaisergebirge. Bergverlag Rother. ISBN 3-7633-1272-2.
- Höfler, Horst and Piepenstock, Jan (2006). (Alpenvereinsführer alpin) Kaisergebirge. Bergverlag Rother. ISBN 3-7633-1257-9.
- Stadler, Markus (2009). Kletterführer Wilder Kaiser, Vol 1 (Niveau 3-6). Panico-Alpinverlag, 3rd ed. ISBN 3-936740-06-2.
- Stadler, Markus (2004). Kletterführer Wilder Kaiser, Vol 2 (Niveau 6-10). Panico-Alpinverlag, 1st ed. ISBN 3-936740-13-5.
- Stadler, Markus, Strauß Andrea and Andreas (2009). Bildband Kaisergebirge. Bergverlag Rother, 1st ed. ISBN 978-3-7633-7050-4.
