= Ellmauer Halt =

Mountain peak in the Kaiser range in Tyrol, Austria

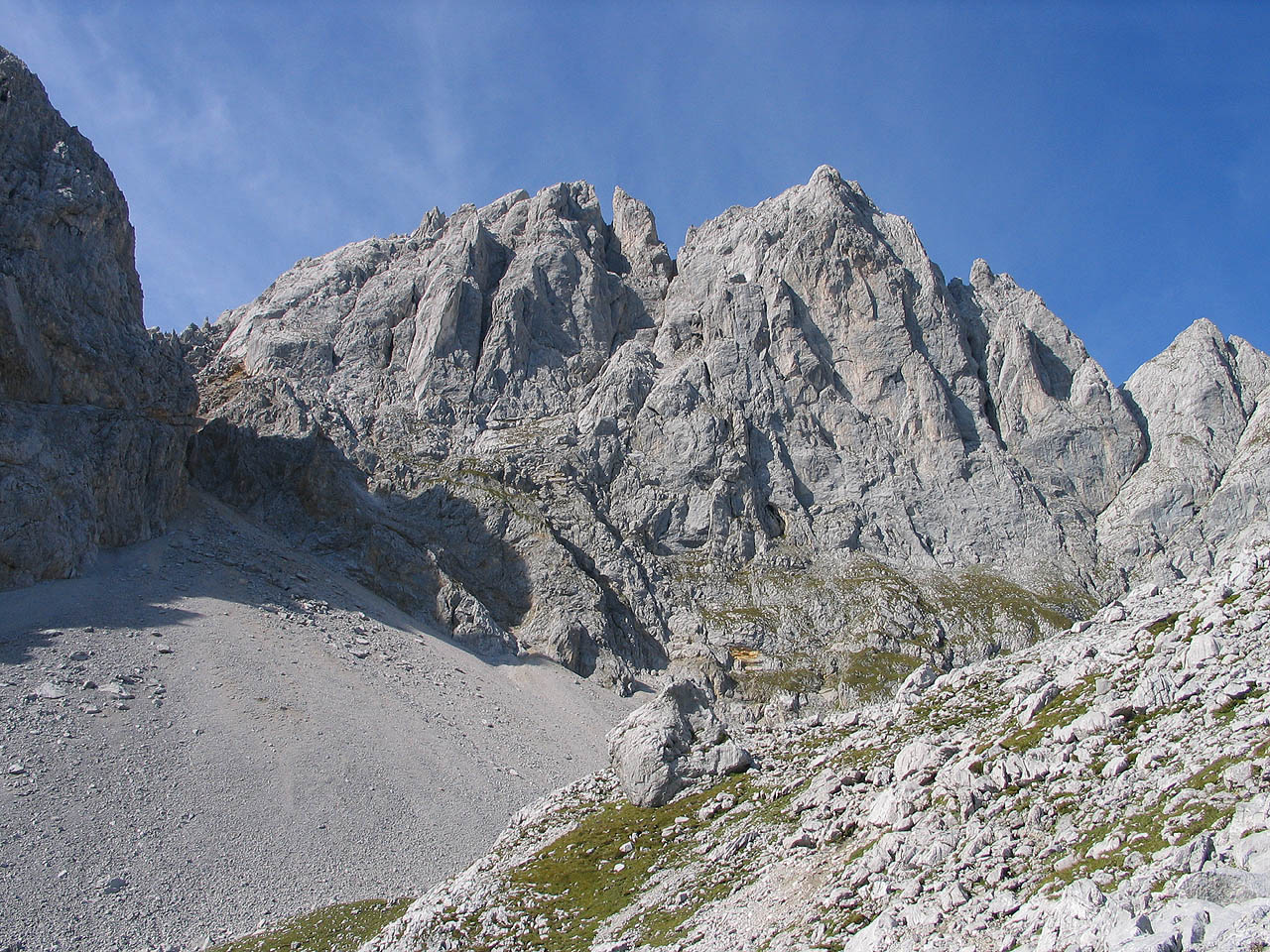
- The Ellmauer Halt from the south

Highest point
- Elevation: 2,344 m (7,690 ft)
- Prominence: 1,552 m (5,092 ft)
- Listing: Ultra
- Coordinates: 47°33′44″N 12°18′11″E

Geography
- Location within Alps
- Location: Tyrol, Austria
- Parent range: Kaiser Mountains

Geology
- Rock age: Triassic
- Mountain type: Wetterstein limestone

Climbing
- First ascent: 29 June 1869 by K. Hofmann and J. Schlechter
- Easiest route: Gamsängersteig from the south (moderate climb)

The Ellmauer Halt (2,344 m) is the highest peak in the mountain massif of the Wilder Kaiser in the Kaiser range (Northern Limestone Alps) in the Austrian state of Tyrol. To the east is the summit of the Kapuzenturm, a striking and isolated rock pinnacle. In 1883 the first summit cross was erected on the mountain top.

The base camp for climbing tours on this mountain is the Grutten Hut mountain hut on its southern flank, at a height of 1,620 m. There is also the unoccupied, tiny Babenstuber Hut, immediately below the summit. This shelter and emergency refuge has stood on the Ellmauer Halt since 1891, but is not weatherproof. In any case the peak should only be climbed in good weather with dry conditions by experienced climbers with secure footwear, no fear of heights and climbing agility. Due to the popularity of the Ellmauer Halt there is a high risk of falling rocks, especially on the normal path, the Gamsängersteig. A helmet and even a Klettersteig set are therefore recommended.

== Routes ==
Two well-known Klettersteigs (climbing paths) lead to the summit:

- The Gamsängersteig from the Grutten Hut is the normal route and is of medium difficulty. It is generally well secured, but is used on good summer's days by countless climbers, so there is a high risk of falling rocks. It takes 2.5 hours to climb.
- The Kaiserschützensteig is a demanding alternative to the normal route. It is much longer, harder and technically more difficult than the Gamsängersteig. In addition, in starting from the Kaisertal, a substantial approach march and greater height difference have to be overcome. The starting points are the Anton Karg Haus or Hans Berger Haus. The Kaiserschützensteig is very scenic and crosses all three summits of the massif: the Kleine Halt, the Gamshalt and the Ellmauer Halt and offers some impressive views. Climbing time: 4 hours.

Also:

- Rote-Rinn-Scharte (Rote Rinn wind gap) which is the marked climb running from the Hans-Berger-Haus via the Scharlinger Boden up to the Rote-Rinn-Scharte. This saddle is also used by the Gamsängersteig, enabling the Grutten Hut to be reached. This route acts as a link between the Kaisertal in the north and the Grutten Hut in the south.
- The so-called Kopftörlgrat is the eastern arête of the Ellmauer Halt over which a very popular climbing route runs (UIAA grade III-IV).
Photos
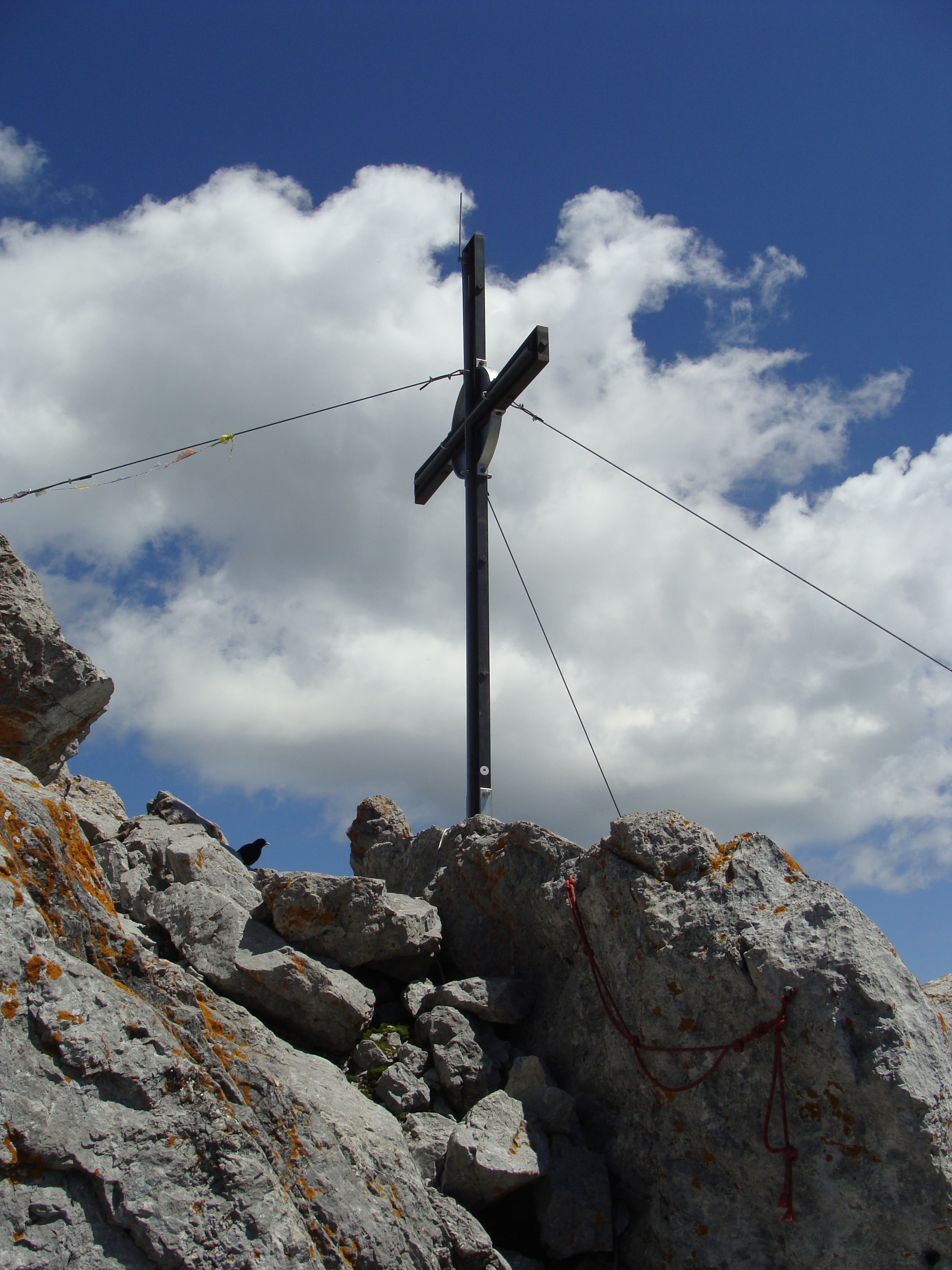
Summit

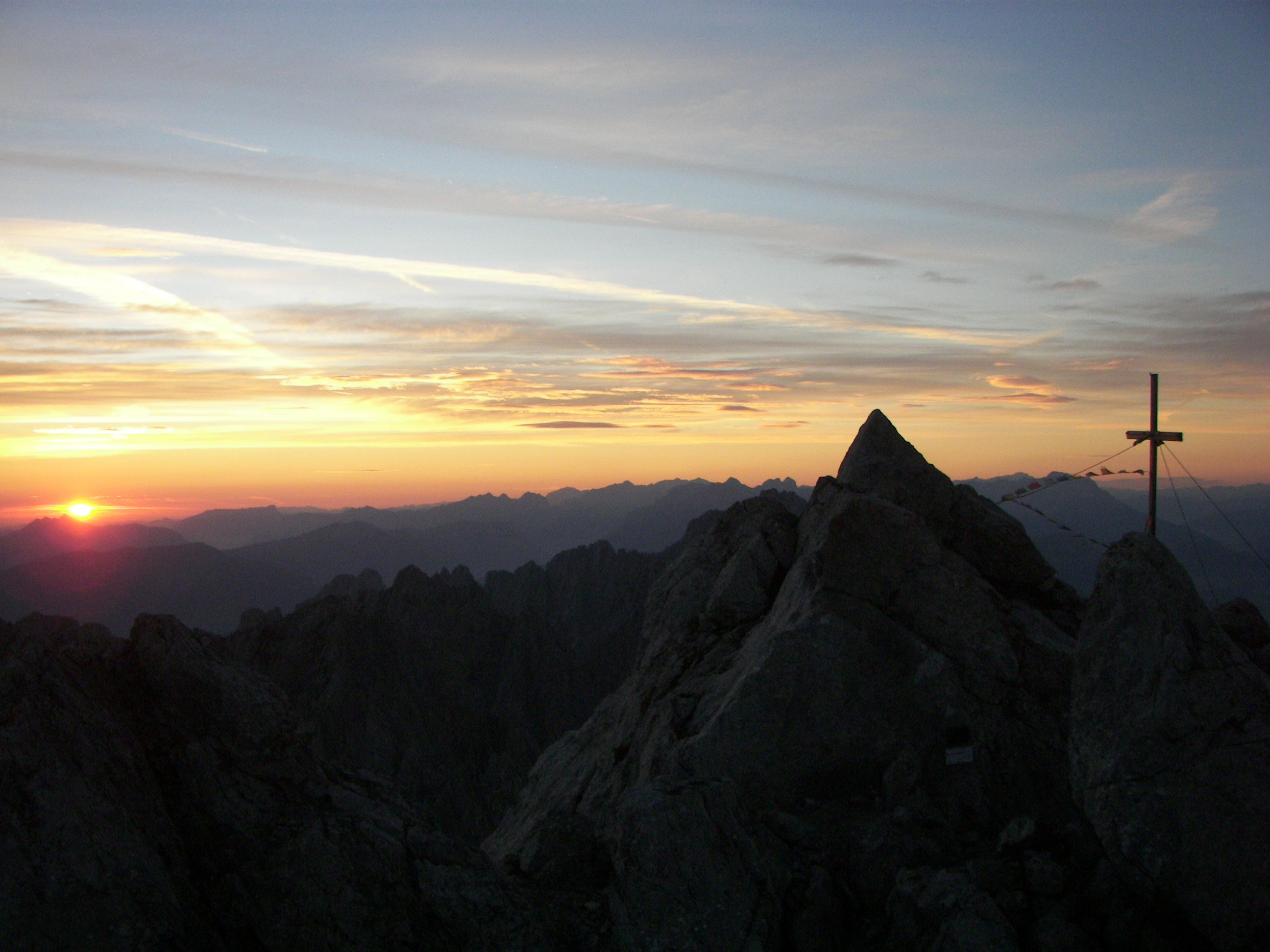
Sunrise at the summit

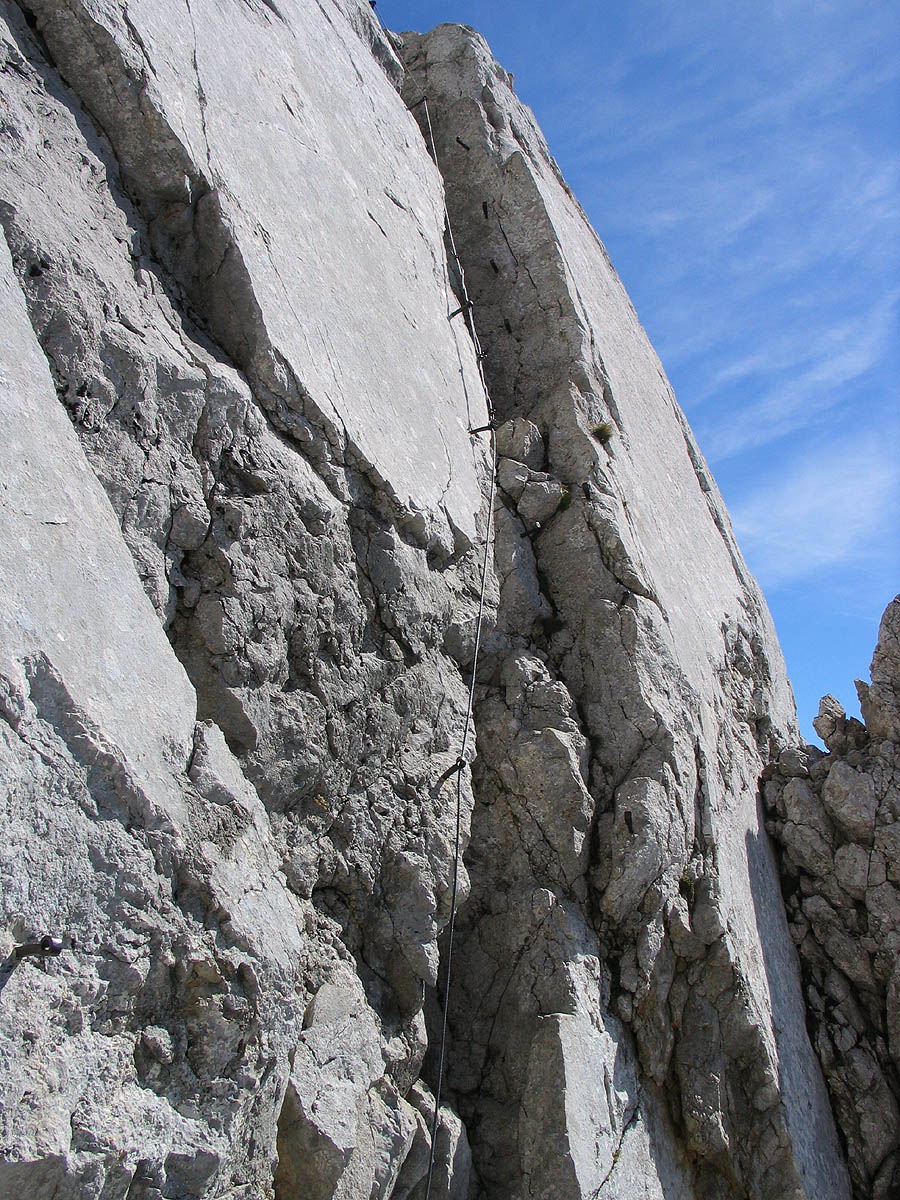
Crux on the upper part of the Gamsängersteig

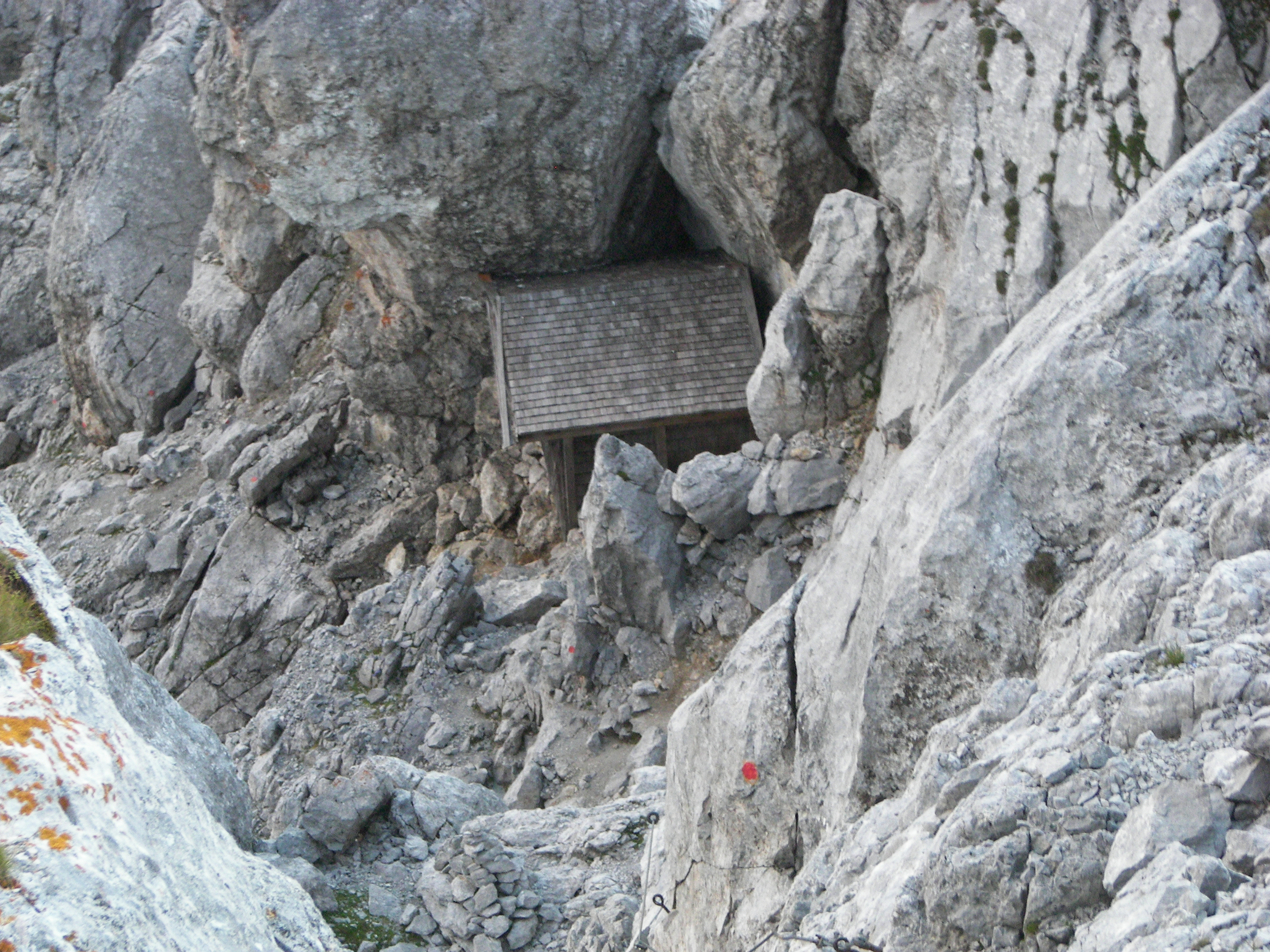
The Babenstuber Hut just below the summit of the Ellmauer Halt

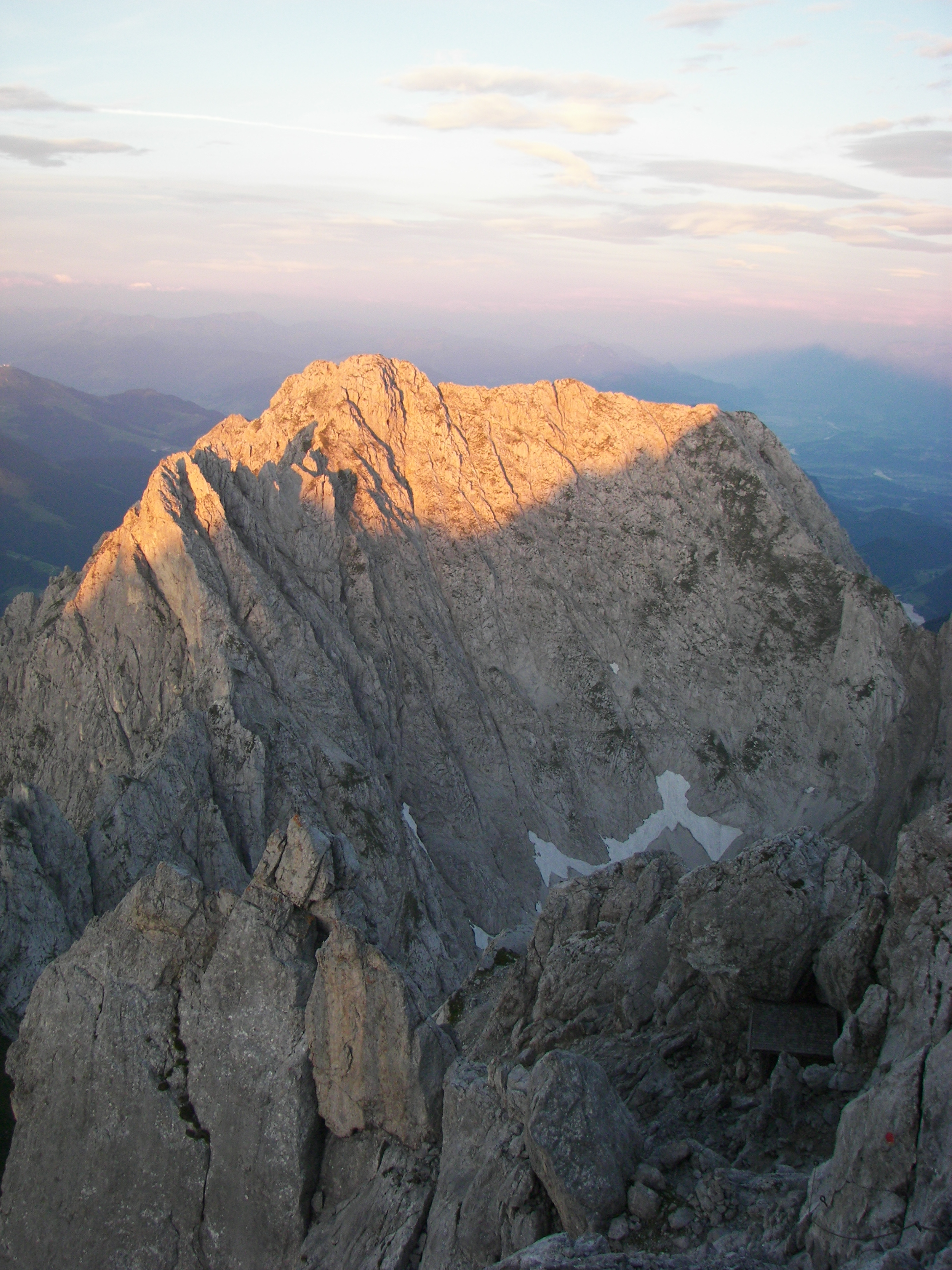
View towards the Inn valley from Ellmauer Halt shortly before sunrise

== See also ==
- List of Alpine peaks by prominence
