= Totenkirchl =

2,190m mountain, Wilder Kaiser, Tyrol

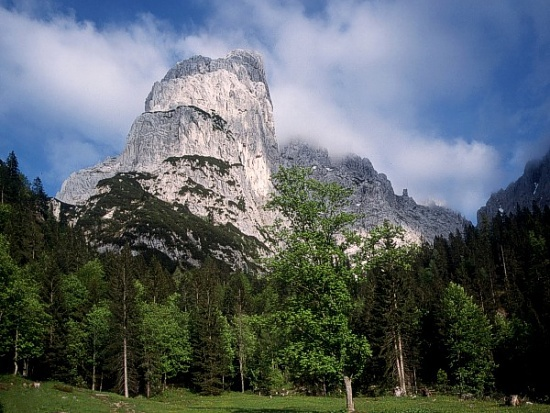

Highest point
- Elevation: 2,190 m (AA) (7,190 ft)
- Coordinates: 47°34′12″N 12°18′43″E

Geography
- Location within Austria
- Location: Tyrol, Austria
- Parent range: Kaisergebirge

Climbing
- First ascent: 1881 by Gottfried Merzbacher, Soyer

The Totenkirchl is mountain, 2,190 m high, in the Wilder Kaiser range in the Northern Limestone Alps in Austria, east of Kufstein in Tyrol.

The mountain is one of the most famous climbs in the Northern Limestone Alps with over 50 climbing routes of UIAA grade III. It is particularly known for its chimneys including the Dülfer Chimney (Dülfer-Kamin) named after Hans Dülfer. The base camp for tours on the Totenkirchl is the Stripsenjochhaus owned by the ÖAV.
