= Stripsenjoch =

Small mountain pass in Austria

Coordinates: 47°34′36″N 12°18′38″E

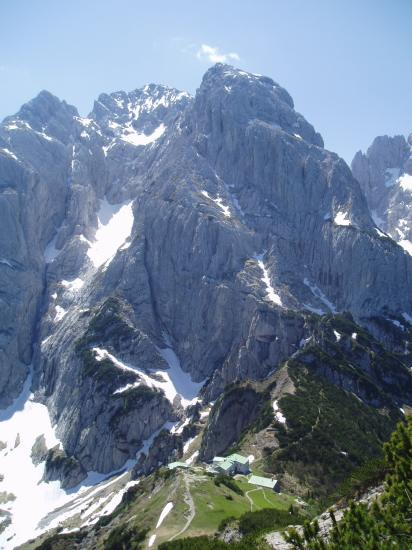
View of the Stripsenjoch pass and Stripsenjochhaus. In the background the mountains of the Wilder Kaiser

The Stripsenjoch is a small mountain pass (German: Joch or Pass) in Austria with a height of 1,577 m (AA), which forms a bridge between the mountain ridges of the Zahmer Kaiser and the Wilder Kaiser, the two halves of the Kaisergebirge. In addition it marks the watershed between the Kaisertal in the west (towards Kufstein) and the Kaiserbach valley in the east. It derives its name from the neighbouring peak of the Stripsenkopf (1807 m). At the same time the Stripsenkopf is the local mountain (Hausberg) for the Stripsenjochhaus, an Alpine club hut belonging to the Austrian Alpine Club (Österreichischer Alpenverein).

The Stripsenjoch is most easily reached on foot by a ca. 1 1/2 hour walk from the Griesner Alm at 989 m. To avoid the toll road, the path may be taken directly from Griesenau (727 m) and the walk takes around 3 hours. The walk from Kufstein (500 m) needs a good 4 1/2 hours.

== See also ==
- List of highest paved roads in Europe
- List of mountain passes
