= Kaiserbach Valley =

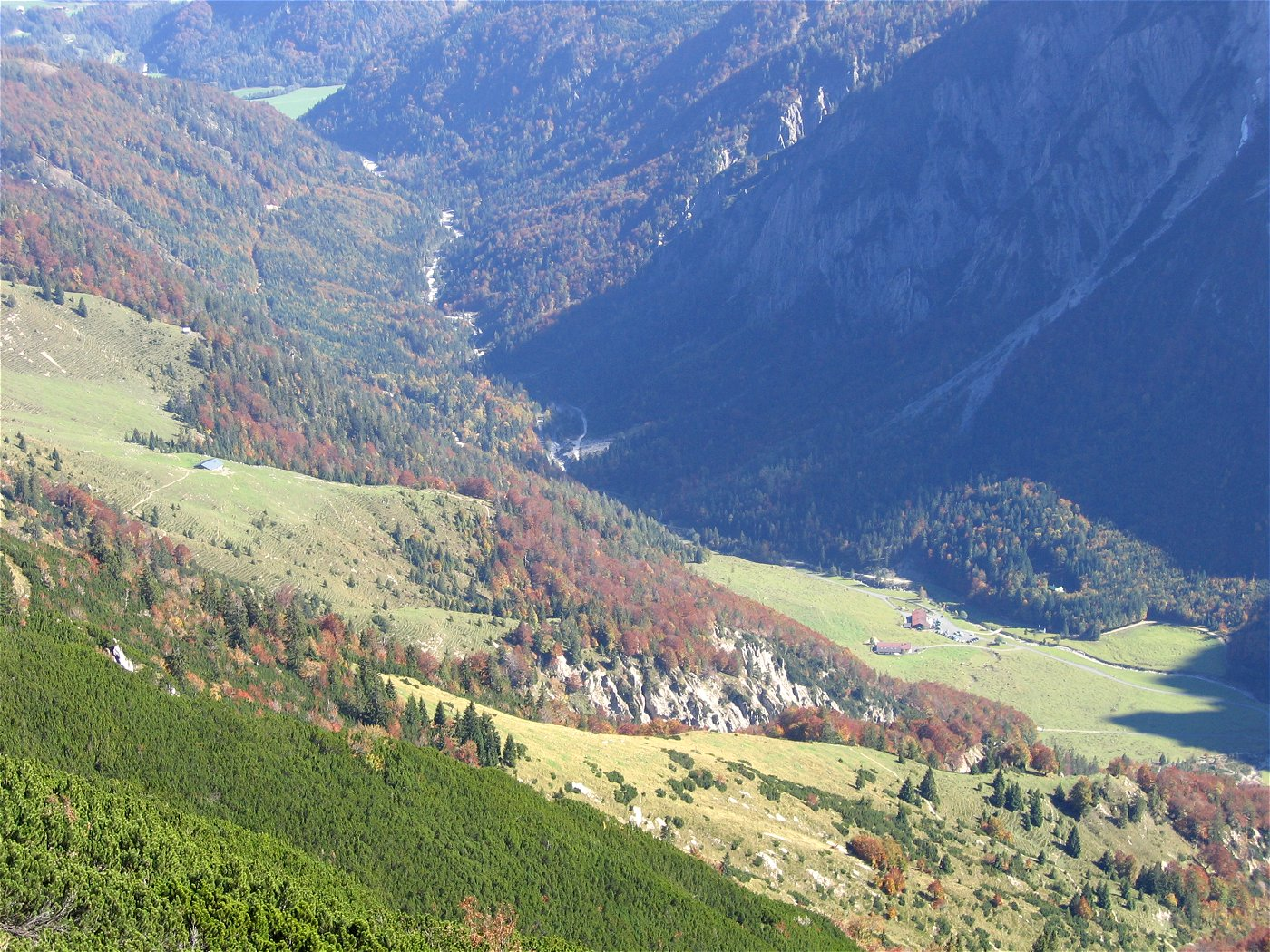
The Kaiserbach valley seen from the Feldberg

The Kaiserbach Valley (German: Kaiserbachtal) is a mountain valley in the Austrian province of Tyrol in the district of Kitzbühel. The Kaiserbach Valley runs from Griesenau to Stripsenjoch; it therefore lies in the eastern part of the Kaiser Mountains. To the north, it is bordered by the Feldberg, which belongs to the Zahmer Kaiser mountain group. To the south, the Kaiserbach Valley is framed by the main eastern crest of the Wilder Kaiser. The Kaiserbach stream flows through the valley. The valley is the departure point for mountain climbing in the Eastern Kaiser. Bases for climbing include the Griesener Alm, which is accessed via a toll road, the Stripsenjochhaus, and the unoccupied Fritz Pflaum Hut mountain hut in Griesener Cirque (Griesener Kar).
