= Kaisertal =

Mountain valley in Austria's Kaisergebirge range

Coordinates: 47°35′42″N 12°13′40″E

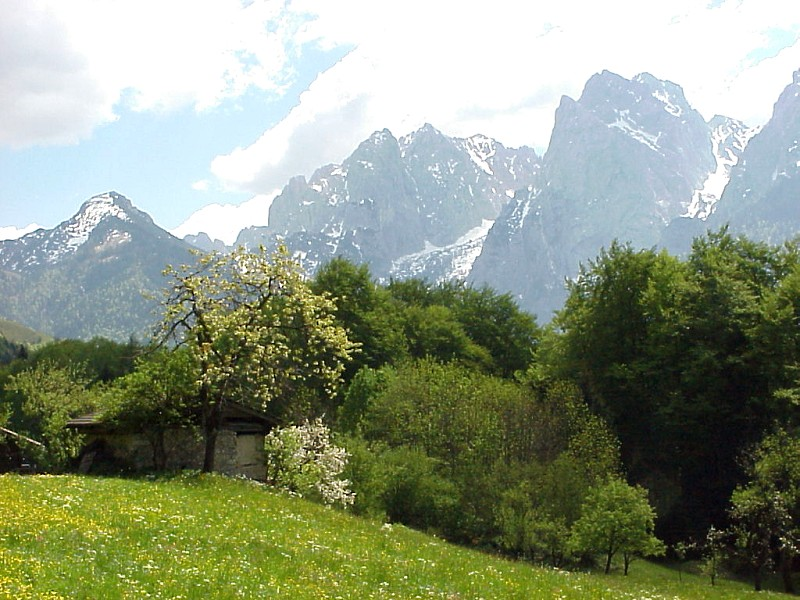
Ellmauer Halt

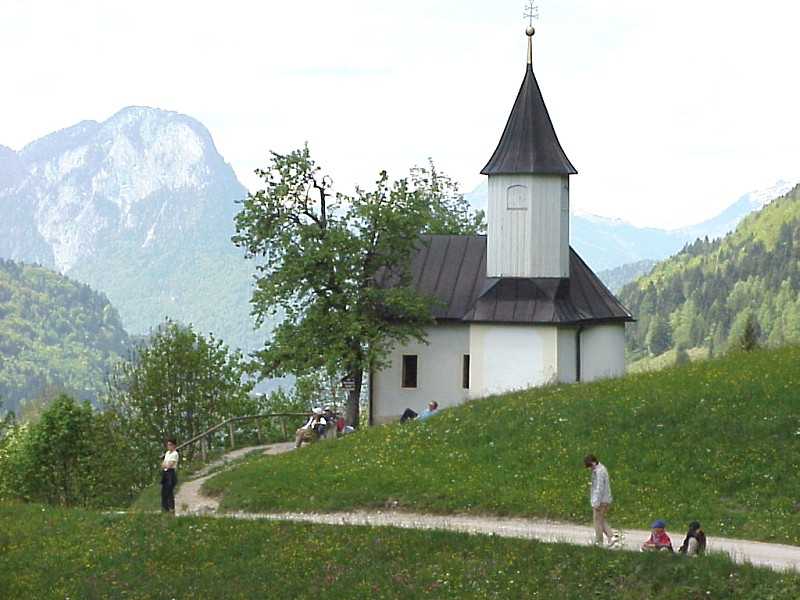
St Anthony's Chapel, View of the valley and Pendling

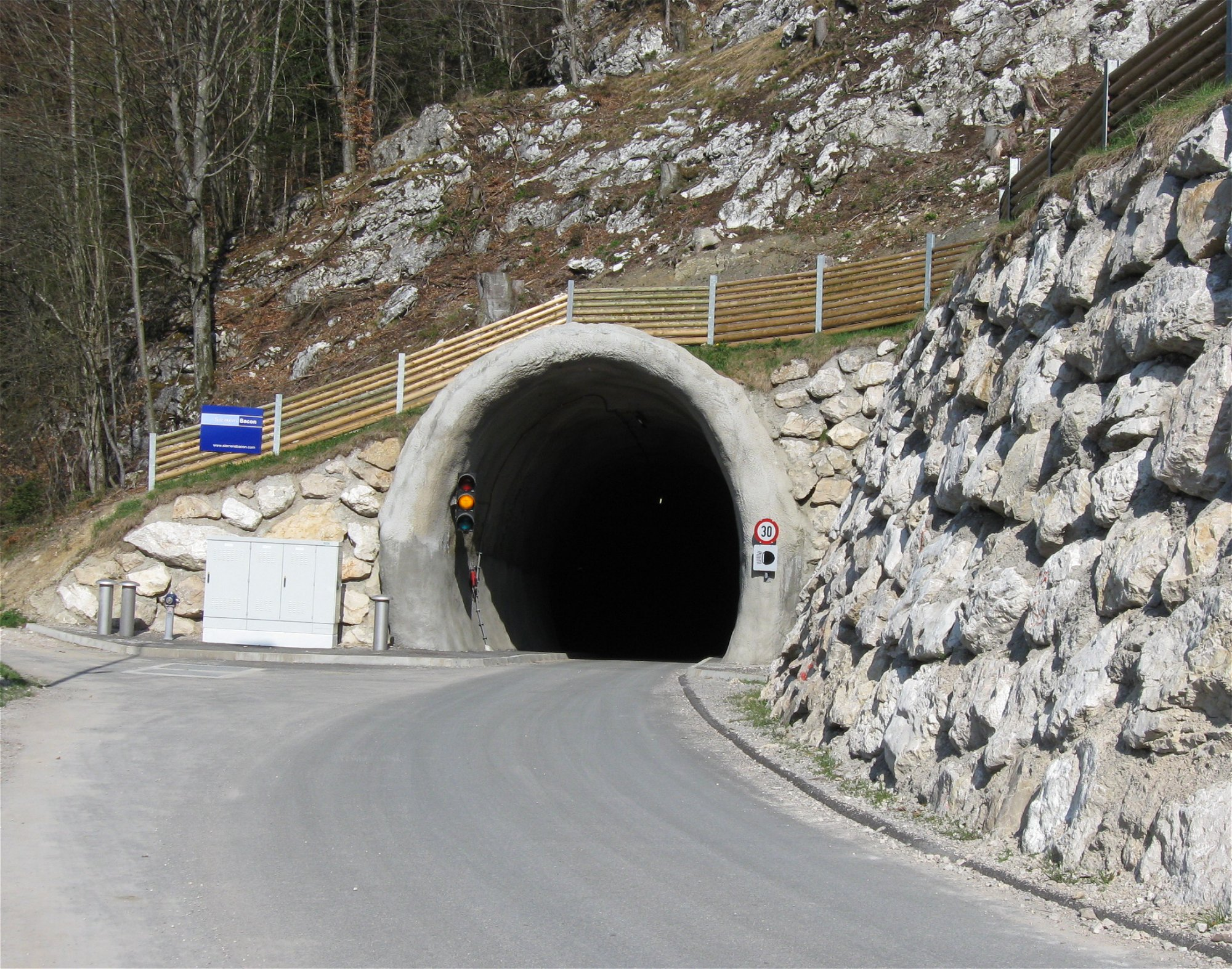
Tunnel in the Kaisertal, upper tunnel portal

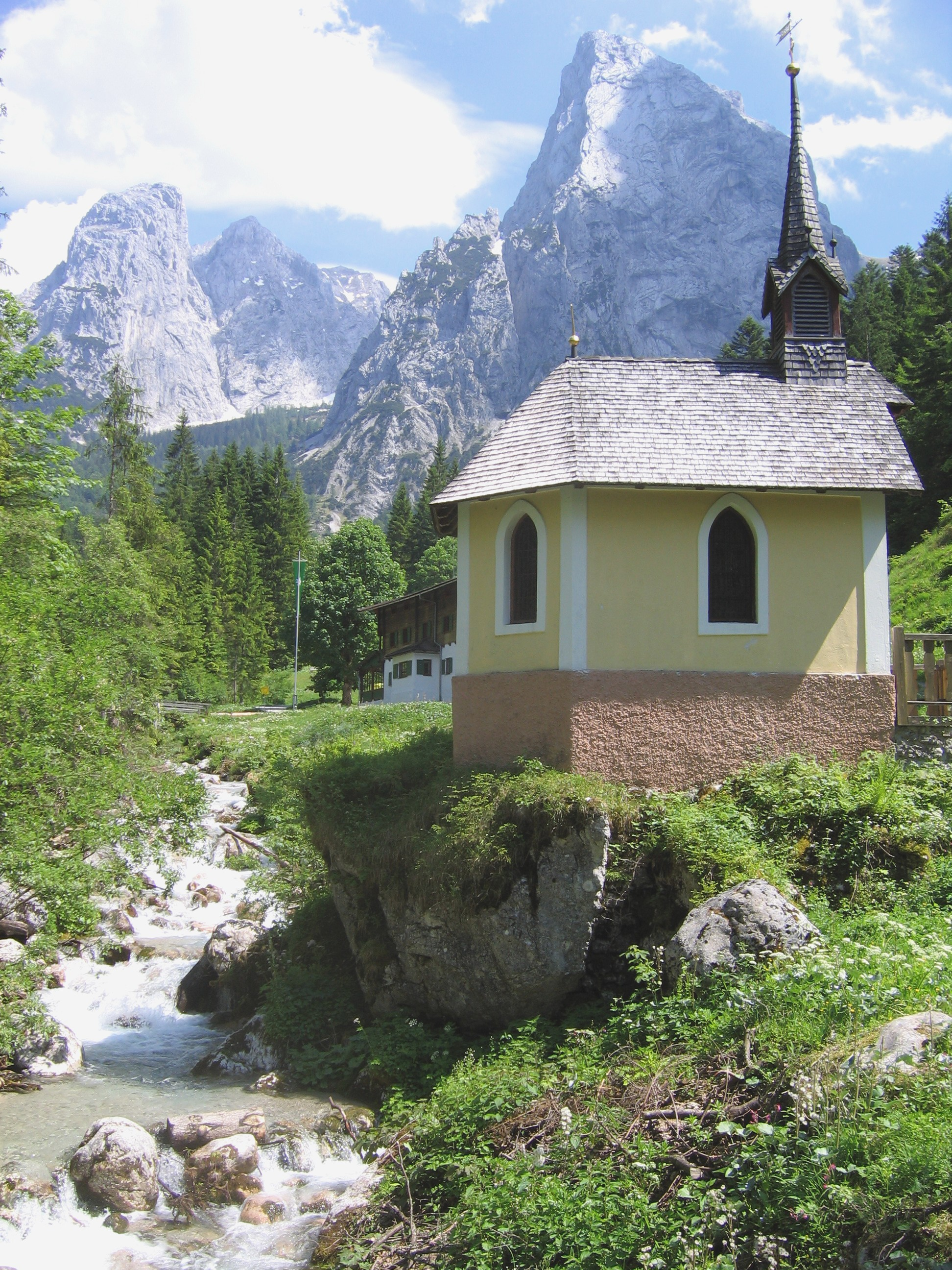
Hinterbärenbad

The Kaisertal (formerly Sparchental) is a striking mountain valley between the mountain chains of the Zahmer and Wilder Kaiser in Austria's Kaisergebirge range in the Tyrol. In the ravine (Sparchenklamm) on the valley floor flows the stream of the Kaiserbach (Sparchenbach), which discharges north of Kufstein into the Inn (river). It is home to several, scenic isolated farms (e.g. the Pfandlhof and Veitenhof). A popular calendar image is St. Anthony's Chapel (Antoniuskapelle) on the Kaisertal footpath in the centre of the valley.

The Kaisertal lies within the Kaisergebirge Nature Reserve (created in 1963) and, until 1 June 2008, could only be reached on foot. The most frequently used approach route runs from Eichelwang (Ebbs) over ca. 280 steps on the Kaiseraufstieg into the valley. The Kaisertal was the last inhabited valley in Austria without a road link. The cars and motorcycles of the farmers in the Kaisertal were either flown in by helicopter or transported in pieces over the Kaiseraufstieg. For years there were discussions about improving access to the Kaisertal. Suggestions included the construction of an inclined lift (Schrägaufzug) or an improved form of the existing aerial ropeway (Materialseilbahn) from Kufstein.

The first cut of the spade for the construction of a road from Ebbs through a ca. 800 m long tunnel to the Kaisertal took place on 19 May 2006. For reasons of nature conservation the road was only to be used by the inhabitants, firms and emergency vehicles (secured with barriers and keys). The building of the road was only agreed after years of negotiations by the village of Ebbs with the town of Kufstein (the largest land owner in the Kaisertal). For a long time Kufstein was against the road in the Kaisertal for conservation reasons and had offered to upgrade the existing cable car for the inhabitants there so that vehicles could be transported there. This was rejected by the village of Ebbs.

On 10 March 2007 the tunnel broke through into the Kaisertal. The development of the tunnel and the road were completed in autumn 2007; work then began on canalisation in the valley. On 31 May 2008 the tunnel was officially opened to traffic.

== Points of interest ==
- Tischof Cave
- Klaushütte and Haupttrift-Klause (see also: Kaiserbach)
