= Kufstein =

Kufstein Kufstoa
- Municipality
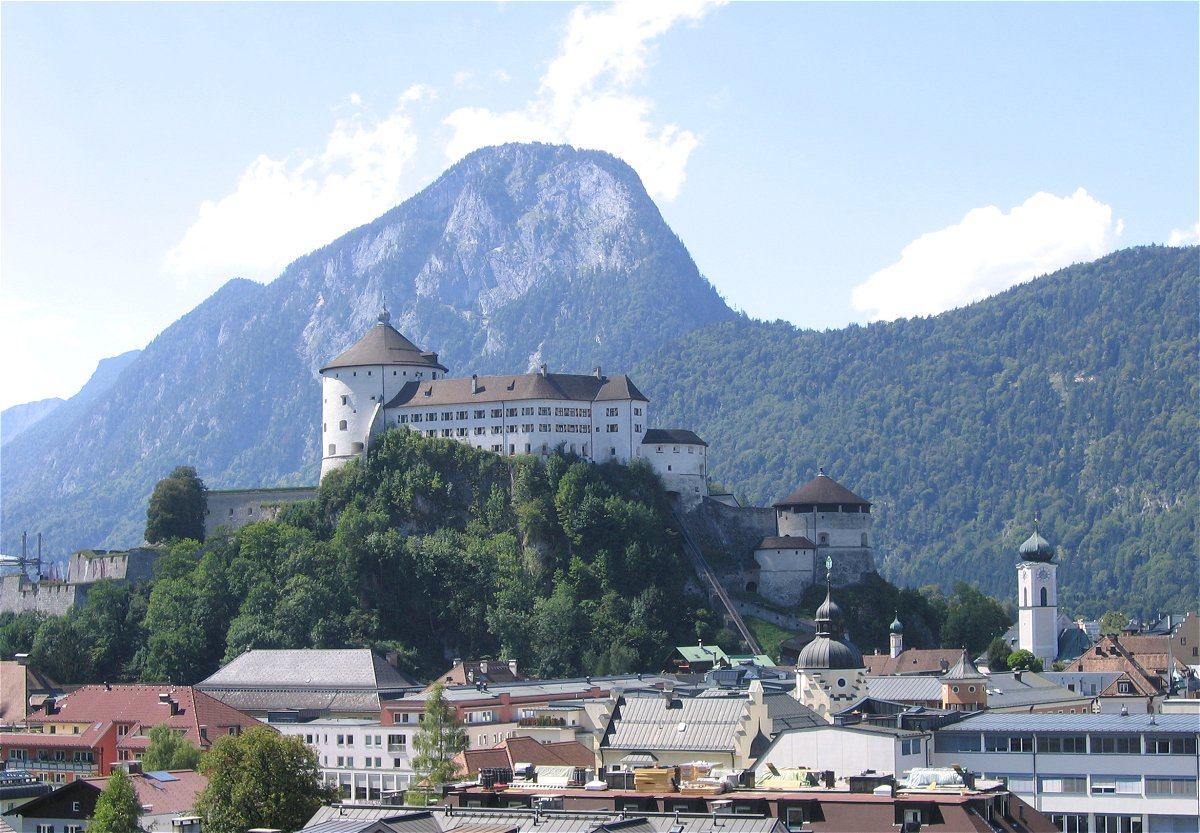
- Kufstein Fortress with Brandenberg Alps in the background

- Coat of arms

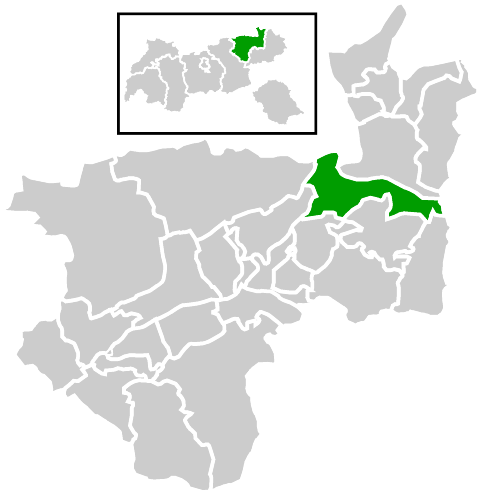
- Location within Kufstein district

- Location within Austria Location within Tyrol
- Coordinates: 47°35′00″N 12°10′00″E
- Country: Austria
- State: Tyrol
- District: Kufstein

Government
  - Mayor: Martin Krumschnabel (Independent)

Area
  - Total: 39.4 km^{2} (15.2 sq mi)
- Elevation: 499 m (1,637 ft)

Population (2023-01-01)
  - Total: 19,126
  - Density: 485/km^{2} (1,260/sq mi)
- Time zone: UTC+1 (CET)
  - Summer (DST): UTC+2 (CEST)
- Postal code: 6330-6333
- Area code: 05372
- Vehicle registration: KU
- Website: www.kufstein.at

Kufstein (German pronunciation: [ˈkʊfʃtaɪn]; Central Bavarian: Kufstoa) is a town in the Austrian state of Tyrol, the administrative seat of Kufstein District. With a population of about 20,000, it is the second largest Tyrolean town after the state capital Innsbruck. The greatest landmark is Kufstein Fortress, first mentioned in the 13th century. The town was the place of origin of the Austrian noble family Kuefstein.

== Geography ==
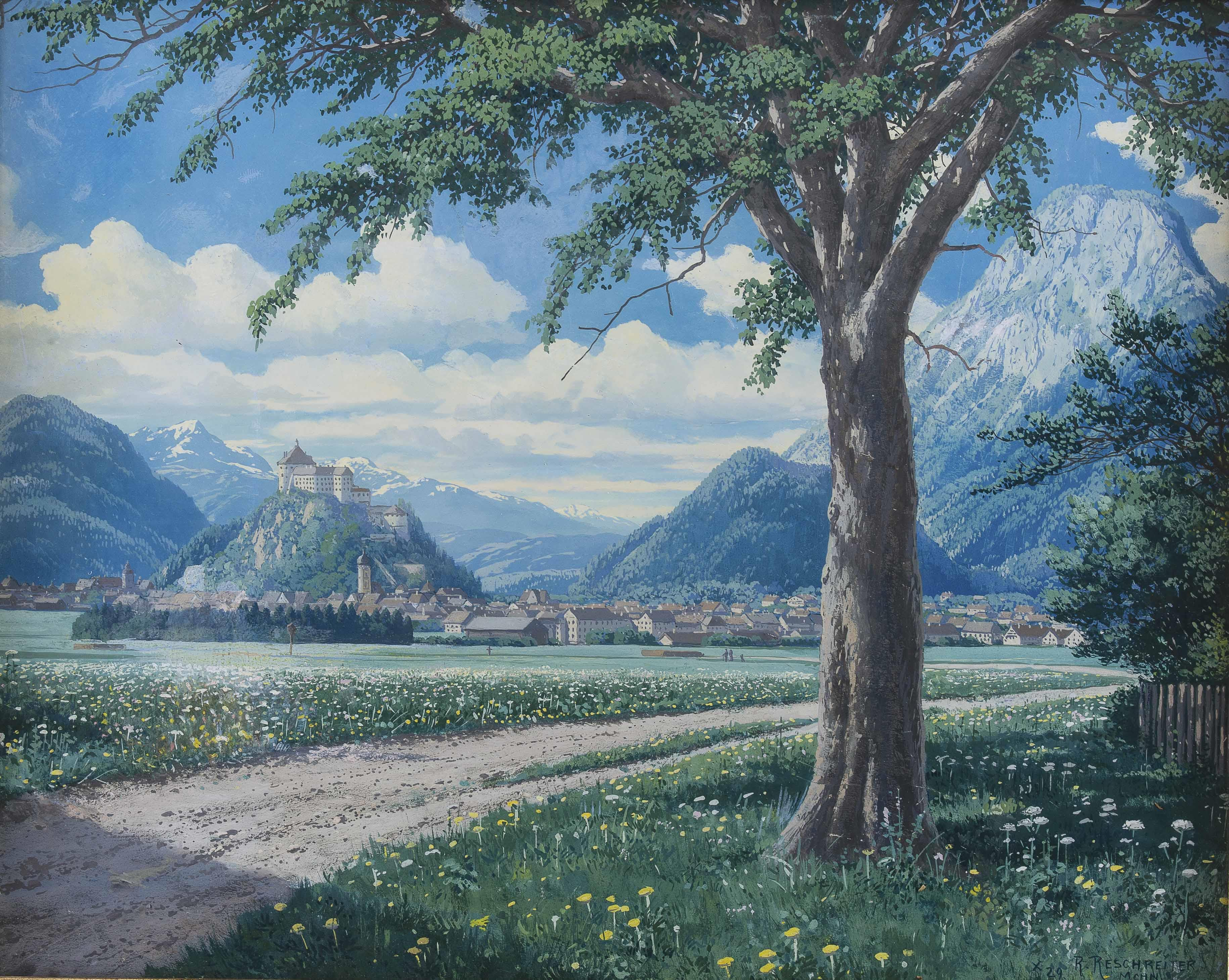
Blick auf Kufstein mit der Festung by Rudolf Reschreiter, circa 1929

It is located in the Tyrolean Unterland region on the river Inn, at the confluence with its Weißache and Kaiserbach tributaries, near the border with Bavaria, Germany. The municipal area stretches along the Lower Inn Valley between the Brandenberg Alps in the northwest and the Kaiser Mountains in the southeast. The remote Kaisertal until recently was the last settled valley in Austria without transport connections, prior to the completion of a tunnel road from Kufstein to neighbouring Ebbs in 2008. North of the town, the Inn river leaves the Northern Limestone Alps and enters the Bavarian Alpine Foreland. The town area comprises several small lakes, such as Pfrillsee, Längsee, and Hechtsee; Egelsee and Maistaller Lacke are protected nature reserves.

The municipal arrangement comprises the cadastral communities of Kufstein, Morsbach and Thierberg; the town itself is divided into five quarters (Zentrum, Sparchen, Weissach, Endach, and Zell).

== History ==
Archaeological findings in the Tischofer Cave in Kaisertal denote a settlement of the area more than 30,000 years ago, the oldest traces of human habitation in Tyrol. Incorporated into the Roman Empire in 15 BC, the Inn river formed the border between the Roman provinces of Raetia and Noricum.

A church at Caofstein was first mentioned in a 788 deed issued by Bishop Arno of Salzburg. At that time, the Lower Inn Valley was part of the Bavarian realm under the Agilolfing duke Tassilo III, who was deposed by Charlemagne and replaced by Prefect Gerold. The Fortress is first documented in 1205 as a possession of the Bishop of Regensburg and the Duke of Bavaria.

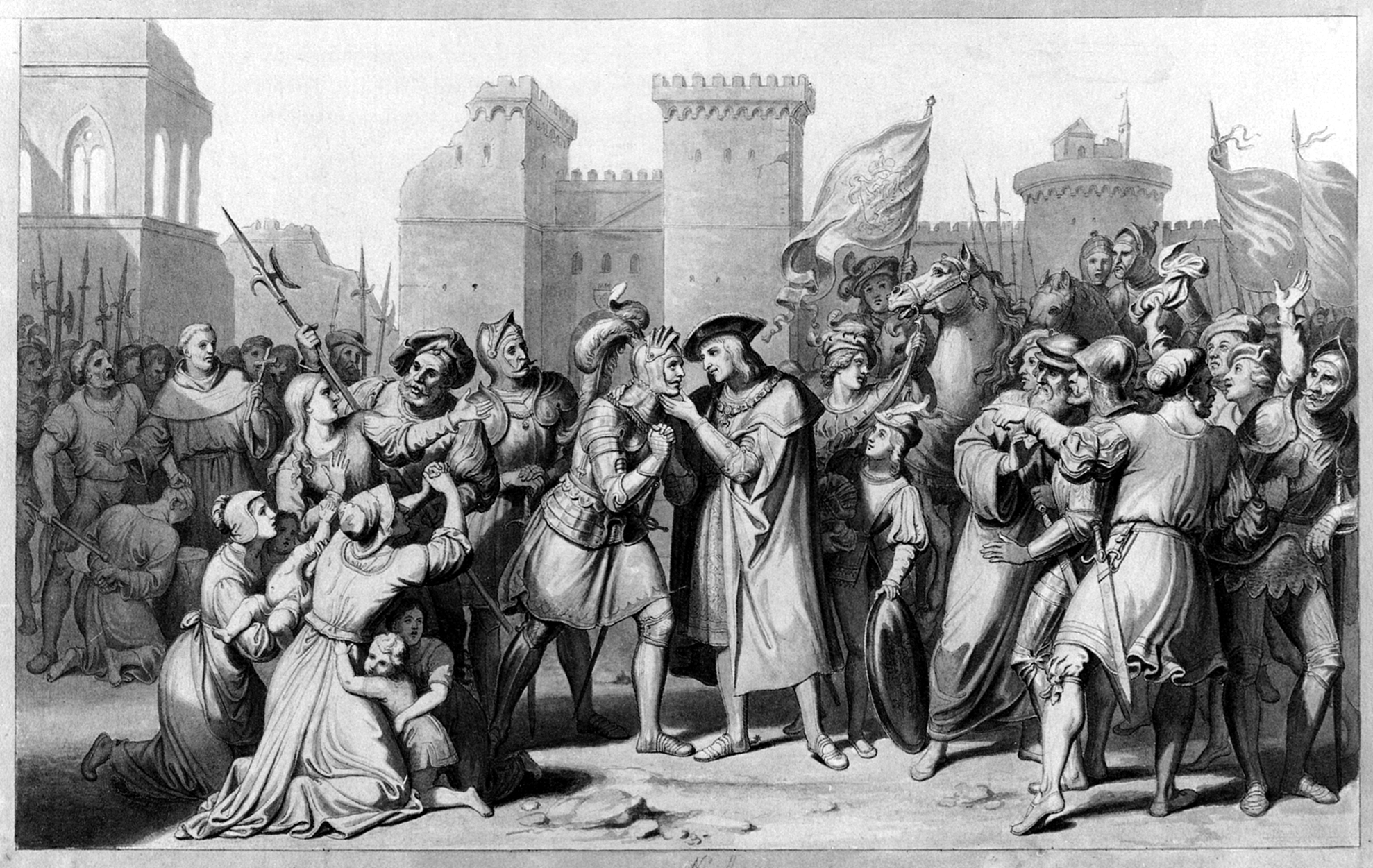
Emperor Maximilian entering Kufstein, 1836 drawing

In the early 14th century, the Wittelsbach emperor Louis IV, also Bavarian duke, vested the Kufstein citizens with rights of jurisdiction. Kufstein passed to the County of Tyrol in 1342, when it was a wedding gift to Countess Margaret from her husband, Emperor Louis's son Louis the Brandenburger. However, it fell back to Bavaria upon Margaret's death in 1369. Duke Stephen III of Bavaria granted Kufstein city status in 1393, due to its prominence as a trading and docking point on the Inn River. From 1415 onwards, his son and successor Duke Louis VII had the Fortress largely rebuilt and expanded.

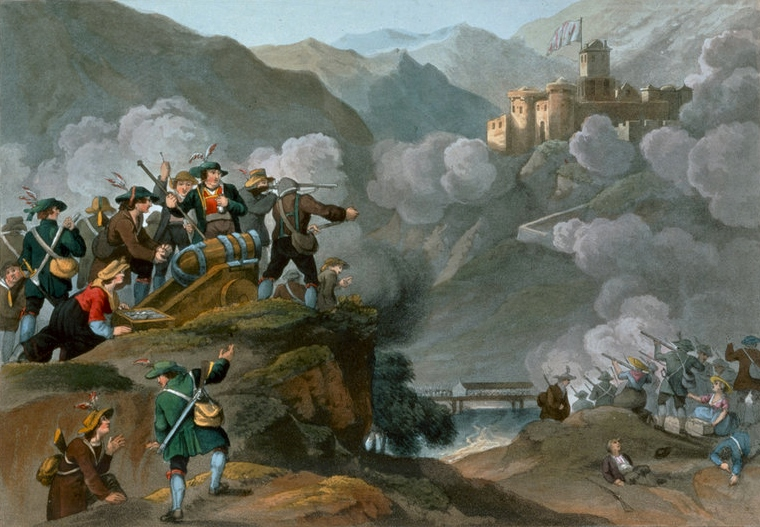
The Siege of the Kufstein Fortress in 1809

The possession of the strategically important Kufstein border fortress remained disputed. In 1504, the Habsburg emperor Maximilian I took the opportunity of the War of the Succession of Landshut within the Bavarian Wittelsbach dynasty: his Austrian forces laid siege to the town, and at the Imperial Diet in Cologne the next year, the emperor resolved upon the cession of the Kufstein territories to the Habsburg lands of Tyrol. Maximilian had the prominent Kaiserturm tower of the fortress erected, which was finished in 1522.

During the War of the Spanish Succession, the castle was again besieged by Bavarian troops under Elector Maximilian II Emanuel in 1703, nevertheless the Austrian domains were confirmed by the Treaty of Ilbersheim the next year. After the War of the Third Coalition, Kufstein once again was awarded to the newly established Kingdom of Bavaria in the 1805 Peace of Pressburg and the Tyrolean Rebellion of 1809 was crushed by the Bavarian Army. Finally in 1813/14 it passed to the Austrian Empire.

In the 19th century, Kufstein Fortress was turned into a bastille for political prisoners, such as the Hungarian outlaw Sándor Rózsa, who spent several years here before he was finally pardoned in 1868. The town's economic development was decisively promoted by the opening of the Lower Inn Valley Railway line in 1858.

In the late days of World War II the historic town centre suffered from Allied bombing. After the war, Kufstein was occupied by French and US forces; it was the site of a French sector United Nations Relief and Rehabilitation Administration Displaced Persons camp.

== Demographics ==
Historical population
Year	Pop.	±%
1869	2,777	—
1880	3,787	+36.4%
1890	4,067	+7.4%
1900	4,791	+17.8%
1910	6,717	+40.2%
1923	7,103	+5.7%
1934	7,551	+6.3%
1939	8,233	+9.0%
1951	11,268	+36.9%
1961	11,215	−0.5%
1971	12,913	+15.1%
1981	13,118	+1.6%
1991	13,484	+2.8%
2001	15,358	+13.9%
2011	17,388	+13.2%
2021	19,512	+12.2%
2026	20,124	+3.1%

Largest groups of foreign residents
Nationality	Population (2026)
Germany	1,442
Turkey	831
Croatia	499
Romania	383
Italy	330
Bosnia and Herzegovina	323
Syria	304
Serbia	303
Hungary	269
Afghanistan	159
Ukraine	158
Kosovo	117
Poland	107
Slovakia	97
Iraq	77
Russian Federation	68
Bulgaria	67
Iran	46
Czech Republic	35
Slovenia	31
North Macedonia	14

== Politics ==
The municipal council (Gemeinderat) consists of 21 members. Following the 2022 Tyrolean Local Elections, the seat distribution is as follows:

- The Independents (PF): 8 seats
- The Greens - The Green Alternative (GRÜNE): 3 seats
- Shared List of Kufstein (GKL): 2 seats
- People - Freedom - Fundamental Rights (MFG): 2 seats
- The City (DIESTADT): 2 seats
- NEOS - The New Austria (NEOS): 1 seat
- Freedom Party of Austria (FPÖ): 1 seat
- Social Democratic Party of Austria (SPÖ): 1 seat
- Austrian People's Party (ÖVP): 1 seat

The current mayor of Kufstein, Martin Krumschnabel (Independent), has been re-elected in 2022.

=== Twin towns - Sister cities ===
Kufstein is twinned with

- Frauenfeld, Switzerland
- Rovereto, Italy
- Langenlois, Austria

== Culture ==
=== Film and television ===
Locations in and around Kufstein have been used for a number of films and television programmes: Destiny (1942), Mountain Crystal (1949), Bluebeard (1951), White Shadows (1951), Das letzte Aufgebot (1953), The Flying Classroom (1954), Graf Porno und die liebesdurstigen Töchter (1969), Vanessa (1977), Sachrang (1978), TV documentary series Bilderbuch Deutschland (1996), Da wo das Glück beginnt (2006), Da wo es noch Treue gibt (2006), and Da wo die Freundschaft zahlt (2007). For further information see the Internet Movie Database.

=== Music ===
The song Kufsteinlied (also called Das Kufsteiner Lied), originally composed by Karl Ganzer, has been covered by many musicians including Heino and Franzl Lang.

== Infrastructure ==
=== Economy ===
Glass manufacturer Riedel, haulage contractor LKW Walter, gunmaker Voere, and textile mat manufacturer Kleen-Tex are based in Kufstein.

Kufstein is also home to the University of Applied Sciences Kufstein which specializes in providing business education and is a centre for international exchange.

=== Transport ===
Kufstein has two exits along the A12 motorway (autobahn) from Innsbruck to Rosenheim.

Kufstein railway station, opened in 1876, forms part of the Lower Inn Valley railway section of the Brenner-axis from Munich to Verona.

The Festungsbahn is a funicular that links the city centre with the Kufstein Fortress

The nearest airports are Innsbruck Airport, located 80 km (50 mi) south west, Salzburg Airport, located 97 km (60 mi) north east and Munich Airport, located 182 km (113 mi) north west of the town.

== Main sights ==
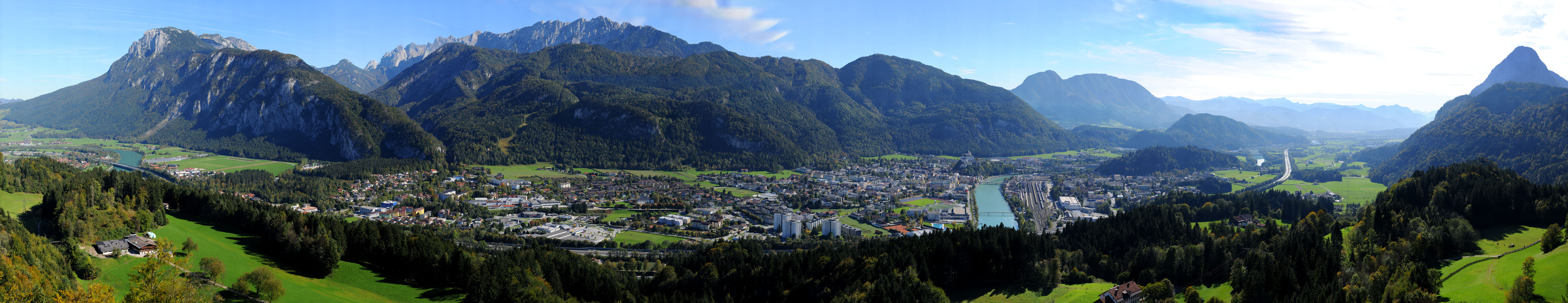
Panoramic view of Kufstein

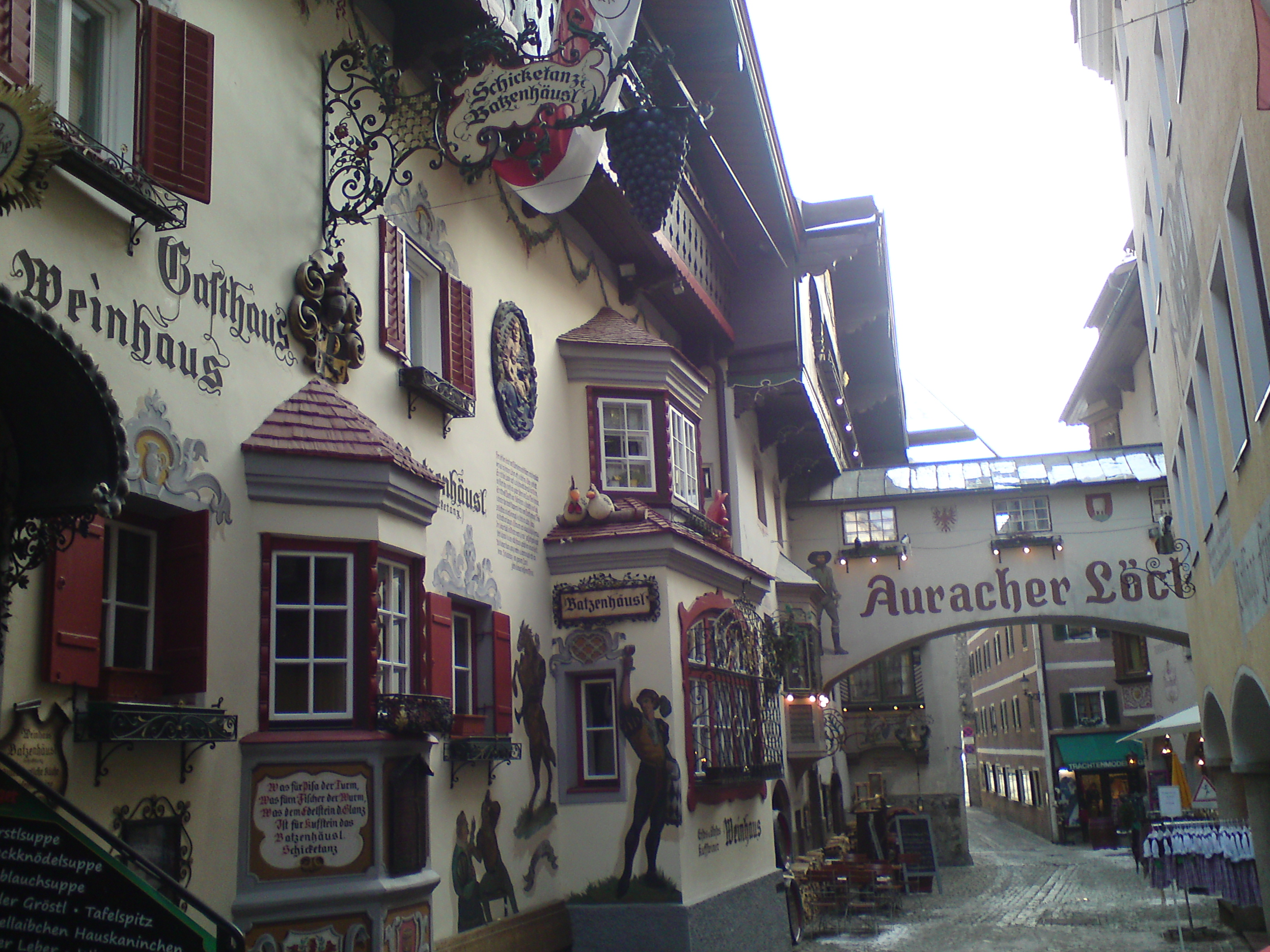
Architectural style typical for Tirol

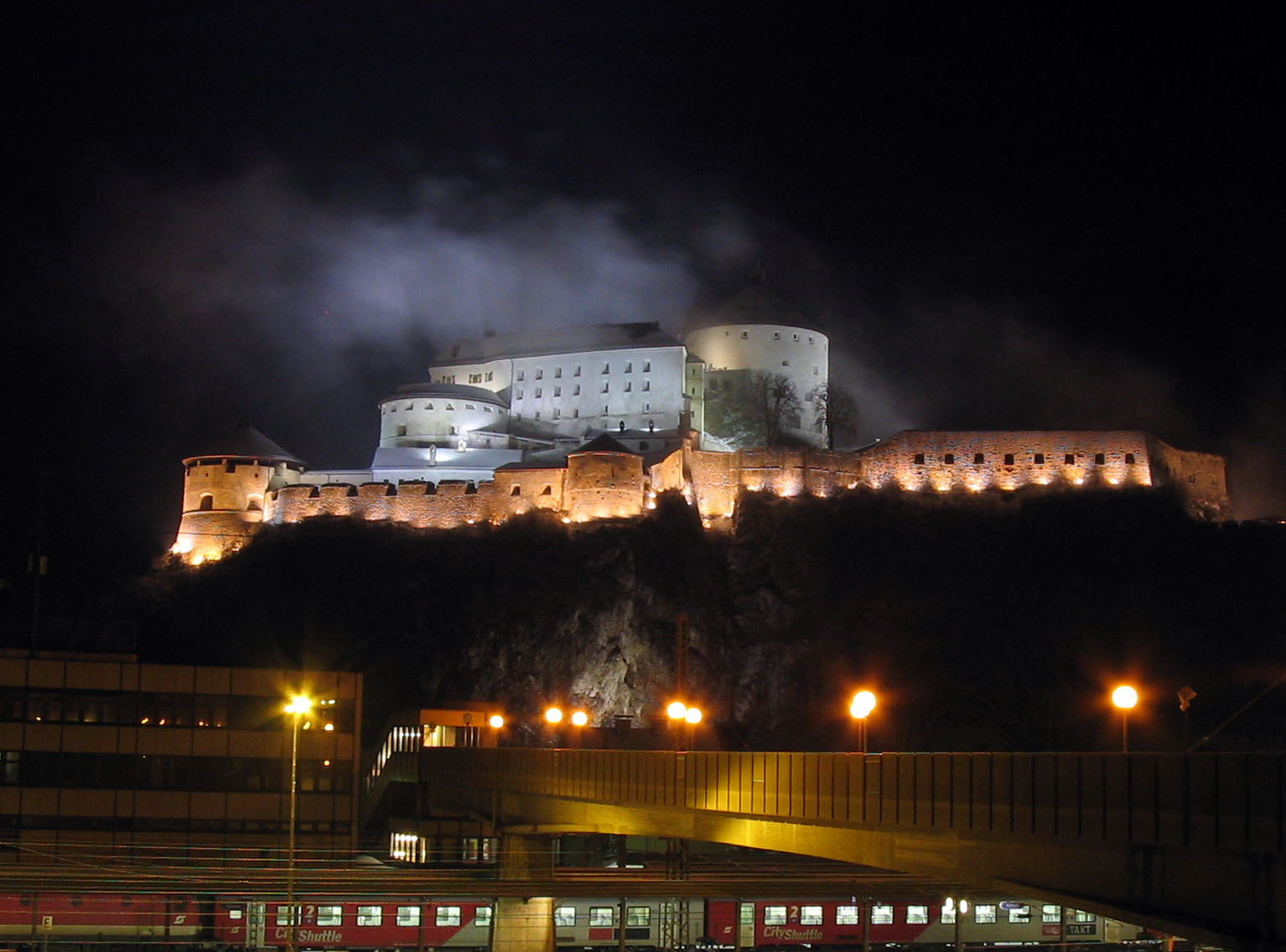
Kufstein Fortress

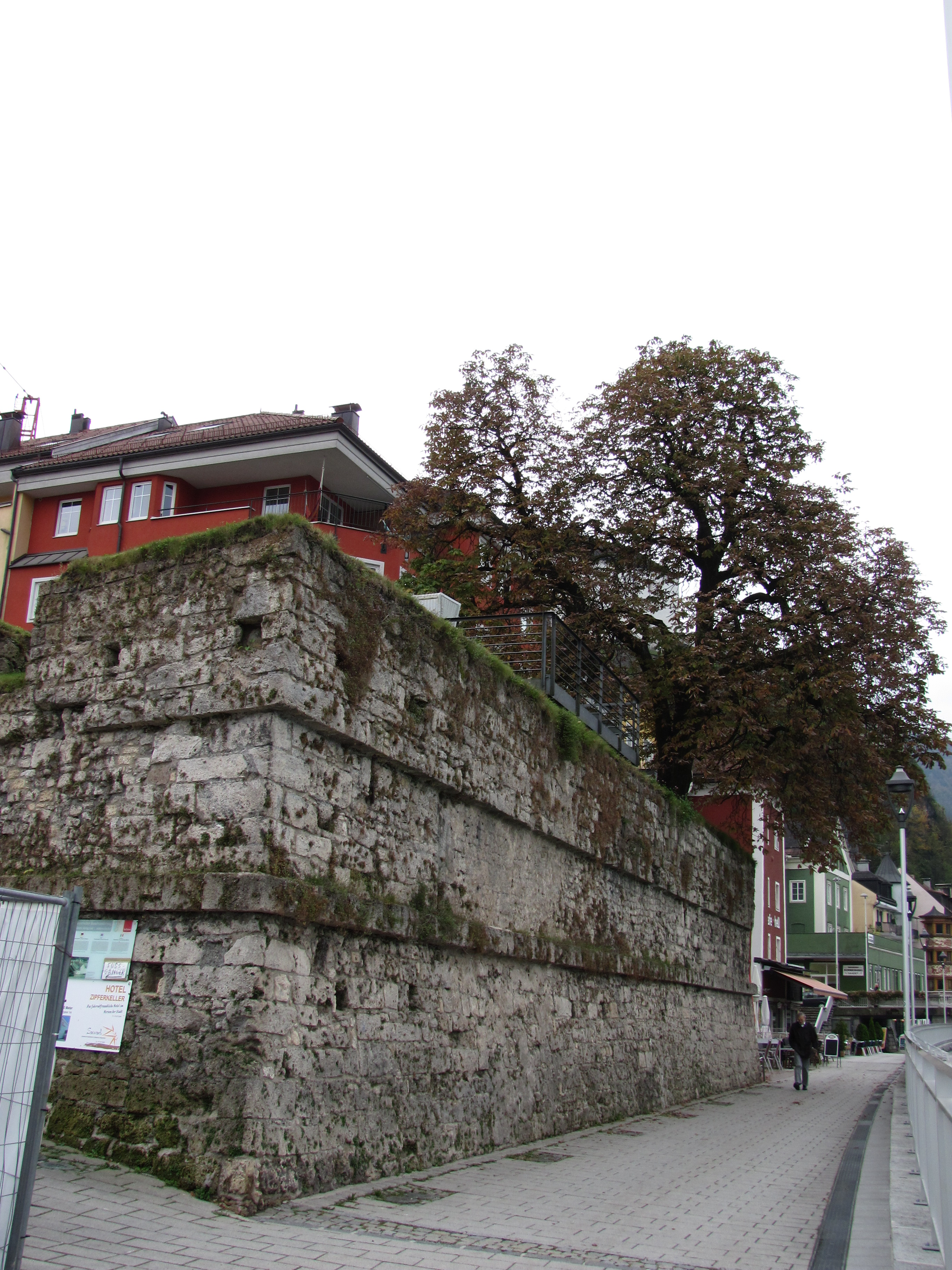
Wasserbastion, a part of the medieval wall

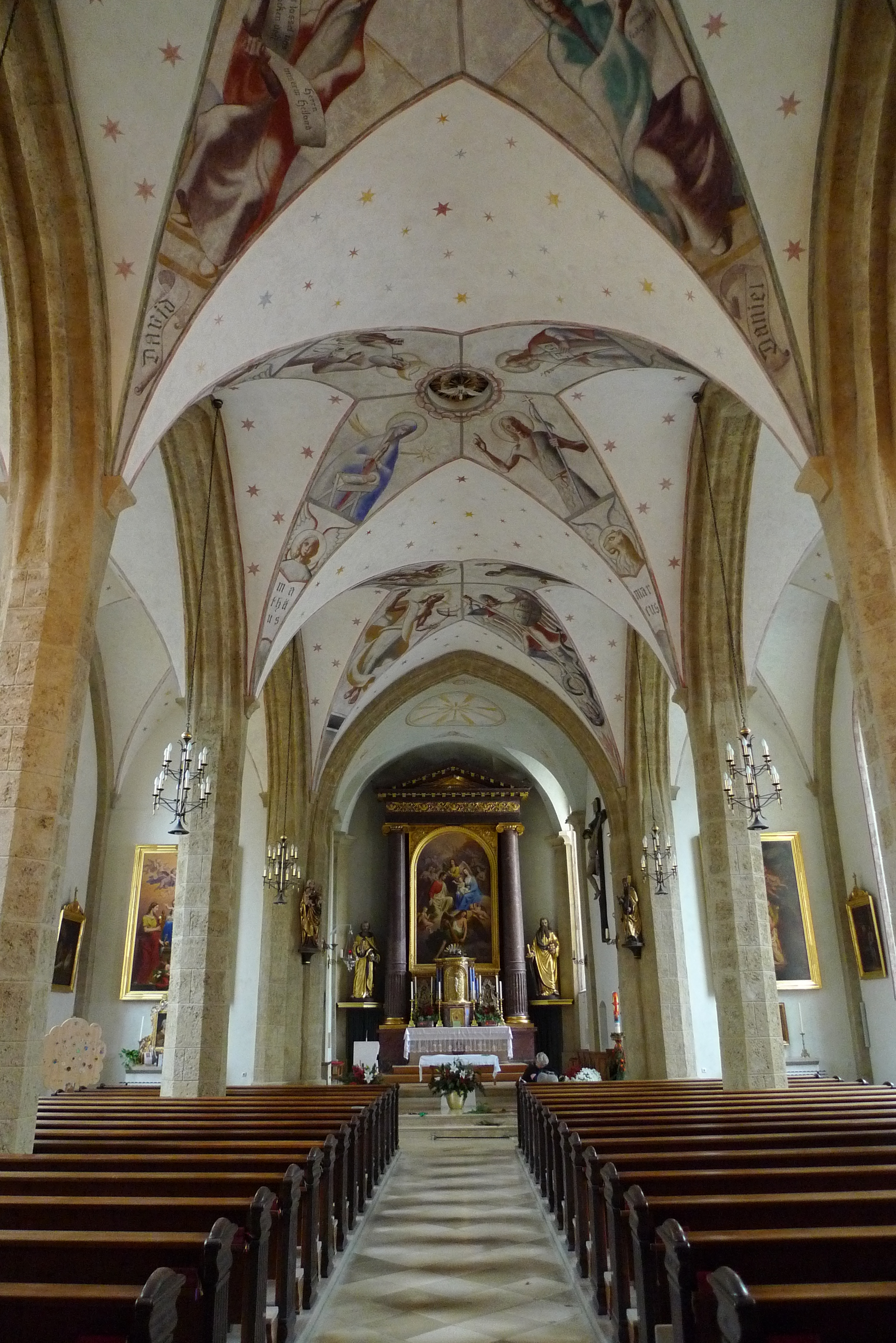
Saint Vitus Church.

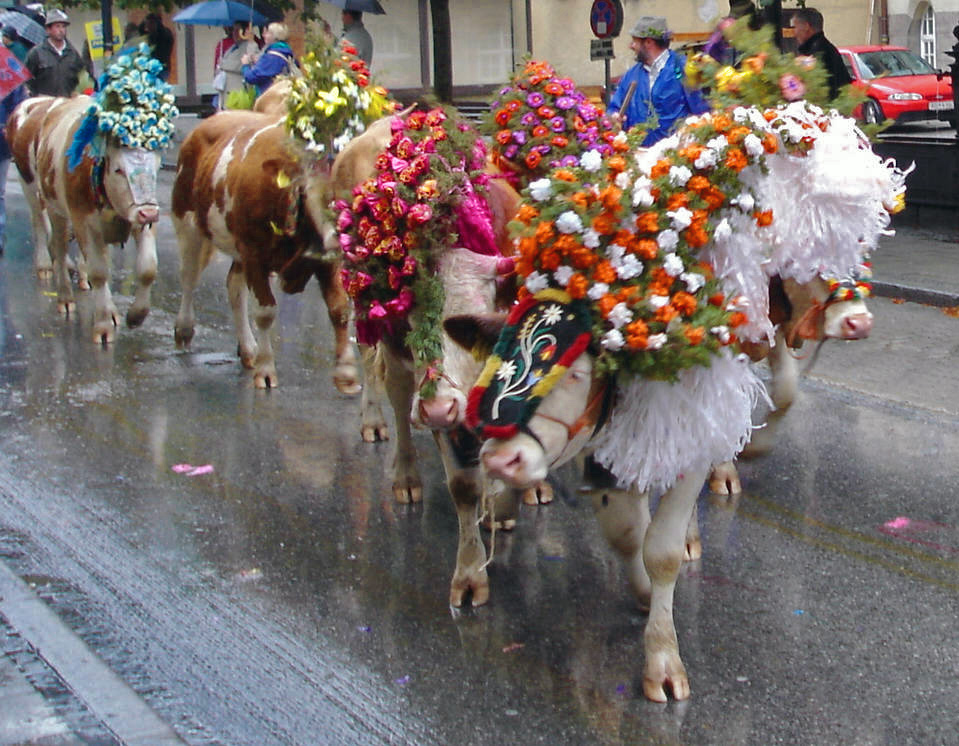
Annual Almabtrieb "Umzug" in Kufstein

Due to its long history, the city of Kufstein has various sights to offer:

- The Fortress (Festung) is built on a rock the height of which amounts to 90 metres (300 feet). Sometimes erroneously called Schloss Garoldseck, the fortress was mentioned as Castrum Caofstein in a document for the first time in 1205. It was enlarged several times. The most important tower, the round and impressive Kaiserturm, was built from 1518 to 1522. Several times in its history, the fortress was used as a prison. Today it is famous for its large organ (Heldenorgel).
- The old city centre (Altstadt) with several picturesque lanes the most famous of which is Römerhofgasse.
- The sightworthy City Hall (Rathaus) is on a square called Stadtplatz.
- Saint Vitus Church is the oldest church of Kufstein. It was built from 1390 to 1420 in a typical Gothic style. Later, it was converted into a baroque church from 1660 to 1661.
- A part of the medieval city wall is well preserved and worth a visit. The sightworthy Wasserbastei is in the Northern part of the old city centre on the river Inn. In the Southern part of the wall, a former gate called Auracher Löchl can be seen.

== Notable people ==
- Josef Madersperger (1768–1850), tailor and one of the inventors of the sewing machine
- Norbert Pfretzschner (1850–1927), an Austrian sculptor and author of books on hunting
- Adele Stürzl (1892–1944), communist and resistance fighter against National Socialism, lived locally.
- Max Reisch (1912–1985), Orient-researcher and writer
- Claus Josef Riedel (1925–2004), entrepreneur and glass designer
- Cornelius Rost (1919–1983), Wehrmacht officer, template for the novel As far as your feet will carry
- Günter Pichler (born 1940), musician and professor
- Leslie H. Sabo Jr. (1948–1970), US-soldier, Medal of Honor recipient
- Armin Kircher (1966–2015), church musician and composer

=== Sport ===
- Christian Pravda (1927–1994), alpine skier, bronze and silver medallist at the 1952 Winter Olympics
- Franz Schuler (born 1962), biathlete, 2nd at the Biathlon World Championships 1986
- Manfred Linzmaier (born 1962), footballer and team manager, played 390 games and 25 for Austria
- Markus Kronthaler (1967–2006), mountaineer and climber
- Karl Wendlinger (born 1968), racecar and Formula One driver
- Claus Dalpiaz (born 1971), ice hockey goaltender
- Christian Planer (born 1975), sport shooter and bronze medallist at the 2004 Summer Olympics.
- Martin Wildauer (born 1987), an Austrian strongman competitor
- Nicole Billa (born 1996), a footballer who has played over 180 games and 88 for Austria women
