= Thierberg =

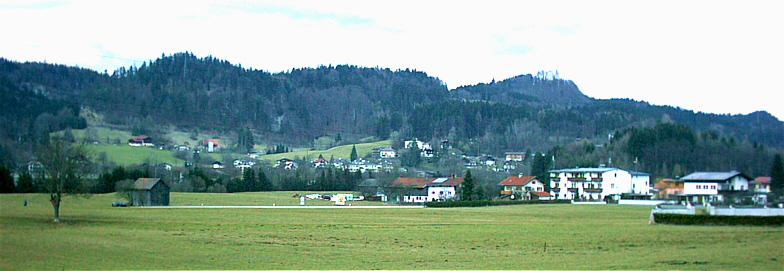

Highest point
- Elevation: 760 m (2,490 ft)
- Coordinates: 47°36′00″N 12°09′52″E

Geography
- Location within Bavaria
- Location: Bavaria, Germany

Thierberg is a mountain located in the north and southwest of the town of Kiefersfelden and thus extends over the border between Austria and Germany and it extends up to Bavaria, Germany but the most part is in Tyrol. In the not-too-high mountain, the Inn Valley is located at approximately 500 meters above sea level. There are several lakes: Egelsee, Hechtsee and Längsee.

Thierberg mountain is named after the village and cadastral community "Thierberg" .

On the mountain, the Thierberg castle (721 m.a.s.l) is one of the popular pilgrimage destination of the mountain that was built approximately 1280 A.C.

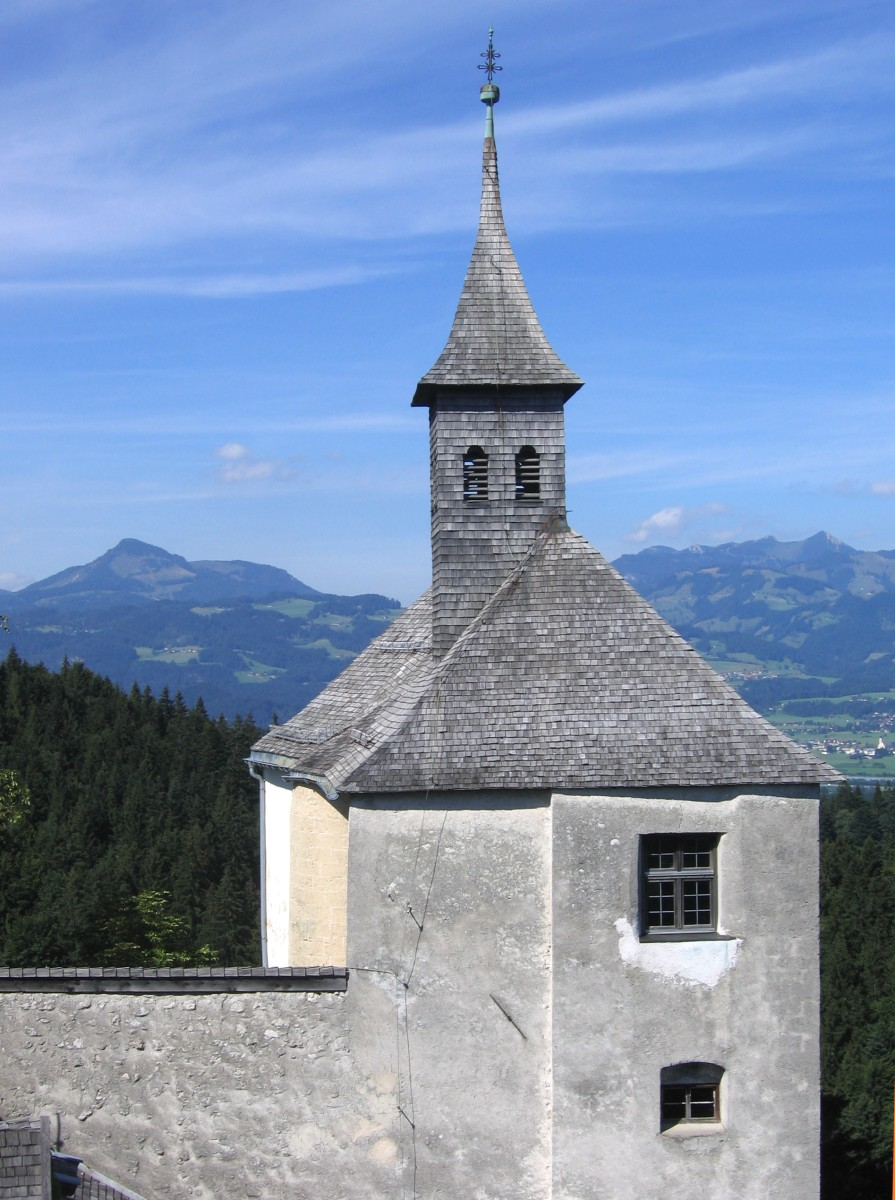
Theirberg chapel in the background is Spitzstein (left) and Geigelstein.

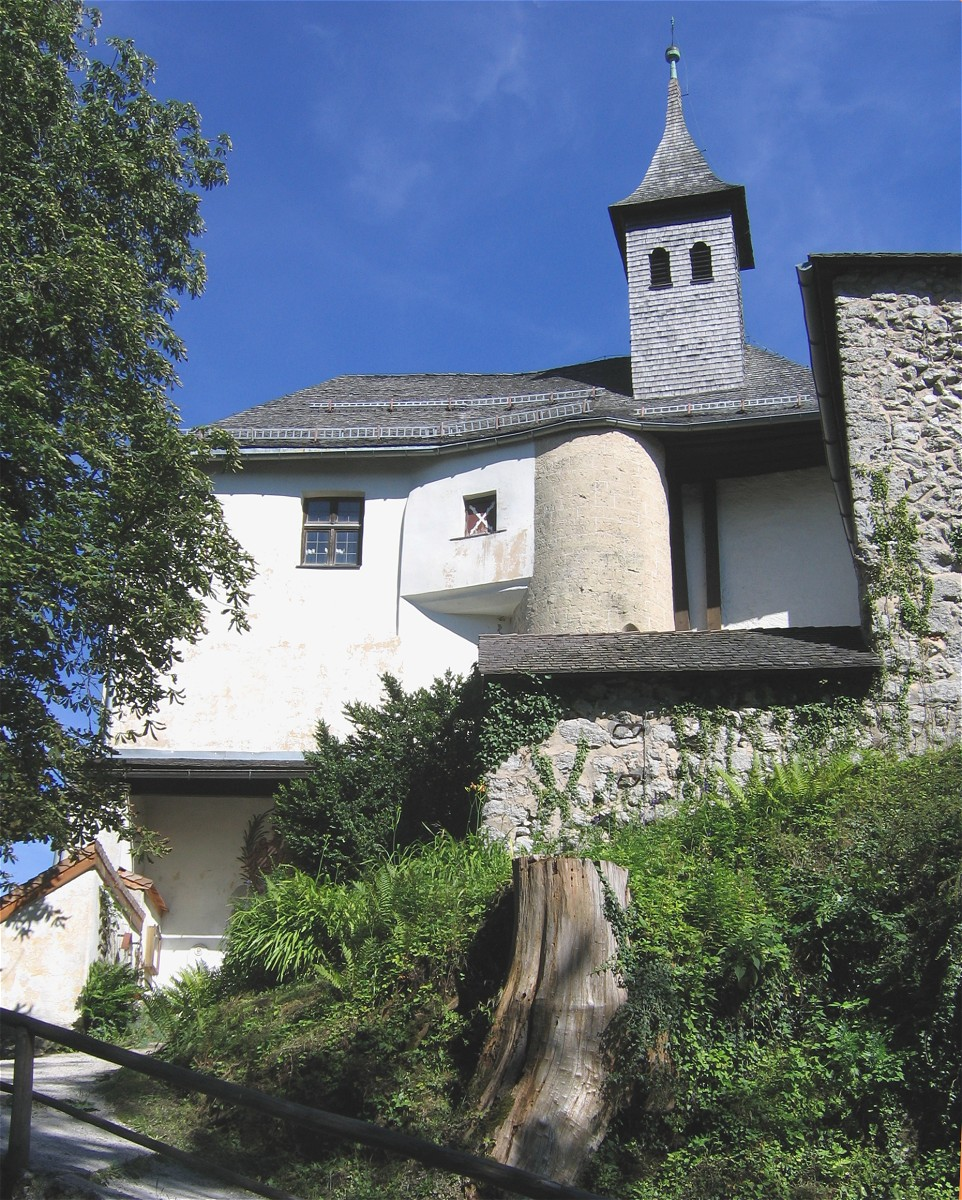
Theirberg chapel (inside).

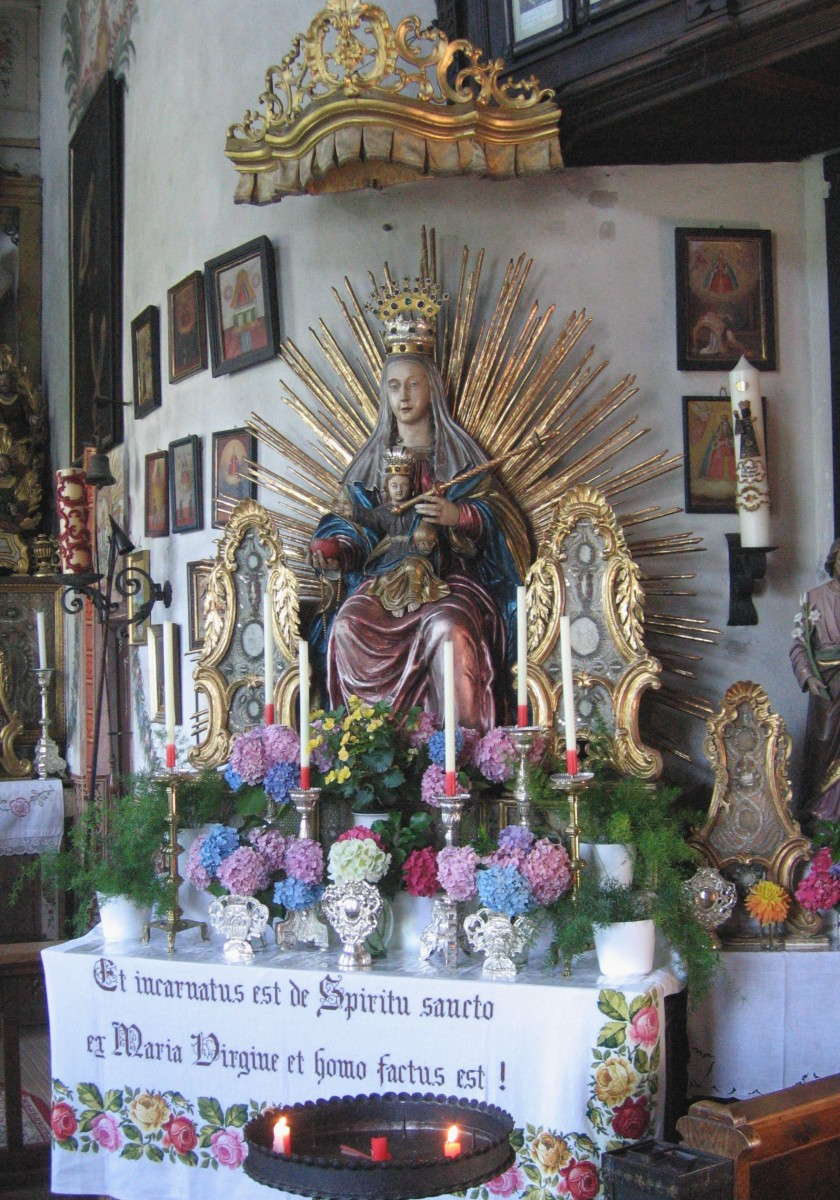
An altar at Theirberg chapel.

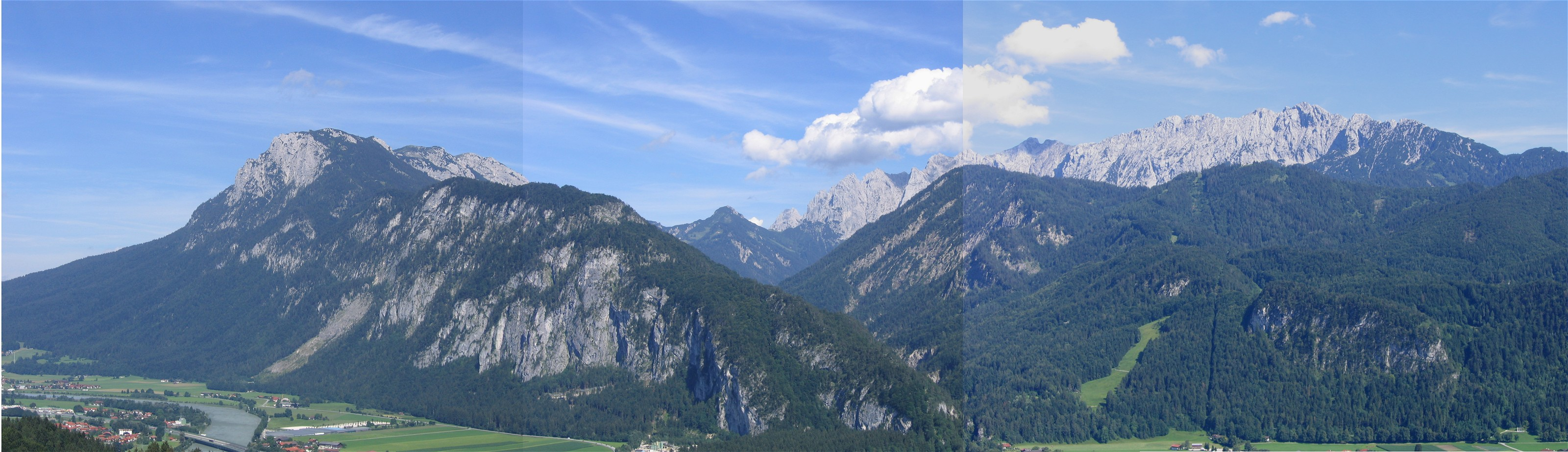
Kaiser Mountains seen from Thierberg.
