= Albert Jesionek =

German dermatologist (1870–1935)

Albert Jesionek (9 January 1870 in Lindau – 8 December 1935 in Giessen) was a German dermatologist.

He studied medicine at Kiel University, the University of Tübingen, and the Ludwig-Maximilians-Universität München, where in 1894 he received his doctorate. After graduation, he spent several years working as an assistant at the municipal hospital in Munich, and from 1900 served as a deputy senior physician at the dermatology clinic in Munich under Karl Posselt (1837–1916). In 1906, he became an associate professor, and later the same year relocated to the University of Giessen, where in 1913 he was appointed director of the Lupusheilstätte (sanatorium for lupus). In 1918, he was named a full professor of dermatology at the university.

He is remembered for his work involving light-therapy for the treatment of skin tuberculosis. He recognized the importance of early studies done by Joseph Doutrelepont and Niels Ryberg Finsen regarding light-therapy treatment for lupus and skin tuberculosis; and with Hermann von Tappeiner and Albert Jodlbauer at the Ludwig-Maximilians-Universität München, he had taken part in research of light from a biological standpoint. In 1910, he published a monograph on the latter subject titled "Lichtbiologie", followed by "Lichtbiologie und Lichtpathologie" two years later.

From 1920 onward, he was involved with issues such as the pathogenesis of skin tuberculosis, the curative effect of tuberculins and the treatment of skin tuberculosis from a dietary standpoint, namely the "Sauerbruch-Herrmannsdorfer-Gerson diet".

A specialized irradiation lamp known as a "Jesionek lamp" is named after him.

== Selected works ==
- Lichtbiologie : Die experimentellen Grundlagen der modernen Lichthandlung, 1910.
- Praktische Ergebnisse auf dem Gebiete der Haut- und Geschlechtskrankheiten (3 parts, 1910–14).
- Lichtbiologie und Lichtpathologie, 1912.
- Biologie der gesunden und kranken Haut, 1916.
- "Light as stimulus and its therapeutic indications" (published in English, 1926)
- Tuberkulose und Haut; eine biologische Studie, 1929
- Diätetische Behandlung der Hauttuberkulose und Ernährungsbiologie (with Lutz Bernhardt), 1930.
