= Maistaller Lacke =

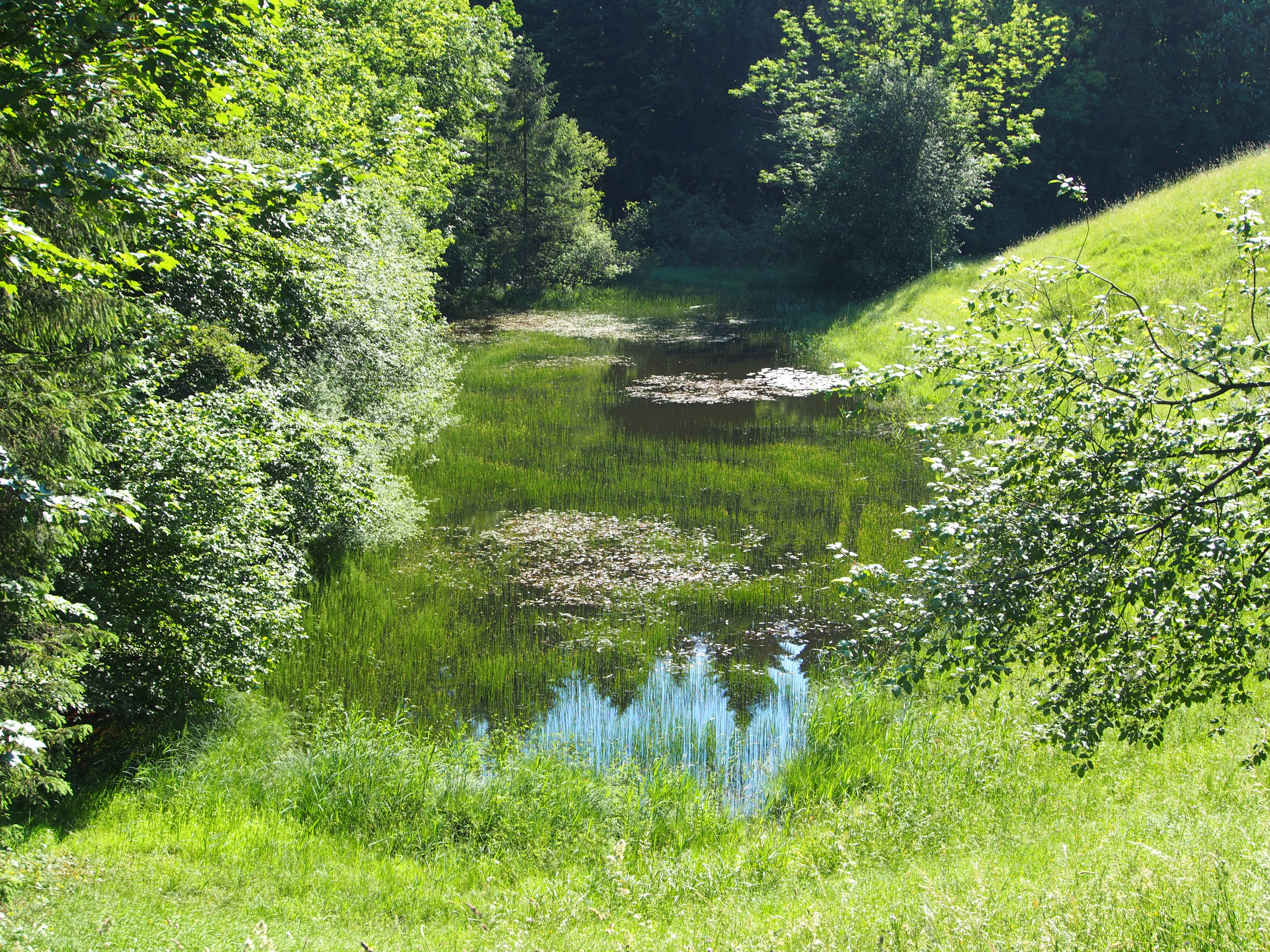
- The lake

- Location within Austria
- Location: Tyrol, Austria
- Coordinates: 47°35′08″N 12°09′28″E
- Type: lake

Maistaller Lacke is a lake of Tyrol, Austria. It is located approximately 1.5 kilometres (0.93 mi) from Kufstein town centre. The lake is part of Maistaller-Moore, a natural monument since 1957. Once used by a Kufstein brewery as an ice source to cool beer, it has since become overgrown.

== Geography ==
Zigeuner-Waldl is a small forest around 1.5 kilometres (0.93 mi) west of Kufstein town centre that contains Maistaller-Moore, a bog area that includes Maistaller Lacke. The bogs contain Sphagnum (bog moss), and in 1937 some contained more than 5 m (16 ft) of peat.

Maistaller Lacke was described as dystrophic by Stüber in 1949. The ancient river Inn created the depression containing the lake. In 1983, the lake was 60 metres (200 ft) long and 50 metres (160 ft) wide.

== History ==
Historical photos from 1902 and 1909 show that people once used Maistaller Lacke for boating. In winter, the Egger brewery in Kufstein collected ice from the lake to cool its beer. This ice harvesting helped control plant overgrowth, but stopped around 1955. Since then, the lake has filled in with overgrowth, and only around 3 m (9.8 ft) by 5 m (16 ft) of open water remained in 1985. The brewery continued to own the lake as of 1983.

Maistaller-Moore was proclaimed a natural monument in 1957. Human activity has threatened the area. High-voltage power lines were installed nearby in 1939 and 1967. Except for the trees surrounding the bogs and lake, much of the Zigeuner-Waldl was deforested in 1946. Gravel quarrying around the forest began around 1952; it filled bogland with overburden and lowered the water table. One raised bog was destroyed, and others have partially dried out. Some gravel pits were filled with waste from Kufstein and plastic from Kneissl's ski factory; the area also experienced extensive fly-tipping. As of 1983, gravel was being quarried south of the forest.

In 1983, Gerhard Lehmann proposed a staggered work plan to improve conditions in the lake. He suggested clearing sludge and overgrowth and cutting down spruce trees on the lake's southern side. Lehmann set up an organisation focused on preserving the lake in 1985. Philipp Larch took responsibility for overseeing the lake's conservation in 2016; he later planned to survey amphibians.

In 2016, Martin Krumschnabel, the mayor of Kufstein, opposed building a road that would bypass the town; one reason was that it would threaten the biotope of the lake.

== Ecology ==
Researchers recorded dragonflies at the lake and surrounding bogs from 1920 to 1933 and again from 1977 to 1981. The initial survey identified 27 species in the area, with 19 at the lake. The second survey found only 10 species remaining at the lake.
