= Längsee (Tyrol) =

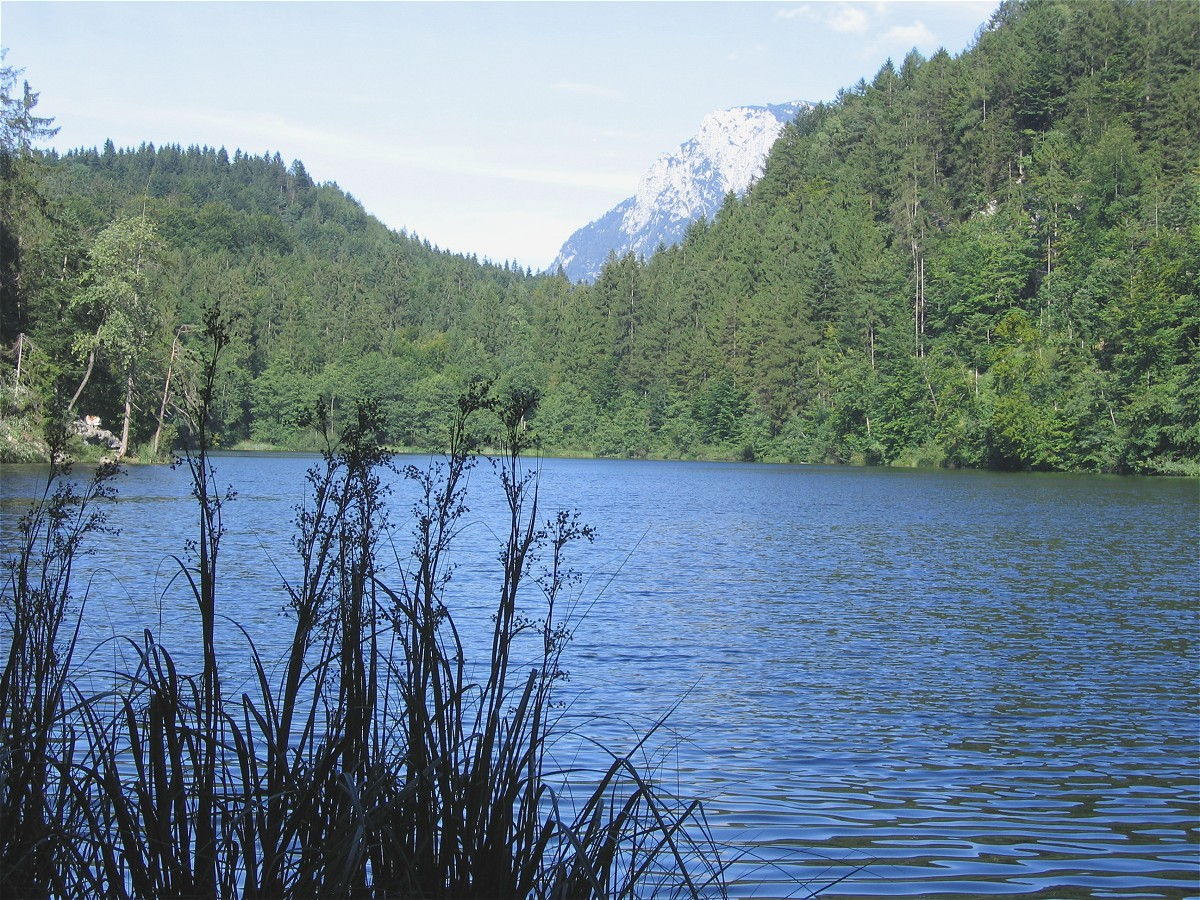
- Lake Längsee

- Location within Austria
- Location: Tyrol, Austria
- Coordinates: 47°35′58″N 12°09′17″E
- Type: lake

Längsee is a lake of Tyrol, Austria.

== See also ==
- Egelsee (Tyrol)
- Hechtsee
