= Hermann von Tappeiner =

German pharmacologist (1847–1927)

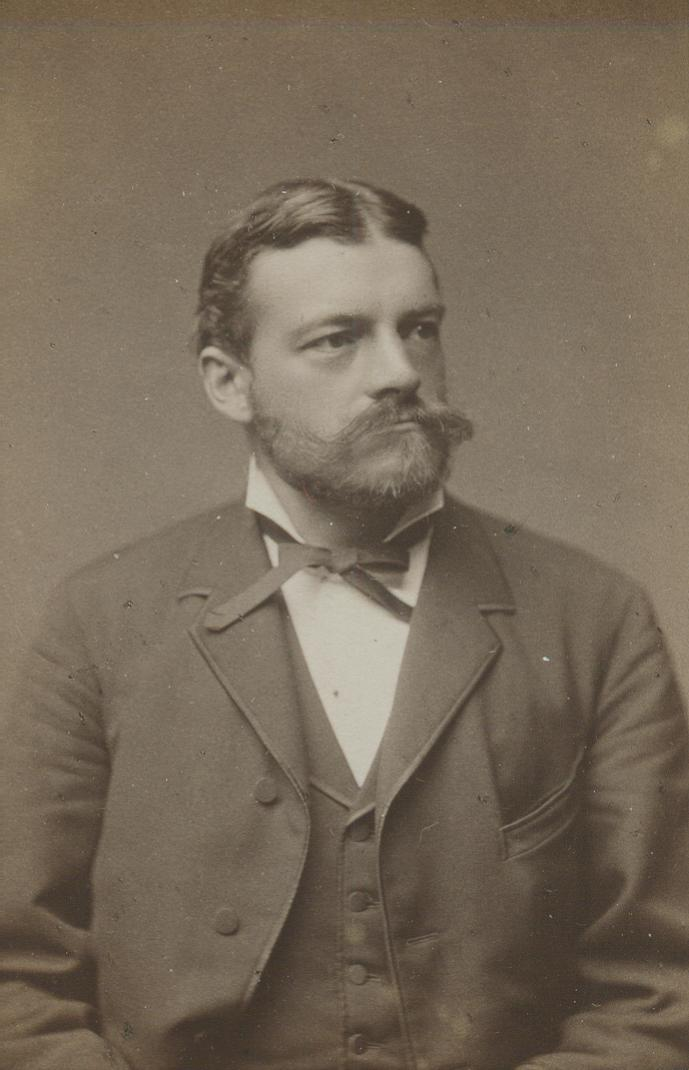
Hermann von Tappeiner

Hermann von Tappeiner (18 November 1847 in Meran – 12 January 1927 in Munich) was an Austrian pharmacologist. He was the son of anthropologist Franz Tappeiner (1816–1902).

He studied at the University of Innsbruck, the University of Göttingen, Leipzig University, Heidelberg University, and the University of Tübingen, receiving his doctorate in 1872. As a student, his influences included Carl Ludwig and Gustav von Hüfner at Leipzig University, and Robert Bunsen at Heidelberg University. In 1877, he obtained his habilitation at the Ludwig-Maximilians-Universität München. Two years later, he began teaching classes in physiology and dietetics at the veterinary school in Munich, and in 1884 became an associate professor of medicinal chemistry and pharmacology at the Ludwig-Maximilians-Universität München. In 1893, he was named a full professor of pharmacology at the Ludwig-Maximilians-Universität München, where he was also head of the institute of experimental pharmacology.

In 1904, he coined the term "photodynamic reaction". He is credited as being the first to perform photodynamic therapy (PDT) in humans — beginning in 1903, with dermatologist Albert Jesionek, he conducted experiments via the topical application of photosensitive dye to various skin diseases, followed by exposure to a light source (sunlight or an arc lamp). Also, he eventually came to understand the necessary role that atmospheric oxygen played in the photodynamic process.

== Selected works ==
- Anleitung zu chemisch-diagnostischen Untersuchungen am Krankenbette (1885, 5th edition 1892); translated into English in 1898 as "Introduction to chemical methods of clinical diagnosis".
- Lehrbuch der Arzneimittellehre und Arzneiverordnungslehre unter besonderer Berücksichtigung der deutschen und österreichischen Pharmakopoe (1890, 15th edition 1922) – Textbook of materia medica and the medical regulation doctrine: with special consideration of German and Austrian pharmacopoeia.
- Die sensibilisierende Wirkung fluorescierender Substanzen; gesammelte Untersuchungen über die photodynamische Erscheinung (1907, with Albert Jodlbauer) – Sensitized fluorescent substances; collected research on the photodynamic phenomenon.
