= Albert Jodlbauer =

German pharmacologist and toxicologist

Albert Jodlbauer (April 27, 1871 in Munich – May 13, 1945 in Thierberg) was a German pharmacologist and toxicologist.

From 1891 to 1896 he studied medicine at the Ludwig-Maximilians-Universität München, where in 1896 he received his doctorate as a pupil of Otto Bollinger. Following his graduation, he worked as an assistant at the institute of pharmacology at the Ludwig-Maximilians-Universität München under the directorship of Hermann von Tappeiner. In 1908, he became an associate professor, and in 1914 was named departmental head of the pharmacological institute. From 1923 onward, he was a full professor of pharmacy and pharmacology at the veterinary faculty of the Ludwig-Maximilians-Universität München.

During the early years of the 20th century, with Tappeiner and Oscar Raab, he studied the physiological and pharmacological effects of light, and with Tappeiner, published a number of works on the concept of "photodynamic action". In this context, he discovered that the photosensitizing effect of fluorescent substances was dependent upon the presence of oxygen.

His other areas of research included hemolysis, especially by hypertonic solutions of neutral salts, the effect of oxalate and fluoride poisoning in the blood calcium and the pharmacological action of bitters.

== Selected works ==
- Über Resorption und Sekretion im Dünndarm bei Gegenwart gelöster Eiweißkörper sowie über die Wirkung von Bittermitteln auf den Dünndarm, habilitation thesis at the Ludwig-Maximilians-Universität München (1901) – On absorption and secretion in the small intestine in the presence of dissolved protein bodies and on the effect of bitters to the small intestine.
- Über die Wirkung der photodynamischen (fluorescierenden) Stoffe auf Protozoen und Enzyme (with H. Tappeiner), Deutsches Archiv für Klinische Medizin 80 (1904), 427-487 – On the effect of photodynamic (fluorescent) substances on protozoa and enzymes.
- Über die Beteiligung des Sauerstoffes bei der photodynamischen Wirkung fluoreszierender Stoffe (with H. Tappeiner), Münchener Medizinische Wochenschrift 52 (1904), 1139-1141 – On the role of oxygen in the photodynamic effect of fluorescent substances.
- Die sensibilisierende Wirkung fluorescierender Substanzen : Gesammelte Untersuchungen über die photodynamische Erscheinung (with H. Tappeiner), Leipzig (1907) – Sensitized fluorescent substances; collected research on the photodynamic phenomenon.
