= Franz Tappeiner =

Austrian physician and anthropologist

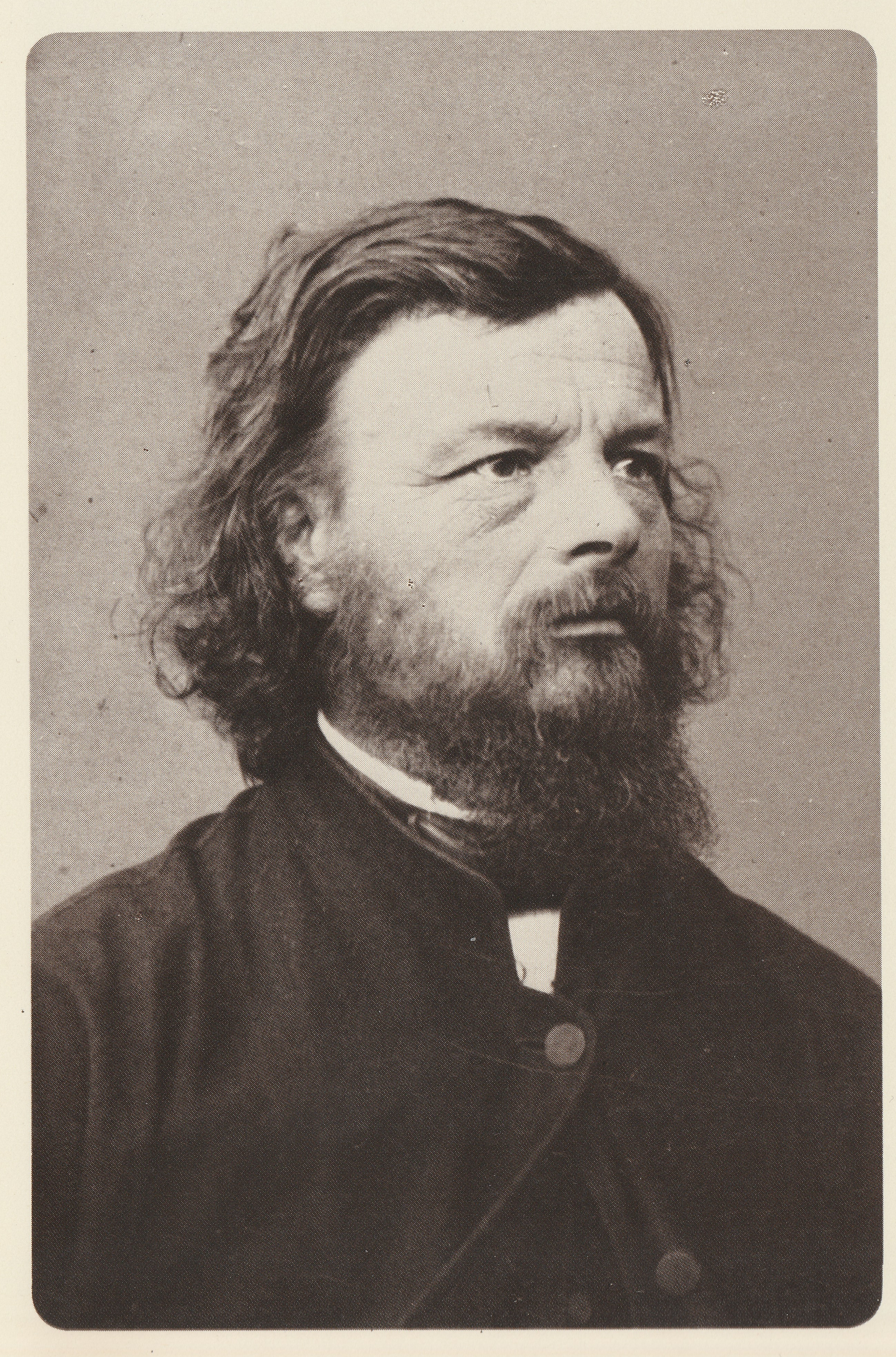
Franz Tappeiner

Franz Tappeiner, Edler von Tappein (7 January 1816, Laas – 20 August 1902, Meran) was an Austrian physician and anthropologist. He was the father of pharmacologist Hermann von Tappeiner.

He studied at the universities of Prague, Padua and Vienna, and afterwards he opened a medical practice in his hometown of Laas. Later on, he became a renowned physician in Meran, about which he advocated fresh-air therapy for tuberculosis patients and water treatments for sufferers of typhus.

Franz Tappeiner was born as the son of the Lorentzhof farmer Josef and his wife Katharina Lechthaler in Laas in Vinschgau. After attending the Benedictine high school in Merano, he completed a medical degree and received his doctorate in January 1843 in Vienna. Back in Laas, in the same year he helped, through his medical guidance, patients from all over the Habsburg monarchy and opened his first medical clinique as well as a pharmacy. In 1846 he moved to Merano where an year later, in 1847 he married Mathilde von Tschiderer born in Bolzano, Italy. They had two children: the future pharmacologist Hermann Von Tappeiner (1847–1927), and Hedwig (1849-1929). In 1848, after asking the "honest electors" not to be afraid of the Lutheran confession, he lost the election to the Frankfurt National Assembly and he devoted himself exclusively to his medical practice with the aim of further developing an appropriate sanitary infrastructure. This was only possible in 1850 where Tappeiner as well as physicians Gottlieb Putz and Hans Pircher founded the "Kurkomittee", later defined in 1855 as the "Kurverwaltung", an association of welfare involved in local politics and in the shaping of the Merano's welfare and sanitary regulations. It was in that same year that Tappeiner, owing to the cholera epidemic, was able to decrease the spreading of infections among the townspeople by explaining the compulsory precautions citizens needed to take in order to stay safe. This gave the physician fame as well as eagerness to continue his scientific discoveries using animals as means. Many of this experiments were carried in the Anatomical and Pathological Institute of Munich and assisted by the famous pathologist Rudolf Virchow in the "charité" situated in Berlino. In 1878 after the death of his wife he turned to anthropology. A skull collection created by him is now in the Natural History Museum in Vienna.In 1898, Emperor Franz Joseph bestowed on him the inheritable title of noble "von Tappein" and on August 19, 1902, Tappeiner died at his residence, the Reichenbach residence, in Obermais.

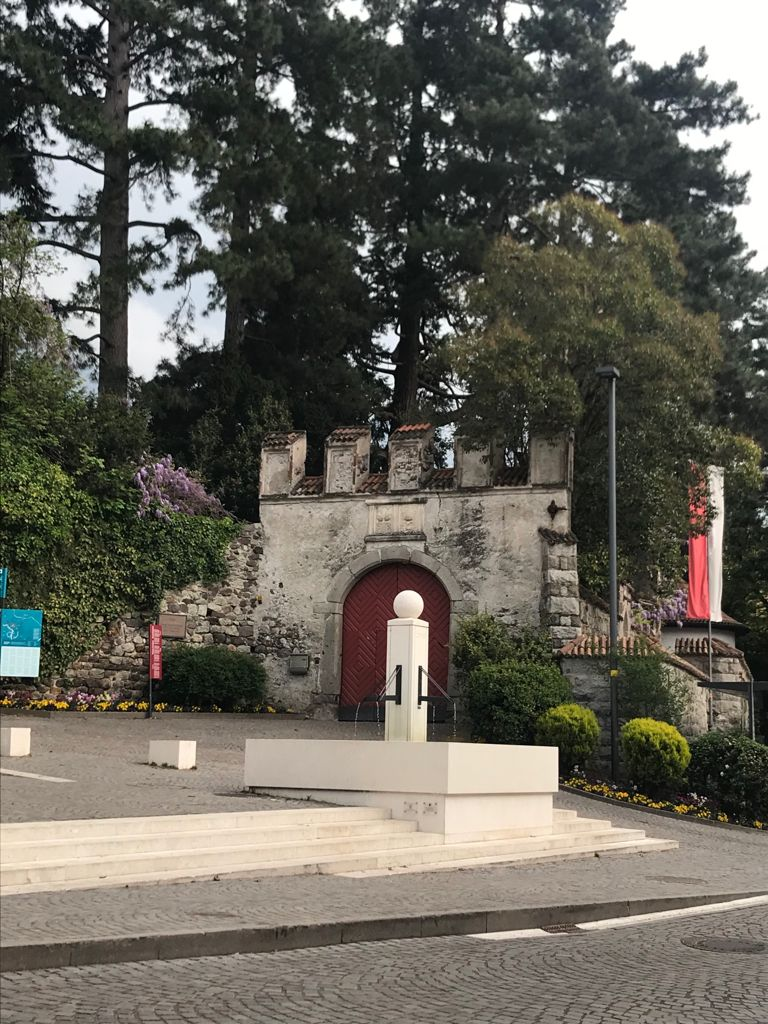
Home of Tappeiner

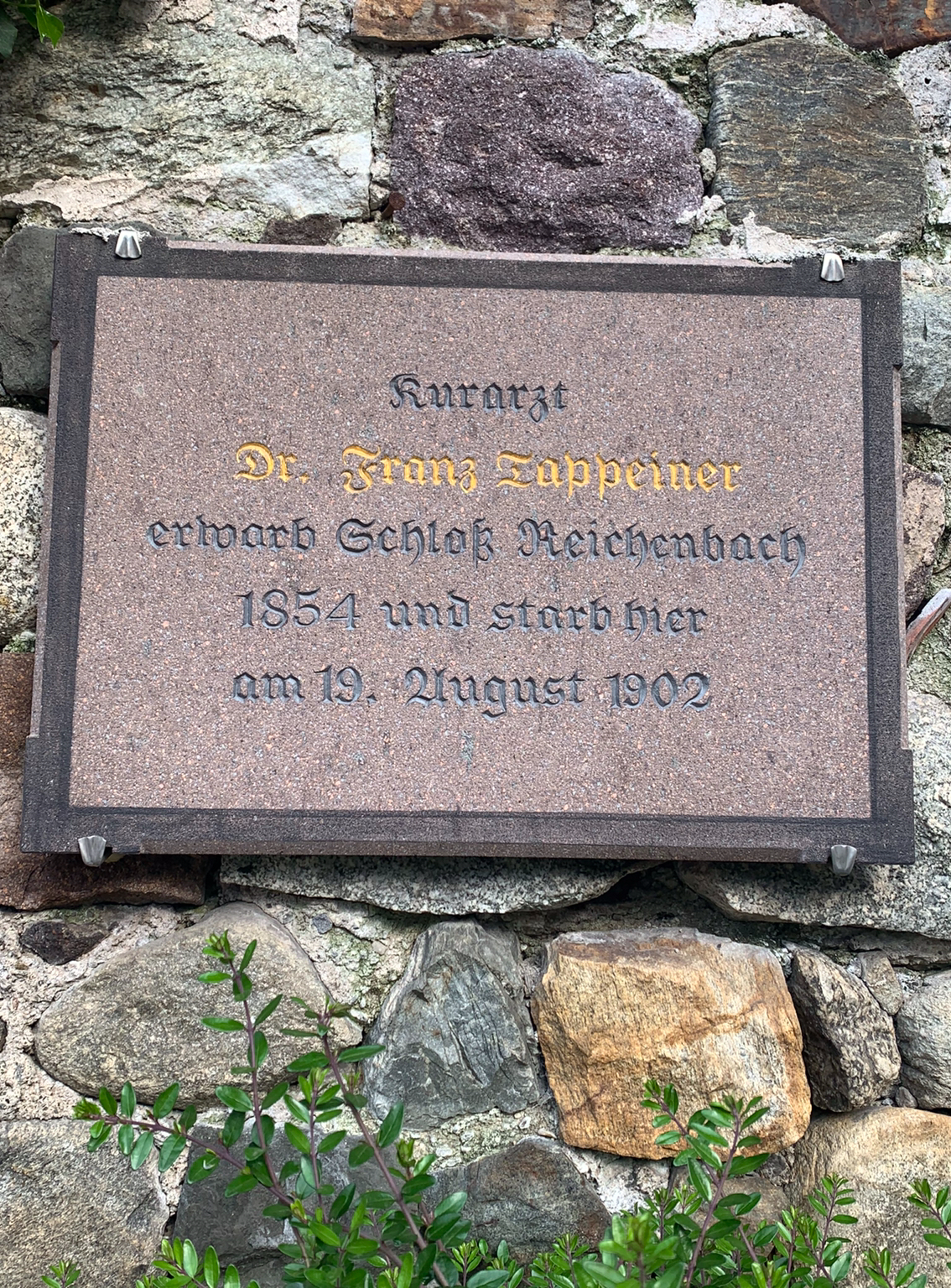
“The doctor Franz Tappeiner received the castle Reichenbach in 1854 and he died there the 18th of August 1902”

As an anthropologist, he is best known for his studies of the inhabitants of Tyrol. Throughout his career his collection of skulls was left to the Vienna Museum of Natural History and to the Ferdinandeum in Innsbruck.

Tappeiner was also active as a botanist. He described and herbarized over 6,000 plants. Tappeiner put at his own expense Tappeinerweg to an extension after nearly six-kilometer promenade in Meran and Dorf Tirol. The Tappeinerweg (Tappeiner Promenade), a popular 4 km trail in the city of Merano is named after him, as is the "Franz Tappeiner Hospital", also located in Merano.

== Franz Tappeiner’s medical contributions ==
In 1843 after completing his medical studies at the University of Vienna, he opened his personal clinic and a small pharmacy in his home town of Laas. He was particularly known for his roles as a surgeon and ophthalmologist. At the end of 1846 he moved to Meran, where he had the chance to observe the positive effects of the local climate in the treatment of specific diseases. He studied the different ways pulmonary tuberculosis was transmitted and his conclusions already came before the discovery of the tuberculosis bacillus by Robert Koch. Tappeiner highlighted how the infection spread through the air or through inhalation. In order to raise awareness of his findings, his friend Hausmann decided to publish in a small paperback some excerpts from a Tappeiner manuscript where the doctor explained the experiments he had conducted in Munich at professor Buhl' s Institute of Pathology and Anatomy. Furthermore, in 1855, a cholera epidemic broke out and Tappeiner spread information on precautionary measures to avoid contagion, inviting calm and advising good personal hygiene and a moderate lifestyle; he even indicated the detailed recipe of a remedy within everyone's reach, to be obtained in time in pharmacies, in order to be able to use it at the first symptoms of the disease, in order to block its course, which is often lethal. Despite the low cost of the drug, Tappeiner urged citizens in better economic conditions to offer it for free to those who could not afford it.

== The Tappeinerweg ==
In 1891, Franz Tappeiner suggested to the Mayor of Merano, Roman Weinberger, and to the Thermae director, Wilhelm von Pernwerth, to build a promenade that would reach the "Powder Tower".

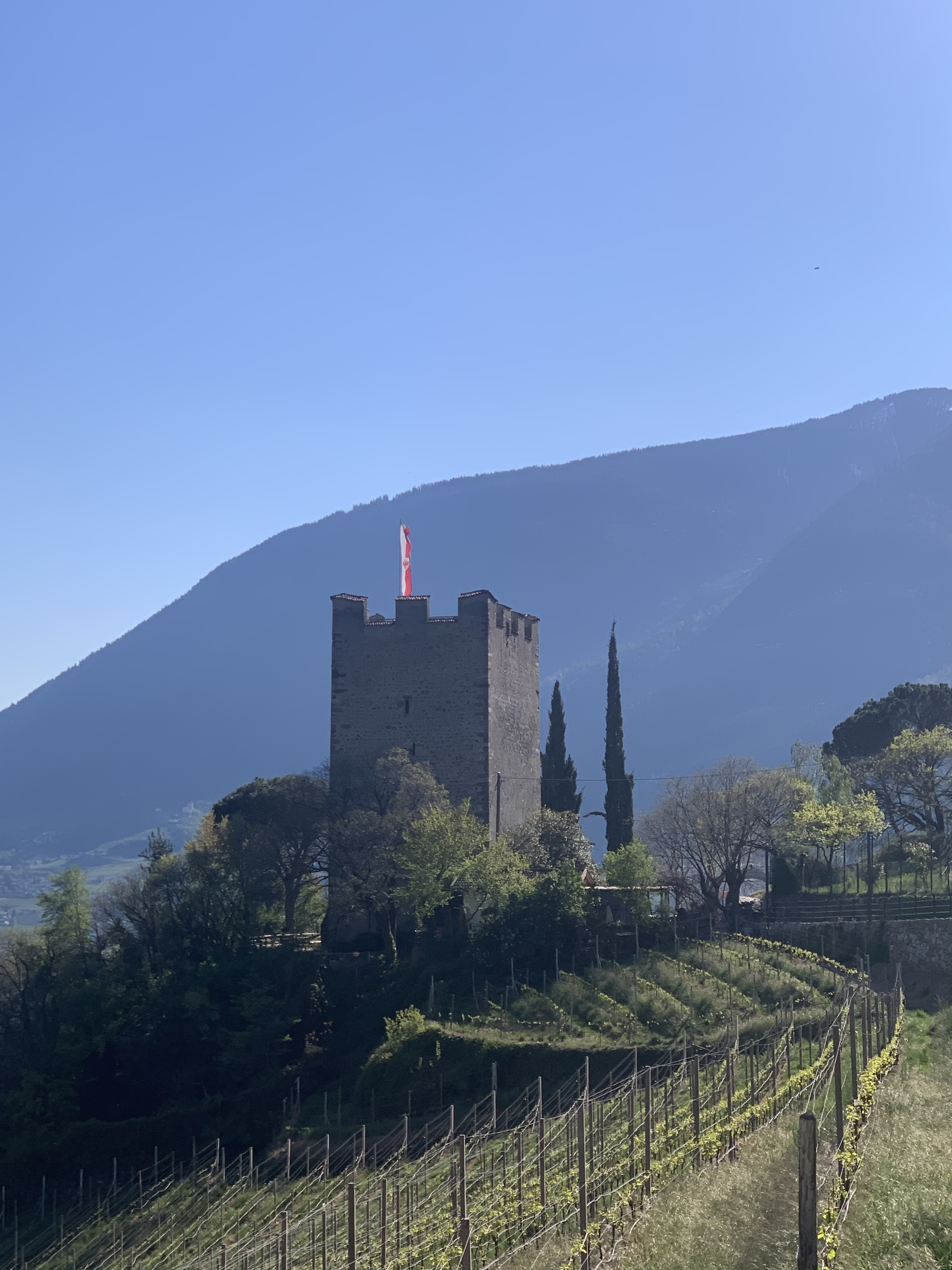
The "Powder Tower" along the Tappeinerweg.

The idea was unanimously approved and the city council decided to name the new promenade with its founder's name. The official opening of the "Tappeinerweg" on November 18, 1893, goes hand in hand with the inauguration of the monument in honor of its founder and financier.

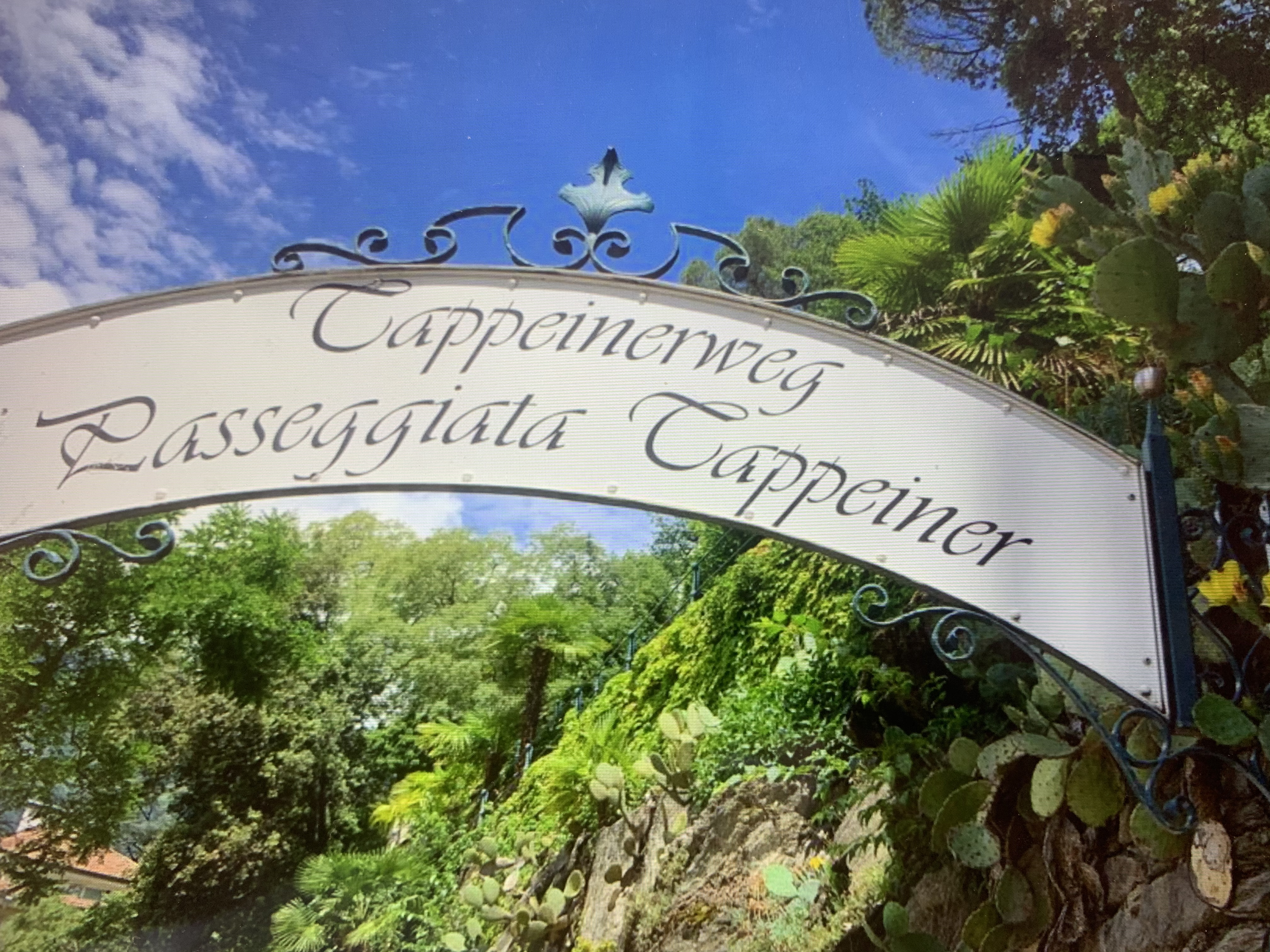
Entrance to the Tappeiner promenade.

In the 1920s work resumed for an extension of the "Tappeiner Promenade". In 1929, most of the beautiful panoramic route located halfway up the mountain above Merano was completed. In the following years, variants were perfected and new entrances created, and in 1932 the work was finally ready and complete. During Fascism, the name of the route, which according to a solemn deed signed by the Municipality of Merano in 1894 should have had the name of "Tappeinerweg" for eternity, was changed to "Promenade Princess of Piedmont". After Fascism, the title returned to the old dear name of "Tappeinerweg", "The Tappeiner Walk", so familiar to all long German or Italian people in Merano because the walk, in addition to being a great attraction for tourism, is above all an inalienable asset for the citizens.

== Botany and anthropology ==
Franz Tappeiner devoted himself to botany while still a student in Prague and began to collect botanical specimens from all over Tyrol. His herbarium finally amounted to 3,624 plant species. He tried to pursue a scientific career in the botanical field but unsuccessfully applied for the position of scientific assistant at the Botanical Institute of the University of Vienna. Before a planned but never carried out expedition to Sumatra, he donated a herbarium to the Ferdinandeum in Innsbruck. Anthropological studies finally took him through the whole of Tyrol to the area of the seven municipalities in order to determine the origin of the local population with the help of measurements on 4,935 skulls and 3,185 heads. His skull collection is now in the Natural History Museum in Vienna.

== Franz Tappeiner’s hospital ==
In order to raise awareness of Tappeiner's contribution; the new hospital named after the brilliant physician was built and made active in 1996, in Merano, Italy. Planned in 1974, the construction was added to an already existing hospital and it was carried out by the architects Novotny and Mahner with the contribution of the architecture of Josef March, head of the project.

== Honors ==
In addition to the Tappeinerweg, the Tappeinersteg in Merano, a primary school and the local hospital are named after him. A bust created by Julius Steiner reminds of him on Tappeinerweg. There are more busts in front of the Merano Hospital, which was unveiled on the occasion of the 100th birthday of the Merano Hospital on September 9, 2005.

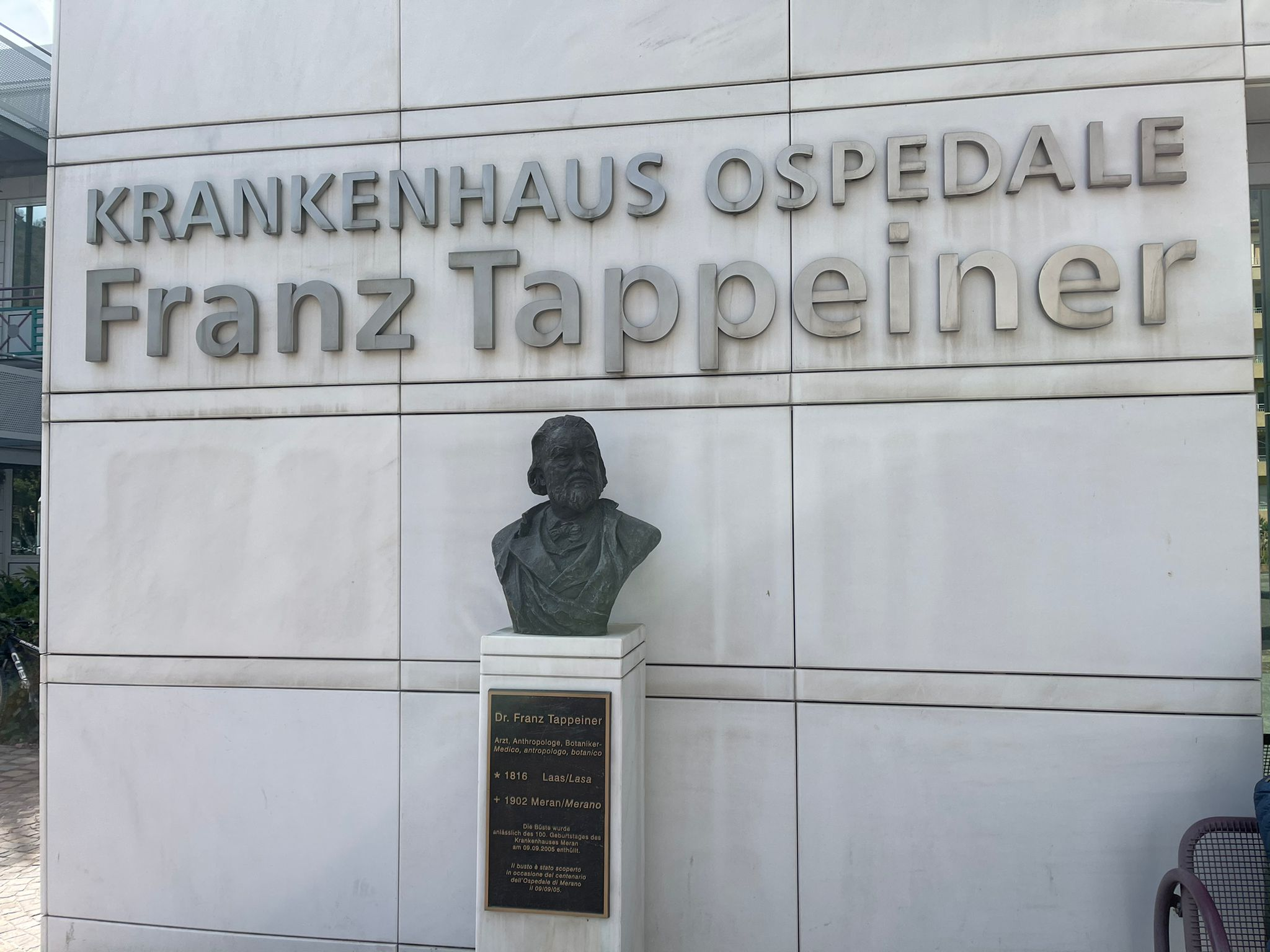
Bust of Franz Tappeiner in front of the Merano Hospital.

Another is located on the winter promenade of Merano.

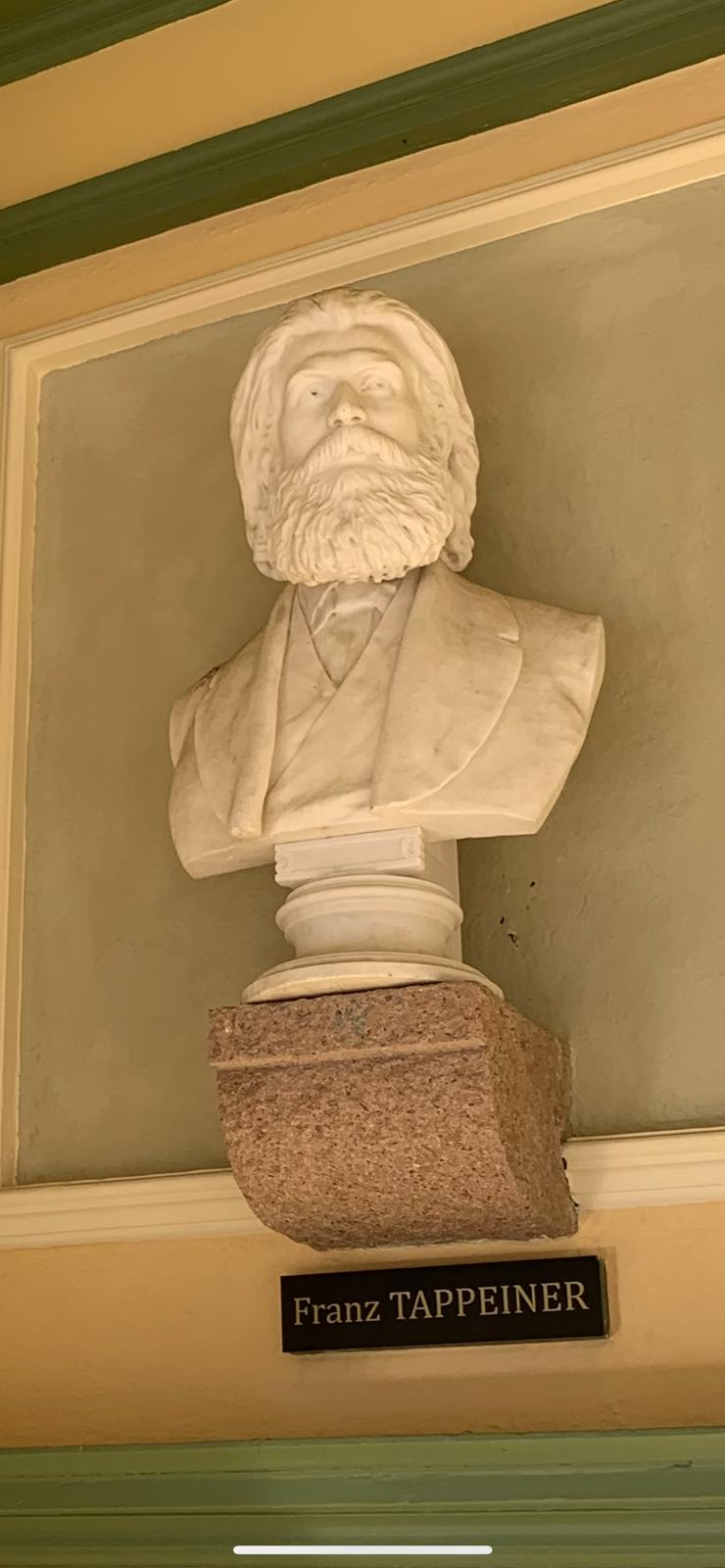
Bust of Franz Tappeiner along the winter promenade of Merano.

Raphael Hausmann wrote a biography about Tappeiner focussing on characterizing his complex personality and he also published "Die Weintraubenkur mit Rücksicht auf Erfahrungen in Meran", a compendium about pros and cons of the grape care, its efficacy and its harmful effects.

== Selected works ==
- Medica specimen generale nosotologiae (dissertation, 1843).
- Studien zur Anthropologie Tirols und der Sette Comuni, 1883 – Studies on Tyrolean anthropology and on the Sette Comuni.
- Eine prähistorische Fundstelle am Küchelberge bei Meran, 1892 – A prehistoric site of discovery in the Küchelberge near Meran.
- Zur Majafrage: den verherten Anthropologen Osterreichs und Deutschland, 1894.
- Beiträge zur Anthropologie, Ethnologie und Urgeschichte von Tirol (with others), 1894. – Contribution to the anthropology, ethnology and prehistory of Tyrol.
- Der europäische Mensch und die Tiroler, 1896 – The European man and the Tyrolean.
- Der europäische Mensch und die Eiszeit, 1898 – The European man and the Ice Age.
- Meine anthropologische Weltanschauung, 1901 – My anthropological worldview.
- Abram R., Banda A., Marseiler S., Neuwirth M., Pruccoli R., Rosani F.; “Franz Tappeiner, kurarzt und mäzen-medico e mecenate”; Bolzano; Athesia; 2017.

== Bibliography ==
1. Killy, Walther, and Rudolf Vierhaus. Schmidt - Theyer. Google Books, Walter de Gruyter, 30 Nov. 2011, books.google.it/books?id=0-hrRQvGV7sC&pg=PA678&lpg=PA678&dq=%22Tappeiner.
2. Abram R., Banda A., Marseiler S., Neuwirth M., Pruccoli R., Rosani F.; “Franz Tappeiner, kurarzt und mäzen-medico e mecenate”; Bolzano; Athesia; 2017.
3. Tappeiner Franz | Galileum Autografi.” Www.galileumautografi.com, www.galileumautografi.com/autore.php?id=937&nome=tappeiner-franz.
4. “Google Translate.” Translate.google.com, translate.google.com/translate?hl=en&sl=de&u=www.suedtirol-it.com/meran/promenade.html&prev=search.
5. SPA, Südtiroler Informatik AG | Informatica Alto Adige. “Merano - Ospedale ‘“Tappeiner”’ | Opere Pubbliche | Amministrazione Provinciale | Provincia Autonoma Di Bolzano - Alto Adige.” Amministrazione Provinciale, www.provincia.bz.it/costruire-abitare/edilizia-pubblica/opere-ultimate/merano-ospedale-tappeiner.asp.
6. “Tappeiner%2C Franz%3B - ZVAB.” Www.zvab.com, www.zvab.com/servlet/SearchResults?an=Tappeiner%2C+Franz%3B&cm_sp=det-_-bdp-_-author.
7. “Monumenti a Merano.” Www.sentres.com, www.sentres.com/it/merano/monumenti.
8. “Monumento Dr. Franz Tappeiner.” Www.outdooractive.com, www.outdooractive.com/it/poi/merano-e-dintorni/monumento-dr.-franz-tappeiner/32631824/. ‌ ‌
