= Pfrillsee =

Lake in Tyrol, Austria

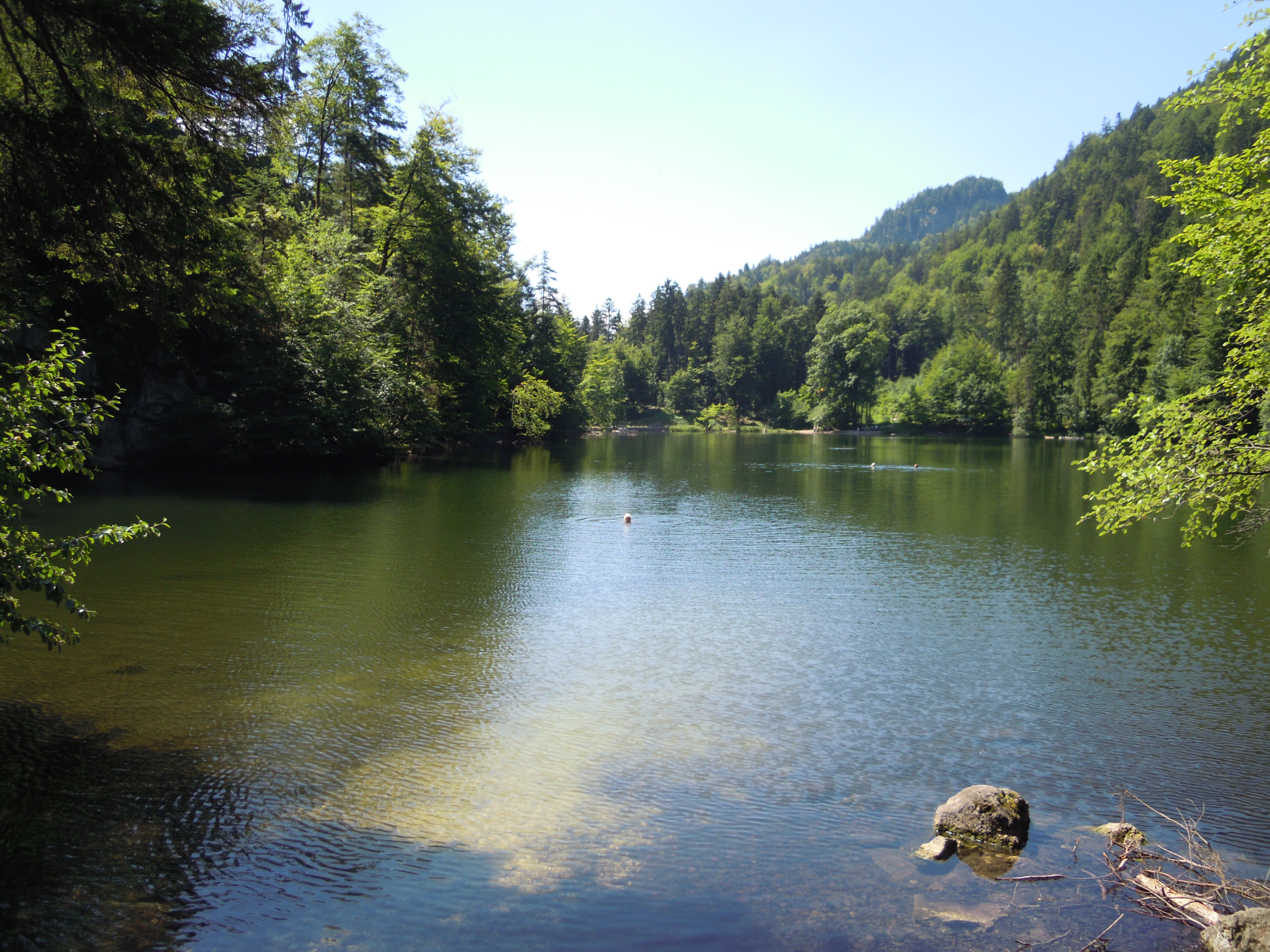

- Location within Tyrol, Austria
- Location: Tyrol
- Coordinates: 47°35′39″N 12°08′53″E

Pfrillsee is a lake of Tyrol, Austria.
