= Egelsee (Tyrol) =

Lake in Tyrol, Austria

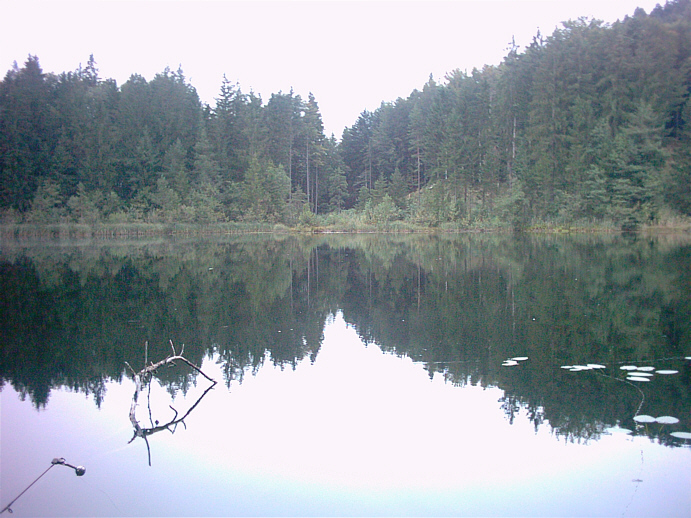
- Lake Egelsee

- Location within Austria
- Location: Kufstein, Tyrol, Austria
- Coordinates: 47.6132°N 12.1704°E
- Type: lake

Egelsee is a lake in Kufstein, Tyrol, Austria.
