= Hechtsee =

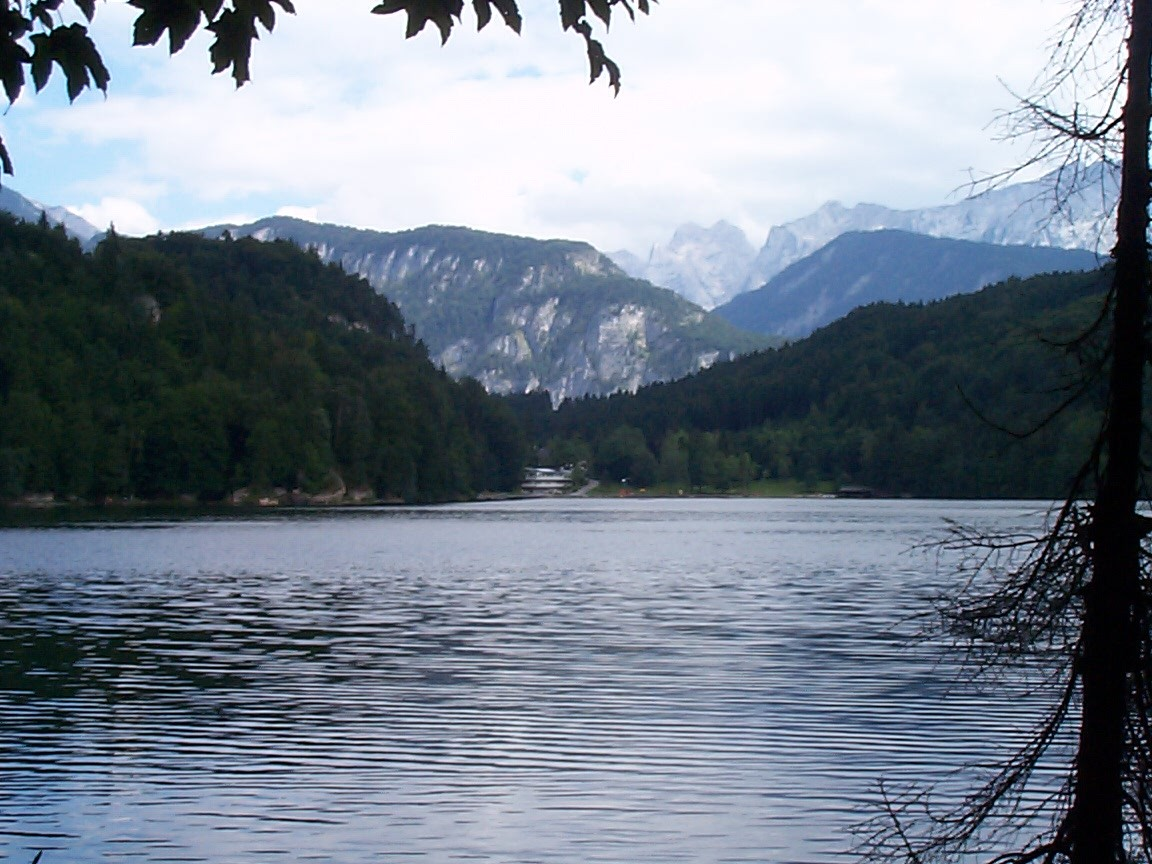
- Lake Hechtsee

- Location within Austria
- Location: Tyrol, Austria
- Coordinates: 47°36′32″N 12°09′48″E
- Type: lake

Hechtsee is a lake in Tyrol, Austria. It is also the name of a scattered village (zerstreute Häuser). Both are part of the Kufstein District.

The Austria–Germany border is located 20 meters north of the lake.

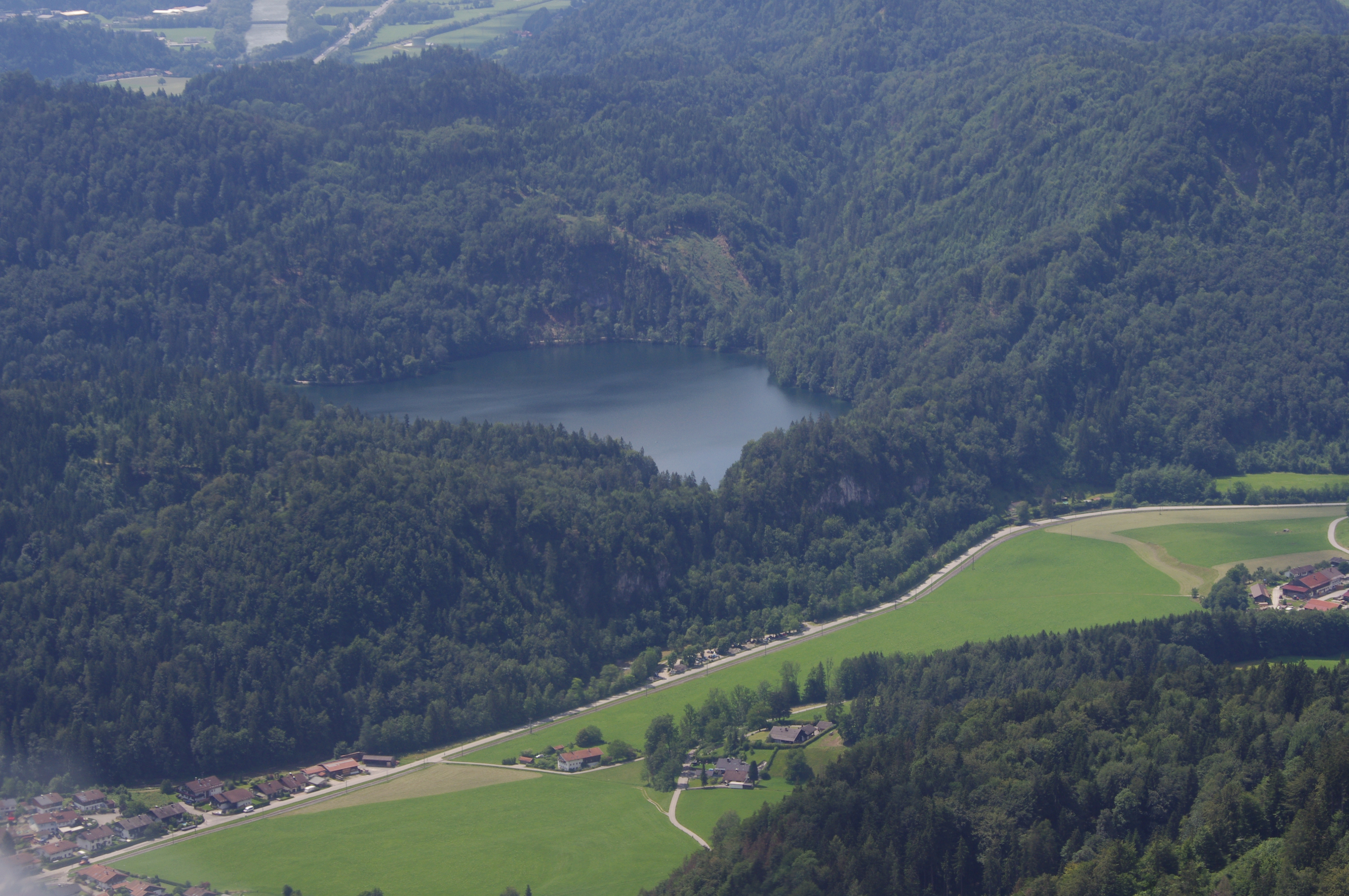
Aerial view Hechtsee

== Geography ==
The lake is west of Kiefersfelden (Bavaria) and north of Kufstein (Tyrol) in the Brandenburg Alps. With a surface area of 0.28 km² and a maximal depth of 57 m it is the deepest of the six lakes west of Kufstein.
