= Austria–Germany border =

International border

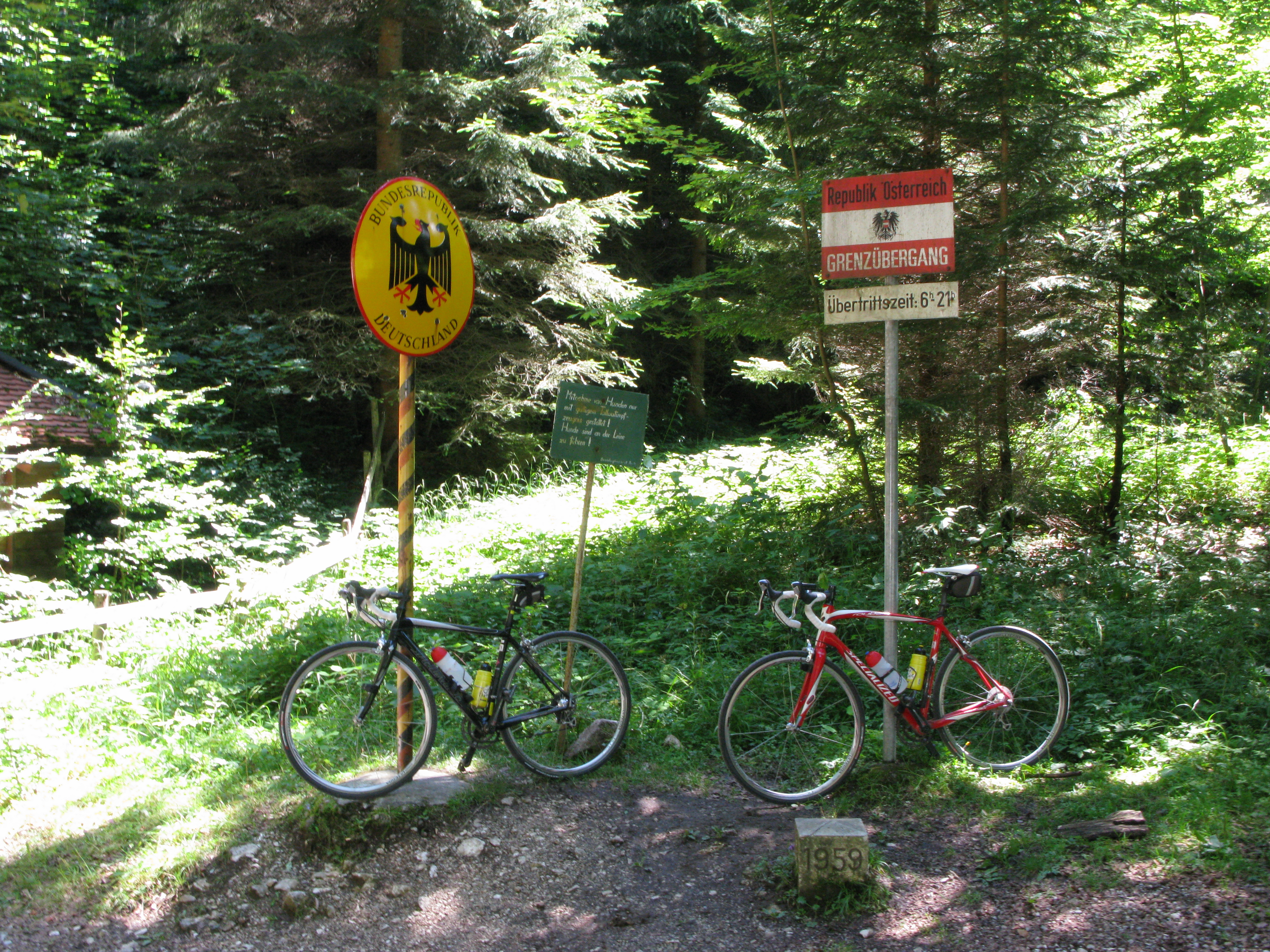
- German-Austrian border signs

Characteristics
- Entities: Austria Germany
- Length: 817 km (508 mi)
- Enclave and exclaves: Jungholz, Kleinwalsertal (Austrian pene-exclaves)

The border between the modern states of Austria and Germany (German: Grenze zwischen Deutschland und Österreich) has a length of 815.9 km (507.0 mi), or 817.0 km (507.7 mi) respectively. It is the longest international border of Austria and the tied longest border of Germany with another country (the other one being the border with the Czech Republic, with the same length of 817 km (508 mi)).

== Course ==
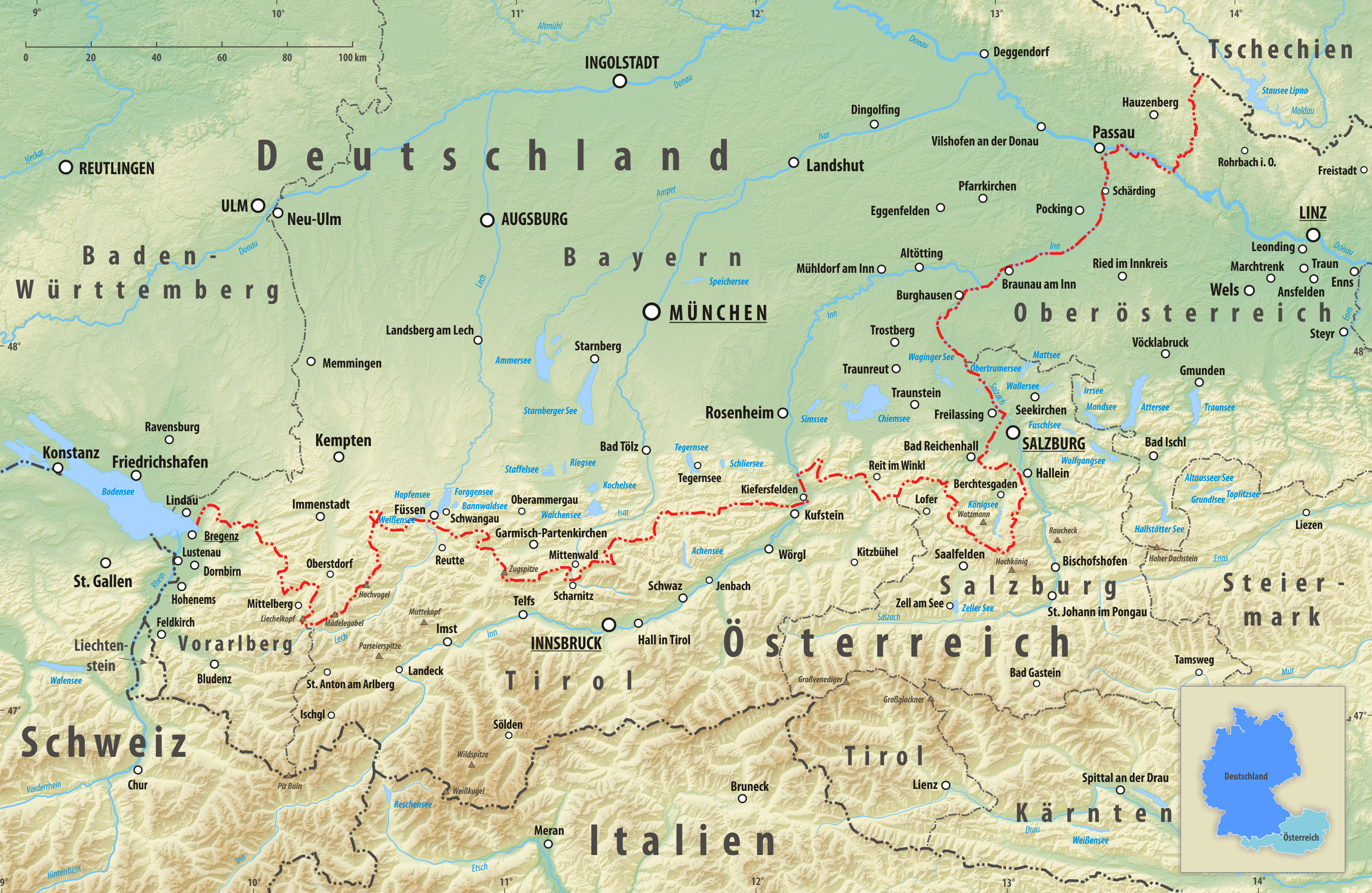
Course of the German-Austrian border (red)

Within its western part, the border runs roughly from east to west, but from a point south of Salzburg to its eastern end, located at the tripoint of Germany, Austria and the Czech Republic, it runs in a mainly northeastward direction. The western end is located at the border tripoint of Germany, Austria and Switzerland within the Obersee part of Lake Constance (Bodensee), although the exact course of the international borders within Lake Constance have never been defined. The border is 817 kilometres (508 mi) long, but a straight line between the endpoints is 345 kilometres (214 mi) long.

Jungholz and Kleinwalsertal are two Austrian pene-exclaves; they can only be reached by road through German territory.

Besides Lake Constance, the border does not pass through any significant lake, but it follows the Danube, Inn and Salzach rivers along the eastern part and the Leiblach in its western part. Otherwise, the border follows the western part of the Northern Limestone Alps (Allgäu Alps, Ammergau Alps, Wetterstein, Karwendel, Bavarian Prealps, Kaiser Mountains, Chiemgau Alps, Berchtesgaden Alps), although a few valleys cross the border, too (e.g., the Inn Valley near Kufstein).

The Austrian states of Vorarlberg, Tyrol, Salzburg, and Upper Austria run along the international border, as does the German state of Bavaria.

=== Tripoints ===
The eastern tripoint between the countries of Germany, Austria and the Czech Republic is located at 48°46′18″N 13°50′22″E, near the villages of Schwarzenberg am Böhmerwald and Bayerischer Plöckenstein. The western tripoint is located between Germany, Austria and Switzerland, at approximately 47°33′N 9°34′E, in the eastern part of Upper Lake Constance.

== International bodies of water ==
=== Lakes ===
- Eibelesee
- Lake Constance (also borders with Switzerland)
- Rannasee
- Taubensee
- Wöhrsee

=== Rivers and creeks ===
- Aschauer
- Augustinergraben
- Bächteletobel
- Baumgartenbach
- Bayrachbach
- Berchtesgadener Ache
- Berndlgraben
- Bolgenach
- Breitach
- Bächgraben
- Bärnbach
- Bürgerbach
- Danube (Donau)
- Dandlbach
- Doserbach
- Dürrach
- Eibelebach
- Eibkendlbach
- Enzenbach
- Eyenbach
- Fermersbach
- Finsterbach
- Fischbach (Linder)
- Fischbach (Weiße Traun)
- Fugenbach
- Gatterlbach
- Großache
- Hagenbach
- Hirschbichlklausgraben
- Holderbach
- Hörnlebach
- Hühnersbach
- Inn
- Isar
- Kälbergernbach
- Kesselbach
- Kieferbach
- Kleiner Bach
- Kräutergrabenbach
- Köhlerbach
- Laublisbach
- Lappbach
- Lech
- Lecknerbach
- Leiblach
- Leutasch
- Lenzengraben
- Littenbach
- Lofer
- Loisach
- Markgraben
- Maxenbach
- Mosertalbach
- Mühlbach
- Naidernach
- Neualmbach
- Neuhäuslgraben
- Pittenbach
- Polusbach
- Reichenauer Graben
- Reichenbach
- Rickenbach
- Riedbach
- Rißbach
- Roggentalbach
- Rohrmoosbach
- Rothach
- Roßkarbach
- Saalach
- Salzach with several bridges, e.g. Oberndorf-Laufen
- Sandbach
- Schaffitzerbach
- Schanztobel
- Scheidbach
- Schellenbach
- Schlafblassenbach
- Schlawitzabach
- Schwarzenbach
- Schönbach
- Seebach
- Steinbach
- Stöcklbach
- Tiefengraben
- Totermannbach
- Unkenbach
- Valepp
- Vils
- Walchen
- Weißach
- Weißbach
- Wertach
- Zimmerholsbach
- Äuelebach

== International bridges ==
- Alte Innbrücke, Schärding - Neuhaus
- Kräutelstein
- Saalachbrücke Salzburg-Freilassing

== International mountain ranges ==
- Alps
- Alpine foothills

== International mountains ==
- Ammer Saddle
- Dürrnberg
- Fellhorn
- Kranzhorn
- Untersberg
- Zugspitze

== Settlements near the border ==
- Freilassing Germany / Salzburg Austria
- Großgmain (Salzburg (state)) Austria
- Kufstein Austria / Oberaudorf Germany
- Oberau (Berchtesgaden) Germany
- Waidring (Kitzbühel District) Austria
- Walserberg Austria

== International traffic ==
=== Road ===
- Inn Valley Autobahn
- Schrofen Pass
- Steinpass
- Ursprung Pass

=== Rail ===
- Ausserfern Railway (S7)
- Mittenwald Railway (S6)
- Rosenheim–Kufstein railway (RJ, EC 89, ICE 11, ICE 24, RB 54)
- Rosenheim–Salzburg railway (EN, RJ, RE 5,)
- Vorarlberg Railway (EC/ECE, ICE 62, REX 1, S1, S7)
- Wels–Passau railway (ICE, IC 17)

== History ==
The border was confirmed in a treaty between the countries in 1972, after having been defined by a number of agreements, likewise with preceding conflicts, between the Austrian Empire and the Kingdom of Bavaria in the 19th century. In 1938 the countries merged through the Anschluss. This was reverted in 1955 by the Austrian State Treaty, which re-established Austria as a sovereign state. The Schengen Area removed border controls at the border in 1997. Temporary border controls were reinstalled in 2015 in response to the European migrant crisis. These temporary border controls were scheduled to be removed on 12 May 2020, although they are liable to be extended in six-month periods.

== See also ==
- Austria–Germany relations
- de:Fiderepasshütte
- de:Purtschellerhaus
