= Kieferbach =

River in Germany

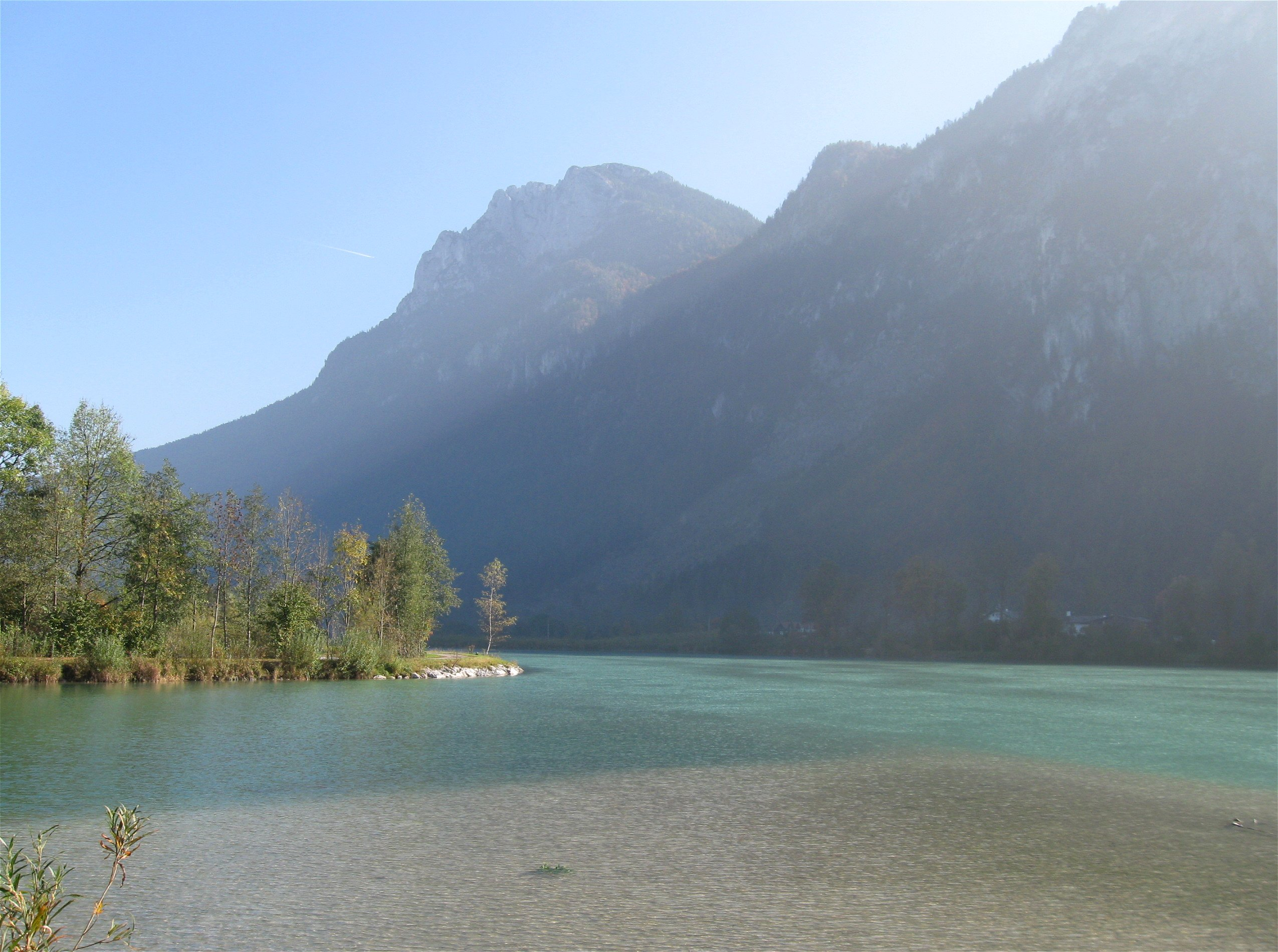
- The mouth of the Kieferbach

Location
- Countries: Germany and Austria
- States: Bavaria and Tyrol

Physical characteristics
- Mouth
  - location: Inn
  - coordinates: 47.6061°N 12.2019°E
- Length: 23.8 km (14.8 mi)

Basin features
- Progression: Inn→ Danube→ Black Sea

Kieferbach (also: Thierseer Ache) is a river of Tyrol, Austria and Bavaria, Germany. It is a left tributary of the Inn and flows into it near Kiefersfelden.

== Course ==
The river rises in Tyrol as Klausbach from several small, occasionally dry creeks on the north side of the Schönfeldjoch Mountains near the Ursprung Pass. It flows through the Thierseer Lake in the Thierseetal through the municipality of Thiersee, past the cement quarry in Wachtl over the border to Bavaria. In the Gießenbach, the body of water has two official names: Kieferbach and Klausenbach. After the tributary of the Gießenbach on the left, the Wachtl-Express-Bahn and the Thierseestraße follow the course of the river through the Klausenbachtal in the direction of Kiefersfelden. About halfway the Hechtsee drain flows to the right. The river then flows as Kieferbach through the village and finally flows into the Inn in the Unteriefer district.

== Usage ==
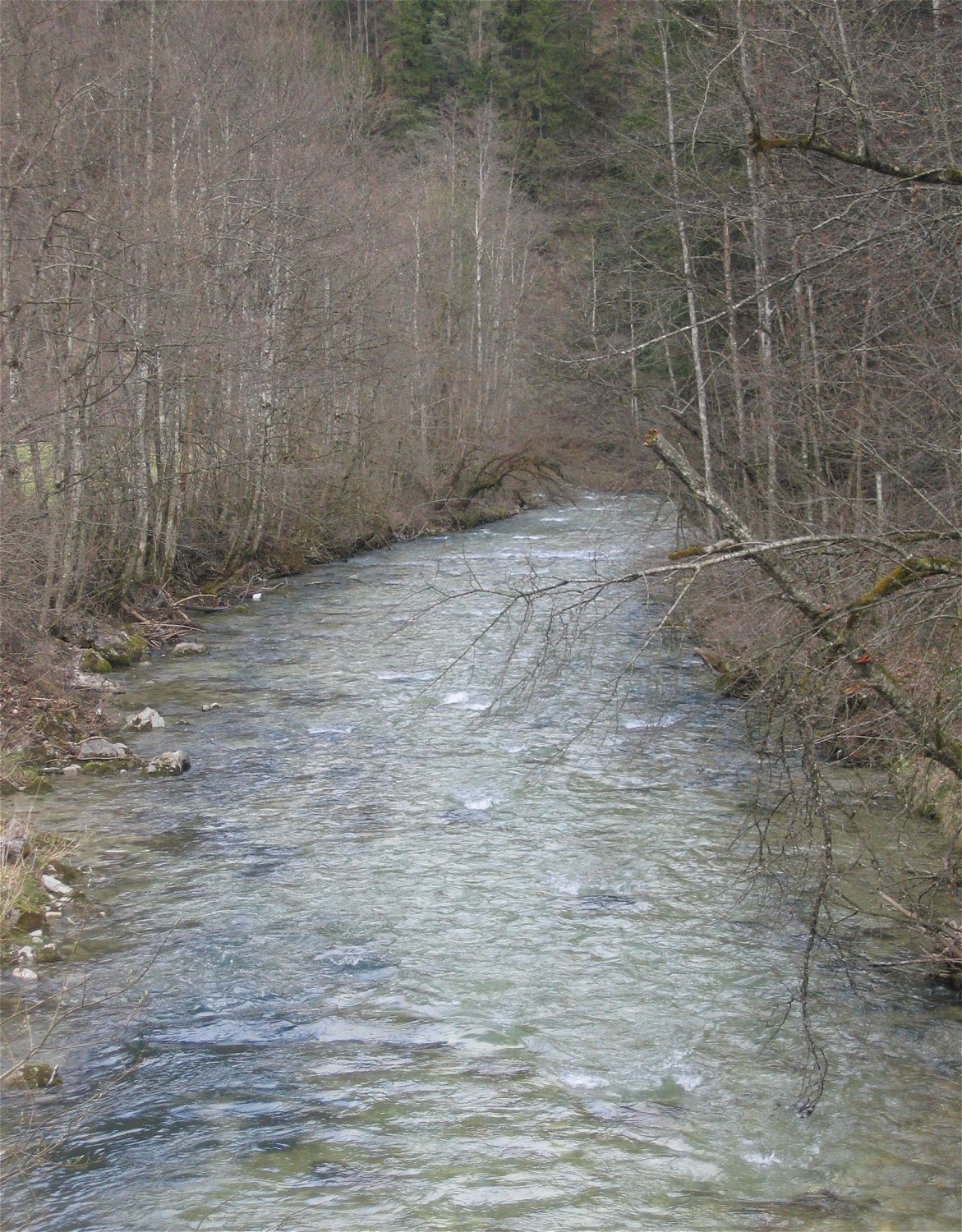
The Kieferbach river near Thiersee, district Wachtl

In the middle of Kiefersfelden, there is a weir and a hydropower screw on the right bank.

== Ecology ==
The course of the Kieferbach is mostly natural, or close to nature. It has water quality class II in Tyrol

== See also ==
- List of rivers of Bavaria
