= Gießenbach (Kieferbach) =

River in Germany

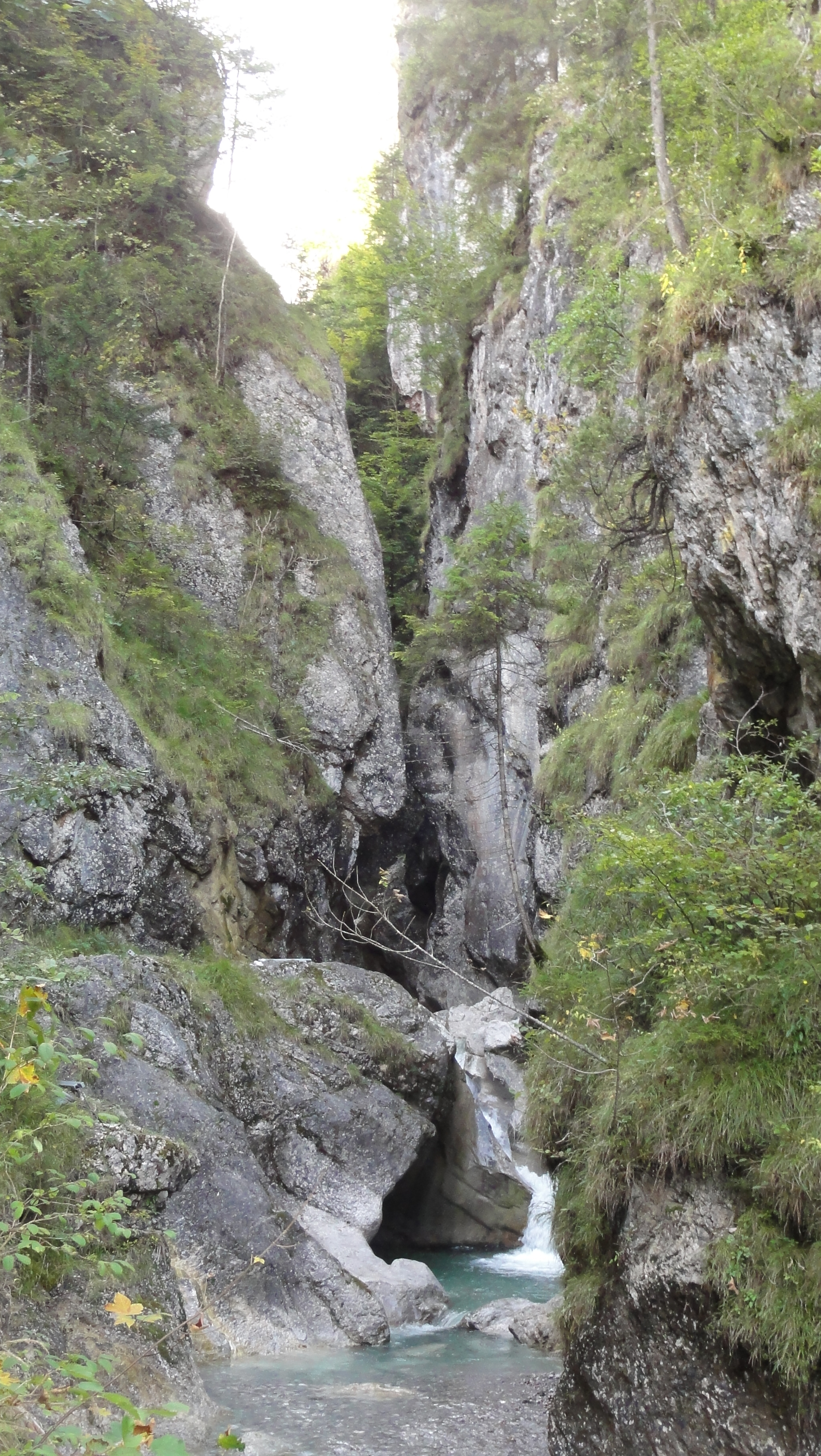
- The slot canyon Gießenbachklamm with the Gießenbach

Location
- Country: Germany
- States: Bavaria

Physical characteristics
- Mouth
  - location: Kieferbach
  - coordinates: 47°36′43″N 12°08′48″E

Basin features
- Progression: Kieferbach→ Inn→ Danube→ Black Sea

The Gießenbach is a river of Bavaria, Germany. It is a left tributary of the Kieferbach and flows into it west of Kiefersfelden.

== See also ==
- List of rivers of Bavaria
