= Vorderkaiserfelden Hut =

Austrian mountain refuge

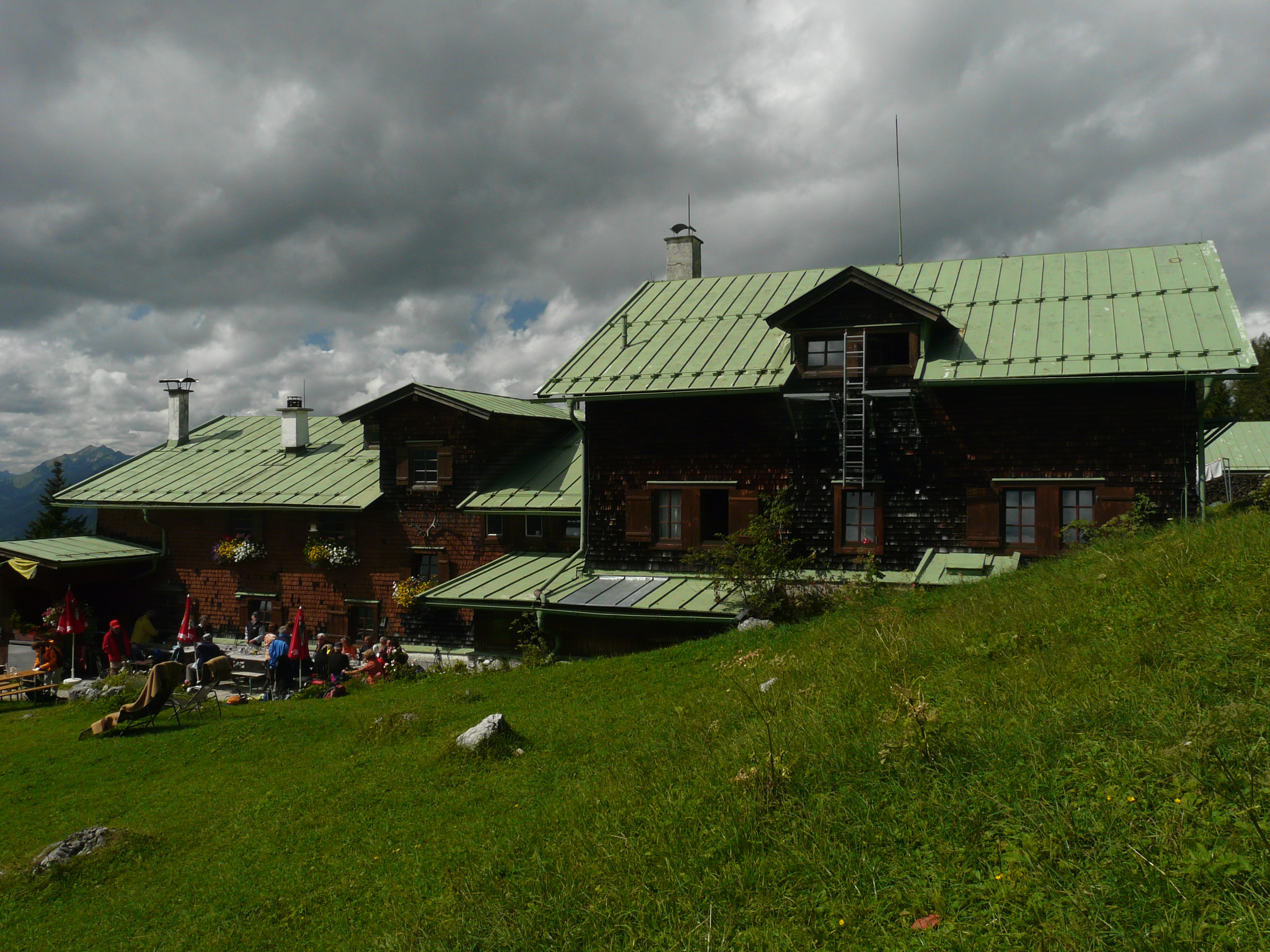
- The Vorderkaiserfelden Hut
- Interactive map of the Vorderkaiserfelden Hut area

General information
- Coordinates: 47.60583°N 12.23917°E
- Elevation: 1,384 m (4,541 ft)
- Owner: DAV Oberland branch (Munich)

Website
- www.vorderkaiserfelden.com

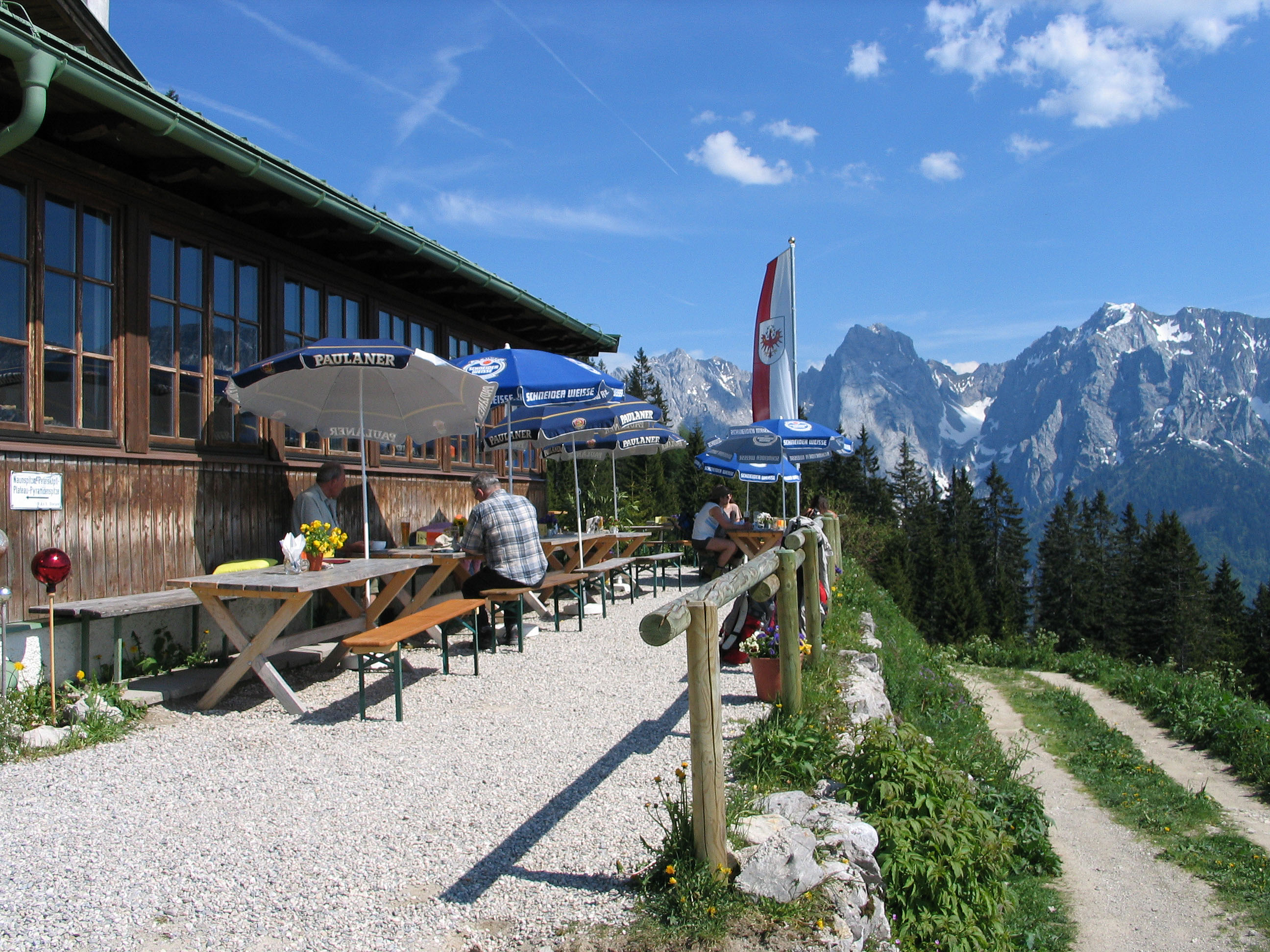
Vorderkaiserfelden Hut

The Vorderkaiserfelden Hut (German: Vorderkaiserfeldenhütte) is an alpine hut in the Kufstein district, Austria. It is located at 1,384 metres (4,541 ft) on the southwest slope of the Zahmer Kaiser below the Naunspitze and high above the Kaisertal valley in the Kaisergebirge mountain range. It has a good view over the Inn valley and Kufstein and across to the Mangfall Mountains and the Wilder Kaiser.

== Description ==
The hut is managed by the German Alpine Club's Oberland section. It has a 56 dormitory mattresses, 20 beds in double rooms and 11 in multibed rooms.

The Vorderkaiserfelden Hut is open year-round except three weeks in December and after Easter. It can be accessed from Kufstein, the hike takes about 2.5 hours, or from Ebbs, also within about 2.5 hours.

Already in 1889, a hut with 6 communal bunks and 14 beds existed.

In September 2023, the Oberland section announced that a replacement building for the Vorderkaiserfelden Hut is being planned due to structural defects.

== Access ==
- by bus from Munich in 1h 15min to Kufstein station
- by bus from Kufstein station on line 4030 to Sparchen or to Ebbs/Reit "Cafe Zacherl"
- by car to the payment car park at the entrance to the Kaisertal valley in the Kufstein suburb of Sparchen.

== Approaches ==
- from Kufstein-Sparchen via Sparchenstiege, Veitenhof and Rietzaualm in 2.5 hours.
- from Ebbs/Reit via the "Musikantenweg" (No.811) in 3 hours.
- from the Gasthof "Zur Schanze" via the Rietzaualm in 2.5 hours.

== Crossings ==
- Stripsenjochhaus (1,577 m) via Höhenweg, Hochalm and Feldalm saddle, duration: 4 hours
- Anton Karg Haus and Hans Berger Haus via the Hechleitenalm, easy, duration: 2 hours

== Ascents ==
- Naunspitze (1,633 m), medium, duration: 45 minutes
- Petersköpfl (1,745 m), medium, duration: 1 hour
- Pyramidenspitze (1,998 m), via the Zahmer Kaiser plateau, medium, duration: 2.5 hours
- Pyramidenspitze (1,998 m), via Hinterkaiserfeldenalm, medium, duration: 2.5 hours
- Vordere Kesselschneid (2,002 m), via Höhenweg, Ochsweidkar cirque, medium, duration: 3 hours
- Route to the Zahmer Kaiser over the Pyramidenspitze with descent through the Winkelkar cirque to Durchholzen.
- various climbing routes on the Naunspitze, the Petersköpfl and the Steingrubenwand as well as the Heimköpfl climbing garden (Klettergarten).

== Gallery ==
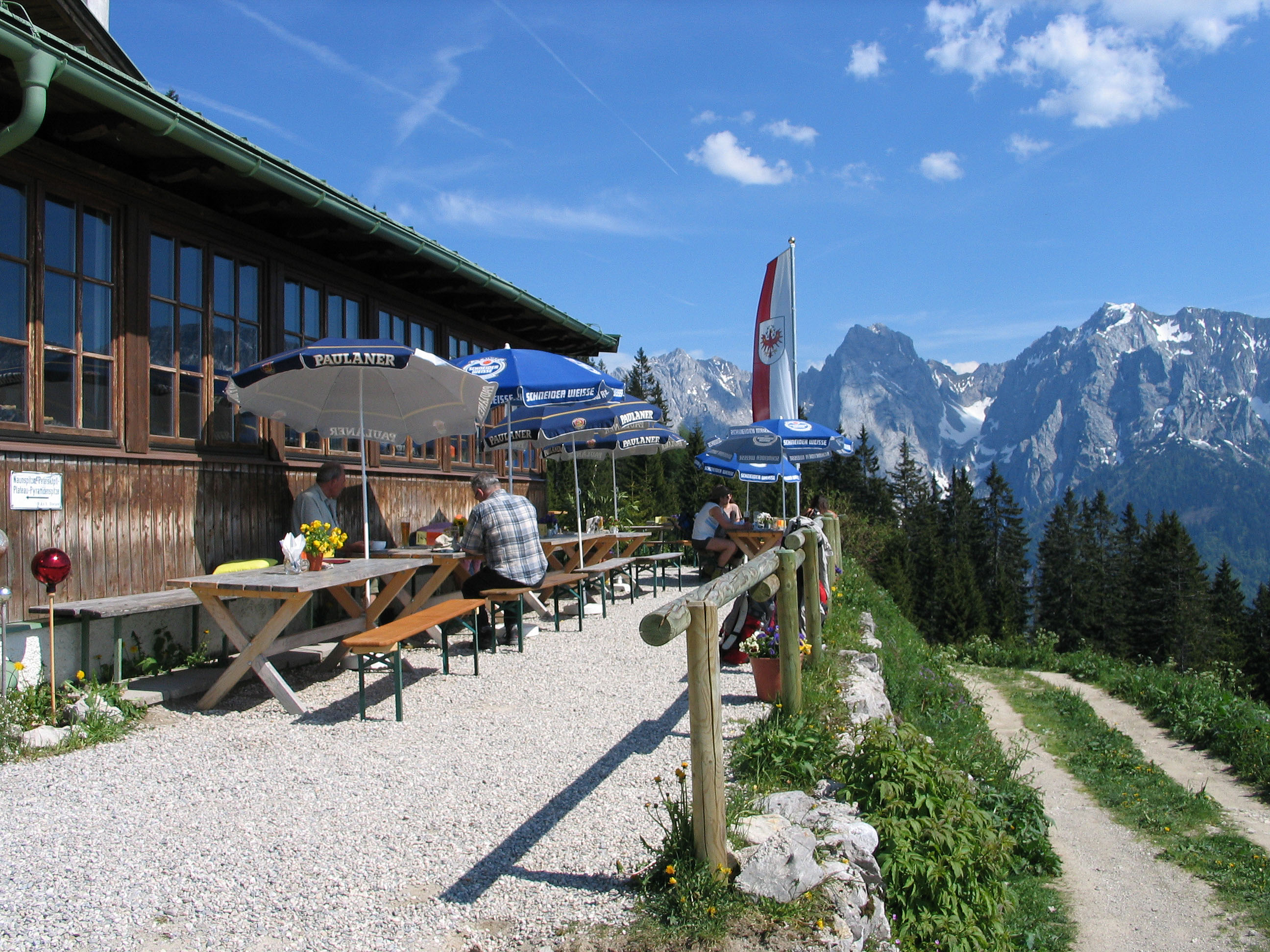
The terrasse of the Vorderkaiserfelden Hut

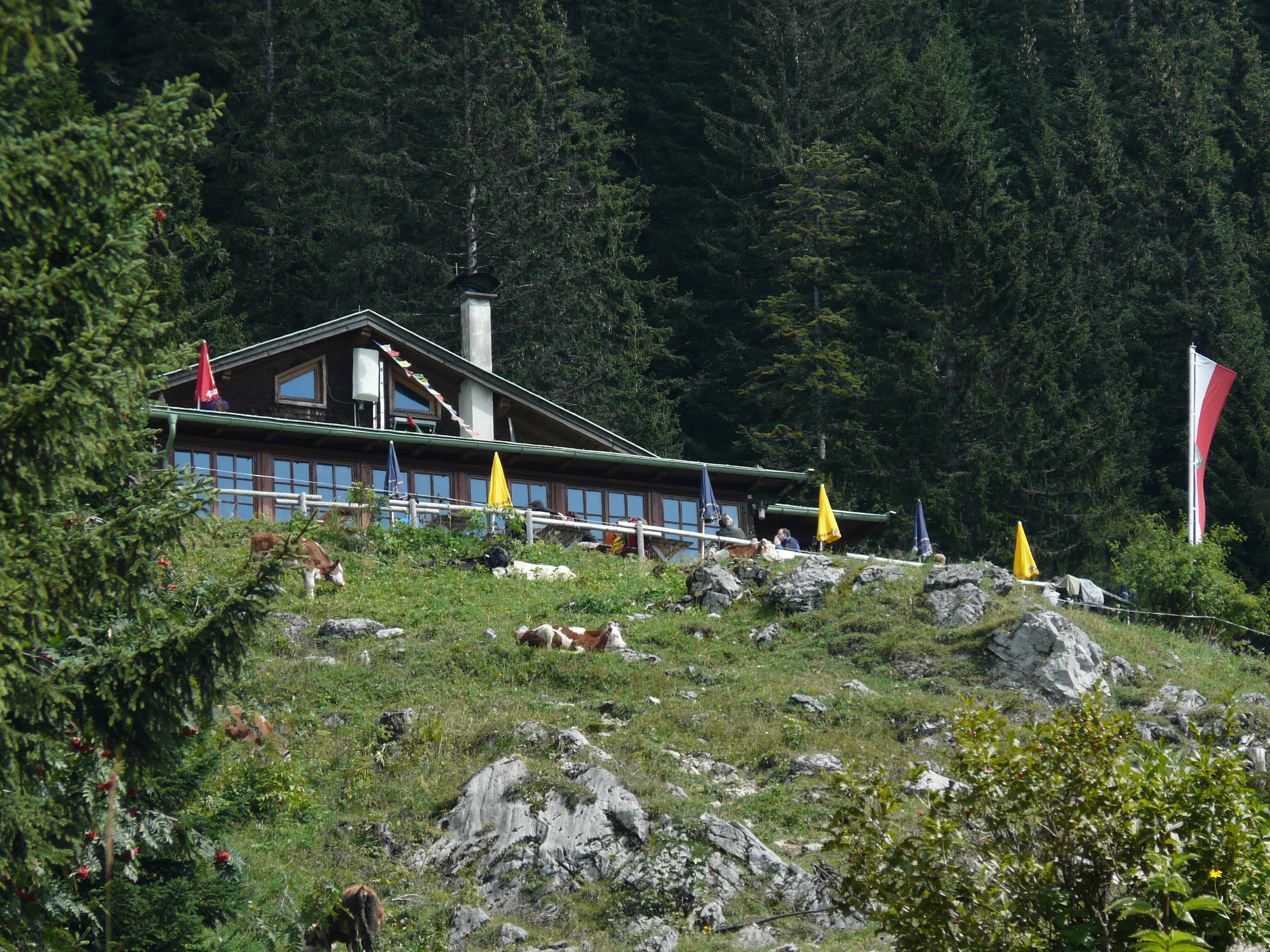
A little below the Vorderkaiserfelden Hut

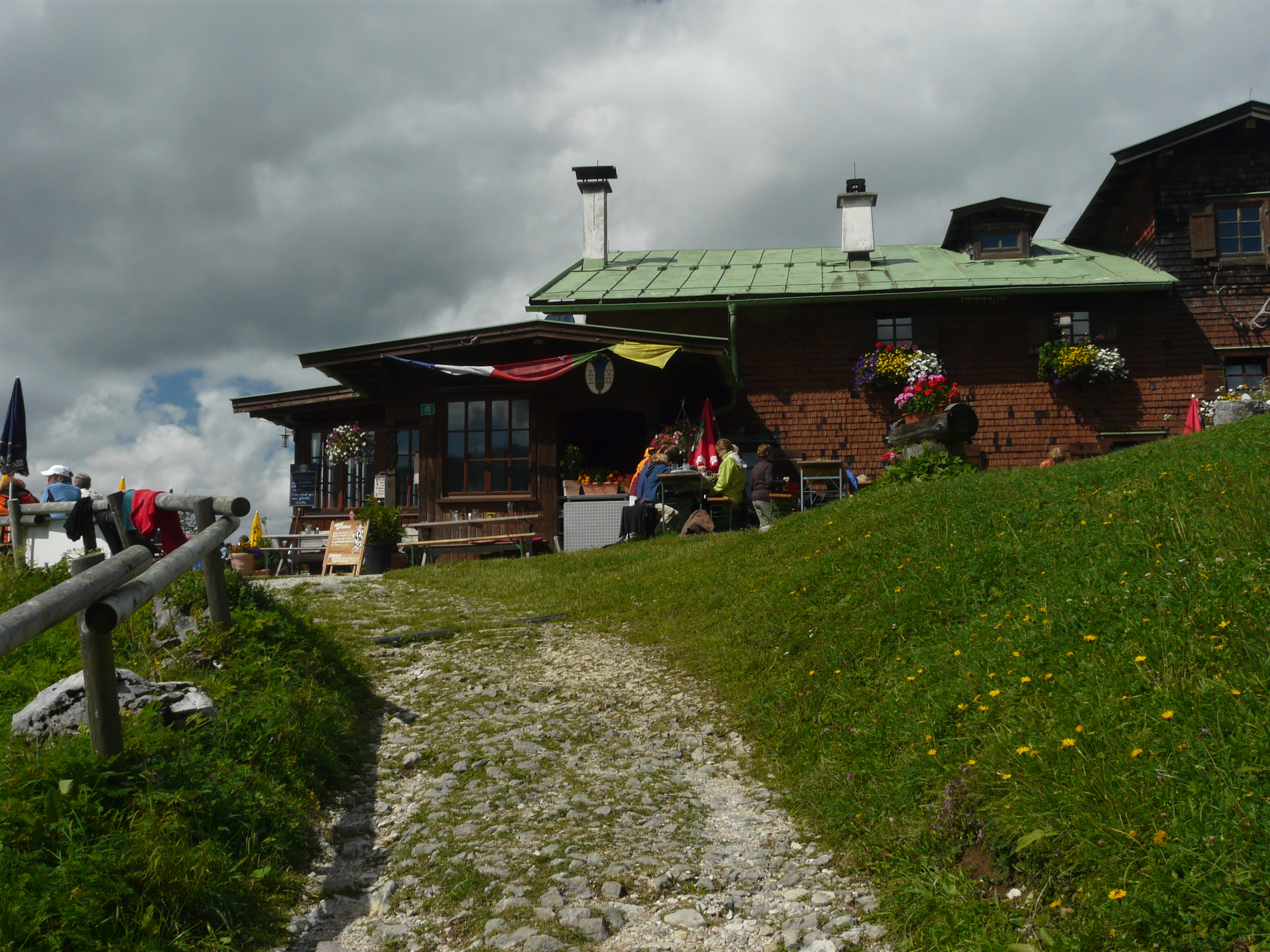
En route to the Vorderkaiserfelden Hut
