= Pyramidenspitze =

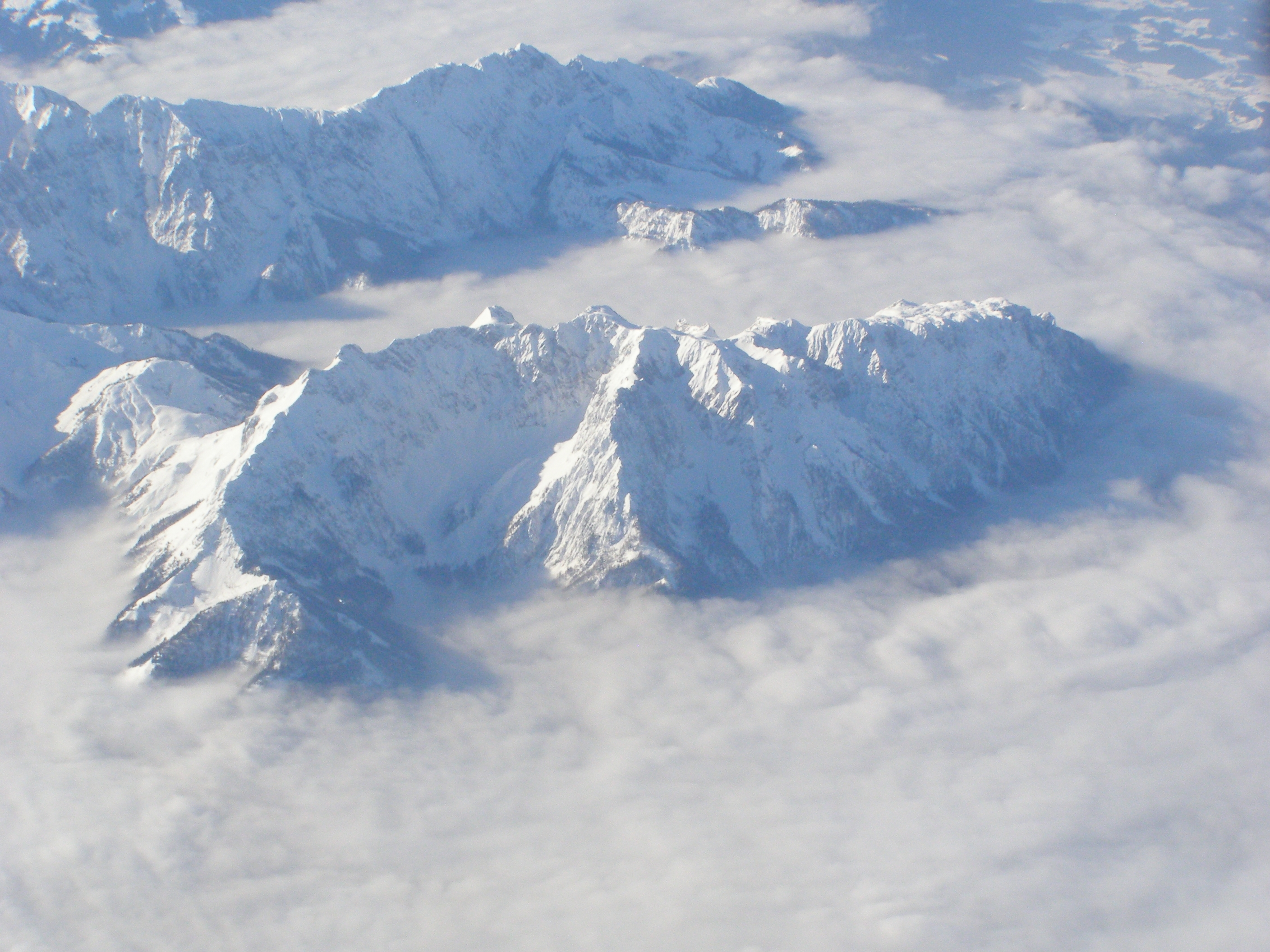
- Pyramidenspitze from the air

Highest point
- Elevation: 1,998 m (6,555 ft)
- Coordinates: 47°36′37″N 12°16′36″E

Geography
- Location within Alps
- Location: Tyrol, Austria
- Parent range: Kaisergebirge

Geology
- Rock age: Triassic
- Mountain type: Wetterstein limestone

The Pyramidenspitze is a mountain, 1,998 metres high, of the Kaisergebirge in the Austrian state of Tyrol.

The Pyramidenspitze is only the second highest summit in the Zahmer Kaiser after the largely unknown, 2,002-metre-high (6,568 ft) Vordere Kesselschneid, but is the most well-known and most frequently climbed. To the south and west of the Pyramidenspitze is a high, karstified plateau, covered with mountain pine, which falls steeply into the valley of the Kaisertal and has a long arête with several summits extending towards Kufstein. To the north it is separated by a wind gap from the Jovenspitze. To the northwest the Pyramidenspitze drops steeply over the Eggersgrinn and to the northeast it drops down rock precipices into the Winkel cirque (Winkelkar).

== Routes ==
The Pyramidenspitze may be reached from the west from the Vorderkaiserfelden Hut over a long but worthwhile path that runs past the Naunspitze (1,633 m), Petersköpfl (1,745 m) and Einserkogel (1,924 m) that leads to the summit cross without any real difficulties in 2.5 hours. More challenging is the northern route which departs from Durchholzen. As far as the Winkel cirque the path is problem-free, but from there on there is a klettersteig (A/B) to the summit. The walking time is three hours in total. In places there is a risk of major rockfalls on this route.
