= Naunspitze =

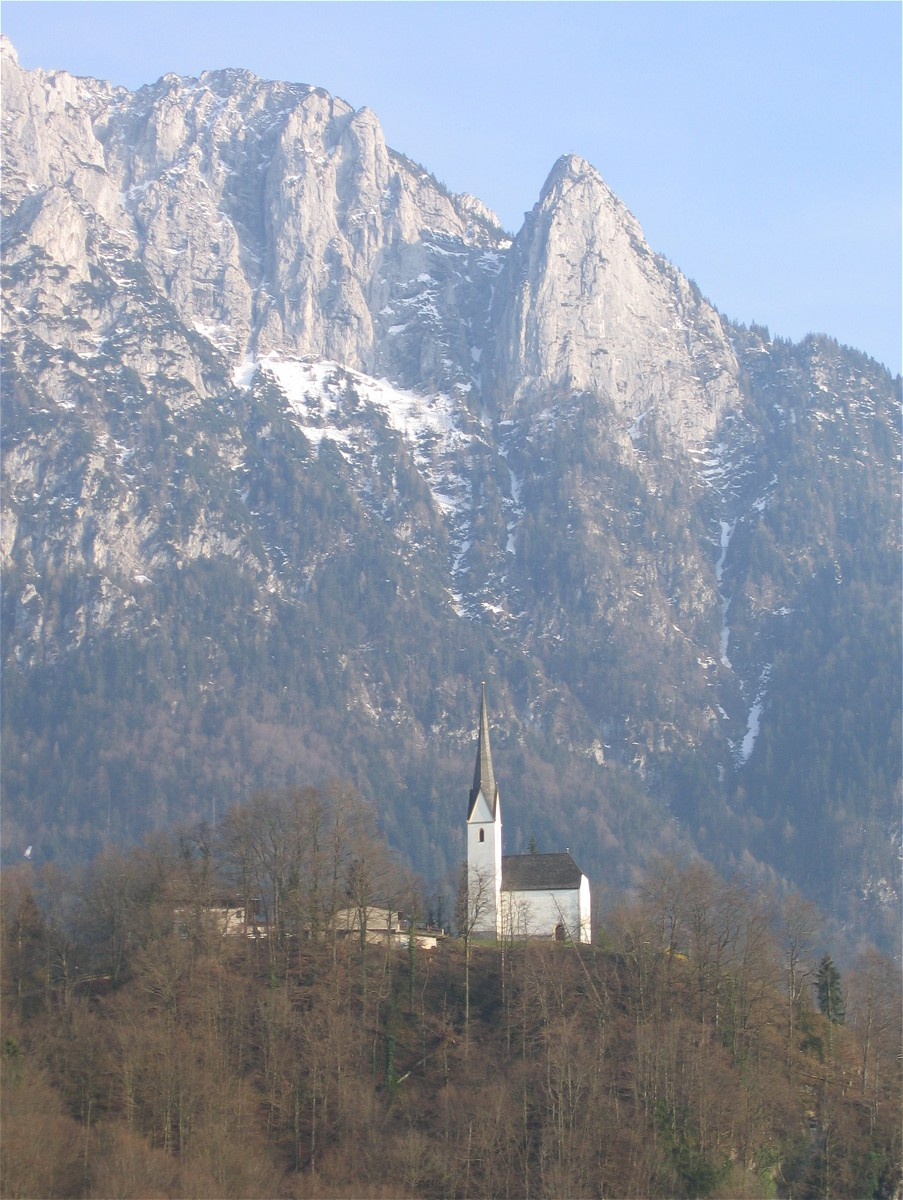
- Church of St. Nicholas in Ebbs, with the Naunspitze (right)

Highest point
- Elevation: 1,633 m (AA) (5,358 ft)
- Coordinates: 47°36′00″N 12°14′00″E

Geography
- Location within Tyrol, Austria
- Location: Tyrol, Austria
- Parent range: Kaiser Mountains

The Naunspitze is a 1,633-metre (5,358 ft) peak in the Zahmer Kaiser, the northern ridge of the Kaiser Mountains in Tyrol, Austria. Viewed from the west, it is the first independent summit on the main crest. To the south it falls sharply away and, to the north, ends abruptly in a steep rock face that towers over the Inn valley near Ebbs. The next peak along the main ridge to the east is the Petersköpfl (1745m), which is separated from the Naunspitze by a small wind gap.

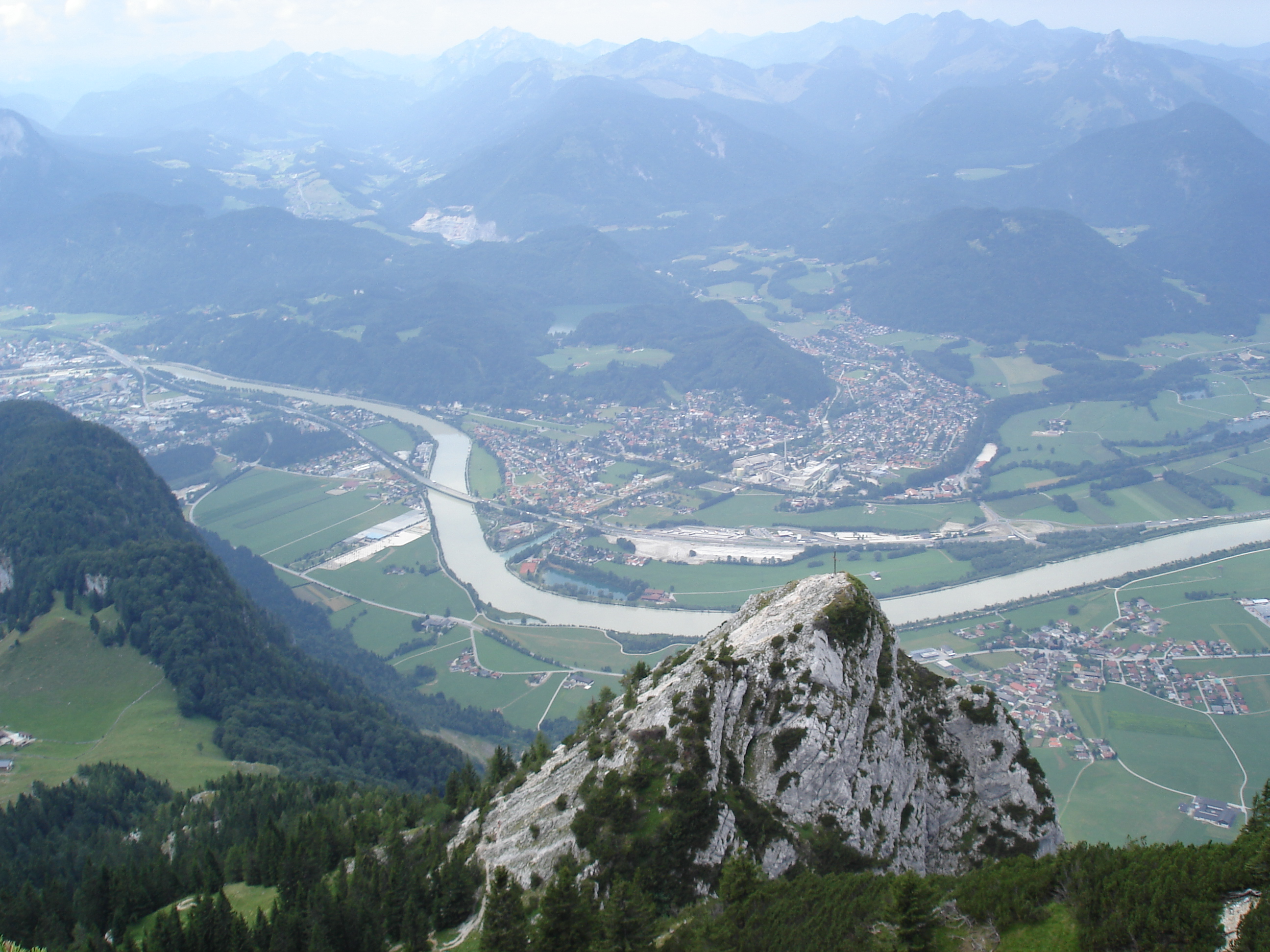
View from Petersköpfl over the Naunspitze, to Kiefersfelden way down in the Inn valley

== Ascents ==
The Naunspitze may be reached without difficulty in about 45 minutes from the Vorderkaiserfelden Hut to the southwest, or in 20 minutes from the Petersköpfl. Several Alpine climbing routes lead up the rock faces to the north and west classified by the UIAA as grade III.
