= Schwarzenbach (Weißach) =

River in Germany

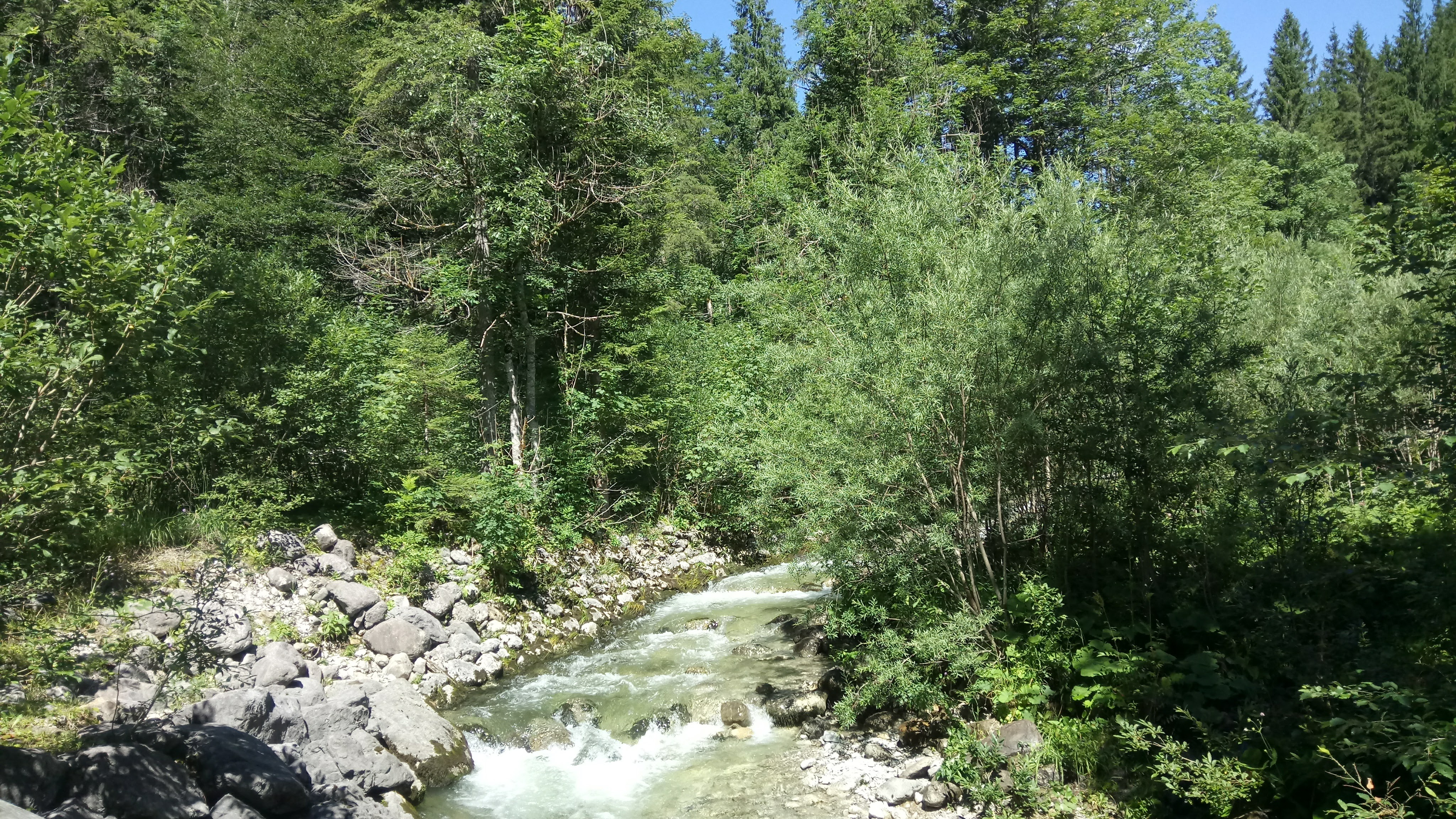
- The Schwarzenbach

Location
- Country: Germany
- States: Bavaria

Physical characteristics
- Mouth
  - location: Weißach
  - coordinates: 47.6215°N 11.7134°E

Basin features
- Progression: Weißach→ Mangfall→ Inn→ Danube→ Black Sea

Schwarzenbach (German pronunciation: [ˈʃvaʁtsn̩ˌbax]) is a river of Bavaria, Germany. It is a left tributary of the Weißach near Kreuth.

== See also ==
- List of rivers of Bavaria
