= Fischbach (Linder) =

River in Germany

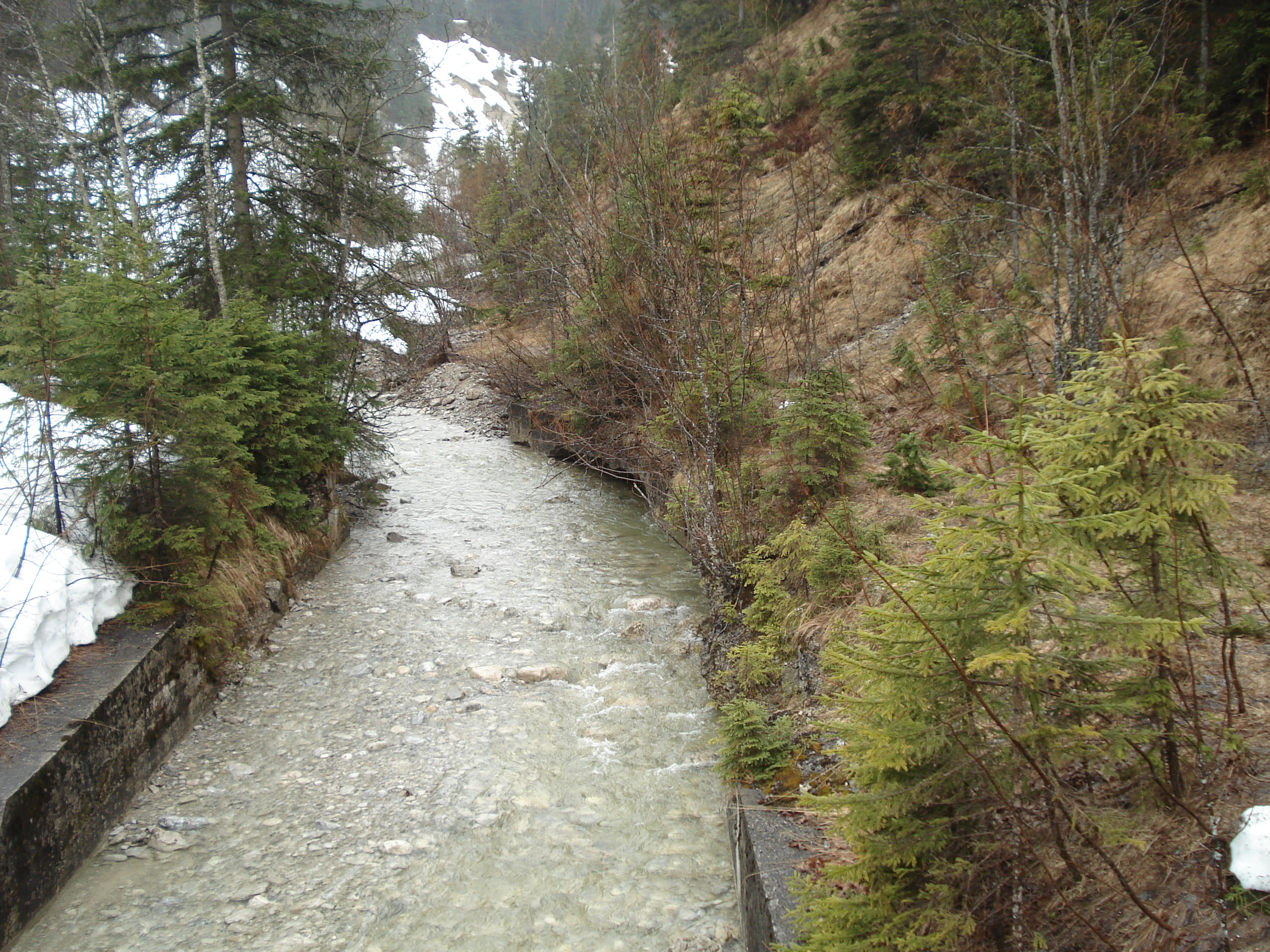
- The Fischbach between Austria (left) and Germany (right)

Location
- Countries: Germany; Austria
- States: Bavaria; Tyrol

Physical characteristics
- Mouth
  - location: confluence with the Neualmbach in the Ettaler Forst between Reutte and Oberammergau, forming the Linder
  - coordinates: 47.5374°N 10.8903°E

Basin features
- Progression: Linder→ Amper→ Isar→ Danube→ Black Sea

Fischbach (German pronunciation: [ˈfɪʃˌbax]) is a river of the Ammergau Alps, southwest of Oberammergau, in Bavaria, Germany and at the border between Bavaria and Tyrol, Austria.

The Fischbach is the left headwater of the Linder. The confluence with the other headstream, the Neualmbach, is in the Ettaler Forst between Reutte and Oberammergau.

== See also ==
- List of rivers of Bavaria
- List of rivers of Austria
