= Petersköpfl =

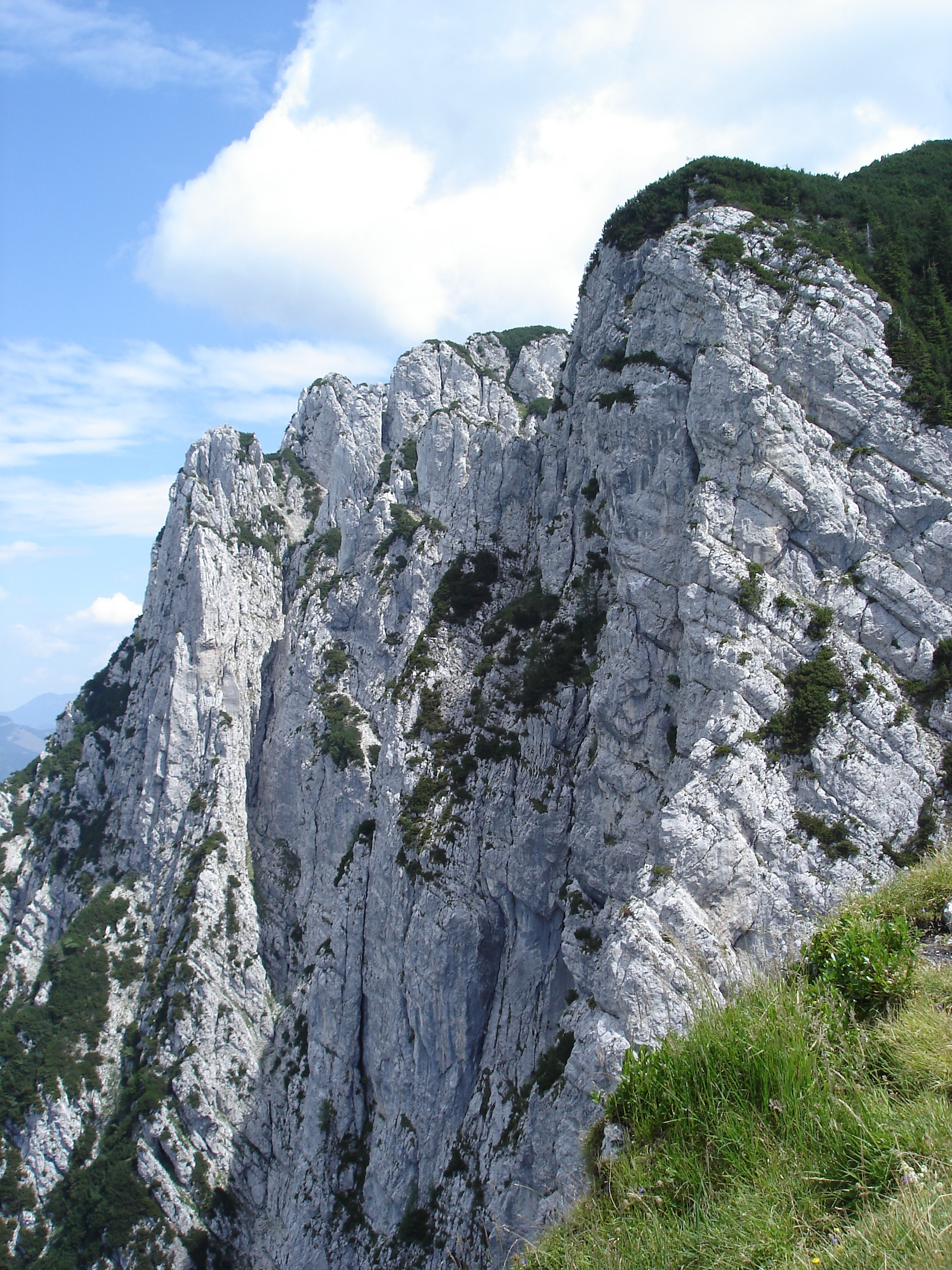
- The north face of the Petersköpfl seen from the Naunspitze

Highest point
- Elevation: 1,745 m (AA) (5,725 ft)
- Coordinates: 47°36′34″N 12°14′48″E

Geography
- Location within Austria
- Location: Tyrol, Austria
- Parent range: Kaisergebirge

The Petersköpfl is a 1,745-metre-high (5,725 ft) summit in the Zahmer Kaiser, the northern ridge of the Kaisergebirge mountain range in the Austrian state of Tyrol. To the east, the Petersköpfl is linked by a ridge to the Einserkogel; to the west it is separated from the Naunspitze by a wind gap. To the south it falls steeply into the Kaisertal valley and to the north its steep rock faces tower above Ebbs. To the east there is a gently sloping plateau covered with mountain pine that forms the main ridge of the Zahmer Kaiser and runs up to the Pyramidenspitze.

== Ascents ==
From the Vorderkaiserfelden Hut the Petersköpfel is reached in an hour on an easy route and, similarly, from the Hinterkaiserfeldenalm. The crossing to the neighbouring summit of the Naunspitze takes 20 minutes. From Petersköpfl a climbing path runs over the plateau of the Zahmer Kaiser to the Pyramidenspitze. Several short climbing routes run up a small rock slab on its western flank. Longer Alpine climbs run up its north face.
