= Neualmbach =

River in Germany

Neualmbach Neualpbach
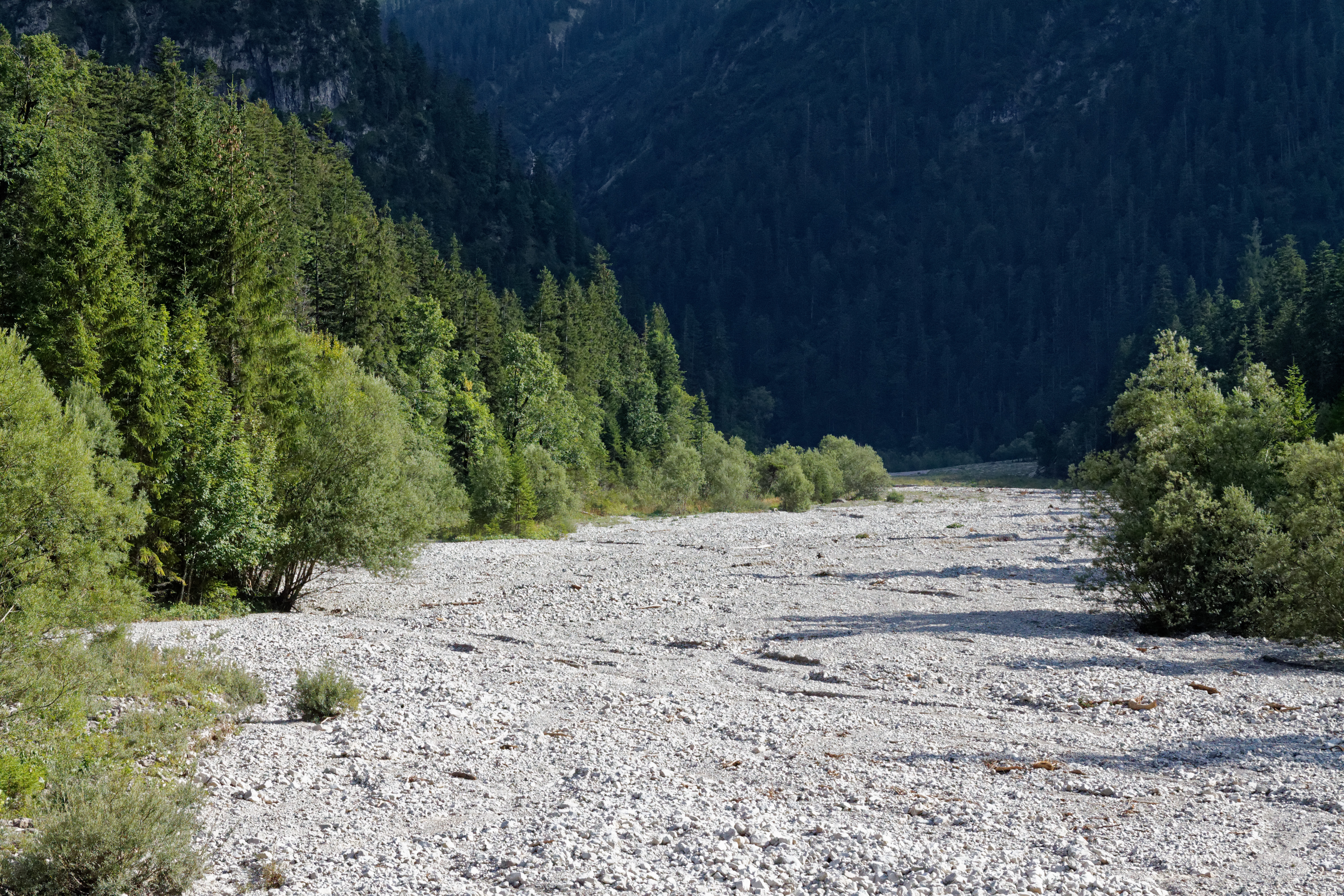
- River bed of the Neualmbach shortly before its confluence with the Fischbach

Location
- Countries: Austria and Germany
- States: Tyrol and Bavaria

Physical characteristics
- Source
  - coordinates: 47.5194°N 10.9158°E
- Mouth
  - location: confluence with the Fischbach in the Ettaler Forst between Reutte and Oberammergau, forming the Linder
  - coordinates: 47.5374°N 10.8903°E

Basin features
- Progression: Linder→ Amper→ Isar→ Danube→ Black Sea

The Neualmbach, also called Neualpbach, is a river which lies in its entire course on the border between Bavaria, Germany, and Tyrol, Austria, in the Ammergau Alps.

The Neualmbach is the right headwater of the Linder. The confluence with the other headstream, the Fischbach, is in the Ettaler Forst between Reutte and Oberammergau.

== See also ==
- List of rivers of Austria
- List of rivers of Bavaria
