= Thiersee Lake =

Lake in Tyrol, Austria

Thiersee
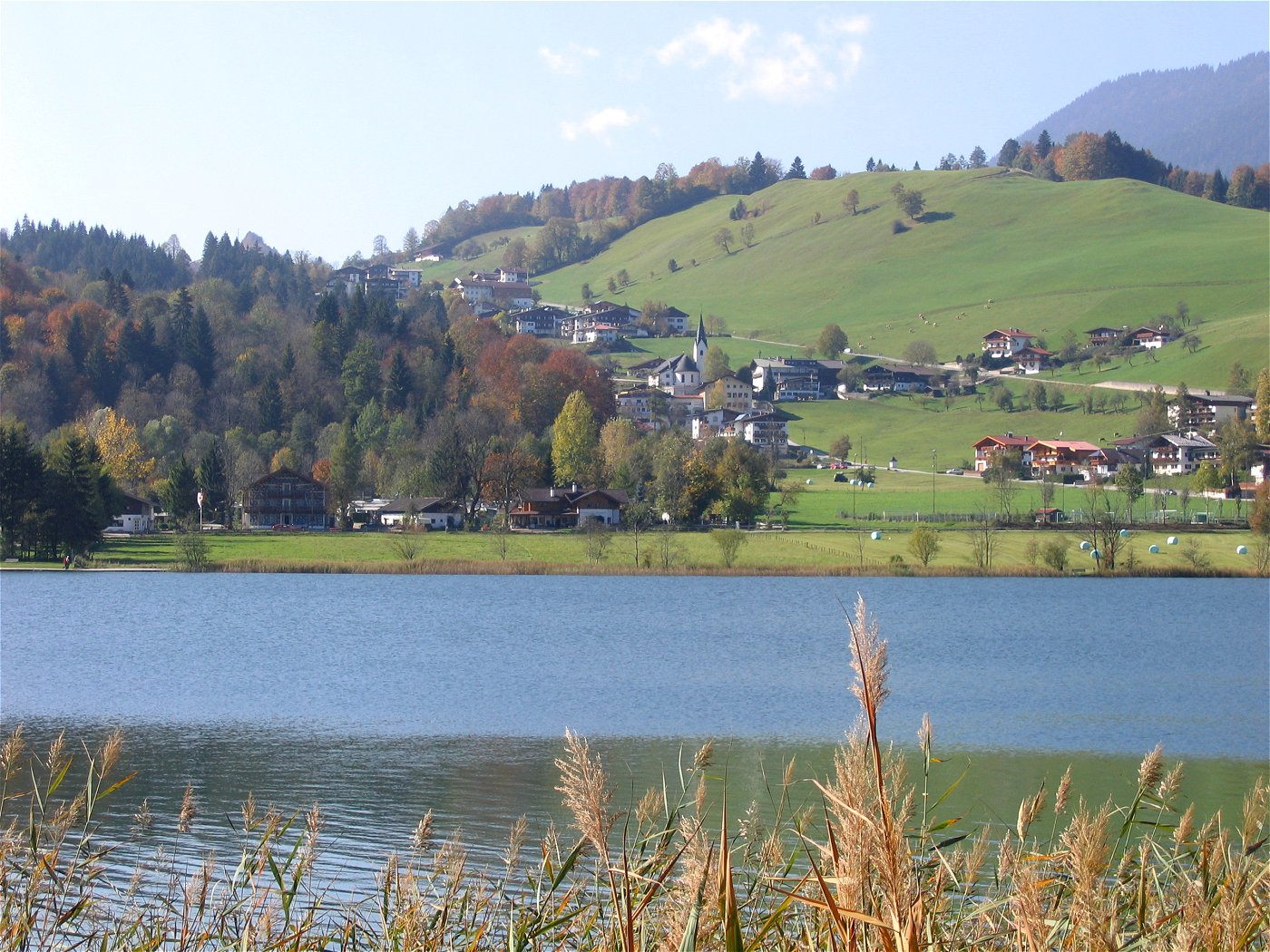

- Location within Tyrol, Austria
- Location: Tyrol
- Coordinates: 47°35′22″N 12°07′17″E
- Primary outflows: Thiersee Ache
- Basin countries: Austria
- Surface area: 26 ha (64 acres)
- Surface elevation: 616 m (2,021 ft)

The Thiersee Lake lies in the center of Vorderthiersee in the valley with the same name on a height of 616 m. It is surrounded by mountains forming a kettle. The lake can be reached by car or by local bus from Kufstein via the valley.

The Lake can be used for bathing and possesses an excellent water quality of Grade A. Several possibilities like boat trips, swimming, Beach volley and others are given. The best conditions are in June because in Summer the water can warm up to 24 °C. Several small creeks provide the Lake with fresh water. The Thiersee Ache drains the Lake, has a length of 7 km, which merges with the Inn River anew.

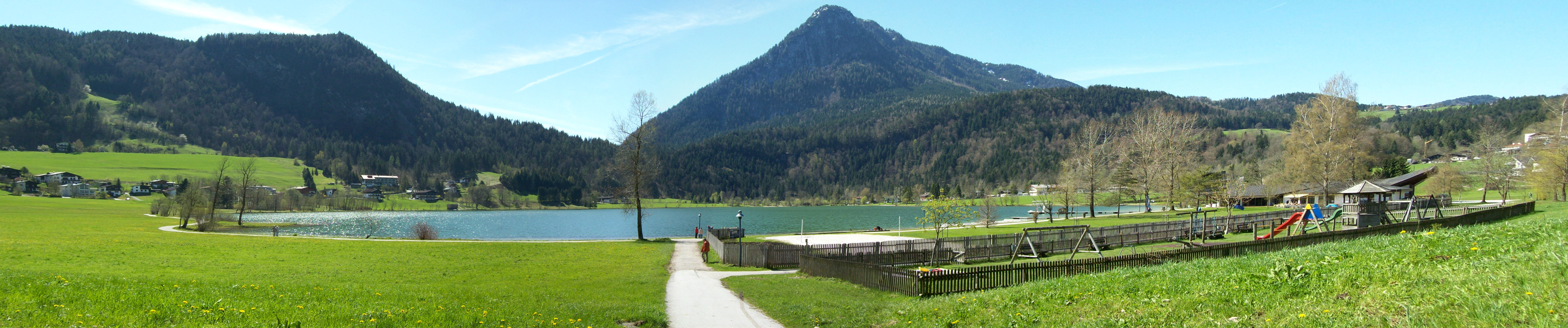
