= Rannasee =

- Rannastausee
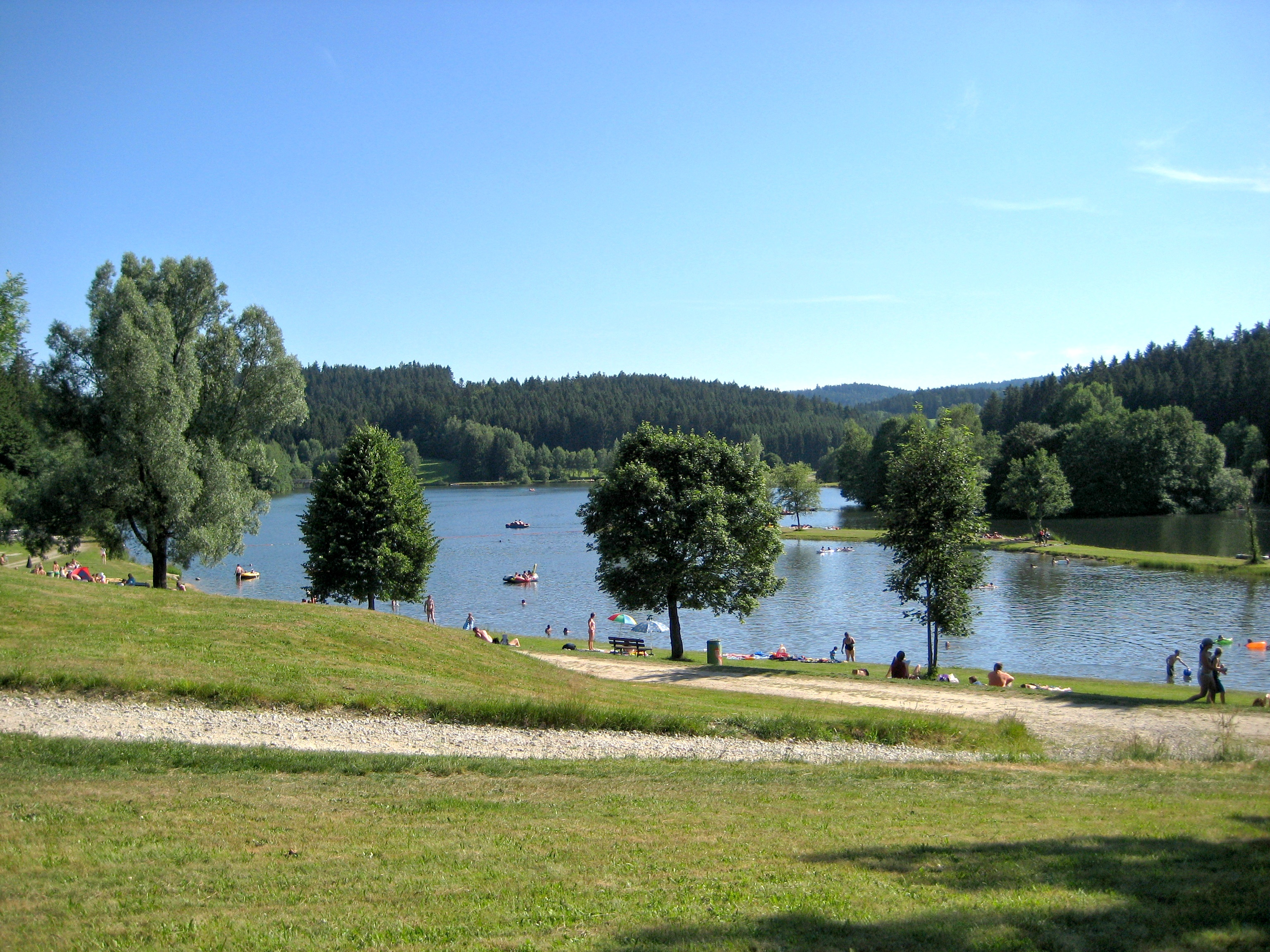
- Rannasee in 2007, as seen from the northeast shore

- Location within Bavaria
- Location: Rohrbach, Upper Austria, Austria & Passau, Bavaria, Germany
- Coordinates: 48°34′8″N 13°45′38″E
- Type: Lake
- Surface area: 0.2 km^{2} (0.077 sq mi)
- Max. depth: 8 m (26 ft)
- Surface elevation: 514 m (1,686 ft)
- Website: Rannasee.de

The Rannasee (or Rannastausee) is an artificial freshwater lake in Austria and in Germany. The reservoir is located along the Ranna River (which forms this part of the border between the two countries) and is the largest lake in the Bavarian Forest

The Rannasee was created in 1983 by damming the southeast corner (at the cost of 6.4 million Deutschmarks) both as a tourist resort and to generate hydro-electric power. The reservoir spans 20 hectares (49 acres) and reaches a maximum depth of 8 metres (26 ft), directly behind the dam. The village of Meierhof occupies the east shore north of the dam.
