= Weißach (Tegernsee) =

River in Bavaria, Germany

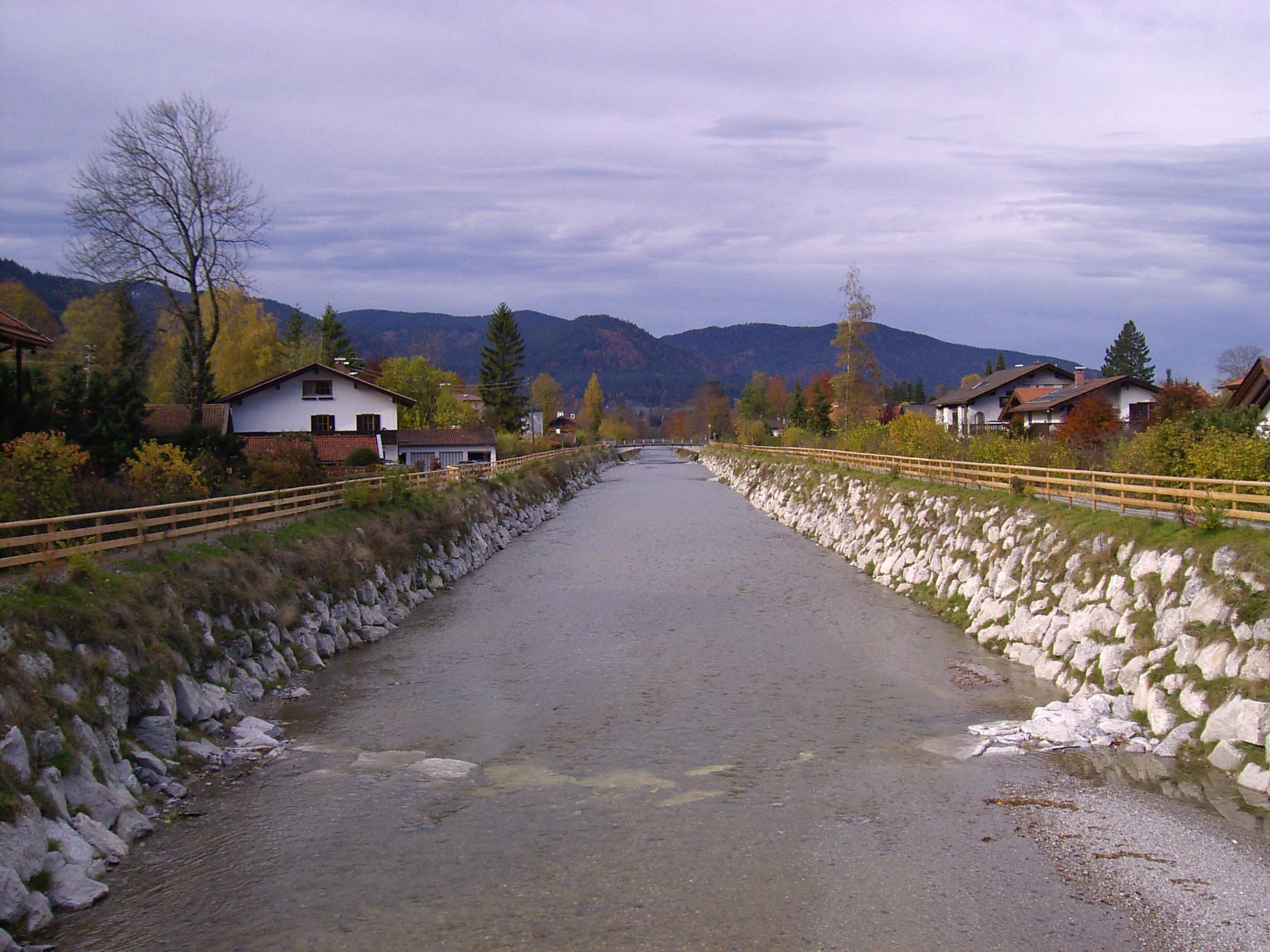
- The Weißach between the municipalities Rottach-Egern and Kreuth

Location
- Country: Germany
- State: Bavaria

Physical characteristics
- Mouth
  - location: Tegernsee
  - coordinates: 47.6949°N 11.7381°E
- Length: 23.5 km (14.6 mi)

Basin features
- Progression: Mangfall→ Inn→ Danube→ Black Sea

Weißach is a river of Bavaria, Germany. It flows into the Tegernsee, which is drained by the Mangfall, near Rottach-Egern.

== See also ==
- List of rivers of Bavaria
