= Durchholzen =

- village
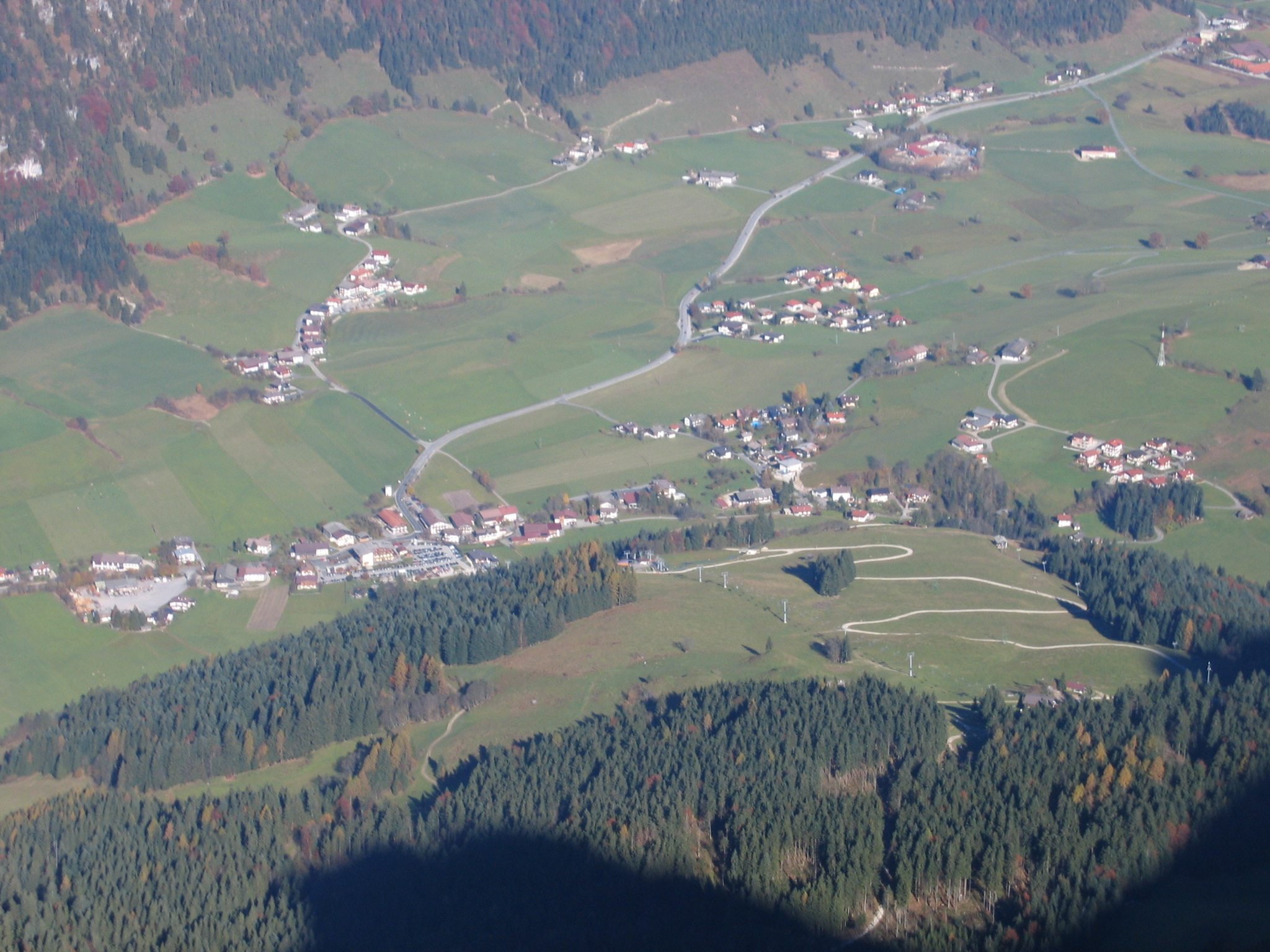
- Durchholzen seen from the Zahmer Kaiser mountains

- Location within Austria
- Coordinates: 47°38′18″N 12°17′15″E
- Country: Austria
- State: Tyrol
- District: Kufstein
- Municipality: Walchsee
- Elevation: 691 m (2,267 ft)
- Time zone: UTC+1 (CET)
  - Summer (DST): UTC+2 (CEST)
- Postal code: 6344
- Area code: 05374
- Vehicle registration: KU

Durchholzen is a village in the municipality of Walchsee in the Austrian state of Tyrol and has 570 inhabitants.

== Geography ==
Durchholzen lies around 3 km southwest of the municipal centre of Walchsee. The lowest point in the parish is Durchholzen (Schmiedtal) at 650 m, the highest is the Pyramidenspitze mountain at 1,999 m above sea level (AA)

Besides the village of Durchholzen, the hamlet of Seetal, the settlements of Sonnleiten and Liesfeld, and several individual farmsteads and alms are also within the parish.

The street names in the village are Durchholzen, Hochberg, Kaiserweg, Liesfeld, Lindenweg, Moosen und Sonnleiten.

== History ==
Durchholzen is first mentioned around 1141 on the occasion of a transfer of ownership to Wessobrunn Abbey, where it is recorded as Durchholsen. In the oldest Bavarian ducal urbarium, which dates to 1231/34, it is recorded within the abbey's estate as Durchholtz.

== Tourism ==
In summer the Sommerrodelbahn and a play park are the tourist attractions of the village, in winter the main draws are the ski slopes and lifts on the Zahmer Kaiser.
