= Aschauer =

Aschauer (toponymic surname given to someone who lived near a prominent ash tree) is a surname. Notable people with the surname include:

- Alexander Aschauer (born 1992), Austrian footballer
- Bernhard Aschauer (born 1945), German luger
- Verena Aschauer (born 1994), Austrian footballer
