= Kiefersfelden =

- Municipality
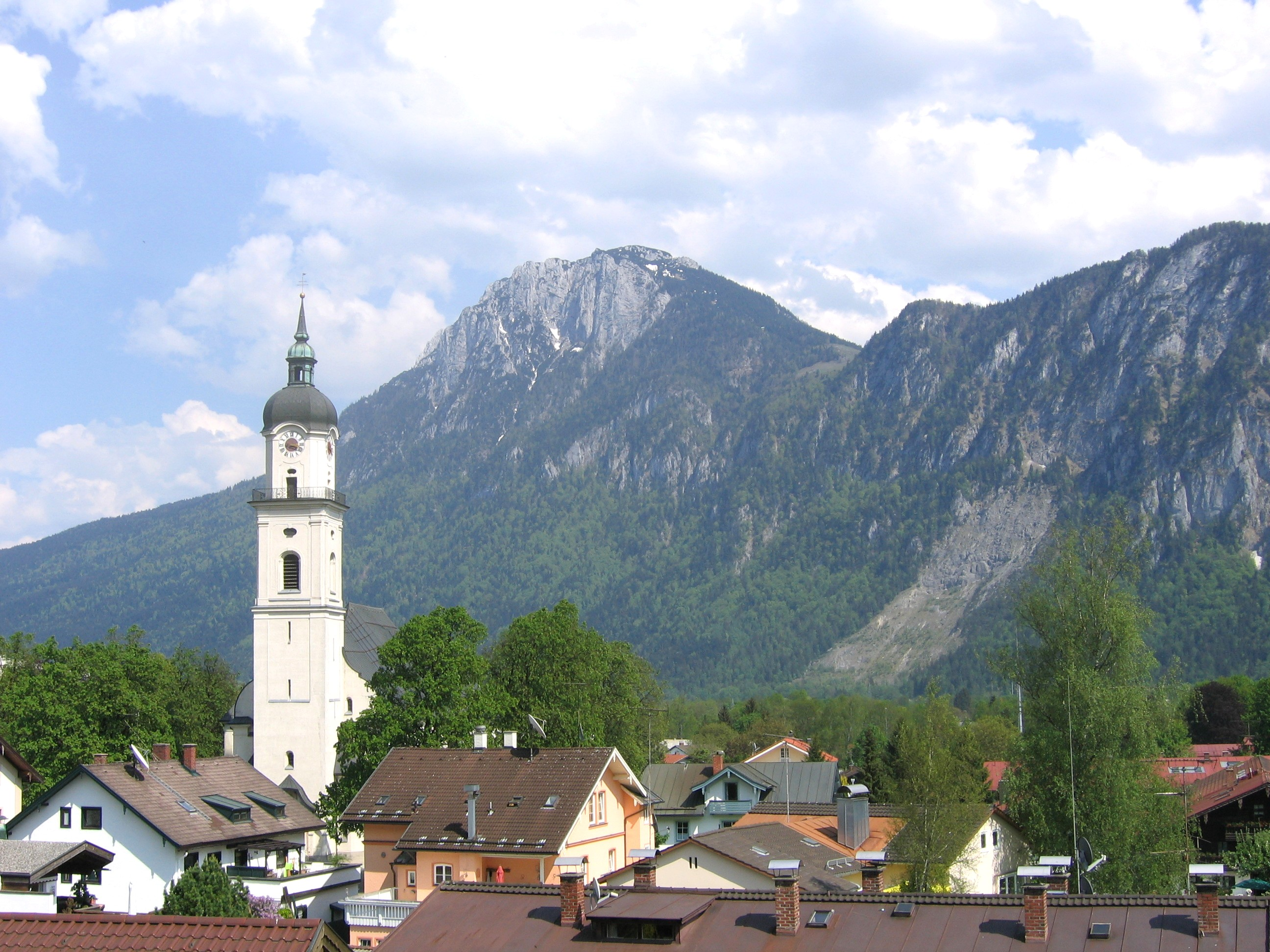
- Church of the Holy Cross in Kiefersfelden with Kaiser Mountains in the background

- Coat of arms

- Location of Kiefersfelden within Rosenheim district
- Interactive map of Kiefersfelden
- Location within Germany Location within Bavaria
- Coordinates: 47°37′N 12°11′E
- Country: Germany
- State: Bavaria
- Admin. region: Oberbayern
- District: Rosenheim

Government
  - Mayor (2020–26): Hajo Gruber

Area
  - Total: 36.74 km^{2} (14.19 sq mi)
- Elevation: 490 m (1,610 ft)

Population (2025-12-31)
  - Total: 6,443
  - Density: 175.4/km^{2} (454.2/sq mi)
- Time zone: UTC+01:00 (CET)
  - Summer (DST): UTC+02:00 (CEST)
- Postal codes: 83088
- Dialling codes: 08033
- Vehicle registration: RO
- Website: www.kiefersfelden.de

Kiefersfelden (German pronunciation: [kiːfɐsˈfɛldn̩]) is a municipality with about 7,000 inhabitants located in the district of Rosenheim in Bavaria, southern Germany, on the border with Tyrol, Austria.

== Geography ==
=== Geographical location ===
Kiefersfelden is located in the foothills of the Alps, in the Bavarian part of the Unterinntal, at an altitude of about 484 m (1,587.93 ft) ASL.

The local rivers are the Inn and the Kieferbach.

=== Communities ===
- Althäusl (Einöde)
- Au (Weiler)
- Breitenau (Weiler)
- Gfallermühle (Dorf)
- Guggenau (Einöde)
- Hödenau (Weiler)
- Kiefersfelden (Pfarrdorf)
- Kohlstatt (Dorf)Köln (Weiler)
- Mühlau (Weiler)
- Mühlbach (Dorf)
- Nußlberg (Kirchdorf)
- Rechenau (Einöde)
- Ried (Weiler)
- Schöffau (Dorf)
- Troyer (Einöde)
- Wiesen (Weiler)
- Wildgrub (Einöde)

=== Nearby places ===
- Bayrischzell
- Ebbs in Tyrol
- Kufstein in Tyrol
- Oberaudorf
- Thiersee in Tyrol

=== Climate ===
A typical weather feature is the Föhn/Alpine foehn, which ensures periods of fine weather, which, in addition to sudden increases in temperature, is responsible for good visibility, but also for headaches in sensitive people. The average duration of snow cover between 1951/52 and 1995/96 was 92 days (long-term behavior of snow cover in Baden-Württemberg and Bavaria, KLIWA, 2005).

The current weather in Kiefersfelden is recorded at the Kiefersfelden-Gach weather station (part of the German Weather Service measuring network) at 518 m above sea level.
