= Ursprung Pass =

Mountain pass in Austria and Germany

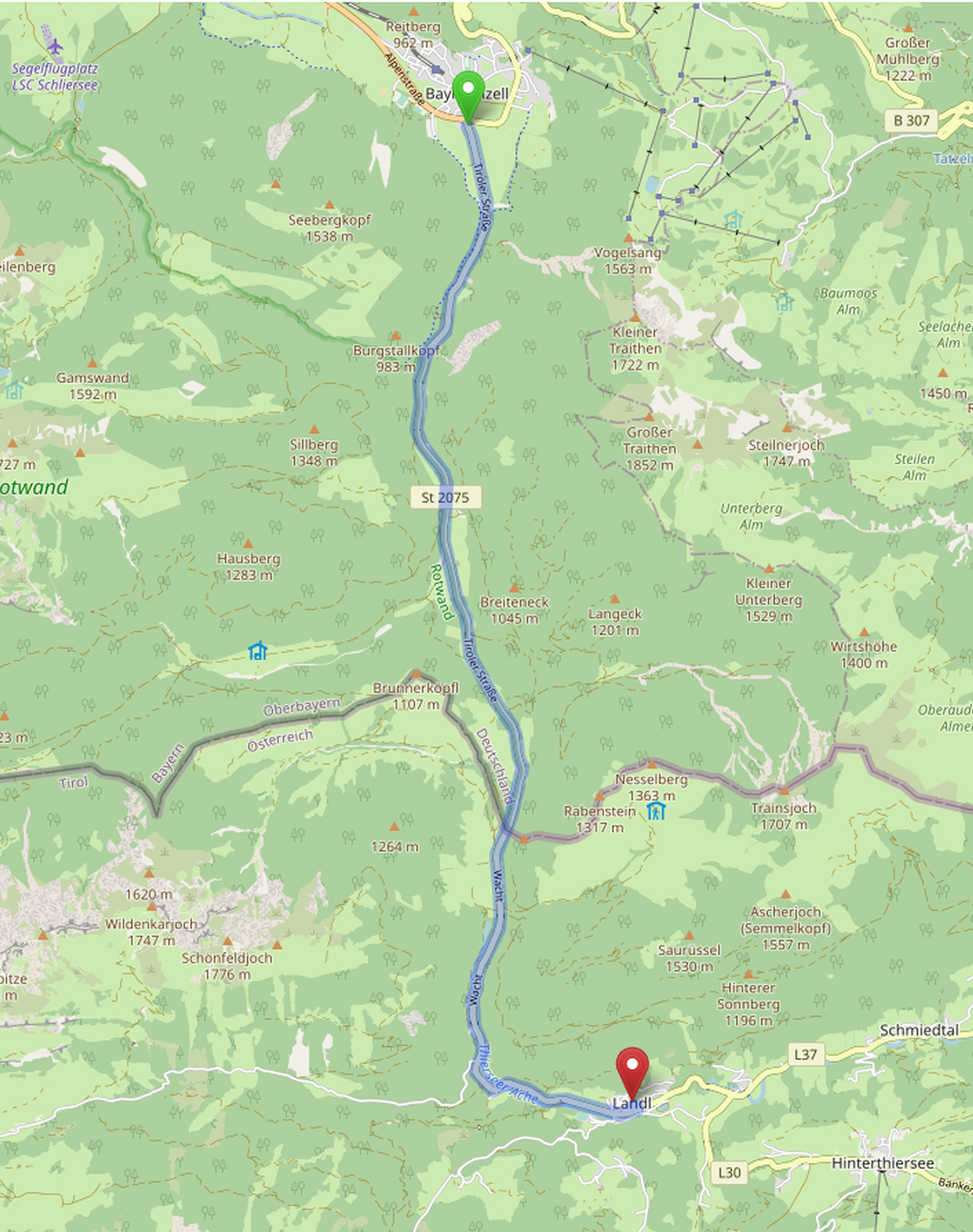

- Location within Alps
- Elevation: 836 metres (2,743 ft)

Third Approach
- Location: Kufstein District, Tyrol, Austria / Miesbach District, Bavaria, Germany
- Range: Alps
- Coordinates: 47°36′43″N 12°1′11″E

Ursprung Pass (836 m) is a mountain pass in the Alps in Austria (Tyrol) and Germany (Bavaria).

It starts 11.5 km west of Kufstein (Tyrol) and connects the Ursprung valley in the north in Bavaria with the Thiersee valley in Tyrol in the south. The pass road has a maximum slope of 13%. Motor vehicles hauling trailers may use the street.

On the western part, a toll road (cyclists free of charge) to Ackernalm may be entered. There is only one restaurant at the road: Zipflwirt (located on the German side; since 1912).

== See also ==
- List of highest paved roads in Europe
- List of mountain passes
