= Linder (river) =

River in Bavaria, Germany

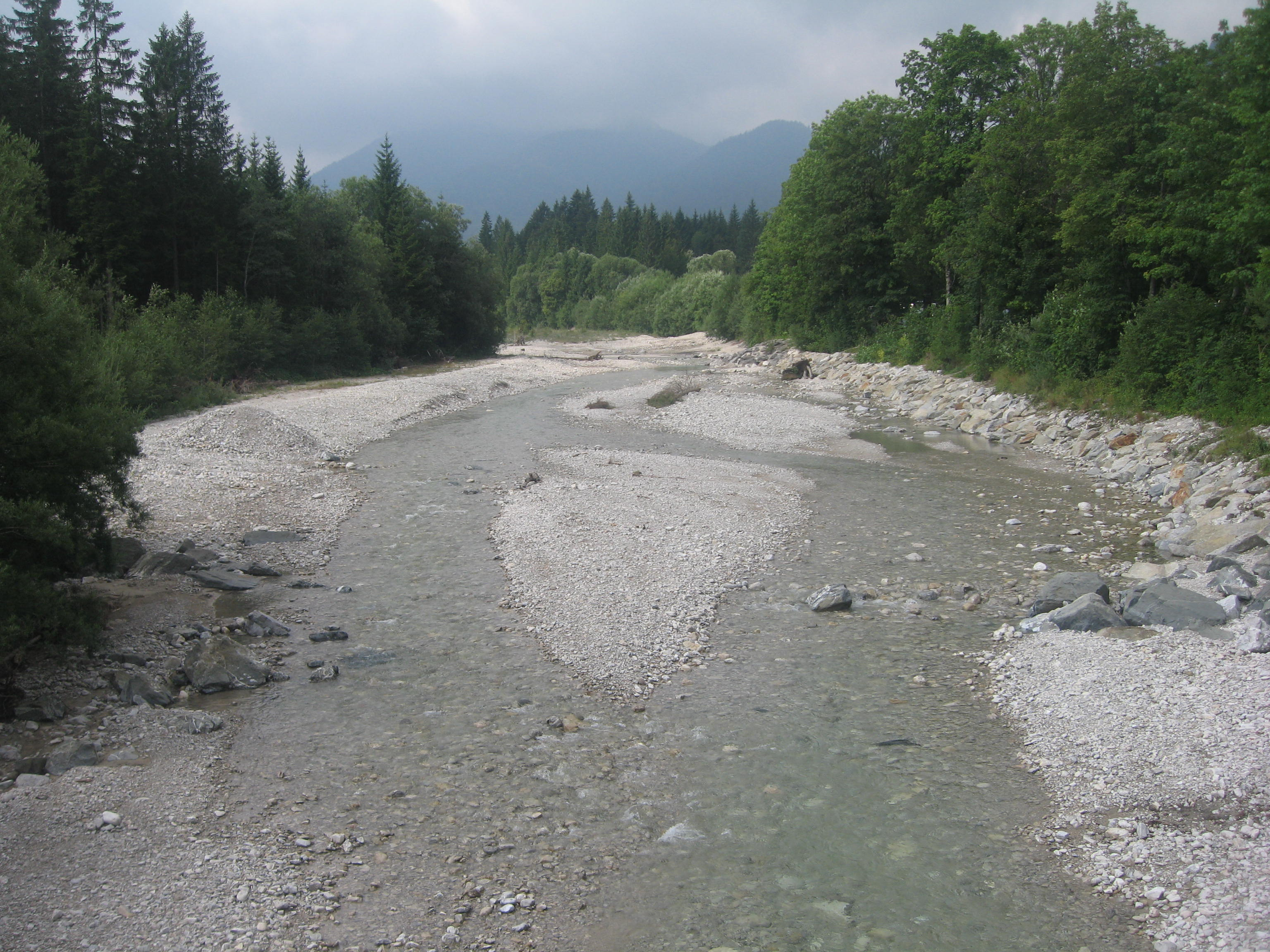

Location
- Country: Germany
- States: Bavaria

Physical characteristics
- Source
  - coordinates: 47.5372°N 10.8899°E
- Mouth
  - location: Ammer
  - coordinates: 47.5694°N 11.0547°E

Basin features
- Progression: Amper→ Isar→ Danube→ Black Sea

The Linder is a river of Bavaria, Germany. It flows into the Ammer near Oberammergau.

== See also ==
- List of rivers of Bavaria
