= Gaudeamus Hut =

Alpine club hut in the Kaisergebirge mountains in Tyrol

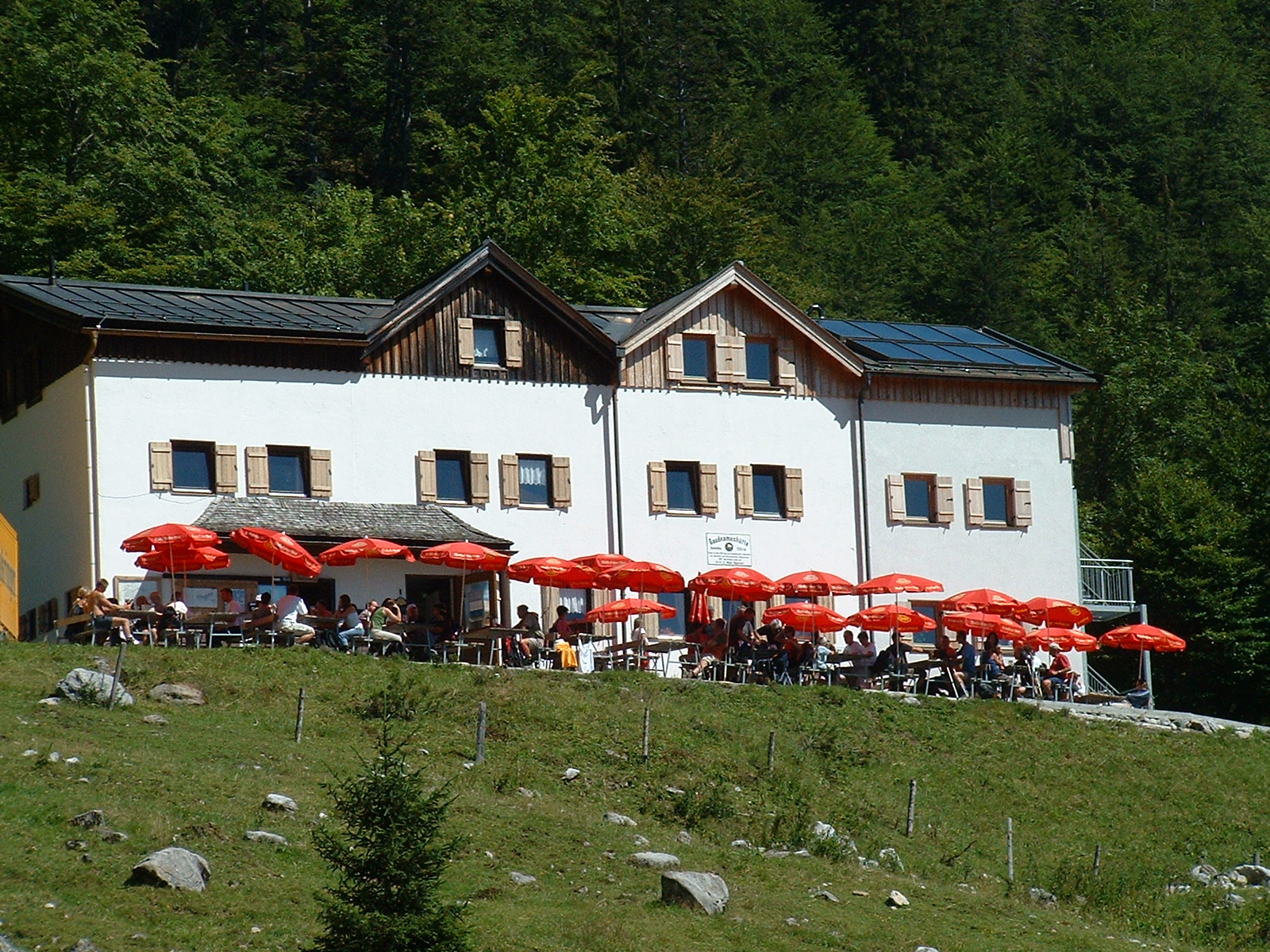
- Interactive map of the Gaudeamus Hut area

General information
- Location: on the southern side of the Wilder Kaiser
- Coordinates: 47.54917°N 12.32472°E
- Elevation: 1,270 m (4,170 ft)
- Year built: 1899
- Owner: German Alpine Club (DAV) - Main-Spessart Section

Website
- dav-main-spessart.de/gaudeamus.html

The Gaudeamus Hut (German: Gaudeamushütte) is an Alpine club hut in the Kaisergebirge mountains in Tyrol. It is run by the Main-Spessart section of the German Alpine Club.

== Location ==
The hut is located on the southern side of the Wilder Kaiser at a height of 1,270 metres (4,170 ft) where it stands at the foot of the Törlspitzen peaks on an Alpine pasture. From its sun terrace the view extends from the Ellmauer Tor, over to the Karlspitzen peaks and on to the Ellmauer Halt, the highest mountain in the Kaisergebirge range. Several paths and mountain trails branch off near the Gaudeamus Hut and its central location is the main reason for the popularity of this base both with day trippers and with hillwalkers and climbers. By using the toll road, the hut is quickly reached and acts as a starting point for numerous summit ascents and crossings to other places in the Wilder Kaiser. It is fully staffed from mid-May to mid-October.

== History ==
The Gaudeamus Hut was built in 1899 below the Kübel Cirque (Kübelkar) by the Academic Alpine Club Section of Berlin. It remained unstaffed until 1911, and was then temporarily rented to the Kitzbühel section. In 1924 an avalanche destroyed the hut. In the same year a temporary hut was erected and basic services were provided. In 1927 the Berlin Section built the present hut about 300 metres further east. It survived the Second World War without damage and the tenants changed very rarely. After the war it was taken over by the Main-Spessart section, and the hut was refurbished and extended in 2003. Since the 2004 season Martin and Anni Leichtfried have been the tenants.

== Access ==
The Gaudeamus Hut is very popular with day visitors. To reach the hut by car from the Inn Valley Motorway (A12), take the Kufstein-Süd exit and drive along the B173 and B178. From Salzburg drive through Lofer and St. Johann in Tirol, also along the B178, to Ellmau. Then branch off north and finally join the toll road up to the Wochenbrunner Alm, where there is a large car park at a height of 1,080 metres.

== Approaches ==
By foot, the shortest and quickest way to the hut starts from the Wochenbrunner Alm and runs up to the Gaudeamus Hut in just 30–40 minutes without posing any problems. Equally possible is the ascent from Scheffau, Ellmau or Going-Prama, each taking about 2 hours.

== Crossings ==
- Grutten Hut (1,620 m) via the Klamml (rocky), duration: 1 hour
- Stripsenjochhaus (1,577 m) via Ellmauer Tor, the Steinerne Rinne and the Eggersteig trail, duration: 4 hours
- Fritz Pflaum Hut (1,865 m) via Wildererkanzel, Gildensteig and Kleines Törl, duration: 3 hours
- Ackerl Hut (1,460 m) along the Wilder Kaiser Trail (‚‘Steig‘‘), duration: 1½ hours

== Ascents ==
- Goinger Halt (2,242 m), duration: 2½ hours
- Karlspitzen (2,281 m), duration: 3 hours
- Regalmspitze (2,253 m), duration: 3 hours
- Ackerlspitze (2,329 m), duration: 4 hours
- Maukspitze (2,231 m), duration: 3½ hours
- Ellmauer Halt (2,344 m), duration: 4 hours

== See also ==
- Gaudeamus

== Sources and maps ==
- Horst Höfler, Jan Piepenstock: Alpenvereinsführer alpin Kaisergebirge, Rother Verlag Ottobrunn, ISBN 978-3-7633-1257-3
- Pit Schubert: Alpenvereinsführer extrem Kaisergebirge, Rother Verlag Ottobrunn, ISBN 978-3-7633-1272-6
- Sepp Brandl: Wanderführer Wilder Kaiser, Die schönsten Tal- und Höhenwanderungen, Rother Verlag Ottobrunn, ISBN 978-3-7633-4084-2
