= Lärchegg =

Mountain in Austria

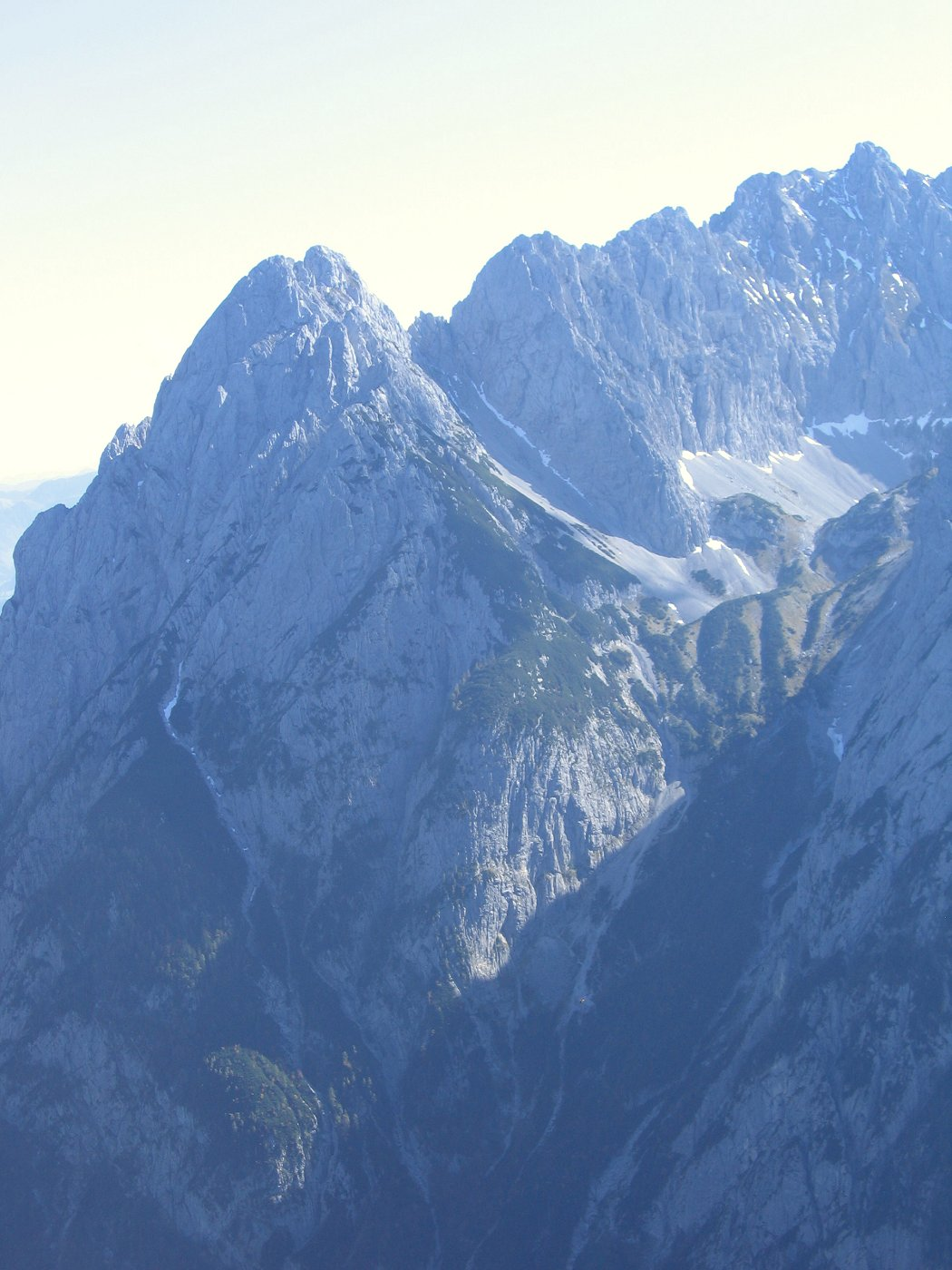
- The Lärchegg seen from the Feldberg

Highest point
- Elevation: 2,123 m (AA) (6,965 ft)
- Coordinates: 47°34′09″N 12°21′05″E

Geography
- Location within Austria
- Location: Tyrol, Austria
- Parent range: Kaisergebirge

Climbing
- Normal route: Pine oil distillery (Latschenölbrennerei) / Fritz Pflaum Hut - Kleines Griesner Tor - Lärchegg

The Lärchegg (also Lärcheck or Lärcheggspitze) is a 2,123-metre-high (6,965 ft) mountain in the Kaisergebirge range of the Northern Limestone Alps in Austria.

== Location ==
The Lärchegg forms the mighty northeastern buttress of the Wilder Kaiser; its rock faces towering 1,200 metres (3,900 ft) over the Kaiserbach valley. It belongs to the impressive backdrop of the Ostkaiser ("East Kaiser") and appears from all sides as a narrow rock pyramid. To the south it is joined to the high peaks of the Ackerlspitze and Maukspitze.

== Approaches ==
The normal route to the summit of the Lärchegg is challenging and should not be underestimated. Only experienced mountaineers with good fitness, sure-footedness, a head for heights and climbing agility should risk the ascent.

The base in the Kaiserbach valley is the pine oil distillery (Latschenölbrennerei, 900 m) between the Fischbachalm and the Griesner Alm (car parks on the toll road from Griesenau). The signposted mountain path climbs steeply into the Kleine Griesner Tor, a rock-strewn cirque. From there it branches off, unsigned, to the left; the main path carries on to the Fritz Pflaum Hut. From here to the summit there are only occasional and very faded signs (as at 2009) and the danger of falling rocks is ever present. The route traces a way roughly through the middle of an extremely steep, unstable scree slope to about 1,850 metres on the rock face of the summit block. There the climbing path leads up out of the cirque and runs across steep terrain (Schrofen), bands of rock and steep gullies. At the most difficult spot a cable has been fixed to which climbers must attach themselves. Immediately thereafter, is a challenging, unsecured grade II climb. In front of a rocky ledge (view over to the Chiemsee) the route runs right (view of St. Johann) and then over the north arête to the summit cross. Three hours should be allowed for the whole climb, the descent on this route takes 2.5 hours.

The only base nearby is the Fritz Pflaum Hut, from which one can climb to the Kleine Griesner Tor and then reach the Lärchegg in 2 hours.
