= Fritz Pflaum Hut =

Alpine club hut in the Austrian federal state of Tyrol

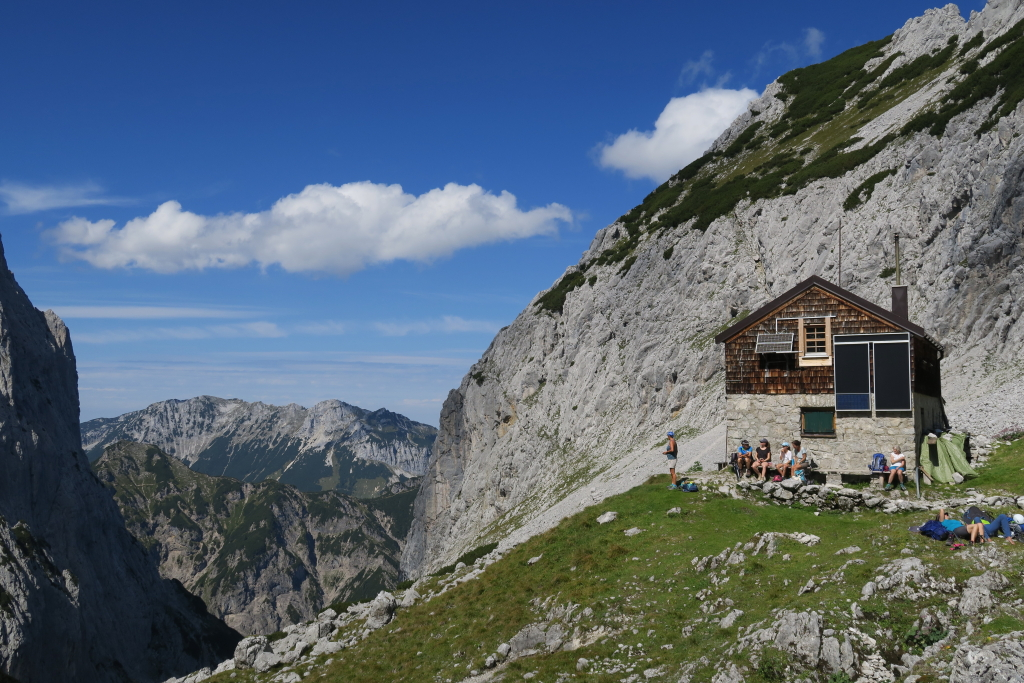
- Interactive map of the Fritz Pflaum Hut area

General information
- Coordinates: 47.56417°N 12.33722°E
- Elevation: 1,865 m (6,119 ft)
- Year built: 1912
- Owner: German Alpine Club (DAV) - Bayerland Section

Website
- www.fritzpflaumhuette.de

The Fritz Pflaum Hut (German: Fritz-Pflaum-Hütte) is an Alpine club hut belonging to the Bayerland Section of the German Alpine Club, located in the Kaisergebirge mountains in the Austrian federal state of Tyrol.

== Location ==
The Fritz Pflaum Hut is an unmanned climbers' hut high above the Kaiserbachtal that lies in the Griesner Cirque (Griesner Kar) at the foot of the Mitterkaiser. It is located at a height of 1,865 metres (6,119 ft) (Note: Reynolds gives its height as 1,868 metres (6,129 ft), the Alpine Club Guide as 1,866 metres (6,122 ft).) and is thus the highest hut in the Wilder Kaiser. It is accessible with an Alpine Club key (AV-Schlüssel). The hut is a base for all summits around the Griesener Kar bowl as well as a starting point for the Kleinkaiser and Mitterkaiser peaks. It has 23 bedspaces.

Normally there is no caretaker at the hut. A caretaker may be on hand for prearranged group bookings.

== History ==
The hut was named after the Alpinist, Fritz Pflaum, who was born in 1871. He was a keen nature lover and sportsman and loved the Wilder Kaiser. On 25 August 1908 he died during a difficult mountain tour on the Mönch. Relatives, friends and acquaintances donated 8,000 marks for the construction of the Fritz Pflaum Hut, which was opened on 25 August 1912, exactly four years after his death. Subsequent attempts to rename it the Griesnerkar Hut have not succeeded. An attempt to provide a basic managed service in the spring of 2007 failed because of a ban by the district commission.

== Approaches ==
The normal approach to the hut is from the Griesner Alm in the Kaiserbach valley over a good path with numerous bends that takes 2 1/2 hours as a mountain hike and 2 1/4 hours as a ski tour (height difference: 870 metres (2,850 ft)).

The alternative is a rarely used climb from the Fischbachalm, also down in the Kaiserbach valley, via the pine oil distillery (Latschenölbrennerei) and the Kleiner Griesner Tor which takes 2 hours. This route is rather more challenging and requires sure-footedness. Some sections are protected by cable.

== Crossings ==
- Gaudeamus Hut (1,270 m (4,170 ft)), via the Kleines Törl, Gildensteig and Wildererkanzel, duration: 3 1/2 hours
- Ackerl Hut (1,460 m (4,790 ft)), via the Kleines Törl, Gildensteig and Wilder Kaiser Path, duration: 3 hours
- Ackerl Hut (1,460 m (4,790 ft)), via the Ackerlspitze and Maukspitze, challenging, duration: 5 hours
- Grutten Hut (1,620 m (5,310 ft)), via the Kleines Törl, Gildensteig, Wilder Kaiser Path, Jubiläumssteig, duration: 4 hours
- Stripsenjochhaus (1,577 m (5,174 ft)), via the Großes Griesner Tor, Hüttenweg, easy, duration: 2 1/2 hours

== Ascents ==
The following ascents are listed by the DAV:

- Ackerlspitze (2,329 m (7,641 ft)), duration: 2 hours, medium difficulty
- Lärcheck (2,124 m (6,969 ft)), duration: 2¼ hours, difficult
- Mitterkaiser (2,007 m (6,585 ft)), duration: ½-1 hour, medium difficulty
- Regalmspitze (2,249 m (7,379 ft)), duration: 2 hours, difficult
- Maukspitze (2,231 m (7,320 ft)_, duration of crossing: 1 hour, difficult

== Pictures ==
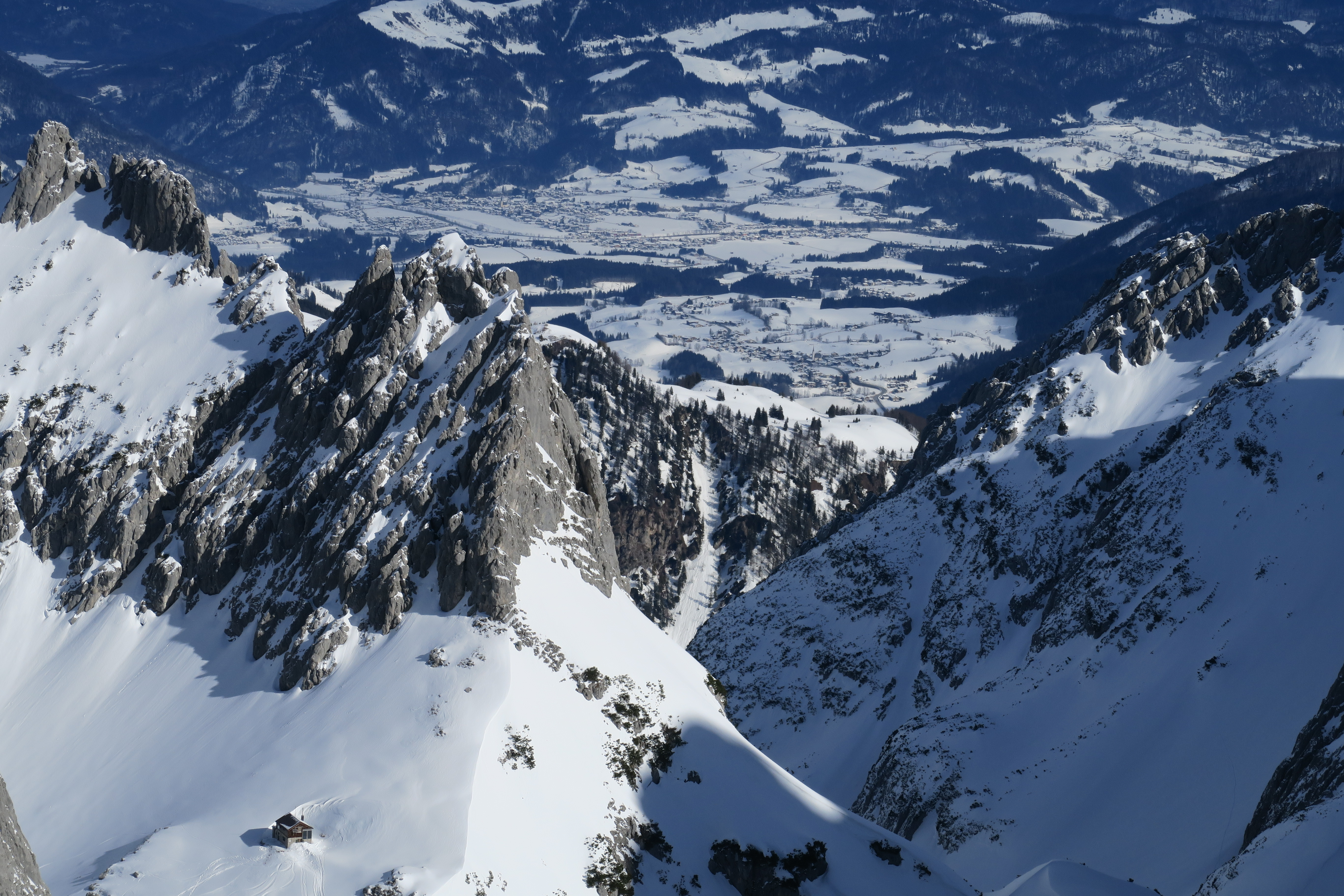
Fritz Pflaum Hut with Mitterkaiser

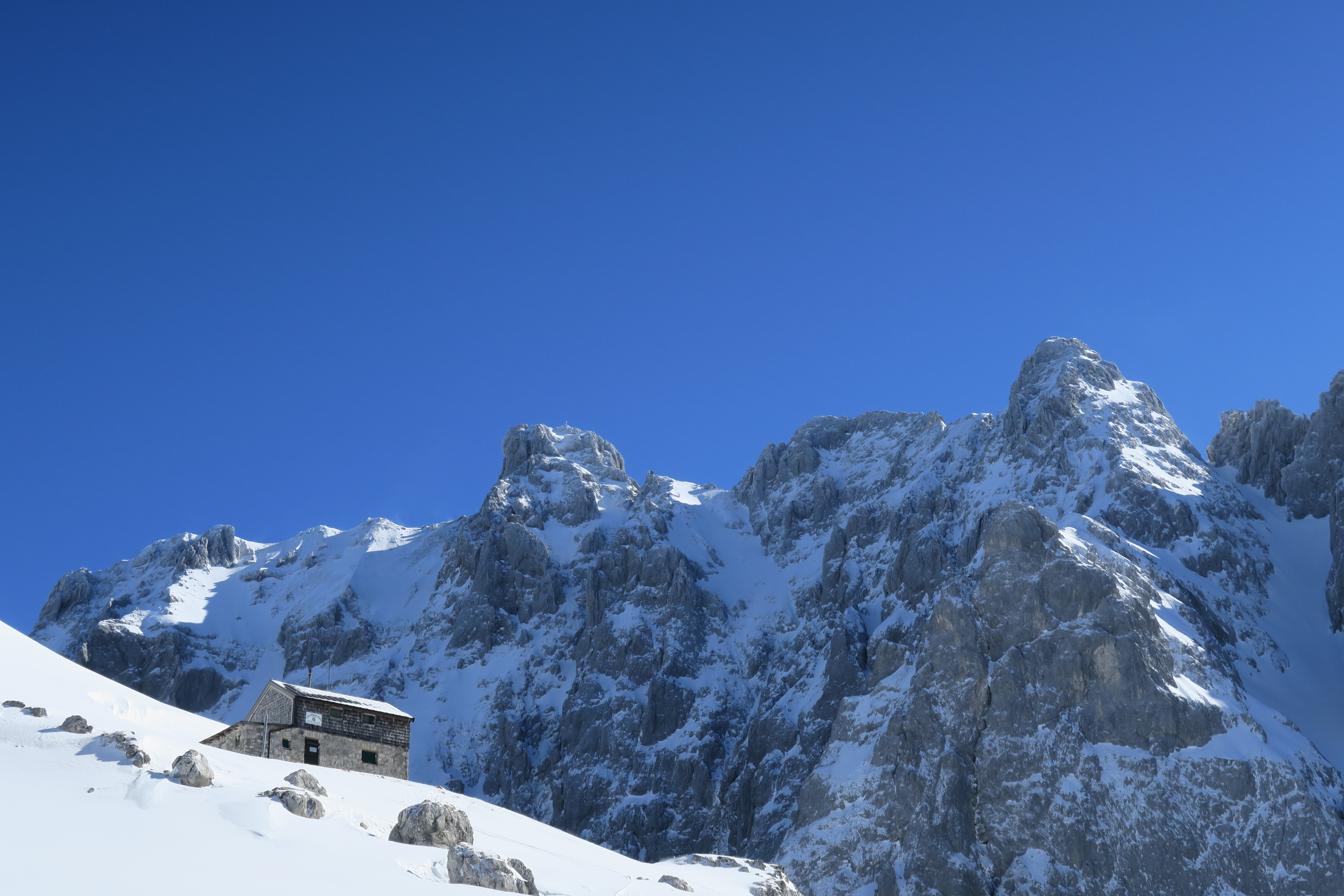
Fritz Pflaum Hut
