= Goinger Halt =

Mountain in Austria

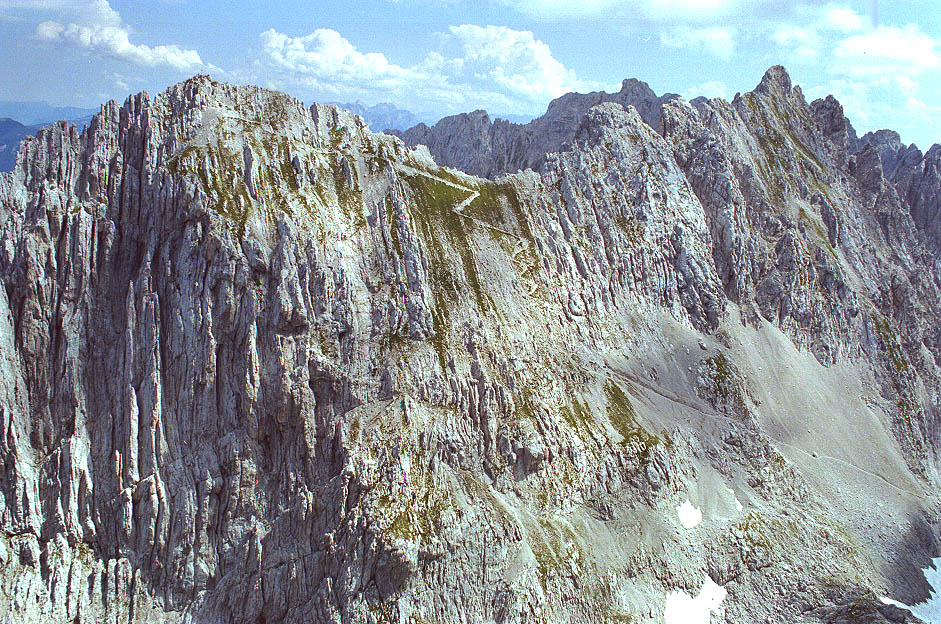
- The Hinterer (left) and Vorderer Goinger Halt (right) from Christaturm in the west. The climb from the Ellmauer Tor to the Hintere Goinger Halt is easily recognisable.

Highest point
- Elevation: 2,242 m (AA) (7,356 ft)
- Coordinates: 47°N 12°E

Geography
- Location within Austria
- Location: Tyrol, Austria
- Parent range: Kaisergebirge

The Goinger Halt is a mountain in the Kaisergebirge range in the Northern Limestone Alps in Austria. It has a double summit: a northern top to the rear, the Hintere Goinger Halt (2,192 metres), and a higher, southern top in front, the Vordere Goinger Halt (2,242 metres). The name "Halt" means something like Alpine meadow and refers therefore to the peak over the meadow areas, that belong to the parish of Going (cf. Ellmauer Halt).

== Location ==
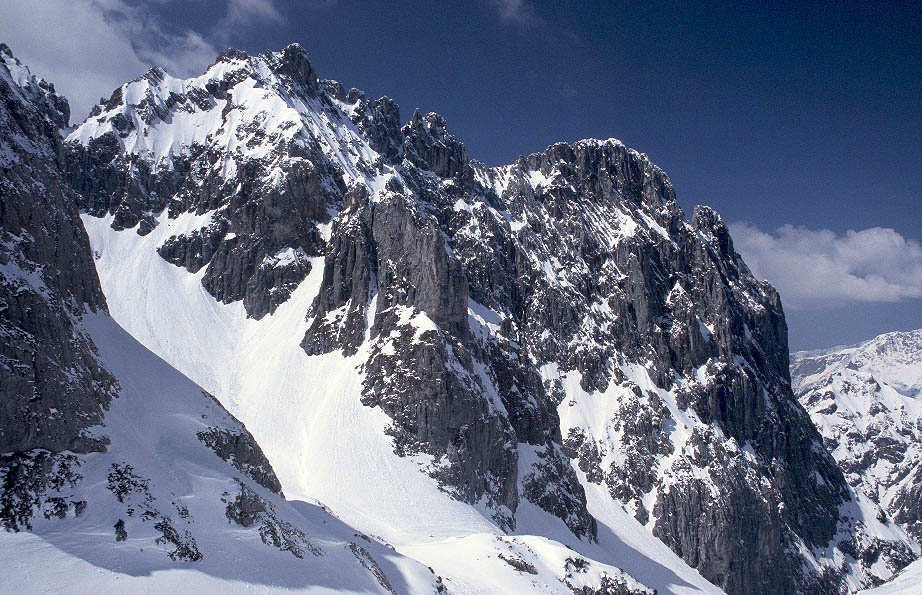
Hintere (right) and Vordere Goinger Halt (left) from the east from the Griesener Cirque

The Goinger Halt climbs immediately east of the Ellmauer Tor from the cirque of the Steinerne Rinne and so lies in the central part of the Kaisergebirge. Opposite it to the west are the peaks of the Karlspitzen and the Fleischbank. To the north the Halt is preceded by the Predigtstuhl. The main crest of the mountain ridge runs away to the southwest, finally culminating in the Ackerlspitze and, to the northwest, steep rock faces plunge into the Griesner Cirque.

== Routes ==
The Hintere Goinger Halt counts as one of the easiest and therefore one of the most frequented peaks in the Wilder Kaiser. Its summit cross may be reached in 40 minutes from the Ellmauer Tor on a straightforward, signed climbing path, although secure footing is required. On fine, summer's days numerous visitors jostle one another on the very small summit.

The Vordere Goinger Halt is clearly more challenging and also accessible from the Ellmauer Tor. The route initially follows the climb to the Hinterer Goinger Halt, but bends right at a wind gap and follows a climbing route, that is only signed by cairns (Steinmandl). Thereafter the route is rocky and exposed; requiring an unsecured UIAA grade II climb. The summit which has a summit register is reached after a good hour and offers not only a wide panorama, but also more peace than the Hintere Goinger Halt.

A popular climbing route at grade III runs from the Predigtstuhl wind gap over the northern arête to the summit of the Hintere Goinger Halt.
