= Karlspitzen =

Twin-peaked mountain in Austria

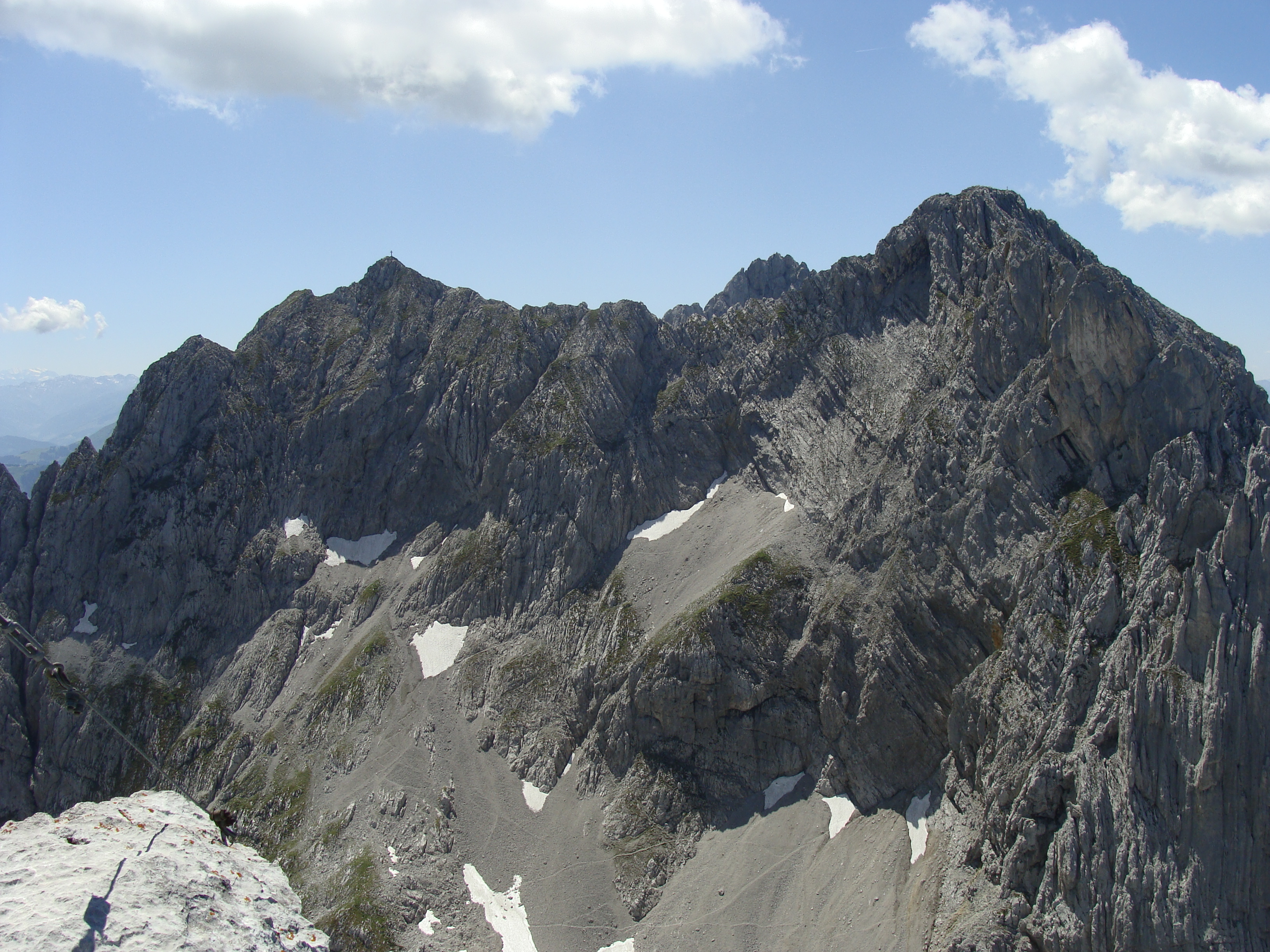
- Vordere and Hintere Karlspitze (in the background Ellmauer Halt) - view from the summit of the Hinteren Goinger Halt, 2011

Highest point
- Elevation: 2,281 m (AA) (7,484 ft)
- Coordinates: 47°33′56″N 12°18′56″E

Geography
- Location within Austria
- Location: Tyrol, Austria
- Parent range: Kaisergebirge

Climbing
- Normal route: Ellmauer Tor – Karlspitzen

The Karlspitzen is a twin-peaked mountain in the middle of the Kaisergebirge range of the Northern Limestone Alps in Austria. The two peaks are the northern Hintere Karlspitze (2,281 m) and the southern Vordere Karlspitze (2,263 m) with its summit cross; they are linked by a sharp, exposed, rocky arête. Seen from the south the Vordere Karlspitze is a huge and very prominent block of rock, whereas the Hintere Karlspitze is hidden behind other (lower) neighbouring mountains.

== Location ==
The Karlspitzen peaks tower over the Ellmauer Tor saddle and Steinerne Rinne couloir to their east and so lie in the heart of the Wilder Kaiser mountains. To the east rise the rather lower summits of the Goinger Halt and Predigtstuhl, immediately to the north are the Fleischbank and Totenkirchl and, further west, separated by the Kopftörl arête, is the higher Ellmauer Halt. Thanks to its location the Karlspitzen have extensive views over both the Wilder Kaiser and also the neighbouring mountain ranges.

== Routes ==
The Karlspitzen are among the more difficult and hence less-frequented summits in the Kaiser. No signposted or secured route runs up to the double peak; all the more reason why Alpine experience, a sense of direction, safe climbing ability and a head for heights are necessary. The normal way starts at the Ellmauer Tor and is only marked by a pair of cairns. Cairns should not be relied on in any case, many are misleading. However, traces of the trail are generally easy to recognise. They lead through a rocky and generally steep Schrofen which involves light climbing of up to grade II difficulty. It takes an hour to reach the Karlspitzen arête where the route branches to the Hinterer and Vorderer Karlspitze.
