= Ackerl Hut =

Alpine club hut in Austria

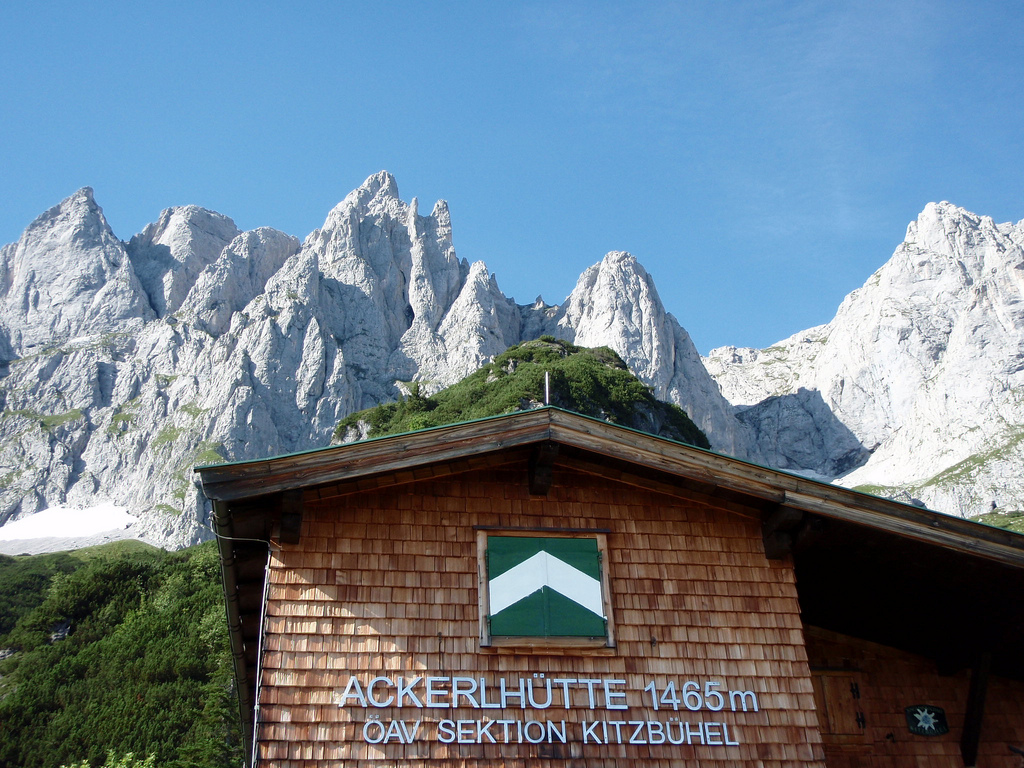
- View of the Kaiser Mountains from the Ackerl Hut
- Interactive map of the Ackerl Hut area

General information
- Location: south of the Ackerlspitze
- Coordinates: 47.54944°N 12.34111°E
- Elevation: 1,456 m (4,777 ft)
- Owner: Kitzbühel Section

The Ackerl Hut (German: Ackerlhütte) is an Alpine club hut in the Wilder Kaiser mountains in Austria. It is run by the Kitzbühel section of the Austrian Alpine Club and lies at a height of 1,455 metres (4,774 ft) (according to other sources 1,456 m or 1,465 m) below the south faces of the Regalmspitze, Ackerlspitze and Maukspitze.

== Facilities ==
It is a self-service hut with 15 mattresses that serves as a base for mountaineers and climbers. From June to September the Ackerl Hut is managed, at a least at weekends, otherwise it is not open and only accessible with an Alpine Club key.

== Approaches ==
- From Hüttling/Prama (near Going) via the Graspoint Niederalm and Schleier Waterfall in 2 hours.
- From Wochenbrunner Alm via the Gaudeamus Hut and along the Höhenweg trail in 2 hours.
- From St. Johann in Tirol along the Adlerweg trail, (here known as the Wilder Kaiser Trail (Steig)) in 3 hours.

== Crossings ==
- Gaudeamus Hut (1,270 m) via the Wilder Kaiser Trail, duration: 1 hour
- Fritz Pflaum Hut (1,865 m) via the Ackerlspitze, difficult, duration: 5.5 hours
- Fritz Pflaum Hut (1,865 m) over the Wilder Kaiser Trail, Gildensteig and Kleines Törl, duration: 3.5 hours
- Grutten Hut (1,620 m) over the Wilder Kaiser Trail and Jubiläumssteig, medium difficult, duration: 3 hours

== Ascents ==
- Maukspitze (2,231 m) in 2.5 hours
- Ackerlspitze (2,329 m) in 3 hours
- Regalmspitze (2,253 m) in 3 hours
