= Ellmauer Tor =

Saddle in the Kaiser Mountains in Tyrol, Austria

Coordinates: 47°33′59″N 12°19′13″E

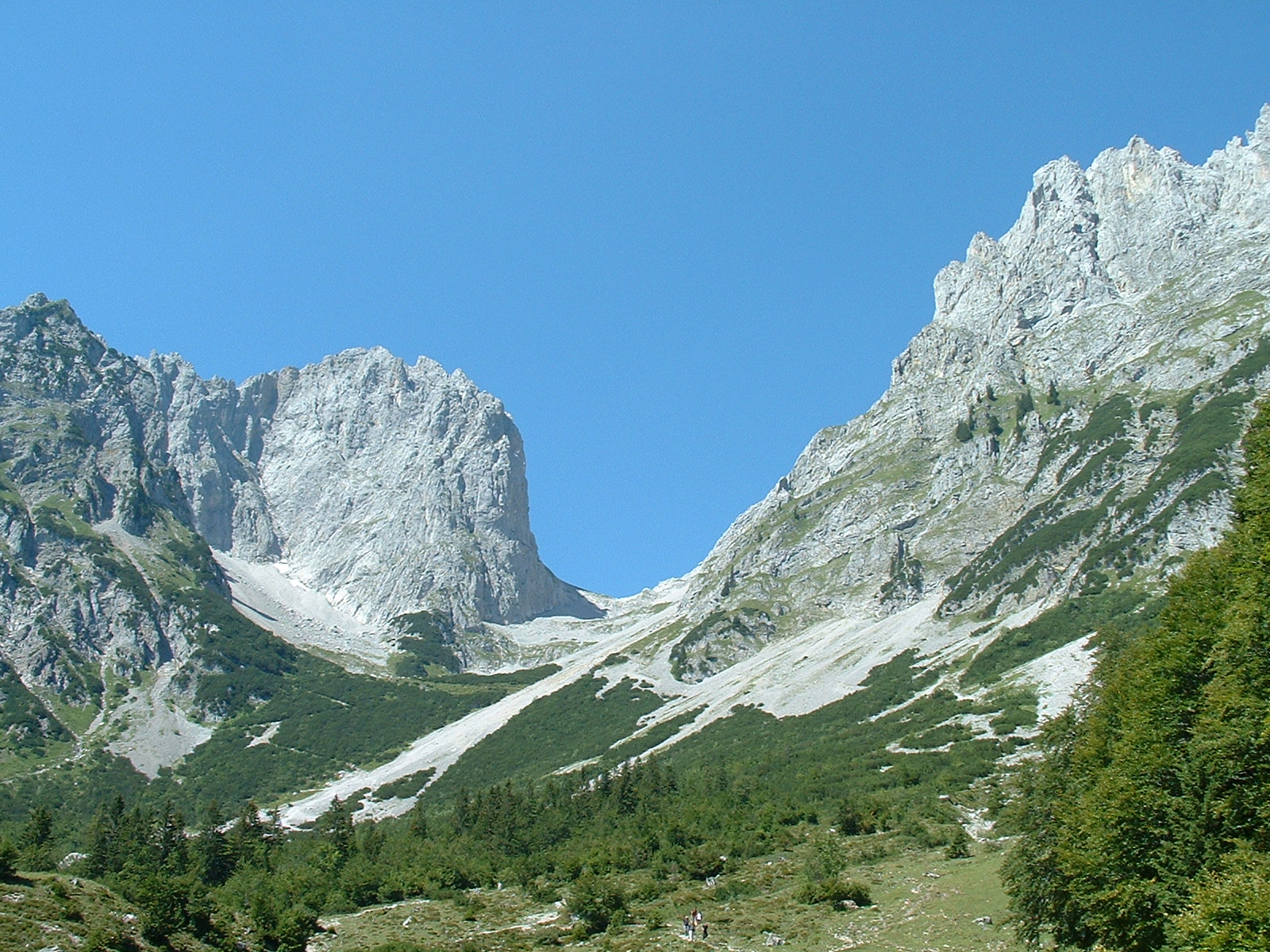
The Ellmauer Tor from the south

The Ellmauer Tor is a 2,000-metre high rock saddle in the middle of the Kaisergebirge in the Austrian state of Tyrol.

It is the deepest saddle on the main ridge of the Wilder Kaiser between the Ostkaiser's Ackerlspitze in the East Kaiser and the Ellmauer Halt in the Central Kaiser mountains. Because there is a well-used route across the Ellmauer Tor with its unique setting, it is often referred to as the "heart of the Kaiser". From the south, seen from the general direction of Ellmau or Going, it is the distinctive notch in the Kaisergebirge between the Karlspitzen and the Goinger Halt.

== Routes ==
The Ellmauer Tor is the most important and most frequently used crossing in the Wilder Kaiser. On clear summer's days countless climbers walk through here. The most famous way leads from the north, from the Stripsenjochhaus through the Steinerne Rinne to the Ellmauer Tor. For this route Alpine experience, secure footing and no fear of heights are indispensable, even though it is well safeguarded. No less popular is the way from the south, from the Wochenbrunner Alm either via the Gaudeamus Hut or via the Grutten Hut and the Jubiläumssteig to Ellmauer Tor. This route is easier, but very exposed to the sun. The Tor has an amazing panorama of the surrounding rock scenery and a view south to the High Tauern, the highest mountains in Austria. It is also the starting point for ascents of the Goinger Halt and Karlspitzen.

In winter, the climb through the Kübel cirque (Kübelkar) is one of the most popular ski tours in the region.
