= Regalmspitze =

Mountain in the Kaisergebirge in the Northern Limestone Alps in Austria

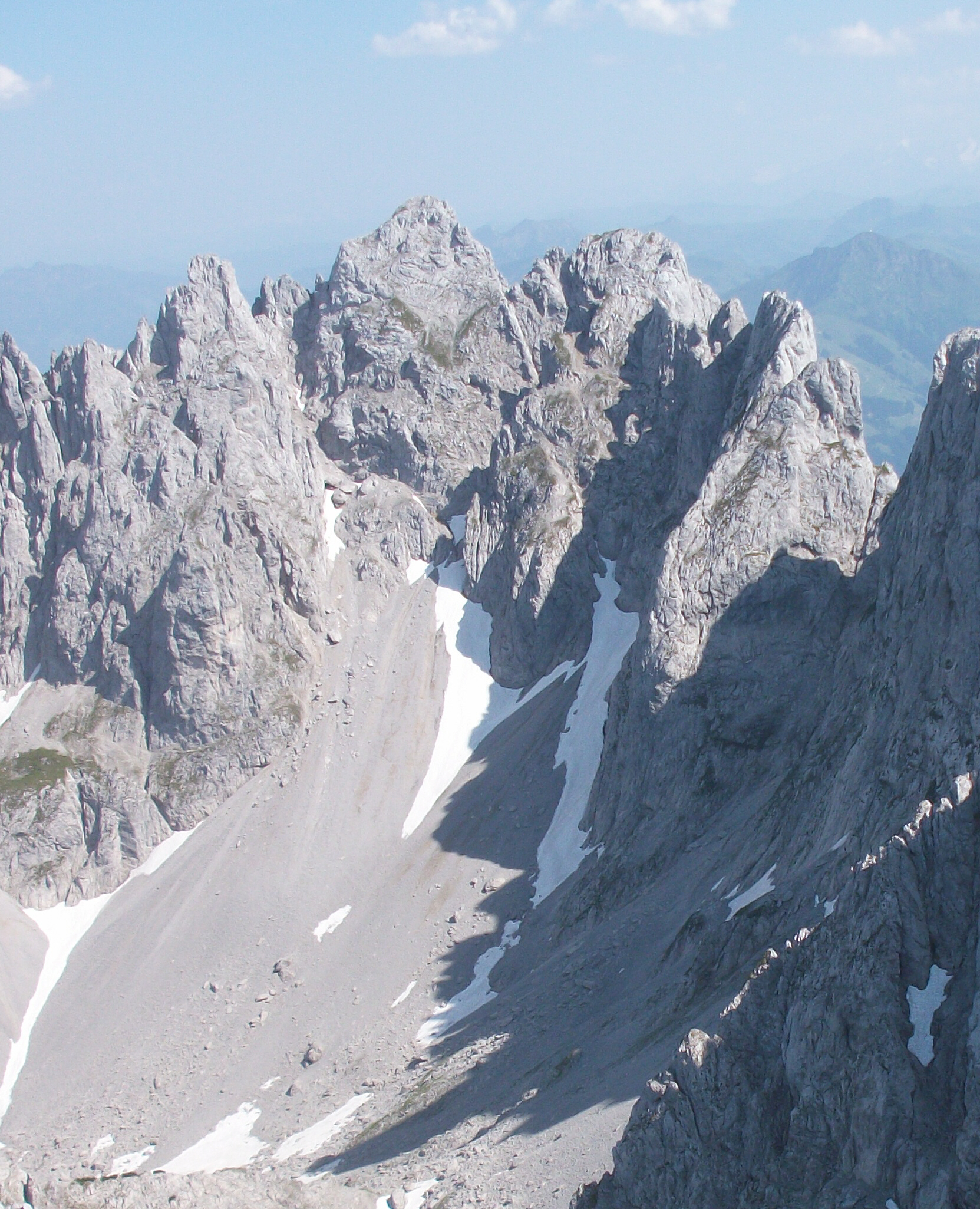
- Regalmturm, Regalmspitze (center), Regalmwand, Törlwand, Kleines Törl (from left to right), seen from the northwest from the Vorderen Goinger Halt.

Highest point
- Elevation: 2,253 m (AA) (7,392 ft)
- Coordinates: 47°33′24″N 12°20′20″E

Geography
- Location within Austria
- Location: Tyrol, Austria
- Parent range: Kaisergebirge

Climbing
- Normal route: Gaudeamus Hut – Wildererkanzel – Gildensteig – Regalmspitze

The Regalmspitze (or Regalpspitze) is a 2,253 metres (7,392 ft) high, lesser known mountain in the Kaisergebirge in the Northern Limestone Alps in Austria. The name Regalmwand (or Regalpwand), refers to the 2,227 metres (7,306 ft) high subpeak to the west of the Regalmspitze.

== Location ==
The Regalmspitze and its subpeak rise in the eastern part of the Kaisergebirge mountains, often referred to as the Ostkaiser or "East Kaiser". They lie somewhat east of the Kleines Törl and west of the high and better-known Ackerlspitze. Seen from the south, from the area of Going, the Ostkaiser forms a famous mountain backdrop which includes the Regalmspitze.

== Routes ==
- Approaches

Because of its challenging approach route the Regalmspitze is one of the unknown and rarely climbed peaks on the Wilder Kaiser ridge. The normal route should only be attempted by mountaineers with sure footing, no fear of heights and climbing agility. The approach is usually made from the south, i.e. from the Gaudeamus Hut or from the Ackerl Hut over the signposted Gildensteig climbing path, past the Wildererkanzel zigzagging up to the memorial tablet south of and below the Kleines Törl. Another option is an approach from the north, i.e. from the Griesner Alm in the Kaiserbach valley via the Fritz Pflaum Hut and the Kleines Törl to the memorial plaque.

- Normal route

Near the aforementioned memorial plaque, the signposted, but unsecured normal route branches off up to the Regalmspitze ab. It crosses steep slopes to a rocky gully, runs up the gully and then continues over very steep terrain and short steps to the wind gap between the Regalmwand and Regalmspitze. This is where the main challenge, the 5-metre-high (16 ft) vertical wall of the Wandl has to be overcome (UIAA climbing grade II). Once over that, the route continues without any difficulty over easy rocks up to the summit cross on the Regalmspitze.
