= Couloir =

Steep, narrow mountain gully

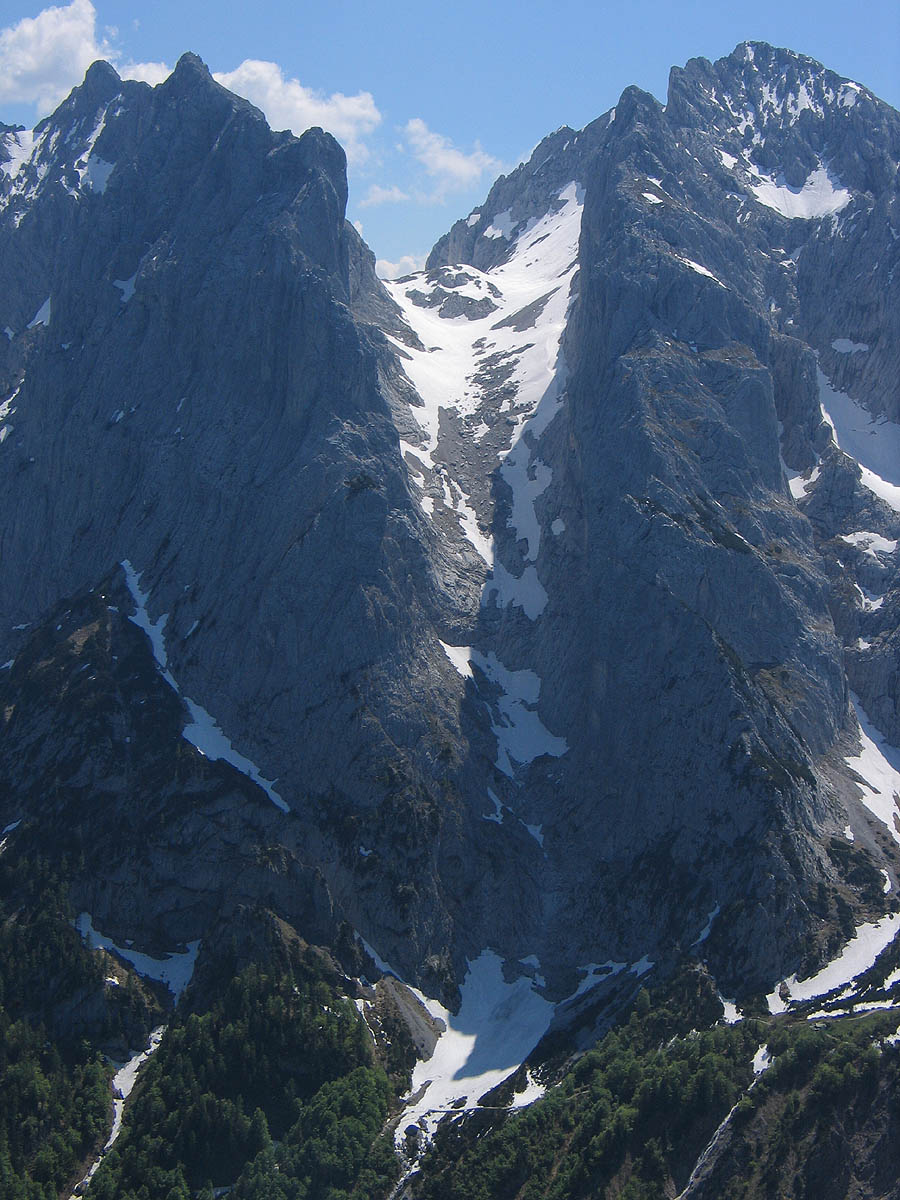
The Steinerne Rinne couloir from the north with the peaks of Predigtstuhl (l) and Fleischbank (r) in the Austrian Kaiser Mountains

A couloir (French: [ku.lwaʁ], "passage" or "corridor") is a narrow gully with a steep gradient in mountainous terrain.

== Geology ==
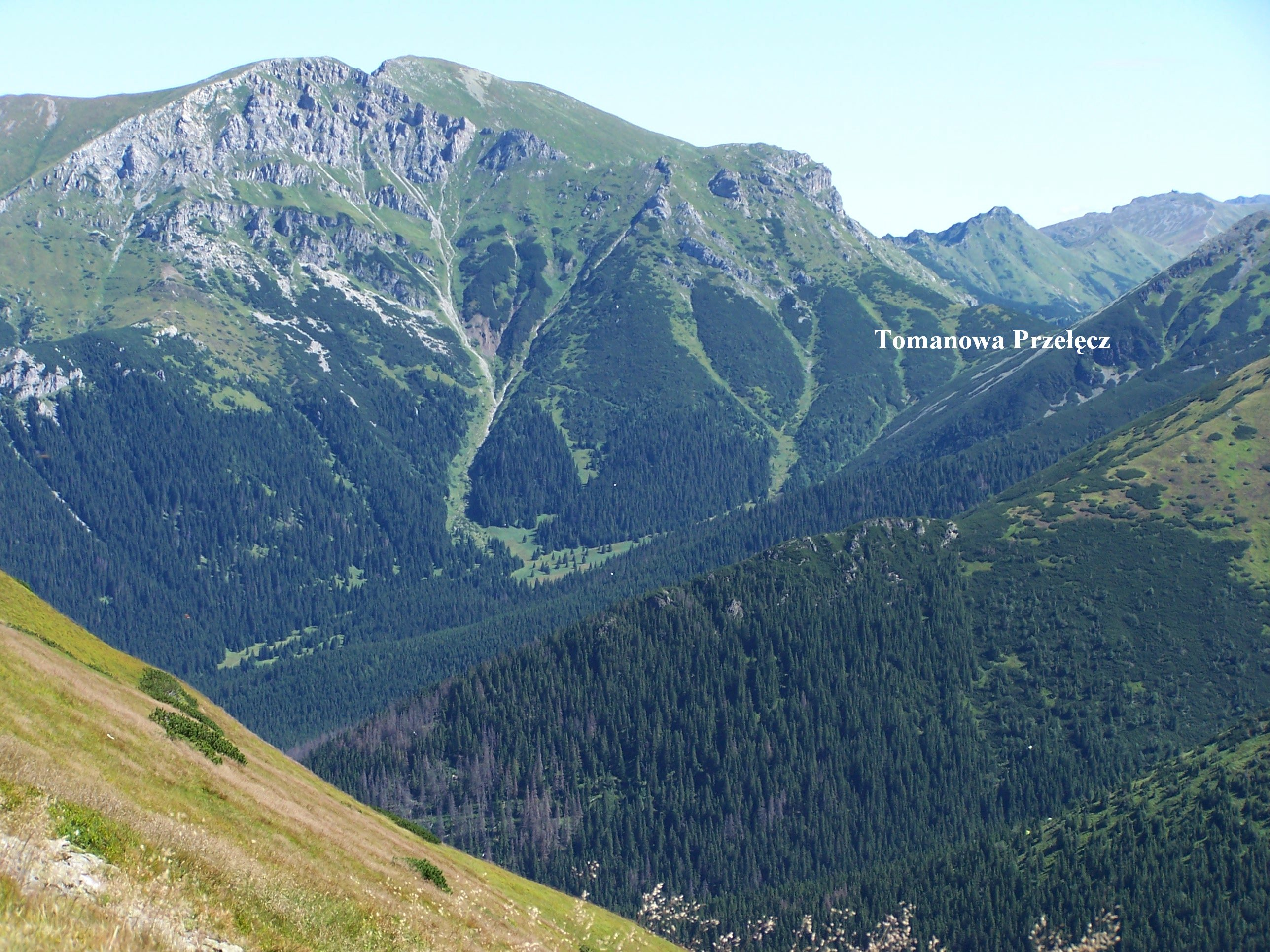
"Red Couloir" in the Polish Tatra Mountains

A couloir may be a seam, scar, or fissure, or vertical crevasse in an otherwise solid mountain mass. Though often hemmed in by sheer cliff walls, couloirs may also be less well-defined, and may often simply be a line of broken talus or scree ascending the mountainside and bordered by trees, rocks or other natural features. Couloirs are especially significant in winter months when they may be filled with snow or ice, and become much more noticeable than in warmer months when most of the snow and ice may recede. These physical features make the use of couloirs popular for both mountaineering and extreme skiing.
