= Kleines Törl =

Coordinates: 47°33′26″N 12°20′02″E

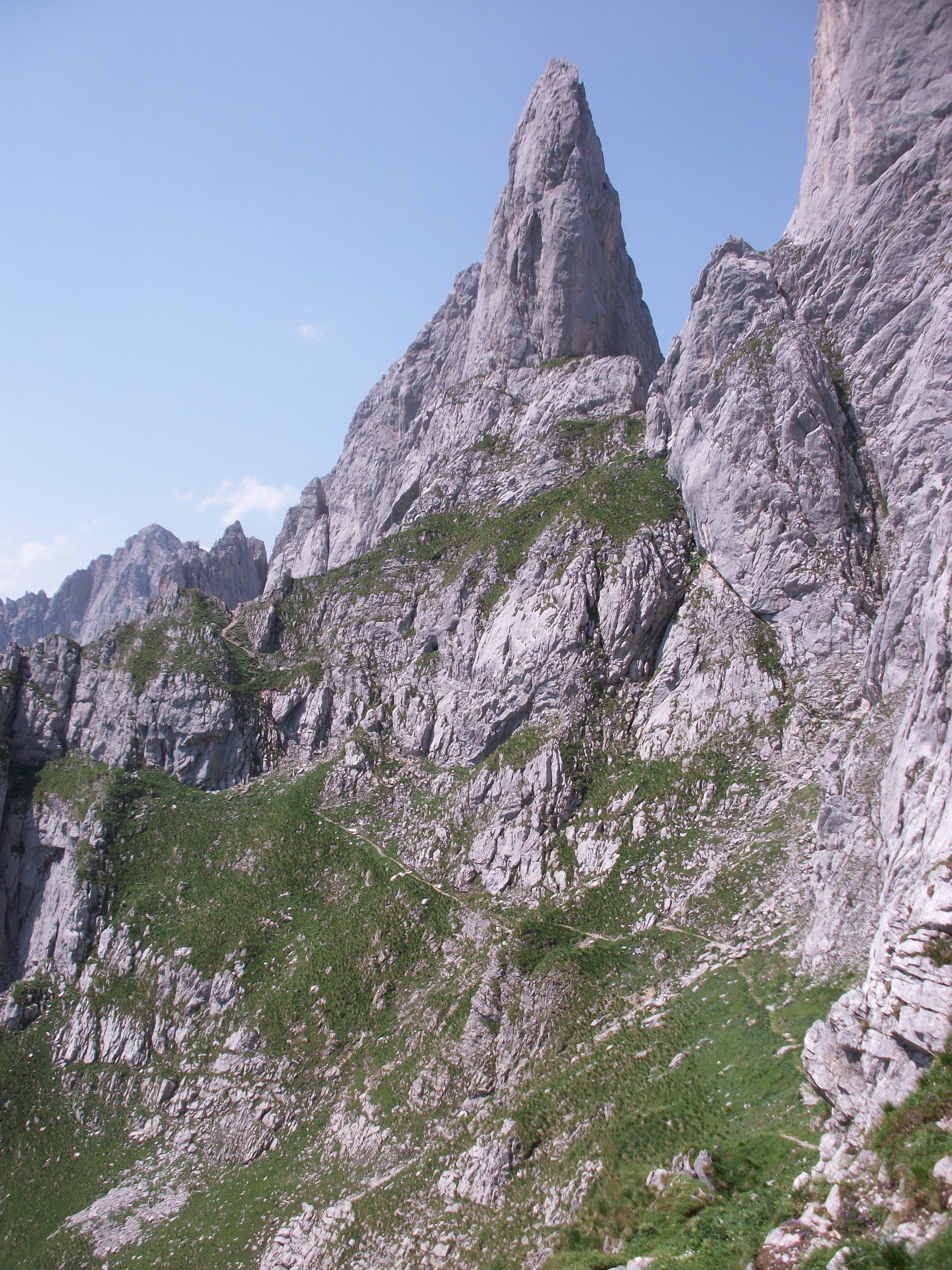
View of the Kleine Törl with Gildensteig (south side)

The Kleines Törl ("little gate") is a wind gap at an altitude of 2,102 metres (6,896 ft) in the eastern part of the Kaisergebirge mountain range in the Austrian federal state of Tyrol.

Viewed from the village of Going to the south, it can be clearly distinguished as a notch in the prominent main crest of the Wilder Kaiser. A signposted and heavily frequented climbing trail runs from the Fritz Pflaum Hut into the Griesner Cirque (Griesner Kar) to the north, through the Kleines Törl on the southern side, where the path is known as the Gildensteig, and on down to the Gaudeamus Hut or Ackerl Hut. This route is, however, largely exposed and requires sure-footedness, no fear of heights, and Alpine experience. Several minutes south of the Törl a second, signposted, but not secured, path through the rocks branches off to the 2,253 metres (7,392 ft) high Regalmspitze, which is classed at UIAA climbing grade II. The Kleines Törl is a popular destination in spring for ski tours from the Kaiserbach valley.
