= Predigtstuhl (Kaiser) =

Mountain in Austria

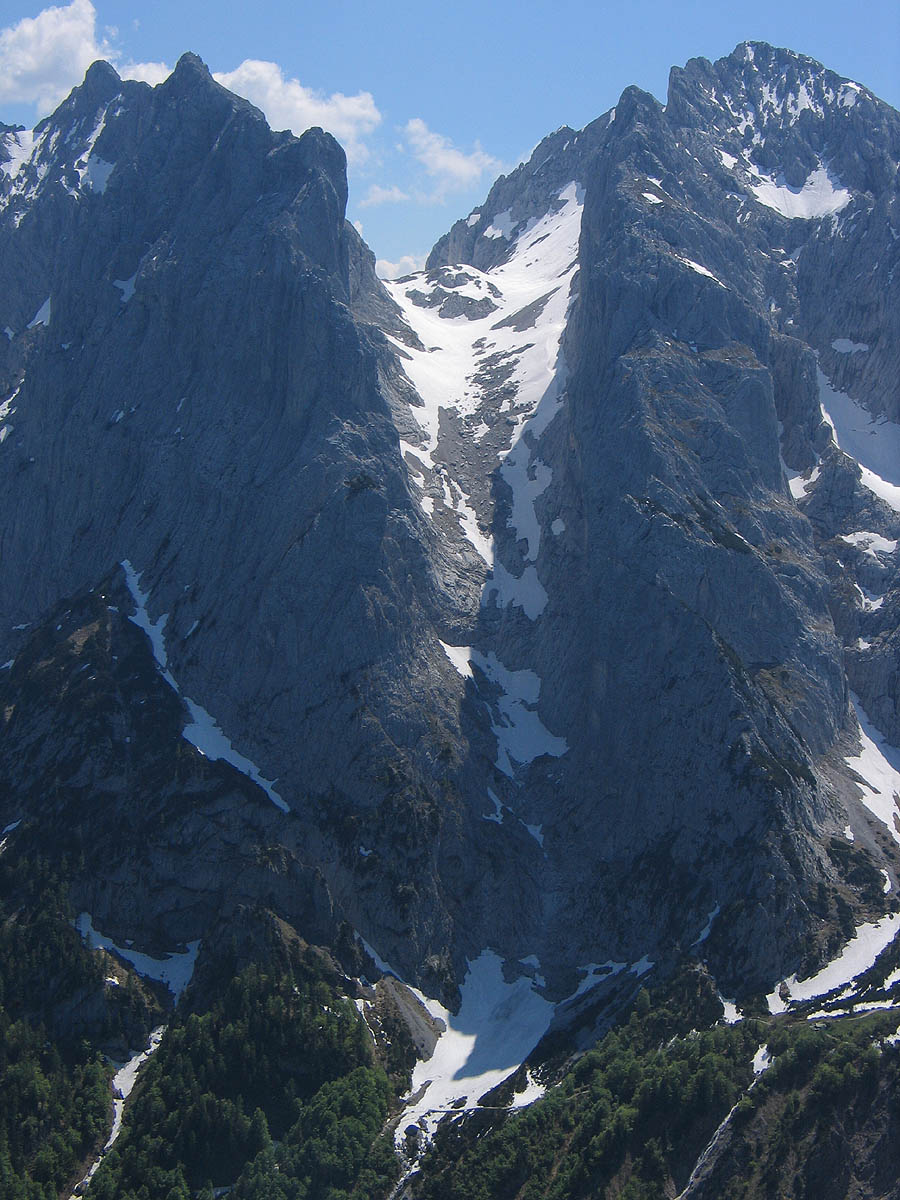
- The Steinerne Rinne couloir from the north. Left: (orographically right) the Predigtstuhl. Right: (orographically left) the Fleischbank

Highest point
- Elevation: 2,116 m (AA) (6,942 ft)
- Coordinates: 47°34′15″N 12°19′19″E

Geography
- Location within Austria
- Location: Tyrol, Austria
- Parent range: Kaiser Mountains

Climbing
- First ascent: 1895 by Karl Botzong
- Normal route: Angermannrinne main peak (UIAA grade III)

The Predigtstuhl is a 2,116-metre (6,942 ft) high mountain in the Wilder Kaiser range in the Northern Limestone Alps in Austria, east of Kufstein in the Tyrol.

The mountain is one of the well-known climbing mountains in the Northern Limestone Alps. Among its most famous climbing routes are the Angermann Gully (Angermannrinne) (normal route at UIAA grade III via the Predigtstuhl wind gap), the striking North Rim (Nordkante) and the Botzong Chimney (Botzong-Kamin). The start point for these routes is the Stripsenjochhaus mountain hut belonging to the Austrian Alpine Club (ÖAV).

Together with the Hinterer Goinger Halt, Karlspitzen, Fleischbank and Christaturm the peak forms the rim of the Steinerne Rinne, a huge couloir and old glacial cirque, that runs southwards up to the crossing of the Ellmauer Tor.
