= Ackerlspitze =

Peak in the Kaisergebirge range in the east of the Austrian state of Tyrol

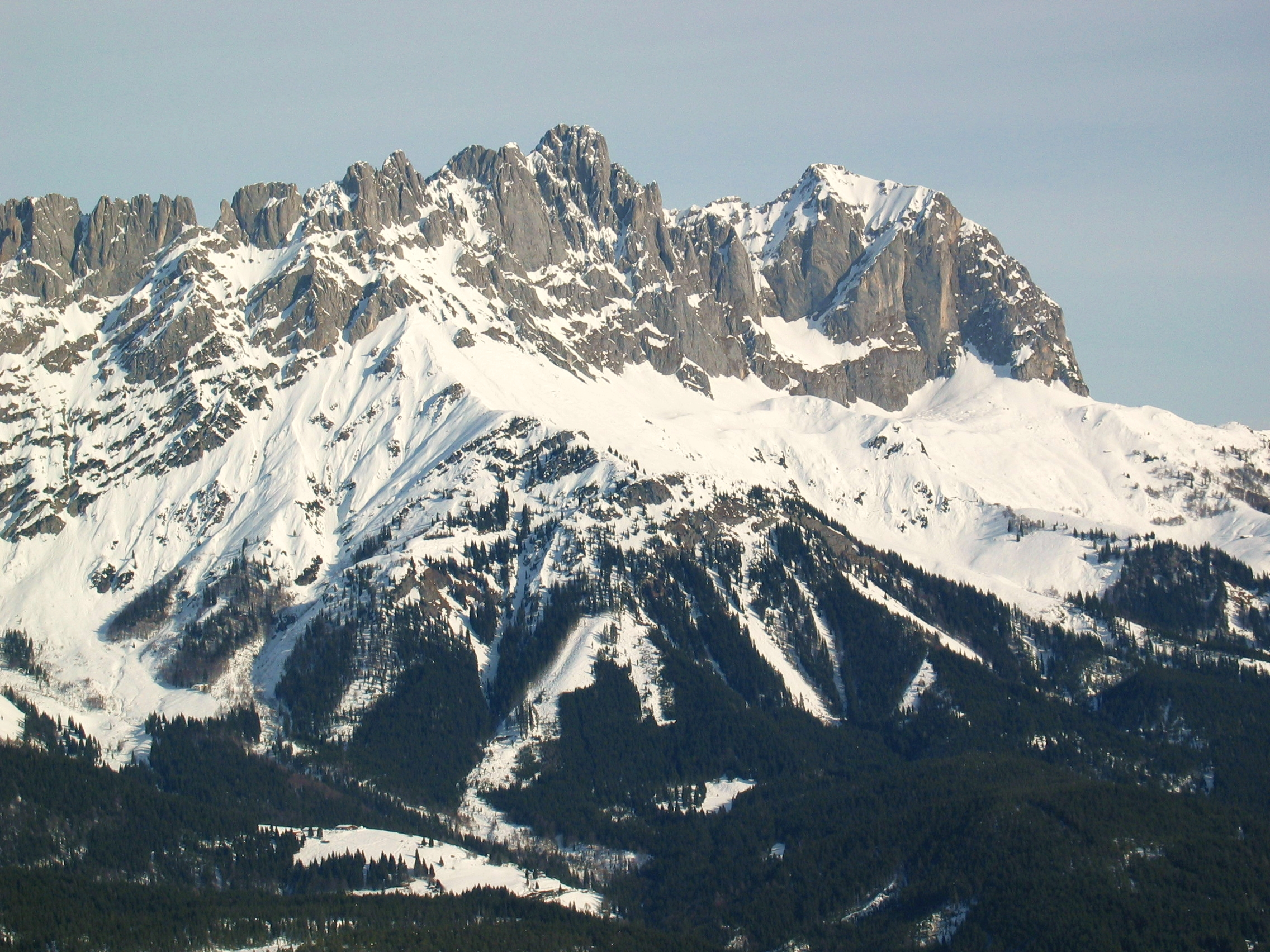
- Ackerlspitze (centre) and Maukspitze (right), seen from Hartkaiser (southwest)

Highest point
- Elevation: 2,329 m (AA) (7,641 ft)
- Prominence: 319
- Coordinates: 47°N 12°E

Geography
- Location within Austria
- Location: Tyrol, Austria
- Parent range: Kaiser Mountains

Climbing
- Normal route: From Fritz Pflaum Hut towards Kleines Törl southeast to the summit (Grade I)

At 2,329 metres above sea level, the Ackerlspitze is the second highest peak in the Kaisergebirge range in the east of the Austrian state of Tyrol. The mountain is located in the eastern part of the range, also referred to as the Ostkaiser or East Kaiser. To the east it is flanked by the Maukspitze (2.231 m), to the north it sends a ridge to the Lärcheck (2,123 m). To the southwest a prominent, rocky arête runs over to the Regalmspitze (2,253 m) and on to the Kleines Törl. To the south the Ackerlspitze drops steeply, with vertical rock faces in places, into the Leukental valley. To the northwest it falls away just as steeply into the Griesner Cirque (Griesner Kar) and to the northeast into the Mauk Cirque (Maukkar). On fine days there is an attractive and extensive panoramic view from the summit of the Ackerlspitze over the neighbouring mountain groups and as far as the Chiemsee lake in Bavaria as well as the Großvenediger.

== First climbed ==
The first touristic ascent was achieved on 1 October 1826 by Karl Thurwieser and J. Carl, led by Stephan Unterrainer.

== Bases and tours ==
- From the south

The base for the classic ascent of the Ackerlspitze is the Ackerl Hut (self-catering) at 1,460 metres. From here a narrow and very exposed path strikes north to the Niedersessel Cirque (Niedersesselkar) (there is often a steep and dangerous old icefield here until mid-July). From there the route leads up a 25-metre-rockface, partly equipped with iron rungs, through the Hochsessel and continues along the east-facing scarp to reach the summit in 3 hours total. According to the literature it is an easy grade I, but exposed tour with a risk of falling rocks, requiring dry conditions, sure footing, no fear of heights and Alpine experience. The valley base for this route is Going.

- From the north

A less frequented route, which is well worthwhile and less demanding than that from the south. The start point is the Griesner Alm in the Kaiserbach valley, from there the path snakes upwards to reach the Fritz Pflaum Hut (1,865 m, self-catering). From there it is another 2 hours to the top along the shaded northern flank of the Ackerlspitze. This route is rather easier, not so exposed and endangered by falling rocks compared with the southern option, but not usually usable until July due to fields of old snow.

- Maukspitze crossing

Those who have summited Ackerlspitze mostly traverse to the neighbouring Maukspitze which represents an easier descent than the 20-metre-wall and gully from Niedersessel Cirque. From the Hochsattel Ridge there is a signposted, but rather exposed route with no safety facilities and significant gradient. Getting down from the Maukspitze, it is most practical to take the relatively straightforward southwest-facing ramp to the Niedersessel and back to the Ackerl Hut.

== Gallery ==
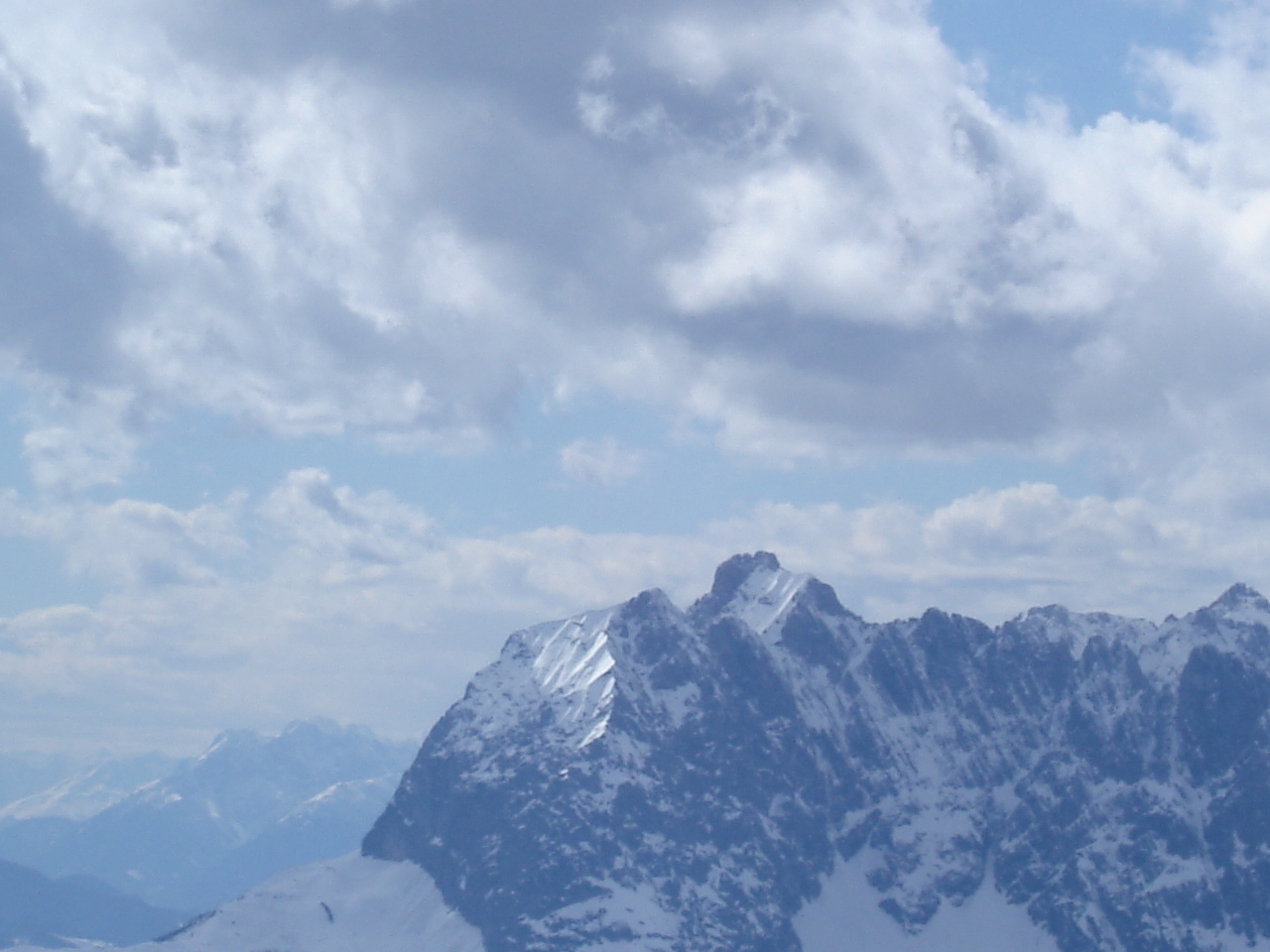
(from left to right) Maukspitze, Ackerlspitze, Lärcheck

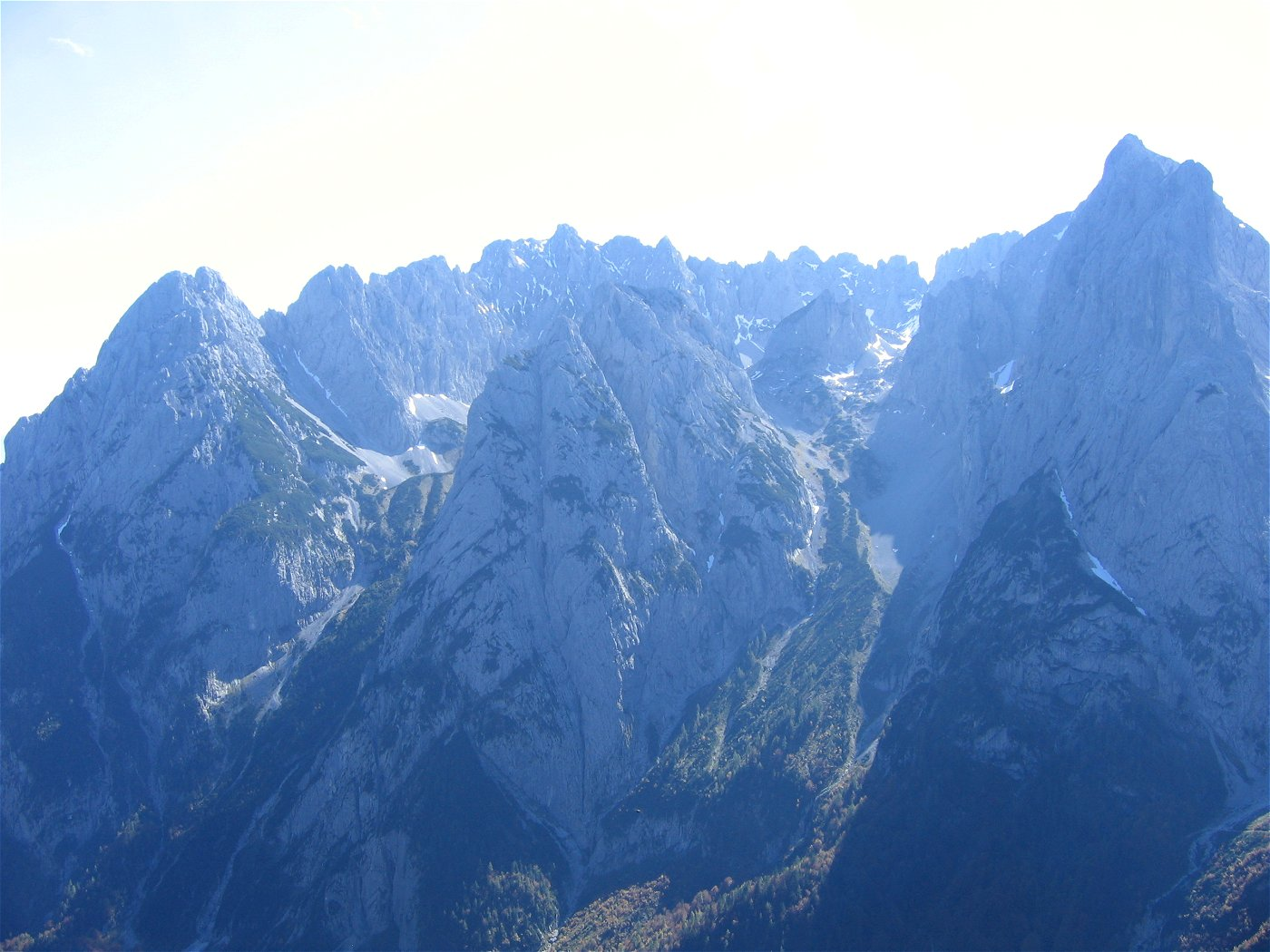
Lärcheck (left), Mitterkaiser (front), Ackerlspitze (behind), Predigtstuhl (right)

== Sources and maps ==
- Horst Höfler, Jan Piepenstock: Alpenvereinsführer Kaisergebirge alpin, Munich 2006, ISBN 3-7633-1257-9
- Alpenvereinskarte 1:25.000, Kaisergebirge, Sheet 8
