= Fleischbank (Kaiser) =

Mountain in the Tyrol in Austria

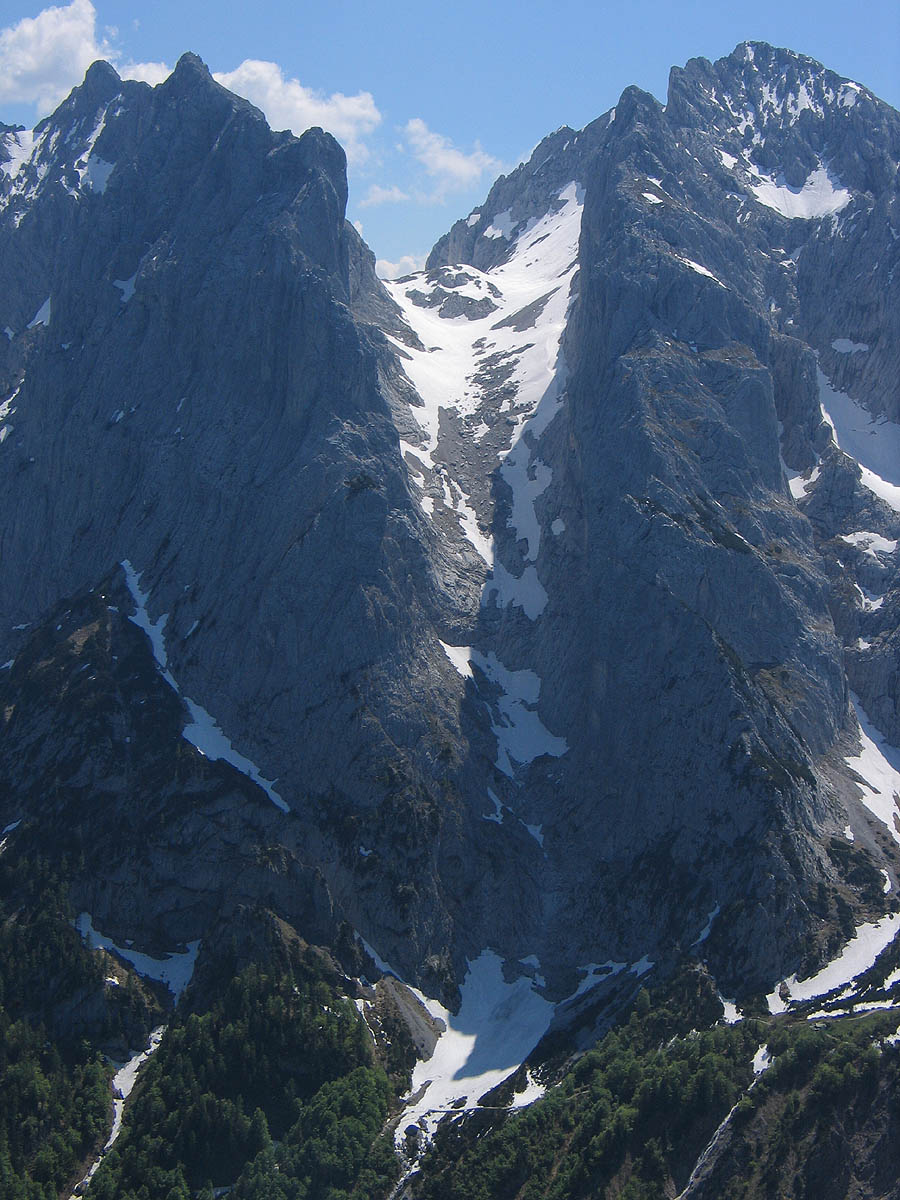
- The Steinerne Rinne couloir from the north. Left: (orographically right) the Predigtstuhl. Right: (orographically left) the Fleischbank

Highest point
- Elevation: 2,187 m (AA) (7,175 ft)
- Coordinates: 47°34′09″N 12°19′03″E

Geography
- Location within Austria
- Location: Tyrol, Austria
- Parent range: Kaiser Mountains

Climbing
- First ascent: 1886 Ch. Schöllhorn, Th. Widauer
- Normal route: Herrweg and Schöllhornrinne, UIAA III

The Fleischbank is a 2,187-metre-high mountain in the Wilder Kaiser range in the Northern Limestone Alps in Austria, east of Kufstein in the Tyrol.

The mountain is one of the well-known climbs in the Northern Limestone Alps. The starting point for many easy to difficult climbing tours is the Stripsenjochhaus belonging to the ÖAV.
