= Maukspitze =

Mountain peak in the Kaisergebirge range of the Northern Limestone Alps

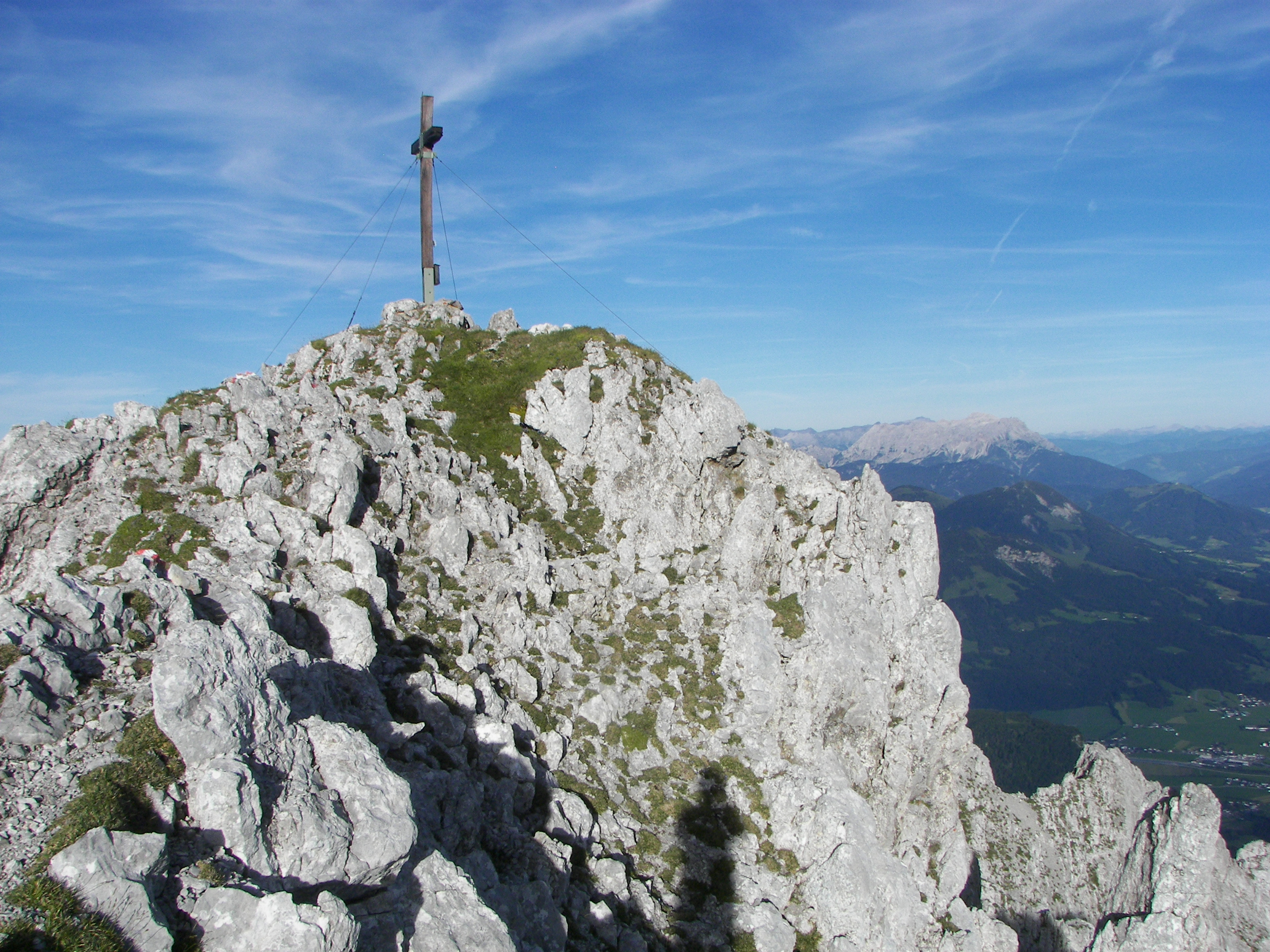
- Summit of the Maukspitze

Highest point
- Elevation: 2,231 m (AA) (7,320 ft)
- Coordinates: 47°33′34″N 12°21′25″E

Geography
- Location within Austria
- Location: Tyrol, Austria
- Parent range: Kaisergebirge

The Maukspitze is a mountain peak in the Kaisergebirge range of the Northern Limestone Alps. It is 2,231 meters above the Adriatic, making it the ninth tallest peak in the Kaisergebirge.

== Location ==
The Maukspitze is the easternmost independent summit of the Kaisergebirge mountains. To the east is the crest of the Niederkaiser, to the west the Maukspitze borders on the Ackerlspitze. To the south, the Maukspitze falls steeply and abruptly (Niedersessel, Hochsessel), in places with vertical rock faces, into the Leukental towards St. Johann in Tirol. To the north the Maukspitze drops equally sharply into the Kaiserbach valley.

== Routes ==
The Maukspitze is a popular viewing point due to its exposed situation, but is not easy to reach from any side. The simplest climb runs from the Wochenbrunneralm in the south via Niedersessel and Südostgrat (I). The Maukspitze is also accessible via a marked but exposed path from the Ackerlspitze. Both of these climbs start from the Ackerl Hut. There are many climbing routes of various grades.

== Photos ==
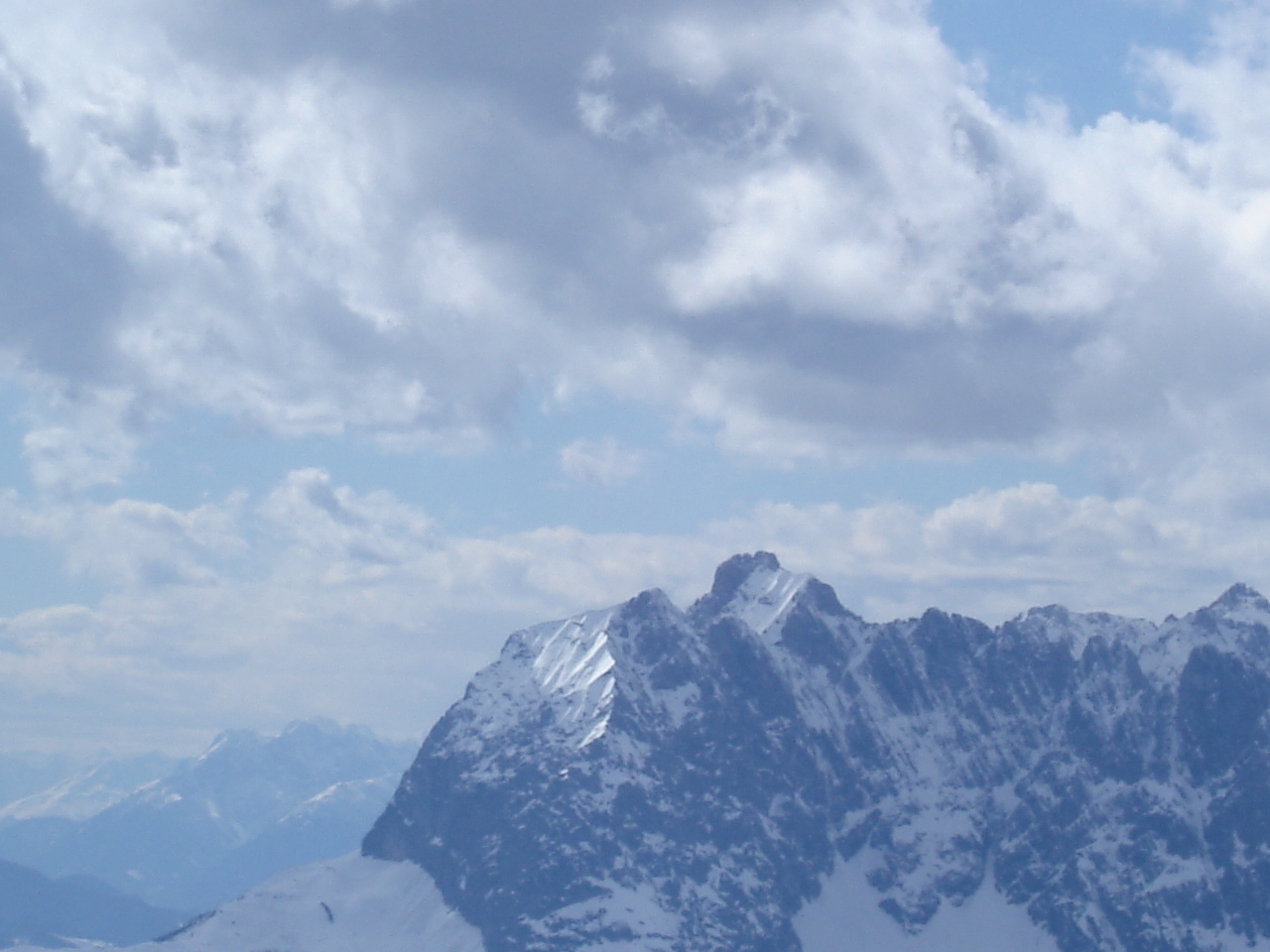
The Maukspitze (left), and Ackerlspitze (centre),
seen from the Waidringer Steinplatte in winter

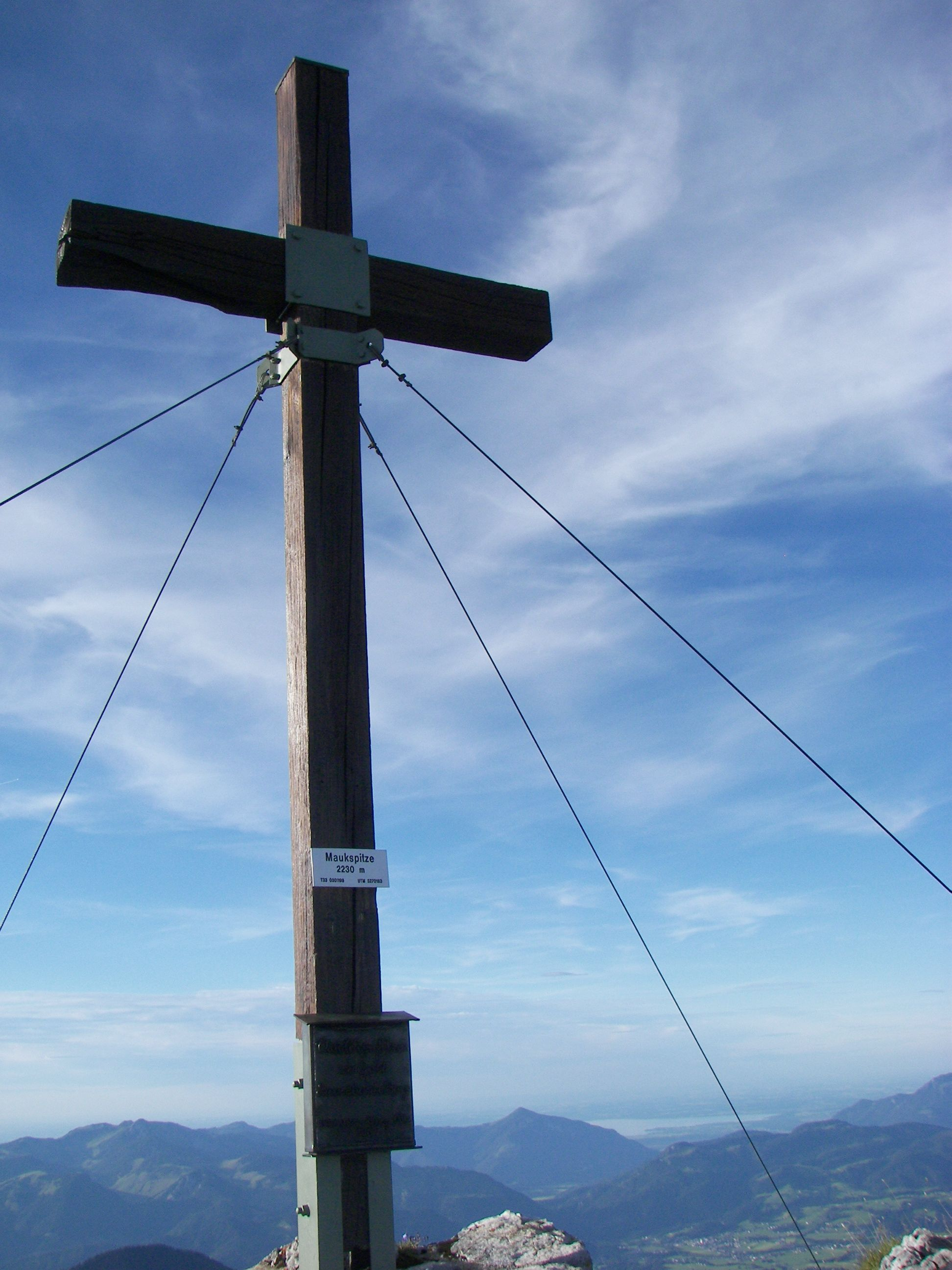
Summit cross on the Maukspitze

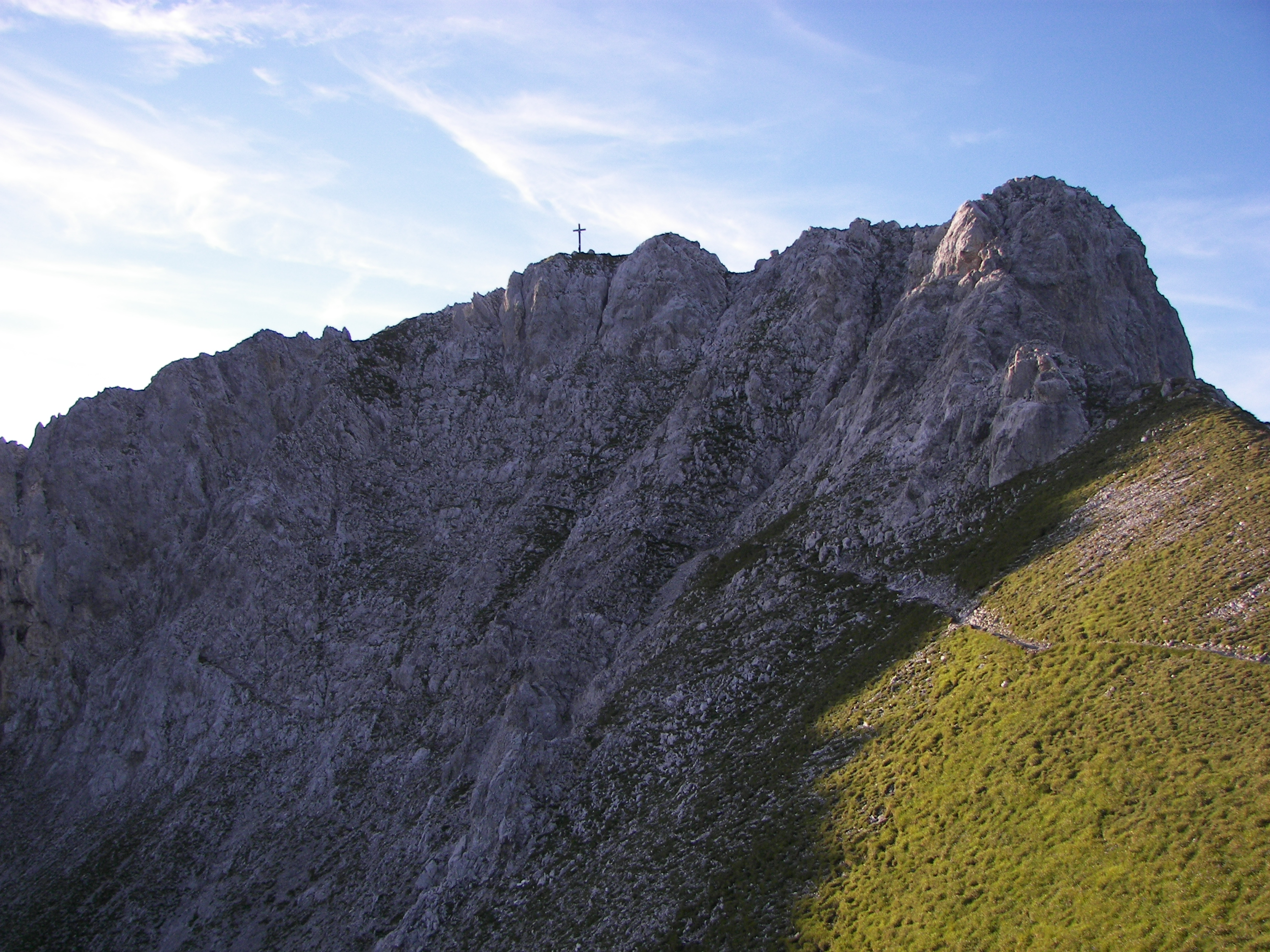
View of the summit from the south

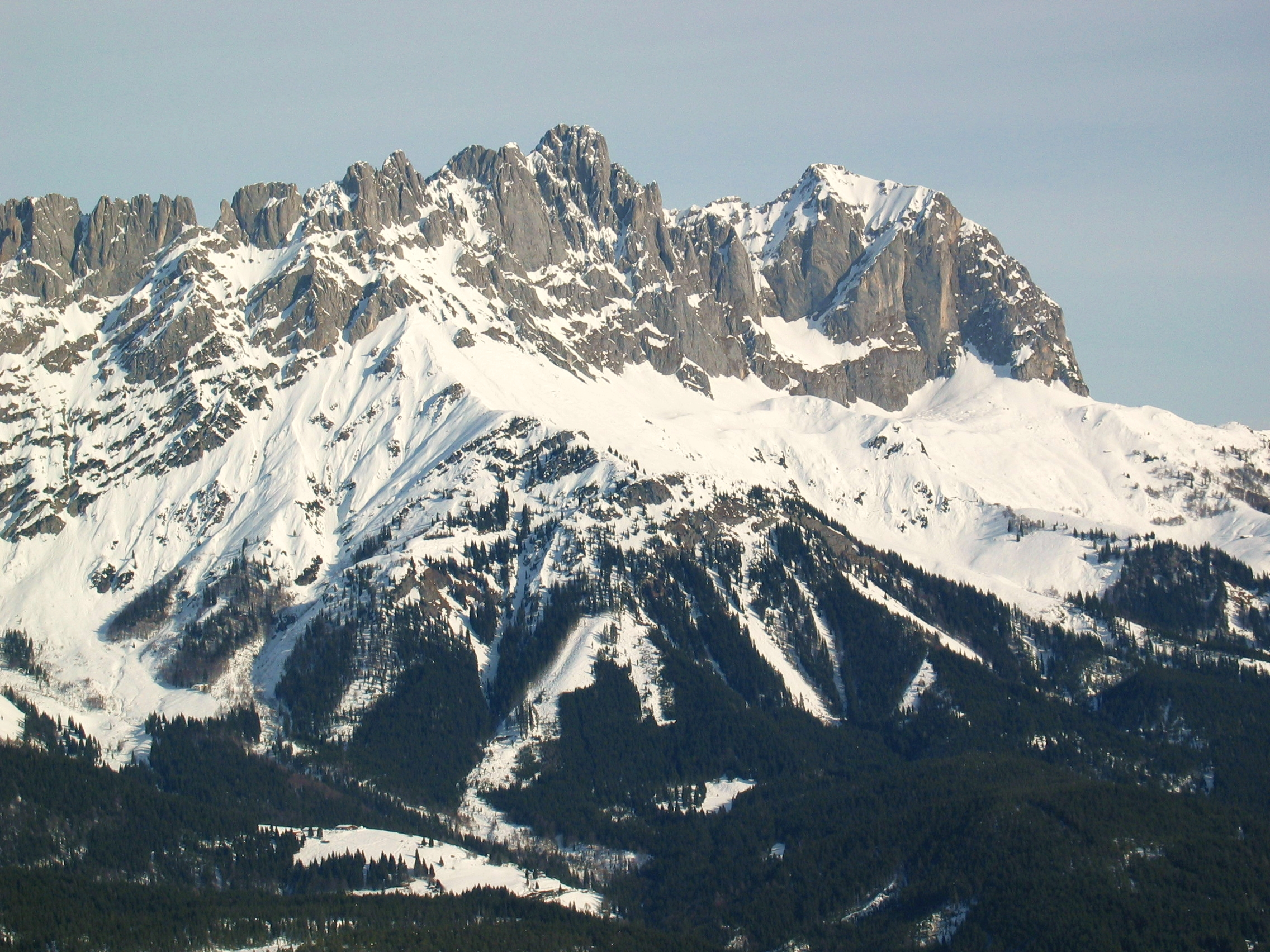
Maukspitze (right) and Ackerlspitze (centre), seen from Hartkaiser (southwest)
