= Kaindl Hut =

Privately run mountain hut in the Austrian state of Tyrol

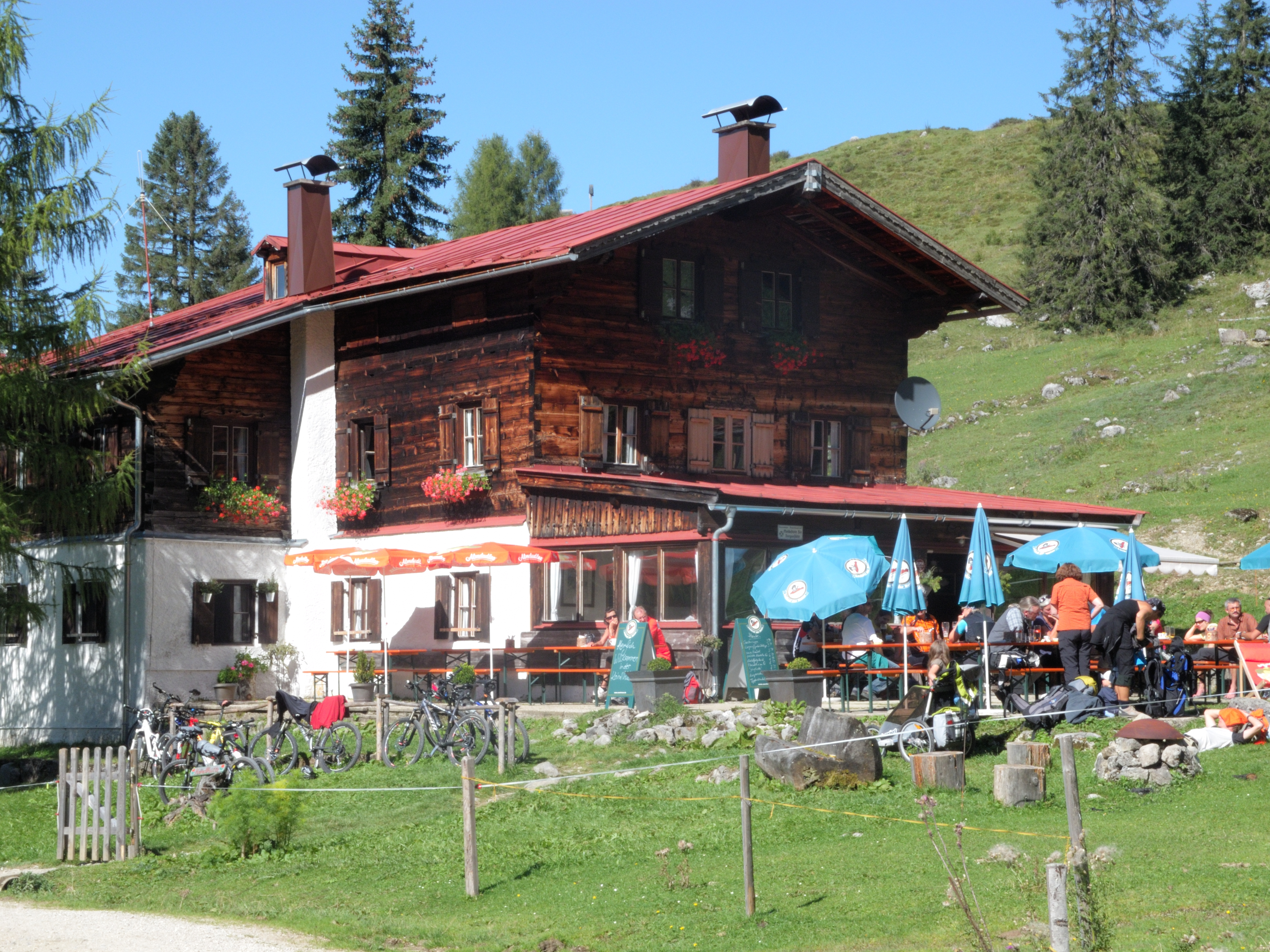
- The Kaindl Hut in the Kaiser Mountains of the Tyrol
- Interactive map of the Kaindl Hut area

General information
- Coordinates: 47°33′58″N 12°13′54″E
- Elevation: 1,318 m (4,324 ft)
- Owner: Michael Gruber

Website
- www.kaindlhuette.com

The Kaindl Hut (German: Kaindlhütte) is a privately run mountain hut at a height of 1,293 metres (4,242 ft) in the Kaiser mountains in the Austrian state of Tyrol.

== Location ==
The Kaindl Hut lies in the western part of the Kaiser on an Alpine meadow, the Steinbergalm, and at the foot of the Zettenkaiser, Scheffauer and Hackenköpfe mountains. North of the Kaindl Hut is the rather unimpressive Gamskogel (1,448 m) and the wooded ridge of the Brentenjoch. The hut is located in the Wilder Kaiser nature reserve.

== Access ==
- by car on the A12 (Austria) and A93 (Germany) motorway to the Kufstein Nord exit and then to the valley station of the Kaiser Lift, or to Kufstein Mitterndorf to the car park on the edge of the wood.
- by rail to Kufstein railway station and then on foot to the start of the trail in Kienbichl.

== Approaches ==
There are several possible approaches to the Kaindl Hut:

- from the valley station of the chair lift in Kufstein via the Brentenjoch in 2.5 hours.
- from the "Aschenbrenner" mountain inn in 1.5 hours, also possible by bicycle.
- from the Hintersteiner See near Scheffau via the Walleralm in 2.5 hours.
- from Kufstein-Sparchen (Josef Madersperger monument) via the Duxeralm and Gamskogel in 3 hours.

The chair lift to Brentenjoch, from where the hut is reached in 40 minutes with little elevation gain, was closed in 2012 but re-opened in May 2015. The journey takes about 20 minutes and takes passengers to a height of 1,200 m.

== Crossings ==
- Anton Karg Haus or Hans Berger Haus in the Kaisertal via the Bettlersteig trail, medium difficulty, duration: 2.5 hours.
- Grutten Hut via the Hochegg, Walleralm and Wilder Kaiser Trail, easy, duration: 5 hours.

== Tour options ==
North of the hut is a gently sloping basin surrounded by rounded, grass-covered mountains known as the Grasberge. Routes in this area lead to the Brentenjoch, Gamskogel and Brandkogel and can be combined into a full-day circular walk. To the south are the rock faces of the Wilder Kaiser.

- Scheffauer (2,111 m) along the Widauersteig trail in 2.5 hours (UIAA climbing grade I).
- Zettenkaiser (1,968 m) via the Kleinen Friedhof and the normal route in 2 hours (UIAA II).
- Hackenköpfe (2,126 m) and Sonneck via the Widauersteig and Scheffauer, difficult ridge crossing.
- various Alpine climbing routes (some for sport-climbers) on the north faces of the Scheffauer and Zettenkaiser.
- Climbing garden near the hut.
