= Sonneck =

Mountain in the Kaisergebirge range of the Northern Limestone Alps in Austria

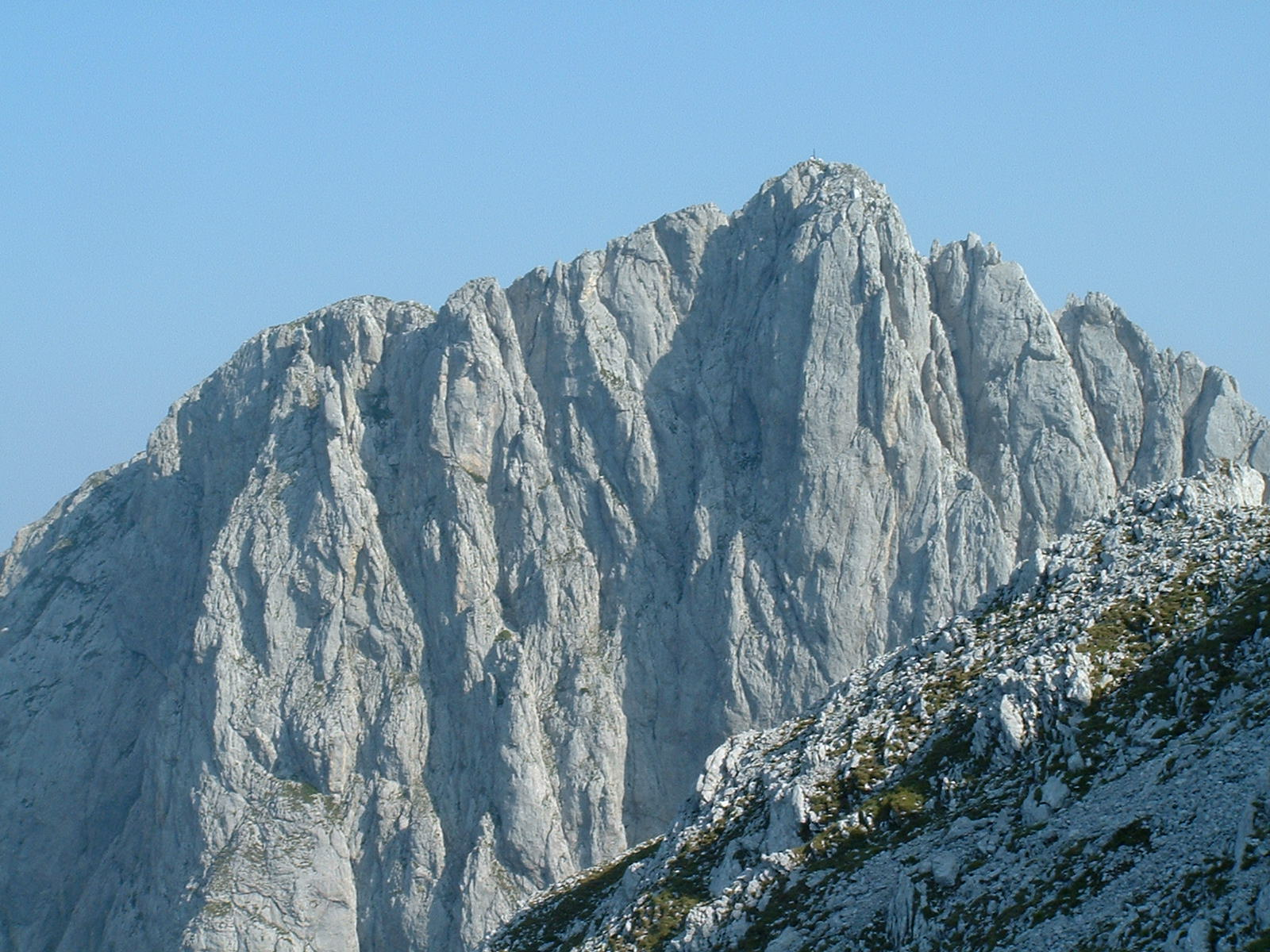
- Sonneck from the south

Highest point
- Elevation: 2,260 m (AA) (7,410 ft)
- Coordinates: 47°33′43″N 12°17′00″E

Geography
- Location within Austria
- Location: Tyrol, Austria
- Parent range: Kaisergebirge

Climbing
- Normal route: Scheffau – Kaiserhochalm – Kopfkraxen – Sonneck

The Sonneck is a 2,260-metre-high (7,410 ft) mountain in the Kaisergebirge range of the Northern Limestone Alps in Austria. On its broad peak stands a solid summit cross, the panorama is comprehensive and there are particularly good views of the Ellmauer Halt, the highest mountain in the range, the Treffauer and Lake Hinterstein.

== Location ==
The Sonneck rises in the western part of the Wilder Kaiser on the main crest between the Hackenköpfe and Kopfkraxen in the west and Ellmauer Halt and Treffauer further east. It is one of the higher Kaiser peaks, but is rarely climbed.

== Routes ==
The Sonneck is one of the easiest, but also rather unknown summits in the Kaisergebirge. It may be tackled by experienced and fit mountaineers either from the south or the north on two different routes.

- South route: 4 hours to ascend, 3 hours to descend, 1,350 metre height difference

The start point for this route is Scheffau am Wilden Kaiser. Cars may taken as far as the Gasthaus Jägerwirt (910 m). Thereafter the route continues on foot, initially quite gently through woods and meadows reaching the Kaiser Hochalm meadow after just under 2 hours. After that it becomes steeper, running past the southern side of the Sonnenstein, then across slopes of mountain pine and open schrofen terrain, a demanding section up to the Kopfkraxen, a lower peak. On sunny, warm days it is essential to set off early otherwise the ascent will be tortuous. From the Kopfkraxen the route becomes more challenging along the airy, but secured ridge with a short climb up to the summit of the Sonneck. The last section requires sure-footedness and a head for heights.

- North route: 6 hour to ascend, 4½ hours to descend, 1,750 metre height difference

The base for this route is Sparchen, a suburb of Kufstein. Initially this route involves a long approach march, but it is very scenic nevertheless. The trail runs through the Kaisertal valley past the Pfandlhof farm and St. Anthony's Chapel (Antoniuskapelle) and reaches the Anton Karg Haus in Hinterbärenbad after 2½ hours. It is possible to stay overnight here. The marked, but rarely used route now follows the "Beggar's Trail" (Bettlersteig)for half an hour towards the Kaindl Hut, until the route to the Sonneck branches off. The trail climbs a continuously steep slope, which is none too exciting, high into the "Chamois Cirque" (Gamskar, which is aptly named) and runs along the Gamskarköpferl finally crossing a scree cirque painstakingly to reach the summit of the Sonneck.

- Ridge crossing

It is possible to follow the entire ridge from the Sonneck over the Kopfkraxen, Wiesberg and Hackenköpfe to the Scheffauer. This route is, however, energy-sapping, lengthy, unmarked and unsecured and, in places, very exposed and laced with quite a few ascents. It may only be tackled by surefooted mountaineers with a head for heights and local knowledges and Alpine experience. The whole crossing from the Sonneck to the Scheffauer takes about 3 hours; and must be followed by a descent to the Kaindl Hut or to Lake Hinterstein. This ridge crossing may also be done in the opposite direction, but its length and difficulty is frequently underestimated.
