= Hackenköpfe =

Row of peaks in the western Kaisergebirge range in Austria

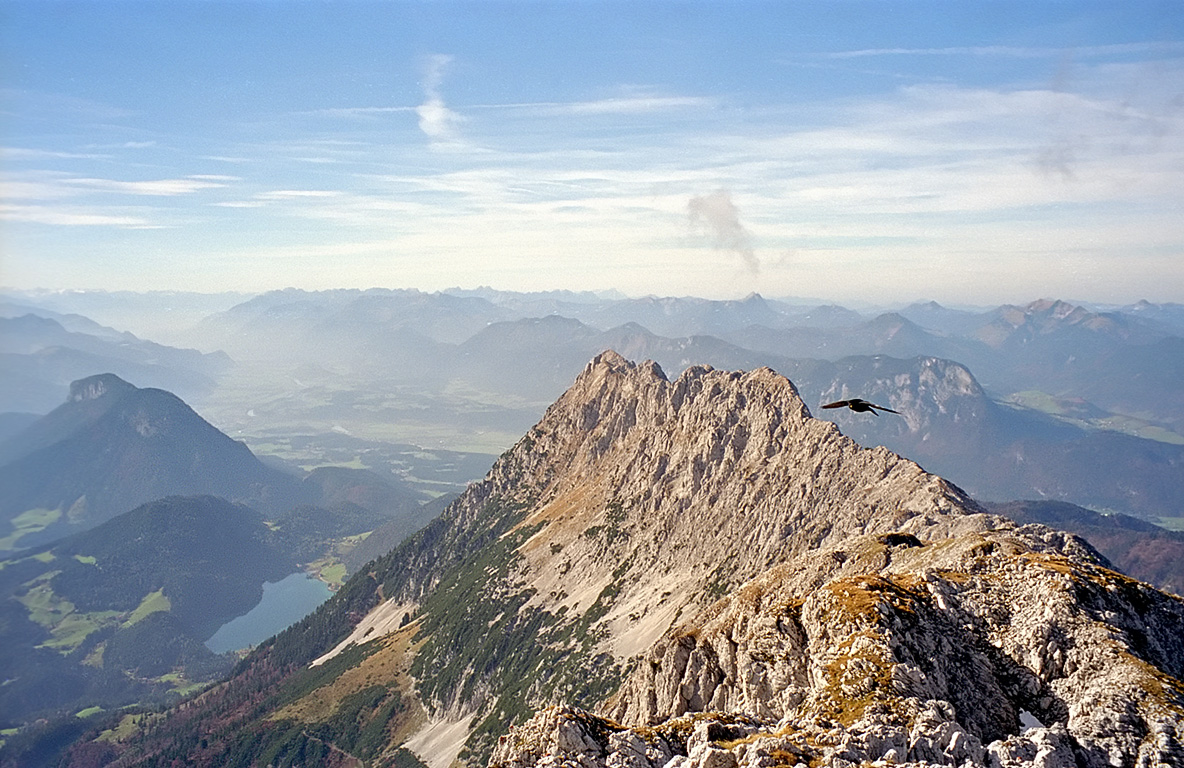
- The Hackenköpfe in the centre of the arête. At the left-hand end is the Scheffauer. View from the Kopfkraxe (2178 m) to the east.

Highest point
- Elevation: 2,126 m (AA) (6,975 ft)
- Coordinates: 47°33′40″N 12°15′18″E

Geography
- Location within Austria
- Location: Tyrol, Austria
- Parent range: Kaisergebirge

Climbing
- Easiest route: Bärnstatt - Steiner Hochalm - Scheffauer - Hackenköpfe

The Hackenköpfe are a row of peaks in the western Kaisergebirge range in Austria. Their maximum height is 2,126 metres (6,975 ft). They are located in the ridge running west from the Sonneck between the Treffauer and Scheffauer. To the north their rock faces, up to 800 metres high, drop into the Kaisertal valley; to the south they present steep, craggy rock flanks. They are typically scaled either over the arête from the Sonneck or along the one from the Scheffauer. Both normal routes include sections of UIAA grade II climbs and are not signed or secured. A popular but challenging crossing exists, which is a crossing of the crest running from the Scheffauer to the Sonneck from the base at Scheffau am Wilden Kaiser. This crossing also involves the Hackenköpfe.
