= Treffauer =

Kaiser Mountain of the Alps

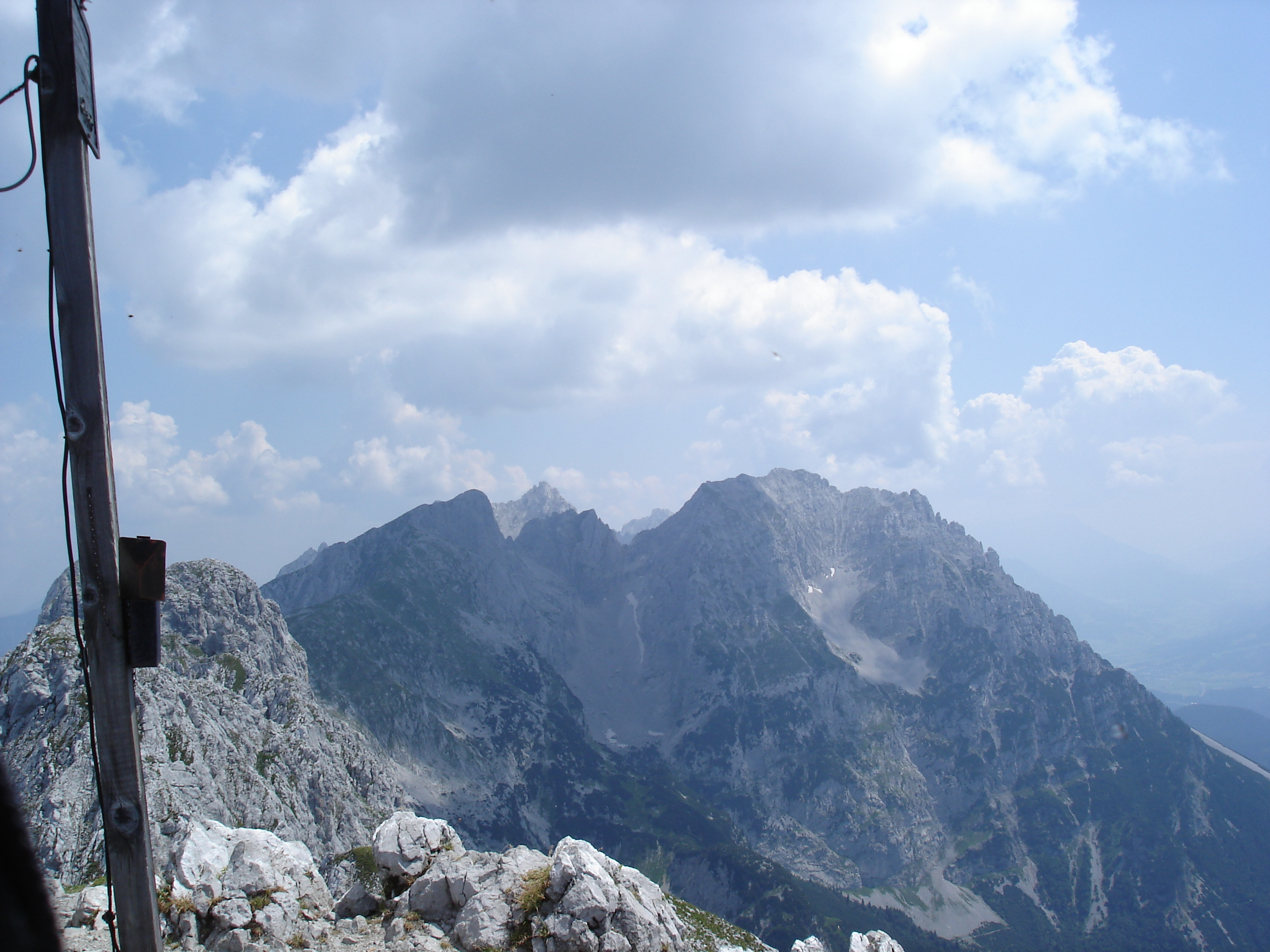
- The Treffauer from the west

Highest point
- Elevation: 2,304 m (AA) (7,559 ft)
- Coordinates: 47°33′19″N 12°17′29″E

Geography
- Location within Austria
- Location: Tyrol, Austria
- Parent range: Kaisergebirge

Climbing
- Normal route: Scheffau - Jägerwirt - Kaiser Hochalm - Schneekar - Treffauer

At 2,304 metres (7,559 ft), the Treffauer is the third highest mountain in the Kaisergebirge range of the Alps. It lies in the Austrian state of Tyrol.

== Location ==
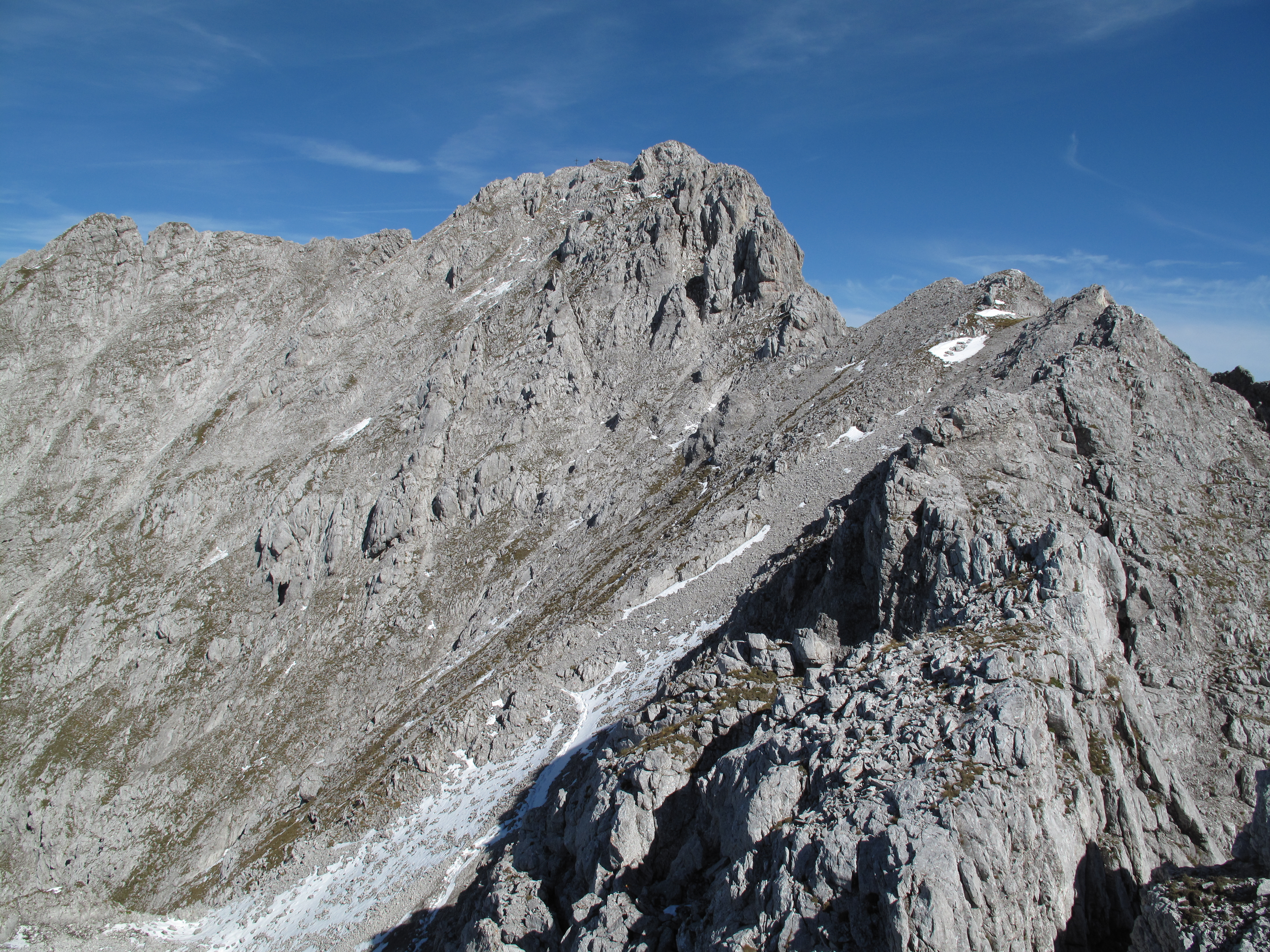
The Treffauer seen from the Tuxeck

The Treffauer rises south of the main ridge and is therefore the most striking mountain in the Wilder Kaiser. Somewhat separated to the north of the Treffauer the long main ridge runs from west to east between the Scheffauer, Sonneck and Zentralkaiser around the Ellmauer Halt. In front of it to the south is the Tuxeck (2,226 m above sea level (AA)).

== Routes ==
The ascent of the Treffauer is classified as a demanding mountaineering route that requires alpine experience, physical fitness, sure-footedness, and a head for heights. The standard route begins in Scheffau and proceeds via the Jägerwirt, the alpine meadow of the Kaiser Hochalm, the Snow Cirque (Schneekar), and the shaded western flank, taking approximately four hours to reach the summit cross. This approach is less technically challenging than the route on the neighboring Ellmauer Halt. An alternative route involves crossing to the Tuxeck and descending to the Grutten Hut, which features unsecured climbing sections graded up to UIAA grade III alongside an increased risk of rockfalls in the terrain.

.
