= Tuxeck =

Mountain in Austria

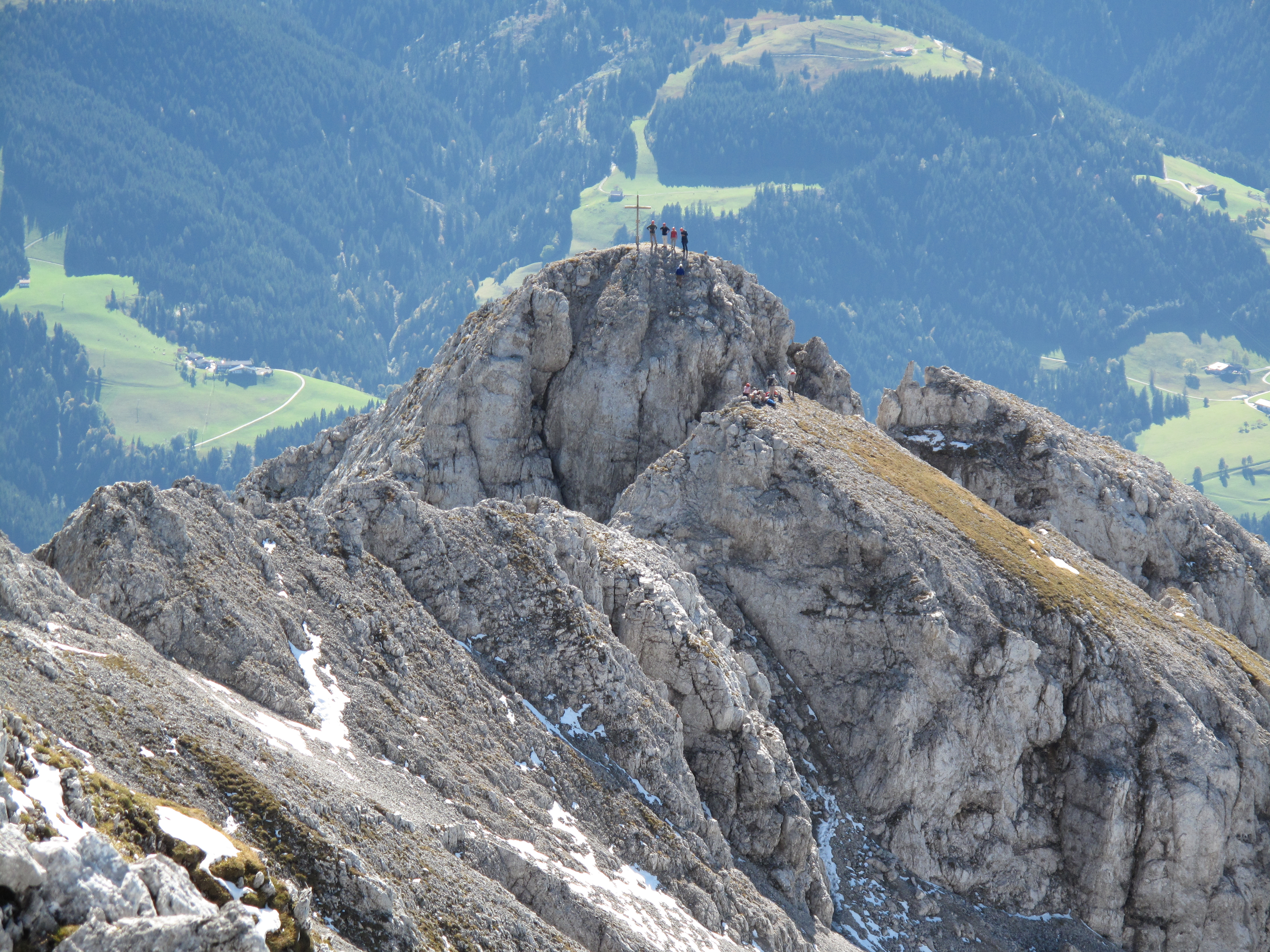
- The summit of the Tuxeck seen from the Treffauer

Highest point
- Elevation: 2,226 m (AA) (7,303 ft)
- Coordinates: 47°33′08″N 12°17′20″E

Geography
- Location within Austria
- Location: Tyrol, Austria
- Parent range: Kaisergebirge

Climbing
- First ascent: J. Enzensperger and H. Hahn on 14 August 1897
- Normal route: Scheffau - Jägerwirt - Tuxeck (III at the summit block)

The Tuxeck (or Tuxegg) is a 2,226 m (AA) high mountain in the Kaisergebirge range in the Austrian state of Tyrol. It lies south of the Treffauer and is also called the Ellmauer Hochkaiser.

== Routes ==
A signed trail to the top runs from the Jägerwirt inn near Scheffau from the southwest. Only the last 10 m to the summit are UIAA climbing grade III (alleviated by a few iron rings, but steep and exposed), the rest is no more difficult than grade I, but there is a danger of falling rocks.

Another climb to the summit runs approaches from the east, from the Grutten Hut along the Schutterfeldköpfe. This formerly signed ascent is no longer maintained, however, and is crumbly and prone to rock falls (as at 2005).

There is also a signed crossing between the Tuxeck and the Treffauer. This is the route chosen by J. Enzensperger and H. Hahn on 14 August 1897 when they became the first climbers to conquer the Tuxeck.

It is hard to find more difficult climbing routes here. The southern arête (grade IV) is hardly ever used and is only of historic interest; other climbs like those from the southwest (II) or the south face (II) are unimportant.

== Literature ==
- Horst Höfler; Jan Piepenstock (2006), Deutscher Alpenverein; Österreichischer Alpenverein; Alpenverein Südtirol (eds.), Alpenvereinsführer Kaisergebirge alpin: Alle Routen für Wanderer und Bergsteiger, München: Rother, pp. 108–110, ISBN 978-3-7633-1257-3
