= Zettenkaiser =

Mountain in Austria

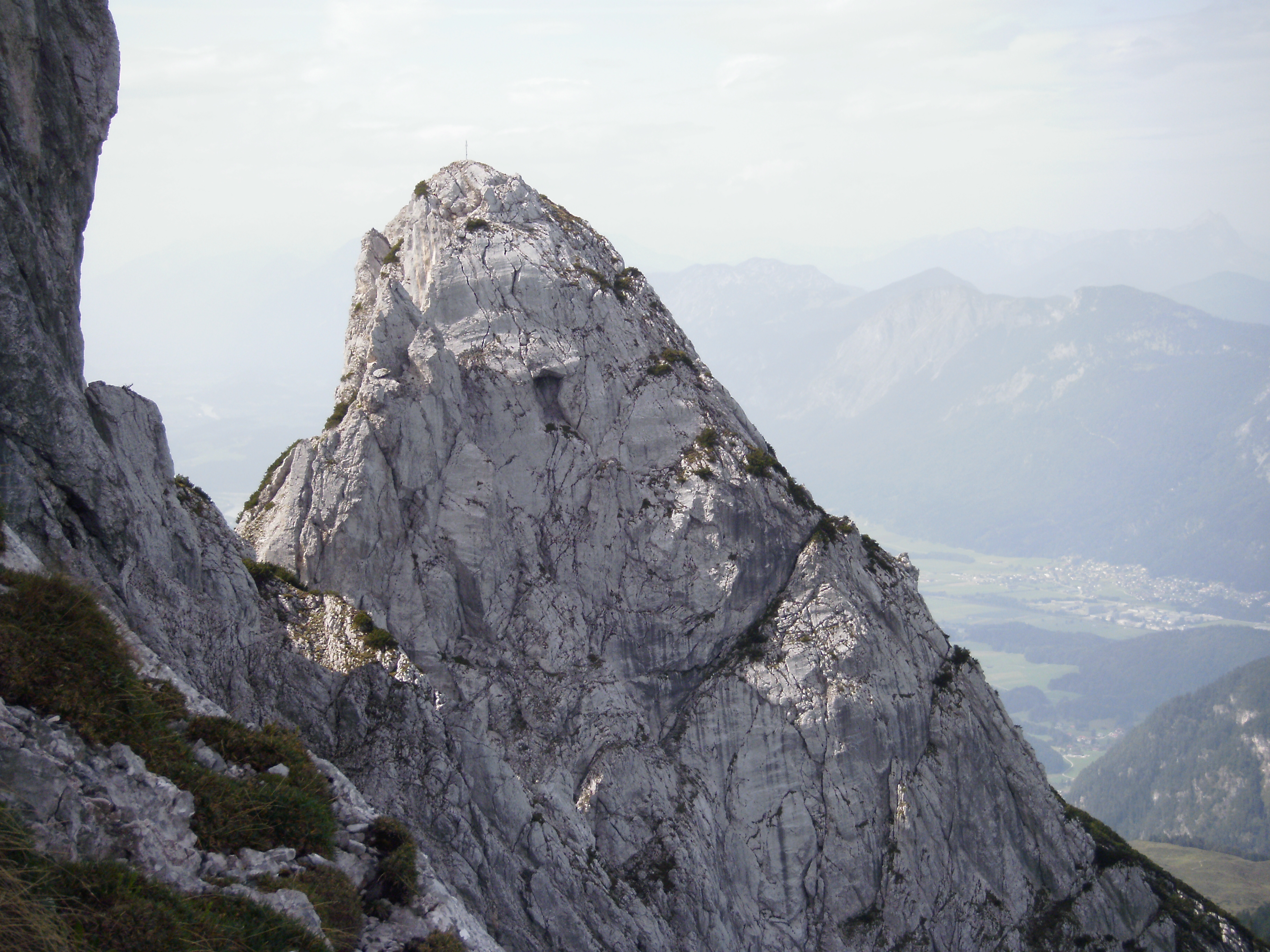
- The Zettenkaiser from the NE

Highest point
- Elevation: 1,968 m (AA) (6,457 ft)
- Prominence: 76 m ↓ col with the Scheffauer
- Isolation: 0.19 km → Scheffauer
- Coordinates: 47°33′25″N 12°14′08″E

Geography
- Location within Austria
- Location: Tyrol, Austria
- Parent range: Kaiser Mountains

Climbing
- Normal route: Kufstein – Kaindl Hut – Großer and Kleiner Friedhof – Zettenkaiser

The Zettenkaiser is a 1,968 m high mountain with a summit cross in the Kaiser Mountains (Kaisergebirge) in the Northern Limestone Alps in Austria. It rises to the west of the almost 150-metre-higher Scheffauer, from which it is separated by a col. It is one of the more rarely visited summits in the Kaiser. There are great views south to the main chain of the Alps, north to the Zahmer Kaiser and west into the Inn Valley; to the east at the foot of the summit is the rock needle known as the Kaindlnadel and then the mighty Scheffauer.

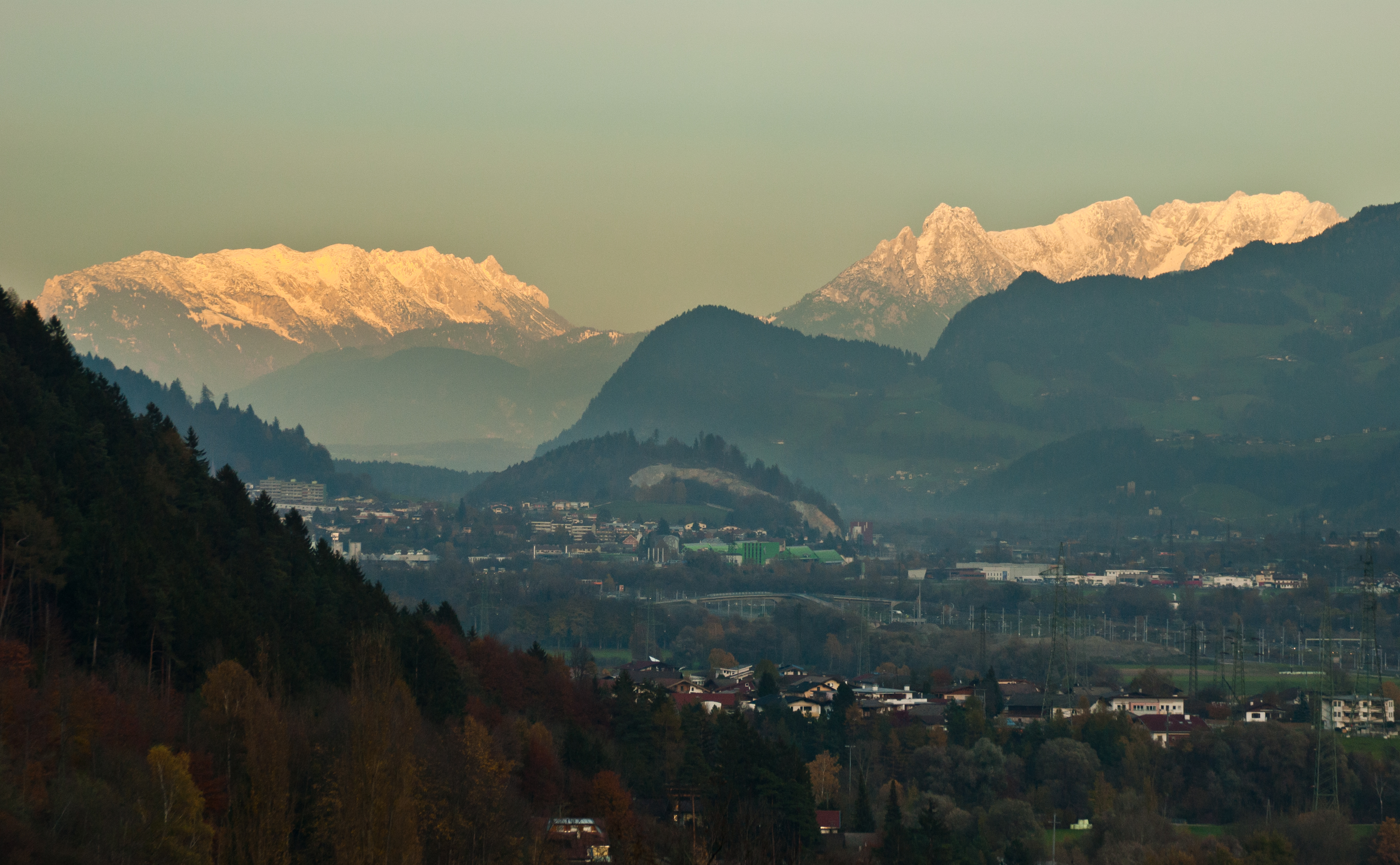
The Zettenkaiser (centre rear) of the right hand mountain chain. View from Vomp

== Routes ==
The waymarked normal route starts by the privately run Kaindl Hut (1,293m), runs via the Großer and Kleiner Friedhof (two cirques), up a 3 to 4-metre-high rock step (grade I/II) and gullies in mountain pine terrain in order to reach the western arête at about 1,700 metres. The arête is not particularly difficult (grade I), but is exposed in places however and requires a head for heights and sure-footedness. There is no protection and the waymarks have faded in places (as at 2013); if one leaves the route the ascent becomes markedly more difficult.

== Literature and map ==
- Horst Höfler, Jan Piepenstock: Kaisergebirge alpin. Alpenvereinsführer alpin für Wanderer und Bergsteiger (= Alpenvereinsführer). 12th edn. Bergverlag Rother, Munich, 2006, ISBN 3-7633-1257-9.
- Pit Schubert: Kaisergebirge extrem. Alpenvereinsführer für Kletterer (= Alpenvereinsführer). Bergverlag Rother, Munich, 2000, ISBN 3-7633-1272-2
- Alpine Club Map 1:25,000, Kaisergebirge, Sheet 8.
