= Scheffauer =

Mountain in the Kaiser mountain range of the Northern Limestone Alps

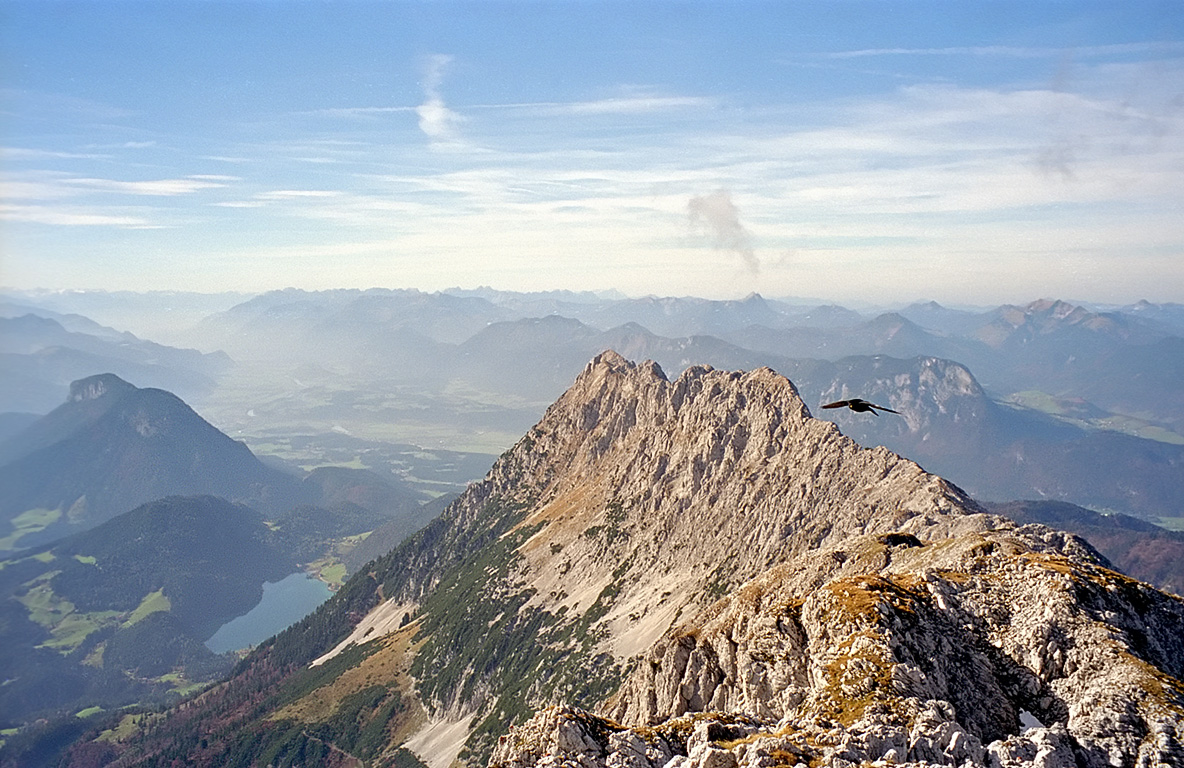
- The Scheffauer (far end of the ridge)

Highest point
- Elevation: 2,111 m (AA) (6,926 ft)
- Coordinates: 47°33′26″N 12°14′30″E

Geography
- Location within Austria
- Location: Tyrol, Austria
- Parent range: Kaisergebirge

Climbing
- Easiest route: Hintersteiner See – Bärnstatt – Steiner Hochalm – Scheffauer

The Scheffauer is a 2,111 m-high mountain in the Kaiser mountain range of the Northern Limestone Alps. It forms the western buttress of the Wilder Kaiser and is one of the most frequented summits in the Kaiser.

== Location ==
The Scheffauer belongs to the lesser summits of the Wilder Kaiser and guards the western flank of the main crest of the mountain range. To the north and south mighty rock faces, up to 600 metres high, plunge into the valleys. At the southern foot of the Scheffauer lies Lake Hinterstein; to the west it is linked to the rarely visited Zettenkaiser, whilst to the east it is connected to the ridge of the Hackenköpfe. A worthwhile but difficult hike runs along this ridge to the Sonneck.

== Routes ==
There are two frequently used routes to scale the Scheffauer; both are signposted and sufficiently secured.

- from the south: the normal route begins in Scheffau am Wilden Kaiser and runs from the Bärnstatt Inn (Gasthaus) via the Alpine meadow of Steiner-Hochalm and across the steep, sunny, but less arduous schrofen on the southern flank of the mountain up to the summit cross. Duration: 3 hours.
- from the north: the starting point for this route is the privately run Kaindl Hut. From there the path runs along the Widauersteig (a secured Klettersteig, UIAA climbing grade I) through the shadowed northern flank, largely over rocky terrain to the summit, more challenging than the southern route, duration from the Kaindl Hut: 2.5 hours.
