= SkiWelt =

Austrian ski resort

Coordinates: 47.5139858°N 12.2092381°E

SkiWelt Wilder Kaiser - Brixental
- The Current SkiWelt Logo (Copyright - SkiWelt Wilder Kaiser - Brixental 2016)
- Interactive map of SkiWelt Wilder Kaiser - Brixental
- Location: Tirol, Austria
- Nearest city: Innsbruck
- Lift system: 90
- Terrain parks: 3

The SkiWelt Wilder Kaiser - Brixental is one of the largest interconnected ski area in Austria. It has 90 cable car lifts and ski lifts, 280 kilometres (170 mi) of ski pistes, and 77 ski huts. The member villages are: Brixen im Thale, Ellmau, Going, Hopfgarten, Itter, Kelchsau, Scheffau, Söll and Westendorf.

== Lifts ==
There are:

15 Cable cars

18 Detachable chairlifts

18 Chairlifts

19 Drag lifts

20 Practice lifts

As of 2018-19 season, these are all of the current ski lifts.

Lift	Type	Length, m	Carrying capacity/hour	Manufacturer	Ski resort	Replaced lift
Hartkaiserbahn (YOC 2015)	10pers. Gondola lift with seat heating (monocable circulating ropeway)	2100	3200	Doppelmayr	Ellmau	120pers. Funicular
Choralmbahn (YOC 2008)	8pers. Gondola lift (monocable circulating ropeway)	2200	2400	Doppelmayr	Westendorf	1pers. Chairlift (fixed-grip)
Salvenbahn II (YOC 2008)	8pers. Gondola lift (monocable circulating ropeway)	1775	2400	Doppelmayr	Hopfgarten	1pers. Chairlift (fixed-grip)
SkiWeltbahn (YOC 2008)	8pers. Gondola lift (monocable circulating ropeway)	3410	2400	Doppelmayr	Brixen im Thale	
Ki-West Bahn (YOC 2005)	8pers. Gondola lift (monocable circulating ropeway)	3000	2400	Doppelmayr	Westendorf	
Salvenbahn I (YOC 2004)	8pers. Gondola lift (monocable circulating ropeway)	2120	2400	Doppelmayr	Hopfgarten	2pers. Chairlift (fixed-grip)
Brandstadl Sek. 1 (YOC 2002)	8pers. Gondola lift (monocable circulating ropeway)	2237	2800	Doppelmayr	Scheffau	2pers. Chairlift (fixed-grip)
Brandstadl Sek. 2 (YOC 2002)	8pers. Gondola lift (monocable circulating ropeway)	1072	2800	Doppelmayr	Scheffau	2pers. Chairlift (fixed-grip)
Hohe Salve (YOC 2000)	8pers. Gondola lift (monocable circulating ropeway)	1837	2400	Doppelmayr	Söll	1pers. Chairlift (fixed-grip)
Hochsöll	8pers. Gondola lift (monocable circulating ropeway)	1900	2800	Doppelmayr	Söll	1pers. Chairlift (fixed-grip)
Alpenrosenbahn I	6pers. Gondola lift (monocable circulating ropeway)	1500	2000	Doppelmayr	Westendorf	
Alpenrosenbahn II	6pers. Gondola lift (monocable circulating ropeway)	1600	2000	Doppelmayr	Westendorf	
Hochbrixen (YOC 1986)	6pers. Gondola lift (monocable circulating ropeway)	1800	2000	Doppelmayr	Brixen im Thale	2pers. Chairlift (fixed-grip)
Salvistabahn (YOC 1989)	4pers. Gondola lift (monocable circulating ropeway)	2200	1800	Doppelmayr	Itter	2pers. Chairlift (fixed-grip)
Brandstadlbahn (YOC 1984)	4pers. Gondola lift (monocable circulating ropeway)	3300	1800	Doppelmayr	Scheffau	
Jochbahn (YOC 2015)	8pers. High speed chairlift (detachable) with bubble and seat heating	2000	3000	Doppelmayr	Brixen im Thale	4pers. Chairlift (fixed-grip)
Aualmbahn (YOC 2014)	8pers. High speed chairlift (detachable) with bubble and seat heating	1038	3700	Doppelmayr	Scheffau	4pers. High speed chairlift (detachable) with bubble
Osthangbahn (YOC 2010)	8pers. High speed chairlift (detachable) with bubble and seat heating	495	3400	Doppelmayr	Scheffau	4pers. Chairlift (fixed-grip)
Foisching (YOC 2000)	8pers. High speed chairlift (detachable)	1416	3300	Doppelmayr	Hopfgarten	T-bar
Schernthannbahn (YOC 2015)	6pers. High speed chairlift (detachable) with bubble and seat heating	1273	2400	Leitner	Hopfgarten	2pers. Chairlift (fixed-grip)
Siller-Keat (YOC 2008)	6pers. High speed chairlift (detachable) with bubble and seat heating	873	2400	Doppelmayr	Söll	3pers. Chairlift (fixed-grip)
Hexen6er (YOC 2004)	6pers. High speed chairlift (detachable) with bubble and seat heating	1250	3000	Doppelmayr	Söll	T-bar
Ellmi's 6er (YOC 2009)	6pers. High speed chairlift (detachable) with seat heating	1220	3000	Doppelmayr	Ellmau	
Tanzboden (YOC 2006)	6pers. High speed chairlift (detachable) with seat heating	710	2400	Doppelmayr	Ellmau	
Kummereralmbahn (YOC 2005)	6pers. High speed chairlift (detachable)	872	2600	Doppelmayr	Scheffau	T-bar
Filzboden (YOC 2002)	6pers. High speed chairlift (detachable)	1754	3000	Doppelmayr	Brixen im Thale	T-bar
Köglbahn (YOC 2000)	6pers. High speed chairlift (detachable)	965	2700	Doppelmayr	Ellmau	T-bar
Almbahn (YOC 1999)	6pers. High speed chairlift (detachable)	1100	2700	Doppelmayr	Ellmau	T-bar
Südhangbahn (YOC 1999)	6pers. High speed chairlift (detachable)	760	2800	Doppelmayr	Scheffau	T-bar
Kälbersalve (YOC 1997)	6pers. High speed chairlift (detachable)	1470	3100	Doppelmayr	Brixen im Thale	T-bar
Keat (YOC 1995)	4pers. High speed chairlift (detachable) with bubble and seat heating	1200	2200	Doppelmayr	Söll	T-bar
Astbergbahn (YOC 1991)	4pers. High speed chairlift (detachable) with bubble	1500	2000	Doppelmayr	Going	1pers. Chairlift (fixed-grip)
Zinsberg (YOC 1987)	4pers. High speed chairlift (detachable) with bubble	1450	2000	Doppelmayr	Brixen im Thale	
Sonnenlift (YOC 2004)	4pers. Chairlift (fixed-grip)	846	2400	Doppelmayr	Going	T-bar
Schneeberg (YOC 2003)	4pers. Chairlift (fixed-grip)	525	2000	Doppelmayr	Westendorf	T-bar
Kaiserexpress (YOC 2002)	4pers. Chairlift (fixed-grip)	590	2400	Doppelmayr	Ellmau	
Windauberg (YOC 2001)	4pers. Chairlift (fixed-grip)	852	2400	Garaventa	Westendorf	T-bar
Gampenkogel (YOC 2001)	4pers. Chairlift (fixed-grip)	757	2400	Garaventa	Westendorf	T-bar
Muldenbahn (YOC 1998)	4pers. Chairlift (fixed-grip)	453	2400	Doppelmayr	Scheffau	T-bar
Rinner (YOC 1995)	4pers. Chairlift (fixed-grip)	549	2000	Doppelmayr	Söll	T-bar
Eiberg I (YOC 1990)	4pers. Chairlift (fixed-grip)	530	2000	Doppelmayr	Scheffau	T-bar
Eiberg II (YOC 1990)	4pers. Chairlift (fixed-grip)	530	2000	Doppelmayr	Scheffau	T-bar
Rigibahn (YOC 1988)	4pers. Chairlift (fixed-grip)	900	2400	Doppelmayr	Hopfgarten	
Talkaser (YOC 1989)	4pers. Chairlift (fixed-grip)	500	2000	SSG	Westendorf	T-bar
Stöckl	4pers. Chairlift (fixed-grip)	800	2000	Doppelmayr	Söll	T-bar
Hohe Salve (YOC 1983)	3pers. Chairlift (fixed-grip)	1100	2000	Girak	Hopfgarten	
Fleiding (YOC 1983)	3pers. Chairlift (fixed-grip)	1100	1600	Girak	Westendorf	
Hausbergbahn (YOC 1988)	2pers. Chairlift (fixed-grip) with bubble	1100	1500	Doppelmayr	Ellmau	
Hofstattbahn (YOC 1972)	2pers. Chairlift (fixed-grip)	1400	1000	Doppelmayr	Kelchsau	
Kasbichl (YOC 1986)	2pers. Chairlift (fixed-grip)	1200	1500	Doppelmayr	Itter	
Hans in Glück (YOC 2016)	10 pers. Gondola lift (monocable circulating ropeway)	500	1500	Doppelmayr	Söll	2pers. Chairlift (fixed-grip)
Hagermoos	T-bar	500	700	Doppelmayr	Kelchsau	
Mittererwies	T-bar	900	700		Itter	
Hagerjoch	T-bar	1150	800	Doppelmayr	Kelchsau	
Ranhart	T-bar	1100	700	Doppelmayr	Ellmau	
Schmiedalm	T-bar	1000	700	Doppelmayr	Ellmau	
Schusterbühel	T-bar	170	500	Doppelmayr	Brixen im Thale	
Kirchbichl	T-bar	430	1000		Ellmau	
Vötterstätt	T-bar	700	700		Ellmau	
Hochalm	T-bar	400	1000	Doppelmayr	Scheffau	
Marcher	T-bar	800	1000		Ellmau	
Ostlift	T-bar	300	1000	Doppelmayr	Scheffau	
Hochfeldlift	T-bar	556	720		Schwoich	
Maxilift (YOC 2011)	J-bar	319	730	Doppelmayr	Going	T-bar
Würstelexpress (YOC 1997)	J-bar	162	800	Doppelmayr	Brixen im Thale	
Poldanger	J-bar	300	1000	Doppelmayr	Brixen im Thale	
Knolln	J-bar	500	700	Doppelmayr	Söll	
Laubkogel (YOC 2018)	J-bar	300	700	Doppelmayr	Westendorf	J-bar
Babylift Itter (YOC 2014)	Rope tow/beginner lift	100	800	SunKid	Itter	
Wagnerfeld	Rope tow/beginner lift	300	700		Going	
Babylift Kelchsau	Rope tow/beginner lift	90	500		Kelchsau	
Übungslift Brandlfeld	Rope tow/beginner lift	220	500		Going	
Übungslift Söll (Tennfeld)	Rope tow/beginner lift	200	500		Söll	
Sonnenlift	Rope tow/beginner lift	205	800	SunKid	Brixen im Thale	
Bärenlift	Rope tow/beginner lift	300	700		Ellmau	
Übungslift Dorf	Rope tow/beginner lift	200	500		Scheffau	
Übungslift Hochbrixen	Rope tow/beginner lift	120	500		Brixen im Thale	
Übungslift Berg	Rope tow/beginner lift	150	500		Scheffau	
Sammer	Rope tow/beginner lift	270	500		Westendorf	
Skischullift Hochbrixen	Rope tow/beginner lift	100	500		Brixen im Thale	
Sternfeld I	Rope tow/beginner lift	230	500		Ellmau	
Babylift	Rope tow/beginner lift	100	500		Scheffau	
Sternfeld II	Rope tow/beginner lift	230	500		Ellmau	
Kaiser-Übungslift	Rope tow/beginner lift	100	500		Ellmau	
Übungslift Hochfeld	Rope tow/beginner lift	125	500		Schwoich	
Högerfeld	Rope tow/beginner lift	100	500		Hopfgarten	
Schmiedfeld	Rope tow/beginner lift	100	500		Hopfgarten	
Hexenkinderland	Rope tow/beginner lift	100	500		Söll	
Sonnenband	Rope tow/beginner lift	40	600		Brixen im Thale	

== History ==
1946 Establishment of the Westendorf Ski Lifts, the oldest company in the SkiWelt. They experienced serious difficulties in the postwar years concerning the construction costs and the amount of materials determined by the authorities

1947 Establishment of the Hopfgarten Ski Lifts. The longest chairlift in Europe (2,830m) was built in 1954, however the top station and two supports were destroyed by an avalanche.

1948 Construction of the "Alpenrosenlift" - then Austria's biggest ski lift (2,205m long) In the winter of 1948/49, a total of 22,289 winter sports enthusiasts were transported

=== 1950-1960 ===
1952 Establishment of a ski school in Westendorf

1954 Installation of the "Stricklift" drag lift in Westendorf

1959 Establishment of the Söll Ski Lifts and construction of the "Angeralm" drag lift

=== 1960-1970 ===
1960 The "Stricklift" drag lift was converted into a double T-bar

1961 Construction of the "Zieplhöfe" drag lift in Westendorf

1962 Establishment of the Scheffau ski lift company (Schilift Scheffau am Wilden Kaiser GesmbH) by 66 citizens of Scheffau.

1964 Construction of the "Kandleralm" drag lift in Brixen

1965 Construction of the Söll-Hochsöll single chairlift and the Hochsöll drag lift

1966 Hopfgarten buys its first "Ratrak" snow groomer Construction of the "Salvenmoos" drag lift in Hopfgarten

1967 Construction of the "Knolln" drag lift

1968 Transportation of the 2,000,000th passenger on the Hohe Salve lift Construction of the "Stöckl" drag lift in Söll

1969 Construction of the "Taklaser" drag lift and the "Alpenrose II" single chair lift in Westendorf Chairlift at SkiWelt Hopfgarten Chairlift at SkiWelt Hopfgarten

=== 1970-1980 ===
1970 Establishment of the development company "Erschließungsgesellschaft Ellmau GmbH", Construction of the "Sonnberg" lifts in Brixen Construction of the single chair lift on the Hohe Salve in Söll

1971 Construction of the "Hartkaiserbahn" funicular in Ellmau Establishment of the Scheffau Lift Company (Bergbahn Scheffau am Wilder Kaiser GesmbH) Westendorf Lift Company holds a third of the company.

1971/72 First billing for travel between Hopfgarten and Söll. No adjustment payments made Construction of the "Rinner" drag lift in Söll

1972 Opening of the "Hartkaiserbahn" funicular in Ellmau Construction of the "Alpenrose 1B" chairlift in Westendorf Construction of the double chairlift "Scheffau – Brandstadl" section I and section II, Construction of the temporary mountain restaurant, construction of the "Ostlift", construction of the "Eiberglift"

1972/73 Weekly ticket valid between Scheffau and Ellmau

1973 Construction of the "Laubkogel" drag lift in Westendorf Construction of the "Aualmlift" in Scheffau

1973/74 Tickets valid between Scheffau and Brixen – individual tickets paid in cash, with account settlement

1974 Introduction of a 7-day greater-area ski pass valid at Brixen im Thale, Ellmau, Going, Hopfgarten, Itter, Scheffau and Söll, no offsetting

1975 Construction of the "Fleiding" chairlift in Westendorf Construction of the Söll-Hochsoll double chairlift Construction of the "Südlift", Construction of the "Weissachlift", Construction of the building at the chairlift bottom station in Scheffau 1977 Amalgamation to create the greater ski area "Wilder Kaiser - Brixental", and first sales of all tickets, from single to season tickets, for the greater ski area, without offsetting Construction of the new "Brandstadl" mountain restaurant in Scheffau 1978 Seal of approval for slope quality is awarded Construction of the "Grundried" drag lift

=== 1980-1990 ===
1980 Construction of the "Ostlift II", Construction of the "Eiberglift II" in Scheffau

1982 Construction of the "Windauberg" and "Gampenkogel" drag lifts in Westendorf Construction of the "Muldenlift" in Scheffau

1984 Construction of the "Brandstadlbahn" gondola in Scheffau

1985 Conclusion of a pooling agreement with ride offsetting between the villages of Brixen im Thale, Hopfgarten, Itter, Söll, Scheffau, Ellmau, Going and Westendorf (had just joined the greater ski area). 10% share agreed on. Installation of readers and ticket counters for SkiWelt billing in Scheffau Construction of the "Pendelbahn" lift and "Silleralm" three-seater chairlift in Söll With the construction of the Silleralm hut, the installation of the "Filzboden" drag lift provided a direct connection from Söll to Scheffau via Brixen

1986 Construction of the Hochbrixen gondola in Brixen Operation of the "Itter – Kraftalm" double chair lift and the "Kasbichl" double chair lift in Itter Due to a lack of snow in the winters of the 1980s, SkiWelt Wilder Kaiser - Brixental acquired its first snowmaking equipment

1987 Installation of the first snowmaking system in Brixen Construction of the first "bubble" - the four-seater chairlift on the Zinsberg in Brixen Construction of the "Alpenrosenbahn", a 6-seater monocable gondola in two sections in Westendorf Construction of the "Hochalmlift" in Scheffau

1988 Construction of the "Söll-Hochsöll" gondola, the "Stöckl" 4-seater chairlift and the "Salvenmoos" double chair in Söll Construction of the "Aualmbahn" lift, Construction of the "Osthangbahn" lift, Construction of the new "Ostlift" in Scheffau

1989 Installation of the snowmaking system on the valley run in Ellmau Construction of the "Taklaser" 4-seater chairlift (replacing the drag lift) in Westendorf Installation of the snowmaking system in Hochsöll and purchase of the first diesel snow cannon Inauguration of the "Salvista gondola" in Itter and 40th anniversary celebration of the Hohe Salve Lift Company.

=== 1990-2000 ===
1990 Name of the greater ski area changed from Wilder Kaiser-Brixental to SkiWelt Wilder Kaiser - Brixental First snowmaking system at Stöckl – Salvenmoos – Rinner, supplied by the Stampfangerbach stream and purchase of 6 Crystal snow cannons in Hopfgarten

1991 Construction of the "Eibergbahn I + II" lift in Scheffau

1991/95 Installation of the snowmaking system in Westendorf

1992 Construction of the reservoir and installation of the snowmaking system in Scheffau

1993 Construction of the mid boarding point for the "Fleiding" three-seater lift in Westendorf

1994/95 The Scheffau Lift Company acquires an interest in the Brixen-im-Thale Lift Company

1995 Construction of the "Keat" detachable 4-seater chairlift and "Rinner" 4-seater chairlift in Söll "Keat - Grundried" snowmaking system and purchase of 15 fully automatic snow cannons in Söll Construction of the "Jochbahn" lift in Brixen

1996 Valley run snowmaking up to the mountain in Scheffau

1997 Introduction of a Kitzbühel Alps 6-day pass with offsetting for approx. 260 lifts Merger of "Goinger und Ellmauer GmbH" into "Sportcenter Ellmau-Going GmbH" Installation of the snowmaking system for Silleralm – Antlasseealm – Angeralm valley run in Söll Construction of the Lechen and Inner-Keat reservoirs in Söll Construction of the "Muldenbahn" lift in Scheffau Construction of the "Kälbersalvbahn" lift in Brixen

1998 Construction of the "Kreuzjöchl" reservoir in Westendorf and expansion of the snowmaking system Construction of the "Südhangbahn" lift, snowmaking on remaining valley run. Construction of the Kaiserland building in Scheffau

1999 First reservoir on the Hartkaiser with pumping station for the snowmaking systems in Ellmau Founding of the tourist board "Wilder Kaiser-Brixental Tourismus GmbH" by the tourist associations and ski lift companies of the SkiWelt Wilder Kaiser-Brixental. The tourist board (Tourismus GmbH) looks after the marketing agendas of its shareholders.

=== 2000 - 2010 ===
2000 Construction of the Hohe Salve gondola in Söll Installation of the "Grundried – Hohe Salve – Rigi" snowmaking system in Söll Construction of the "Köglbahn" 6-seater chairlift in Ellmau Construction of the "Foisching" 8-seater chairlift in Hopfgarten Renovation of the Free Flow mountain restaurant and raising of the reservoir in Scheffau

2001 Replacement of the "Windauberg" and "Gampenkogel" drag lifts with modern 4-seater chairlifts in Westendorf

2002 Construction of the "Brandstadl" 8-seater monocable gondola, bottom lift station and parking deck (buffet conversion, Sternbar) in Scheffau Construction of the Filzalmsee reservoir in Brixen

2003 Replacement of the "Schneeberg I + II" drag lifts with a 4-seater chairlift with child safety bars in Westendorf Construction of the "Kaiserexpress" 4-seater chairlift in Ellmau Construction of the "Filzbodenbahn" lift in Brixen

2004 Construction of the "Hexen6er" detachable 6-seater chairlift in Ellmau Construction of the "KaiserWelt" play area (playground at the Brandstadl mountain restaurant and in the forest) in Scheffau

2005 Construction of the "KiWest" 8-seater monocable gondola and a ski run with snowmaking to Aschau, connection to the Kitzbühel ski area Construction of the "Kummereralmbahn" 6-person detachable chairlift and snowmaking on the slope in Scheffau

2006 Construction of the "Tanzboden" 6-seater chairlift in Ellmau and opening of the Mountain Theme Park "Ellmi's Zauberwelt". Opening of the Kaiser shop on the Brandstadl, village snowmaking system (cross country track) in Scheffau

2007 Construction of the Salvensee reservoir in Hopfgarten Installation go the snowmaking system for the "Hexenritt" toboggan run in Söll

2008 Construction of the "Choralmbahn" 8-seater monocable gondola in Westendorf Construction of the "SkiWeltbahn" 8-seater monocable gondola in Westendorf Construction of the "Salvenbahn II" 8-seater monocable gondola in Hopfgarten Construction of the "Siller – Keat" 6-seater chairlift in Söll Modification of the "Hartkaiserbahn" lift in Ellmau (controls) Summer expansion of the Jochstube reservoir from 70,000 m^{3} to 180,000 m^{3} in Scheffau Construction of the "Skiweltbahn" lift with snowmaking above the Kandleralm in Brixen

2009 Construction of the 6-seater chairlift, "Ellmi's 6er", and the Tanzboden reservoir with pumping station in Ellmau Construction of the Choralmbahn at SkiWelt Westendorf Construction of the Choralmbahn at SkiWelt Westendorf Construction of the Salvenbahn II at SkiWelt Hopfgarten Construction of the Salvenbahn II at SkiWelt Hopfgarten

=== 2010-2011 ===
2010 Construction of the "Osthangbahn" – detachable 8-seater chairlift with child safety bars, heated seats and lifting platform in Scheffau.

2011 New Moon toboggan run in Söll – open nights only – length 3.5 km Expansion of the Astberg reservoir in Going and new platter lift on the nursery slope Expansion of the Hopfgarten valley run (no. 20) SkiMovie route on the Südhang slope in Scheffau Free WiFi on SkiWelt mountains Construction of the "Osthangbahn" at SkiWelt Brixen

=== 2012-2022 ===
2021 SkiWelt Wilder Kaiser - Brixental and KitzSki opened the longest ski circuit (85 km) in the world connecting the SkiWelt with the KitzSki ski area in winter 2021.

== Ski Resorts ==
=== Brixen im Thale ===
The Sonnberg Chairlift was extended up to found the Sonnberg area of the resort in 1970. In 1986, a new Gondola lift was built as a replacement for this chairlift. In 1995, the company was transformed into a stock company. The main shareholders are: Bergbahnnen Sheffau GmbH & Co. (85.28%) and the Schilifte (ski lift operators). They have 60 employees in the winter season.

=== Ellmau-Going ===
The roots of the Ellmau area of this resort can be traced back to the setting up of the one-seater chairlift, Sessellift Postbauer, which had 4 ski runs and a toboggan run attached to it. Then, in 1970, Bergbahnnen Ellmau mbH was founded to pursue winter sports facilities in the town. They constructed the Hartkaiser cable railway. This has since been replaced with a 10-seater gondola. They joined the Wilder Kaiser-Brixental ski area in 1985.

In 1998, Bergbahnnen Ellmau mbH merged with Bergbahnnen Going mbH, and renamed themselves Bergbahnnen Ellmau-Going GmbH & Co. Hartkaiserbahn KG.

=== Hochsöll ===
A GmbH was first established in 1959, and they built a drag lift. Today, 2 gondolas stretch from Söll to the Hohe Salve. The Hochsöll area also has the SkiWelt's largest night-skiing area, fully floodlit skiing can occur after 5pm.

=== Hopfgarten - Itter - Kelchsau ===
In 1946 a Ges.mbH was registered in Hopfgarten to build a chairlift. They succeeded in 1949, building the third, and longest ropeway in Tirol.

In 1985, Bergbahnen Hopfgarten merged with Schilifte Itter by the ratio 72:28, reflecting the pistes and lifts owned. In 1991, the company acquired Schilifte Kelchsau, and then, in 1997 declared bankruptcy. In 2008, they went into the red again, only to be saved by 200 shareholders. This was indirectly linked to the development of the Salvenbahn II gondola lift that stretched up to the Hohe Salve.

Kelchsau is only connected by skibus to the rest of the SkiWelt.

=== Scheffau ===
Bergbahnen Scheffau GmbH & Co. KG was founded in 1962. They operate mostly as a link between the Ellmau-Going area in the east, and Brixental or Hochsöll in the west. They have an annual turnover of somewhere in the region of EUR 11 million. A lot of the major SkiWelt constructions have happened in the Scheffau area, or to connect the Scheffau area up with the rest of the SkiWelt. Some examples include: The new Alumbahn (Scheffau) - an 8-seater, heated and covered chairlift, The new Jochbahn (Brixental) - another 8 seater, heated and covered chairlift and the Siller-KEAT (Hochsöll) - A 6-seater covered chairlift.

In the summer season, there is a themed adventure park for kids situated between the exit to the Brandstadlbahn and the Gasthof Brandstadl.

=== Westendorf ===
The ski lift company was founded in 1946. Their first chairlift ran from the valley, near the village to the "Alpenrosenhütte on the Choralpe" on Mt. Nachtsöllberg. At over 2 km long, it was the longest chairlift in Austria at the time. A second (3 seater) chairlift was built 1969, with a middle-station.

== Pictures ==
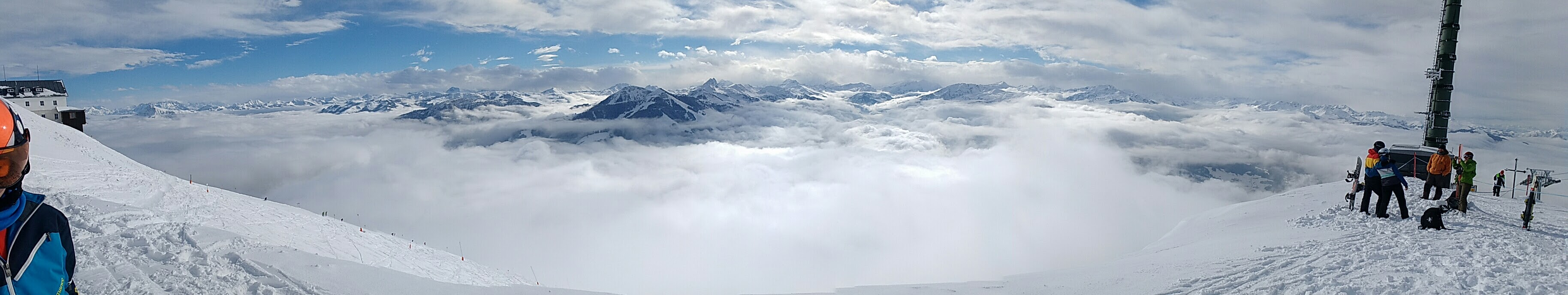
Panorama from the top of the Hohe Salve.

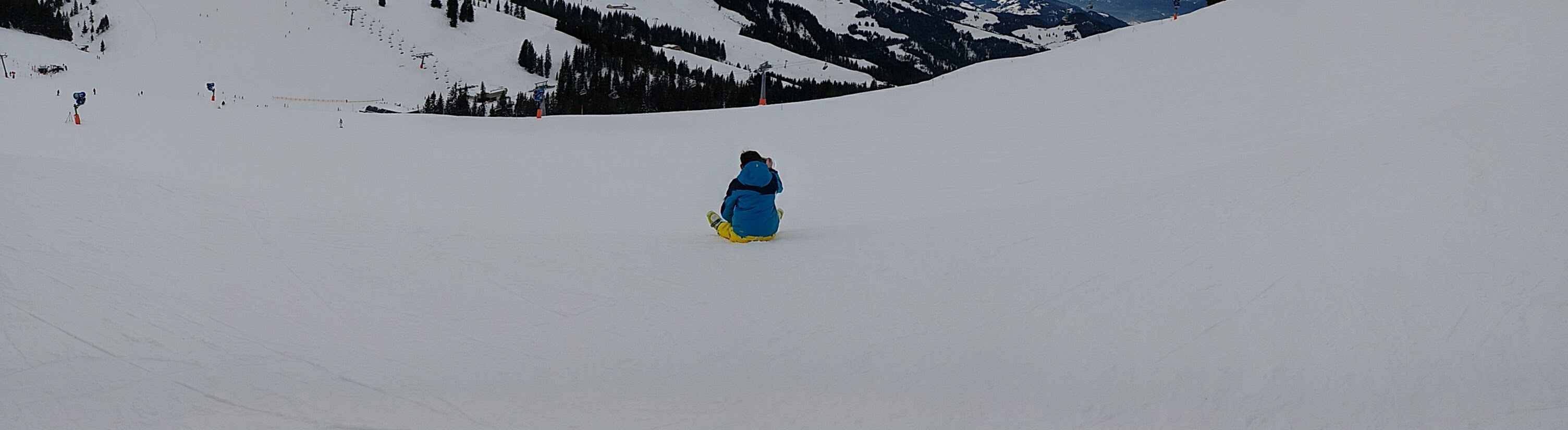
Panorama of the area around the Osthangbahn

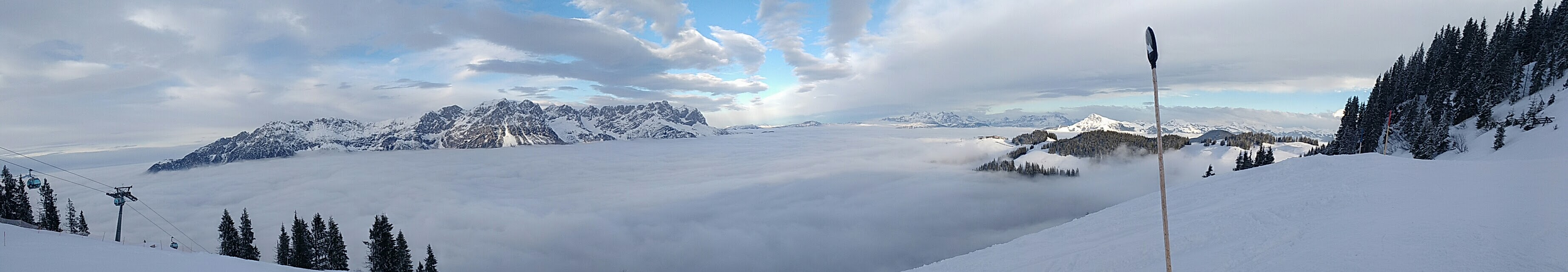
Panorama of the Wilder Kaiser as seen from the top station of the Brandstadlbahn
