= Hintersteiner See =

Lake in Tyrol, Austria

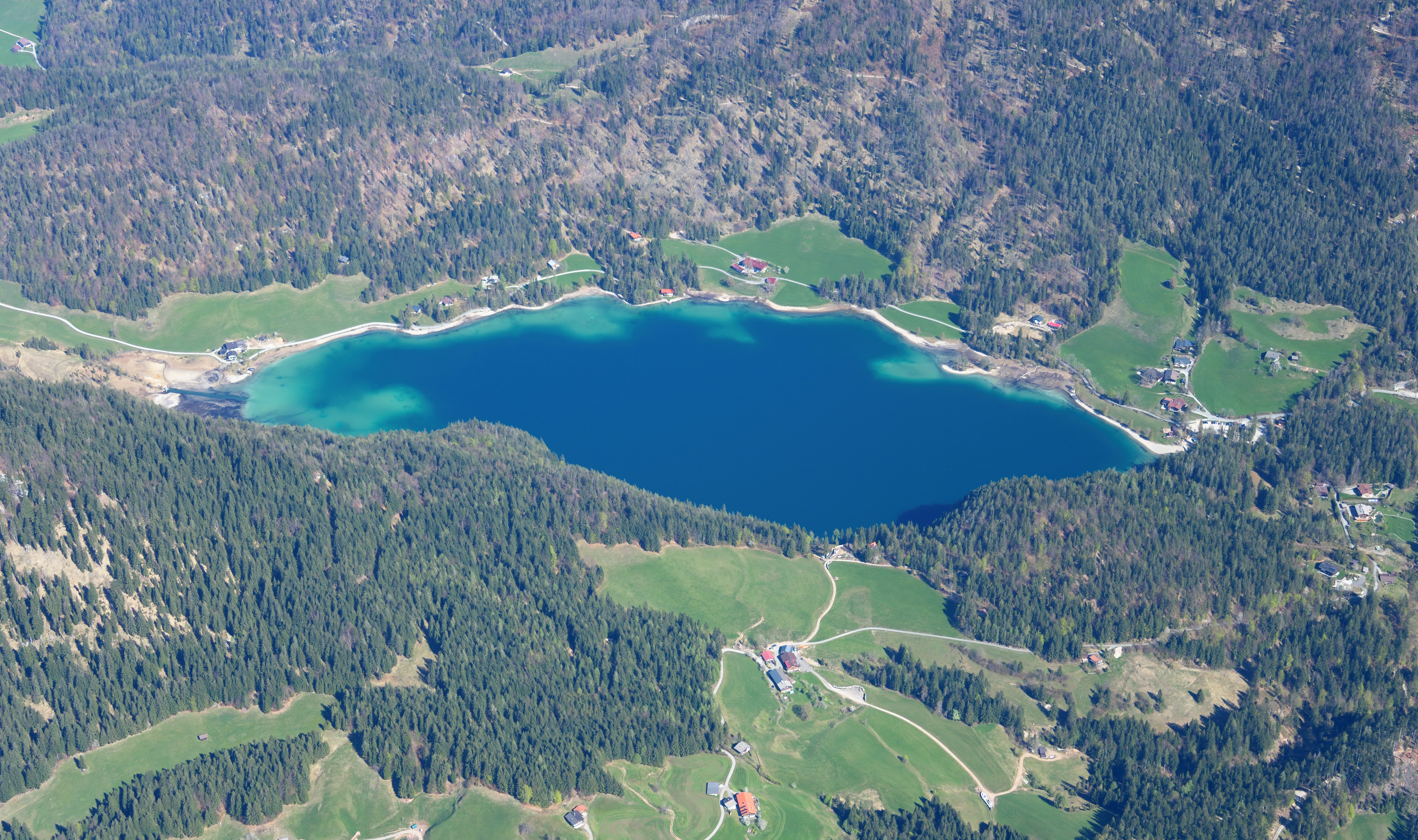
- Aerial view of Hintersteiner See

- Location within Austria
- Location: Wilder Kaiser, Scheffau, Austria
- Coordinates: 47.5333°N 12.2166°E
- Primary outflows: Weißache
- Surface area: 56 ha (140 acres)
- Max. depth: 36 m (118 ft)
- Surface elevation: 883 m (2,897 ft)

Hintersteiner See is a mountain lake in the Wilder Kaiser Austrian national park and belongs to the administrative region of Scheffau in the Austrian federal state of Tirol.

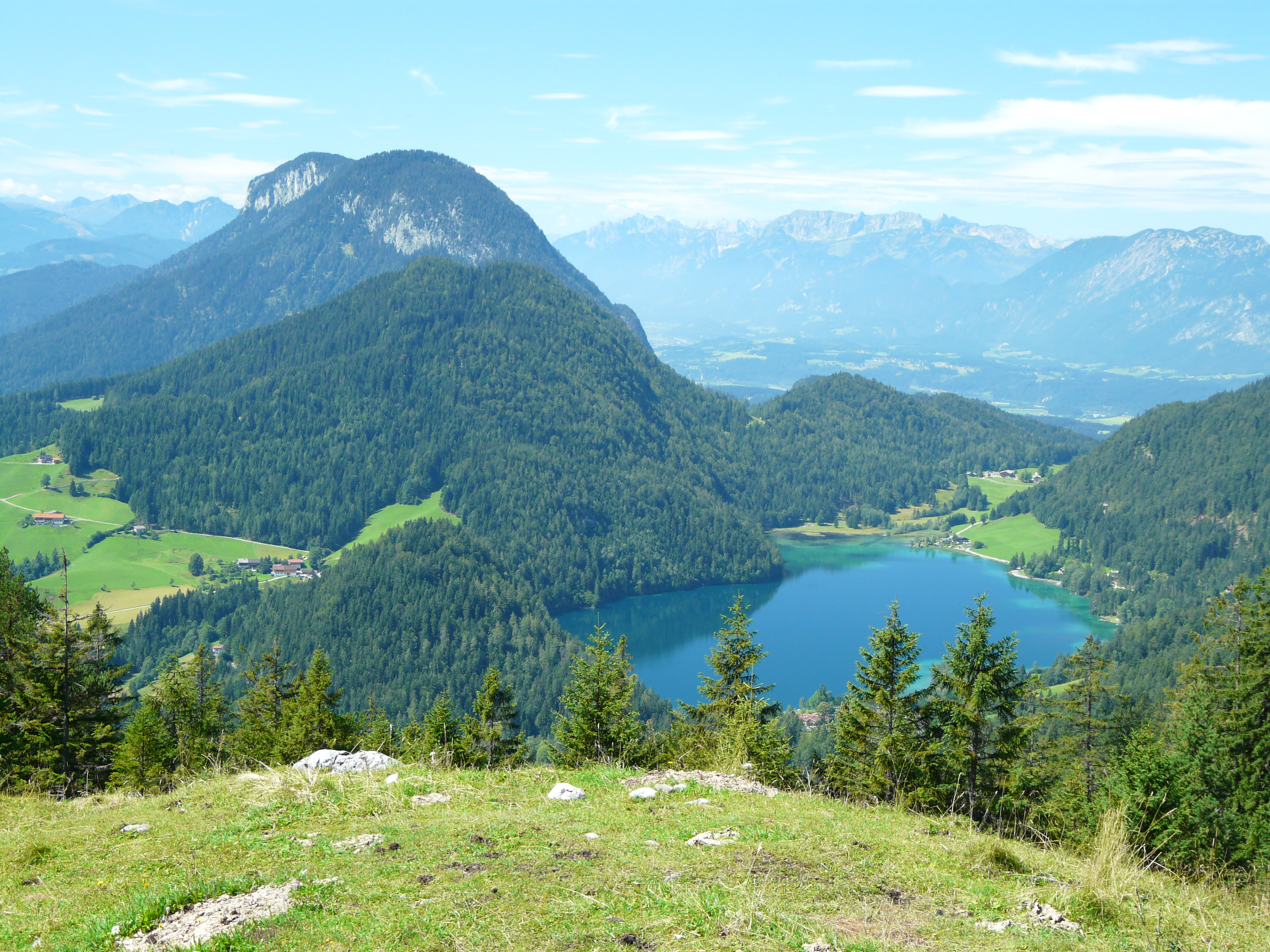
View from the Steiner Hochalm

The 56 hectares (140 acres), 36-metre-deep (118 ft) lake was created during the last ice age and is at a height of 883 m AA. Underground springs fill the lake with crystal-clear water. Hintersteiner See is privately owned by the Tiroler Wasserkraft AG and is cautiously used to generate electricity. It drains into the Weißache river.

There is a public bathing beach on the lake.

== The legend of Hintersteiner See ==
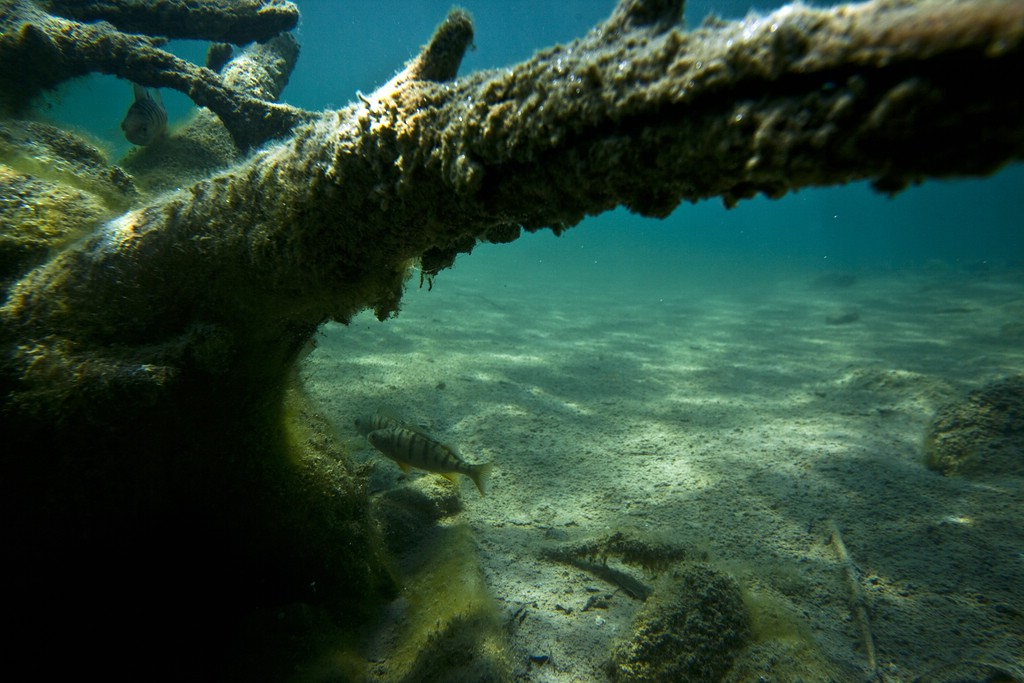
underwater view

In Hinterstein, there lived some high-spirited, wealthy farmers, who used to play bowls with lumps of butter on their luscious meadow, which was where the Hintersteiner See is today. It was a brightly moonlit night as they played once more. Then suddenly, the earth heaved beneath their feet and they sank with their farm and everything on it into the depths. For their wanton behaviour however, the farmers were banished onto the Scheffauer peaks and, to atone for their sins, they were condemned to play bowls as long as the Kaiser mountain exists. Their bowling alley can be found just below the peak of the Scheffauer in a small corrie which is covered with a fine carpet of moss.

According to the legend, the wealthy Hintersteiner farmers had a huge argument about a spring. Even on the solemn festival of Corpus Christi they argued the entire day, which then ended in an unseemly scuffle. Bright and early the very next day, the dairymaid for the farmers, a very proper, sober woman who had long found the argument quite absurd, set off across the meadow to milk the cows and saw a small puddle of water in front of the house, which had never been there before. She shook her head as she saw it, but went on her way. It took her a long time to find the cows and she was surprised to find them huddling together in a dip in the landscape. She milked them quickly so as to get back to the farm and get on with her work, but when she walked up out of the dip, she was confronted with a lake where only the tip of just one house peeked out of the water.
