= Scheffau am Wilden Kaiser =

- Municipality
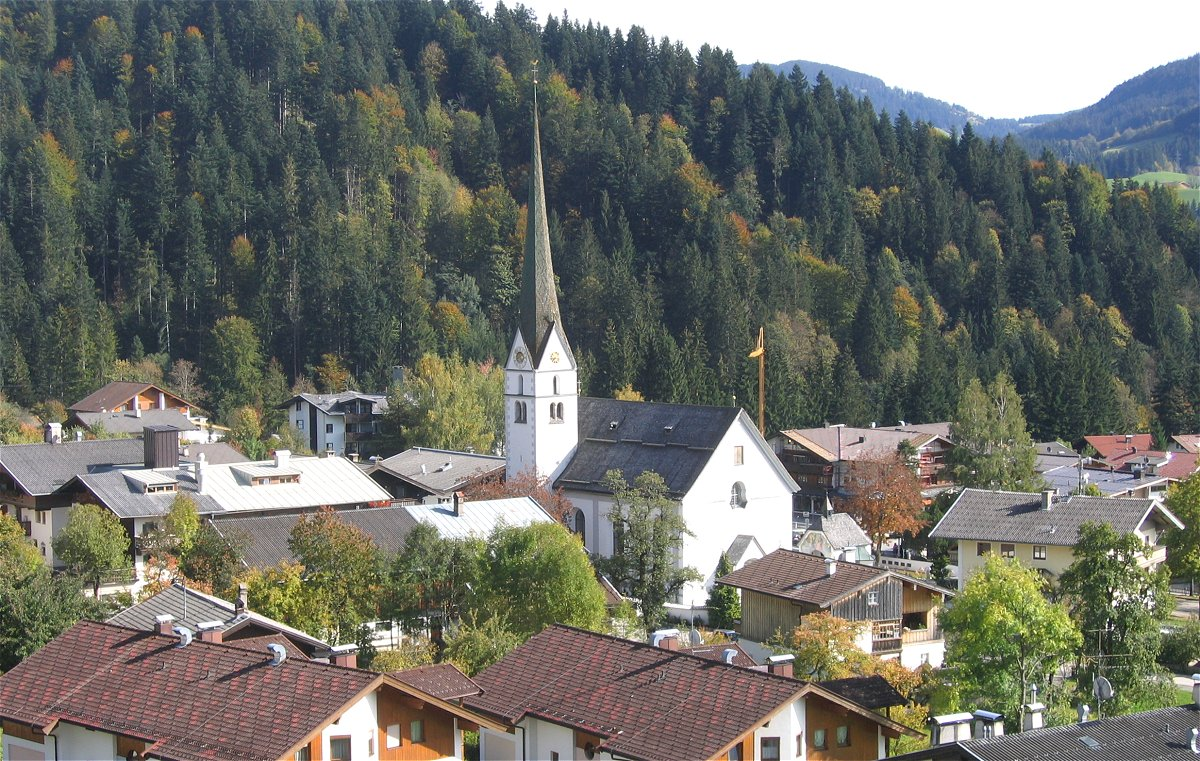
- View of Scheffau

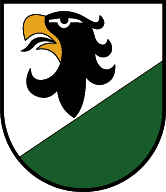
- Coat of arms

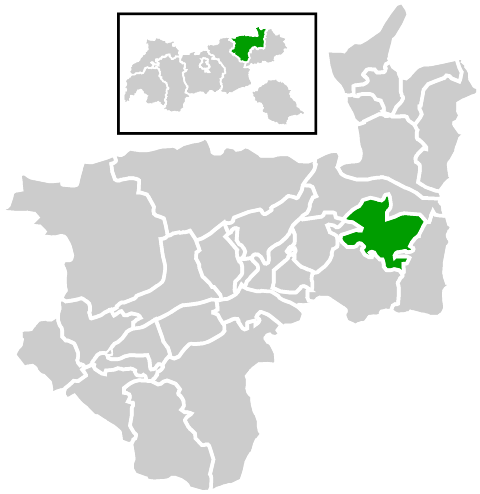
- Location within Kufstein district

- Location within Austria
- Coordinates: 47°31′00″N 12°15′00″E
- Country: Austria
- State: Tyrol
- District: Kufstein

Government
  - Mayor: Rupert Soder

Area
  - Total: 31.45 km^{2} (12.14 sq mi)
- Elevation: 745 m (2,444 ft)

Population (2021)
  - Total: 1,504
  - Density: 47.82/km^{2} (123.9/sq mi)
- Time zone: UTC+1 (CET)
  - Summer (DST): UTC+2 (CEST)
- Postal code: 6351
- Area code: 05358
- Vehicle registration: KU
- Website: gemeinde.scheffau.net

Scheffau am Wilden Kaiser is a municipality in the district Kufstein in the Austrian region of the Sölllandl. It is located 8.50 km southeast of Kufstein and 13 km northwest of Kitzbühel and has three subdivisions. The main source of income is summer tourism. The village has a public swimming area.

Located just outside Scheffau is the Hintersteiner See, the largest lake in the Wilder Kaiser valley.

== Lifts ==
It has connections to the larger 'SkiWelt' ski area. These are an 8-man and a 4-man gondola lift. The Scheffau ski area is in the middle of the SkiWelt.
