= Großache =

River in Germany

Großache also Jochberger Ache and Kitzbüheler Ache (A), and Tiroler Achen (D)
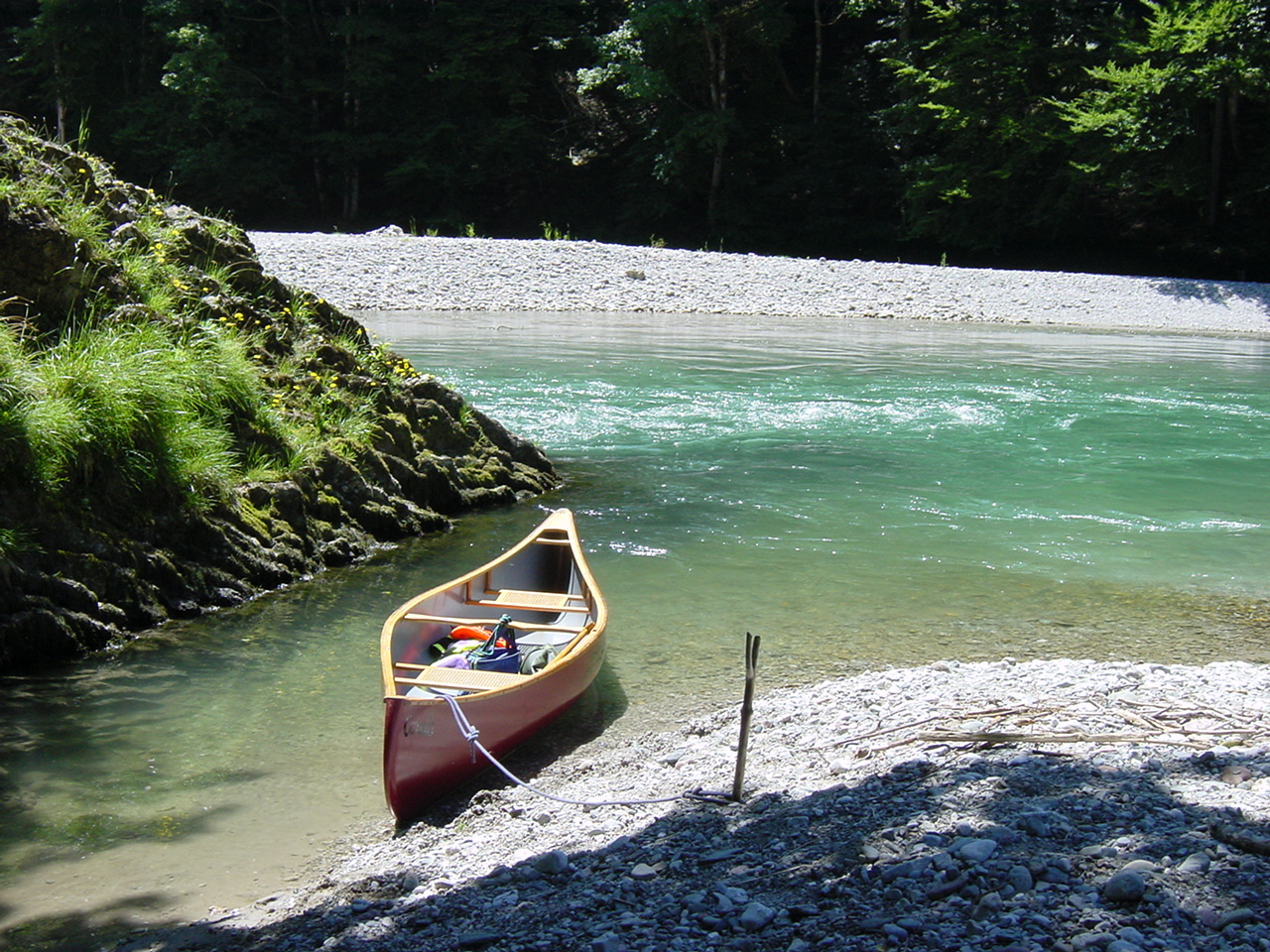
- The Tiroler Achen in the Entenloch Gorge

Location
- Country: Austria and Germany
- Location: Traunstein district, Bavaria; Kitzbühel district, Tyrol
- Reference no.: DE: 184

Physical characteristics
- Source
  - location: Thurn Pass, Pinzgau, Salzburg
  - coordinates: 47°18′33″N 12°24′37″E
  - elevation: 1,270 m (AA)
- Mouth
  - location: Chiemsee
  - coordinates: 47°51′51″N 12°29′59″E
  - elevation: 518 m (AA)
- Length: 79 km (49 mi)
- Basin size: 604 km^{2} (233 sq mi)
- Discharge
  - average: 35.5 m^{3}/s (1,250 cu ft/s)
  - minimum: Average low: 118 m^{3}/s (4,200 cu ft/s) (Staudach gauge)
  - maximum: Average high: 342 m^{3}/s (12,100 cu ft/s)

Basin features
- Progression: Alz→ Inn→ Danube→ Black Sea
- Landmarks: Large towns: Kitzbühel; Small towns: St. Johann in Tirol, Kössen, Marquartstein
- Tributaries
  - left: Reither Ache, Schwarzlofer
  - right: Fieberbrunner Ache, Kohlenbach, Weißenbach from the Walchsee

The Großache is a river, 79 kilometres (49 mi) long, in the east of the Austrian state of Tyrol and the Bavarian region of Chiemgau.

== Names ==
The river is known by four different names, each applying to a different section of its course: above Kitzbühel it is the Jochberger Ache, from Kitzbühel to St. Johann in Tyrol it is known as the Kitzbüheler Ache, in its middle reaches as the Großache, a name also used for the entire Austrian section, and in its lower reaches in Germany as the Tiroler Achen. It rises on the Thurn Pass on the territory of Salzburg state, reaches the Tyrolean border after just 400 metres (1,300 ft) and the German border after 55 kilometres (34 mi), discharging 24 kilometres (15 mi) later near Grabenstätt into the Chiemsee lake.

The Großache is not the only river whose name changes at the border of two countries that share the same language. A variation of its Austrian name is the Große Ache; the Bavarian section is also called the Tiroler Ache. The term Achen is not a plural form, but a peculiarity of the Bavarian dialect. The name Kössener Ache is also used.

== Sources ==
In many publications, even the more serious ones, the length of the Austrian section of the river is often erroneously given as 48 km (30 mi). On many maps, the start of the river in Salzburg provinces is missing. On the official Austrian 1:200,000 scale map, the highest part of the river is shown as the Trattenbach, which is longer and also delivers greater quantities of water than the nominal headstream of the river.

== Course ==
The nominal source of the Jochberger Ache lies at 1,270 m (4,170 ft) above sea level on the Thurn Pass. A few of its early tributaries are, however, larger and have a greater discharge. The most important is the Trattenbach which starts as a trickle from a high cirque at about 1,900 m (6,200 ft) above sea level between the mountains of the Zweitausender and the Rossgruberkogel south of the Kleiner Rettenstein, and is fed by several other springs before it joins the Jochberger Ache.

The valleys of the Jochberger Ache and Kitzbüheler Ache are surrounded by the Kitzbühel Alps. The peaks at the end of the side valleys have heights of up to 2,363 m (7,753 ft) above sea level (the Geißstein), around Kitzbühel they are lower than 2,000 m (6,600 ft). The Großache forms the eastern boundary of the Kaiser Mountains. Shortly after St. Johann, still in the valley of Leukental, lie the villages of Kirchdorf in Tirol and Erpfendorf. Between Kössen, which lies in an east-west valley opening onto the Inn trench and also known as Kaiserwinkl, and the Bavarian valley near Schleching, the river pierces the Chiemgau Alps in a narrow gorge, the Entenloch. Near Grassau the Tiroler Achen reaches the Alpine Foreland.

The Tiroler Achen finally discharges into the Chiemsee lake and, thence via the river Alz, belongs to the right-hand river system of the Inn, and the Danube, whose waters eventually reach the Black Sea. Its main tributaries, apart from its headstreams, are the Kitzbühler, Fieberbrunner and Reither Ache, shortly before Kössen, the Schwarzlofer from Reit im Winkl, and in Kössen the Kohlenbach and Weißenbach from the lake of Walchsee.

== Water works and conservation ==
Increasing settlement in the Leuken and Achen valleys, the lower valleys of the Ache, since the 1960s led to heavy pollution of the Tiroler Achen, and hence the Chiemsee, with sewage. In the 1970s, its water quality was assessed as 'critical'. Only by providing the settlements along the river with proper sewage systems and building modern sewage farms, e.g. in Kössen and Grassau (Achen Valley Sewage Works), could pollution of the river be significantly reduced.

The area of the river delta where it discharges into the Chiemsee is designated as a nature reserve.

From 1996-2001 the Großache was renaturalised in the area of Kirchdorf in Tirol as part of the Kirchdorf flood protection project. This was achieved by deepening the river bed and widening the banks to produce greater drainage volume. In order to guarantee 100-year flood-event safety, the river bed was lowered by 1.8 m (5 ft 11 in) over a distance of 6.5 km (4.0 mi), and the cross-section widened to an average of 60–100 m (200–330 ft). In the flood plain a 20 ha (49 acres) area was set aside for flood retention. In addition to flood protection, this innovative strategy has along brought additional benefits in the shape of nature conservation and human recreation.
