= Kirchensur =

- Village of Amerang
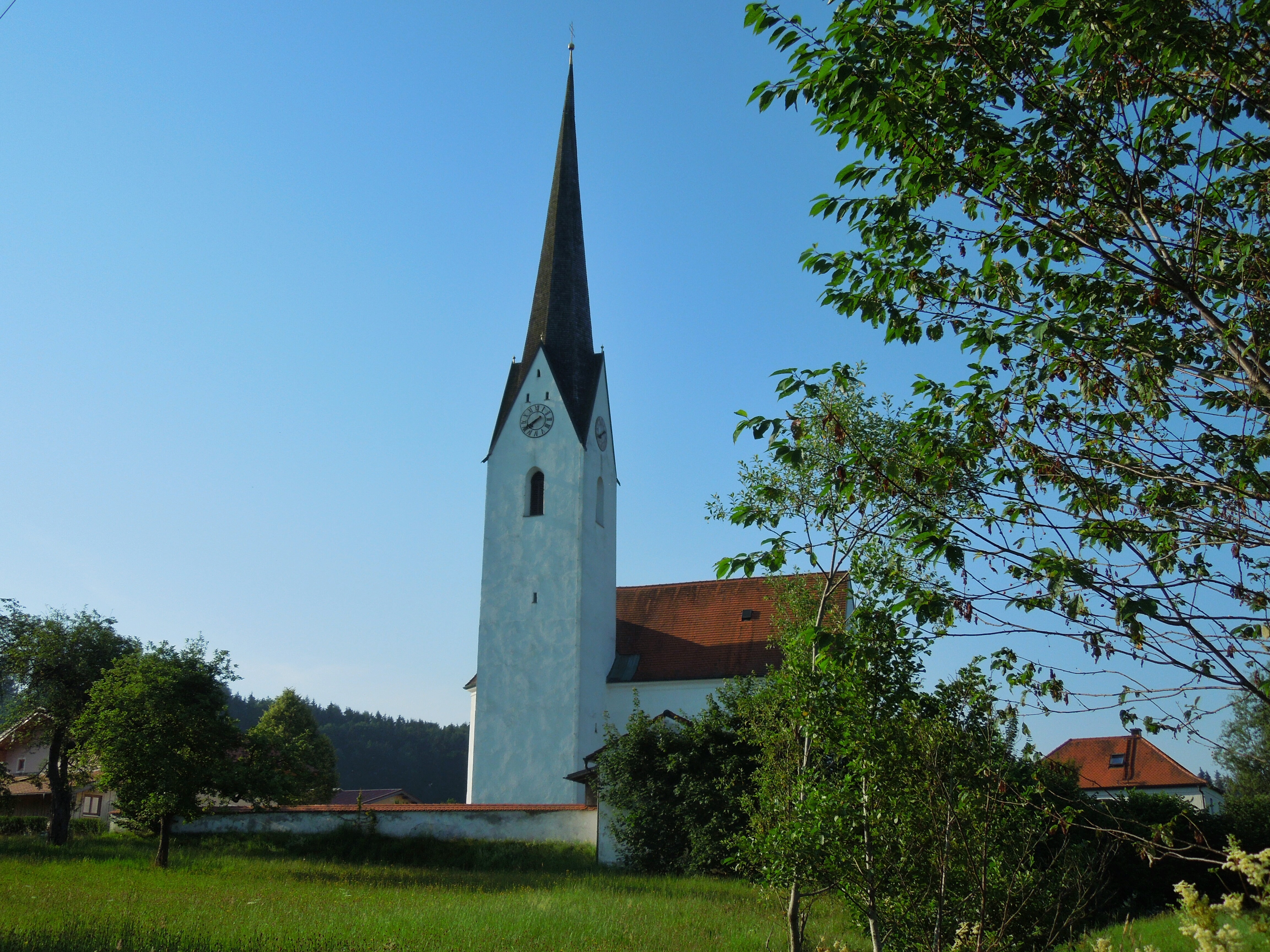
- The church of Kirchensur
- Interactive map of Kirchensur
- Location within Germany Location within Bavaria
- Coordinates: 48°2′27.251″N 12°20′16.522″E
- Country: Germany
- State: Bavaria
- Admin. region: Oberbayern
- District: Rosenheim
- Municipality: Amerang
- Elevation: 530 m (1,740 ft)
- Time zone: UTC+01:00 (CET)
  - Summer (DST): UTC+02:00 (CEST)
- Postal codes: 83123
- Vehicle registration: RO
- Website: www.kirchensur.de

Kirchensur is a village in the municipality of Amerang in the district of Rosenheim in Bavaria, Germany.

== Geography ==
Kirchensur is located in north of the Chiemgau area, named after lake Chiemsee. It lies about six kilometres northeast of Amerang, seven kilometres northwest of Obing, eight and a half kilometres in the west of Wasserburg am Inn and four kilometres southwest of Schnaitsee.

== History ==
Kirchensur was first mentioned in the 10th century as "Sur", which roughly translates to acidic water.

In the 13th century, Kirchensur was an Obmannschaft and, from 1800 up to the consolidating with Amerang in 1970, a separate municipality.

The time of establishment of the church is not confirmed, but it probably existed before the beginning of the 11th century.

In 1876, the village got its own school, which existed until the integration into the school of Eiselfing (1969).

In the 16th century, Kirchensur consisted of about ten buildings, in 1914 of about 15 and nowadays already of 41 buildings (with own house numbers).

== Literature ==
- Konrad Linner: Haus- und Hofgeschichte 1366–2010
