= Entenloch Gorge =

Water gap in Germany

Coordinates: 47°41′21″N 12°23′38″E

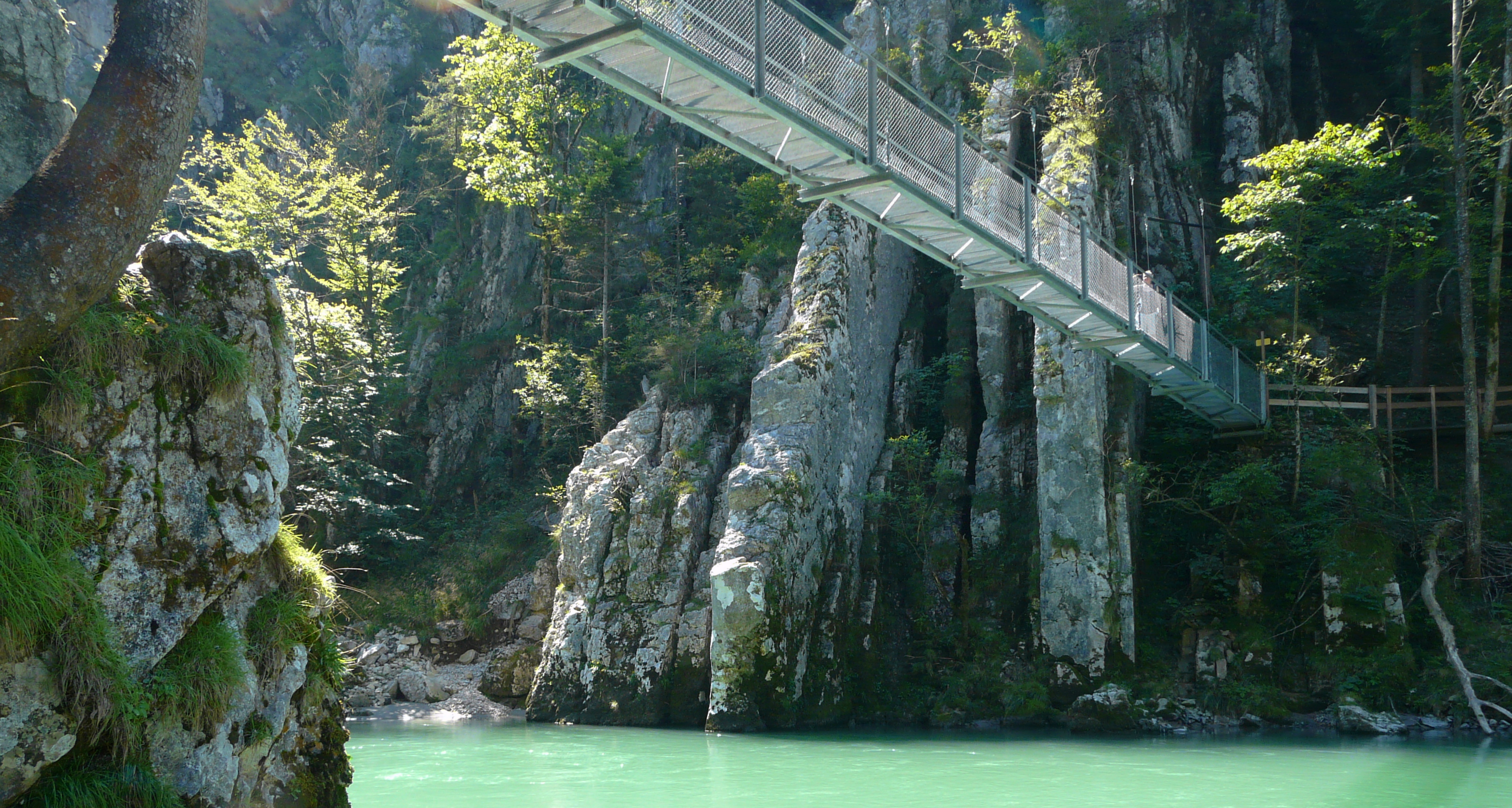
Entenlochklamm hanging bridge

The Entenloch Gorge (German: Entenlochklamm) is a 2.5-km long water gap of the Leukental in the Bavarian-Tyrolian border area between Kössen and Ettenhausen bei Schleching.

Coming from the south, the Großache cuts through a transverse mountain range of steep rocks, reaches the border at the pilgrimage site Maria Klobenstein, and from then on is called the Tiroler Achen.

== Geology ==
The Großache rises on the northern edge of the Kössen valley between the mountains Rudersburg (1434 m) in the west and Rauhe Nadel (1266 m) in the east on several transverse and steeply placed bars of Rhaetian limestone and Jurassic rock. It is the southern border of the Oberwössener depression, which goes from Rauschberg bei Ruhpolding via Kössen to Niederndorf on the Inn. In these resistant layers, the Großache has only been able to create a gorge-like passage since the last ice age. On the Austrian side, the pilgrimage church Maria Klobenstein is located above the gorge in a depression made of weathered layers. A huge rock deposited by a landslide gives the church its name.

One of these ridges forms the natural border between Germany and Austria.

== Widening of the gorge ==
Several extreme floods of the Großache in the area of Kössen and St. Johann in Tirol have occurred since the 16th century. The disaster of 1899 was responsible for the planning of a large flood control project. In 1902, the county of Tyrol commissioned the regulation of the Großache.

Earlier, the Entenloch had a narrower stretch with a width of about 3.4 meters. During heavy rainfall and snowmelt, tree trunks would become wedged in the gorge, causing flooding upstream in the Kössen valley basin. The Großachen regulation from 1906 to 1922 achieved a widening of this area to 12 meters. The blasting for this took place in 1906 and 1907.

== Hanging bridges ==
A hanging bridge over the gorge led to a historical smugglers' path, on which residents of the border area transported cigarettes, alcohol, and coffee in order to avoid customs duty. The bridge was destroyed by driftwood during the 2013 European floods.

A ″Premium Trail″ was built in 2021 as part of the Interreg project ″Sustainable Valuation of the Nature and Cultural Heritage of the Klobenstein Gorge from Bavaria to Tyrol″ with a cost of €900,000. The project received approval on May 6, 2021. As part of this project, a second, 35-meter-long hanging bridge was built over the gorge at a height of 28 meters, along with a new viewing platform as well as many resting spots and new parking places. This development aims to allow more use of the touristic potential of the gorge in a sustainable manner. Walking the loop trail over both hanging bridges and the viewing platform takes about 50 minutes and is somewhat hilly. The ″Smugglers′ Path″ from Kössen to Schleching has a length of 7.5km, and takes about two hours to walk.

== Gallery ==
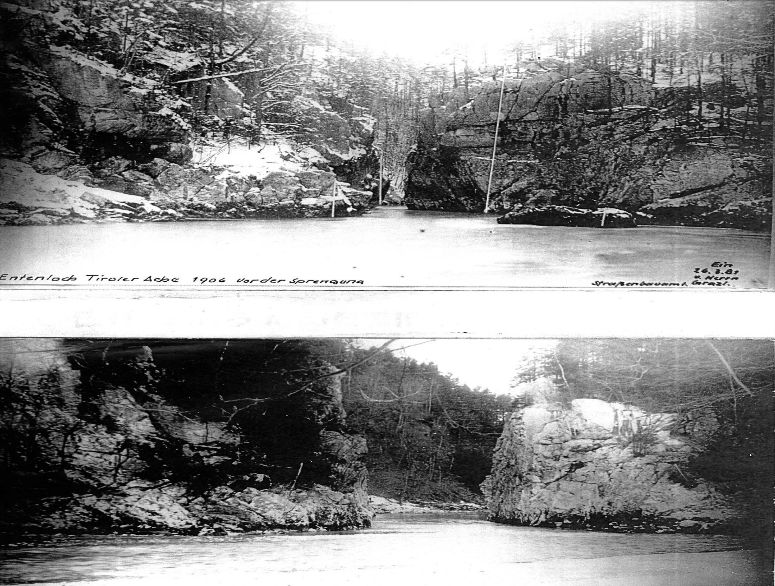
The narrowest part of the gorge before and after it was widened

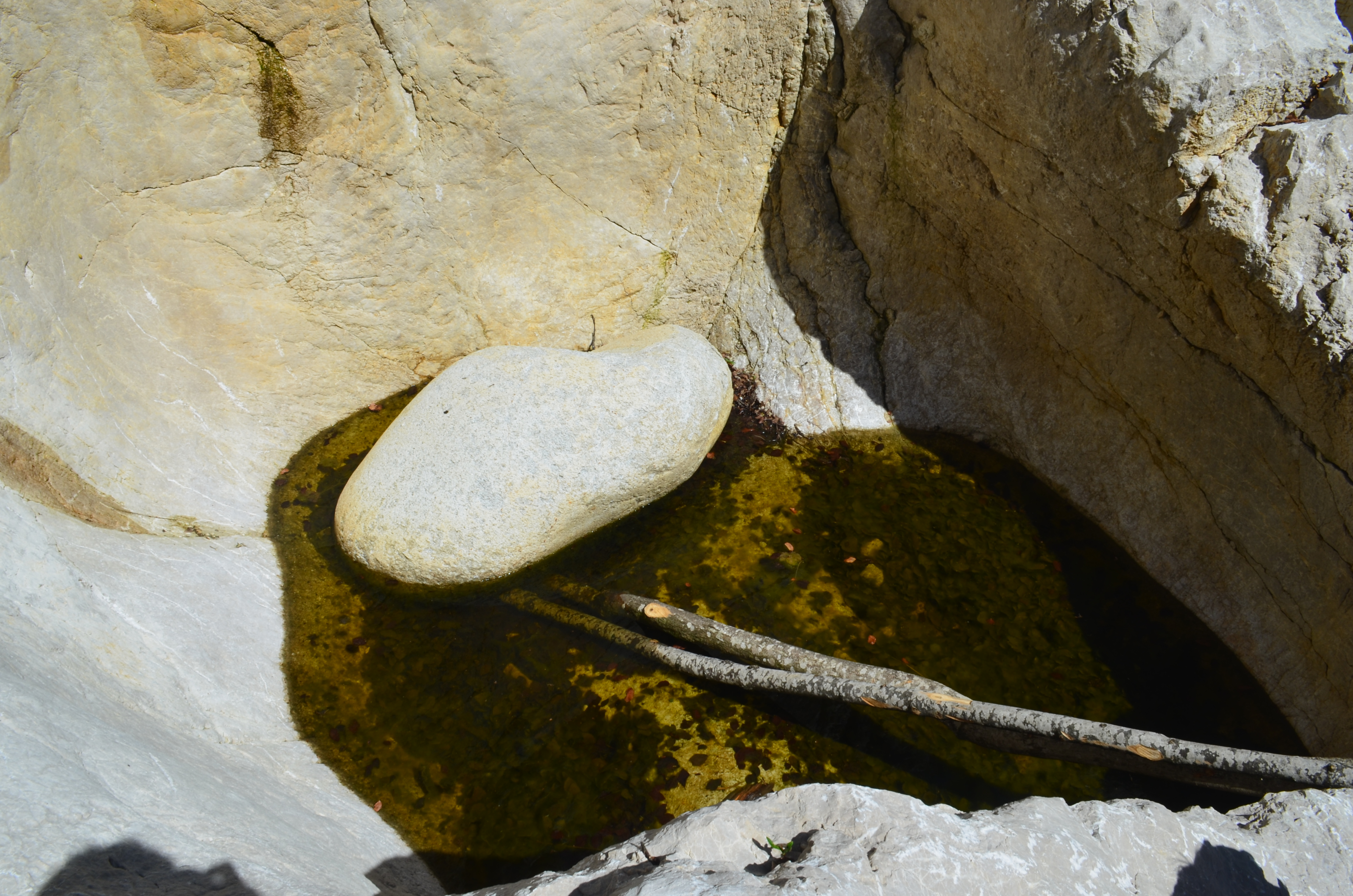
One of the many large pools in the gorge

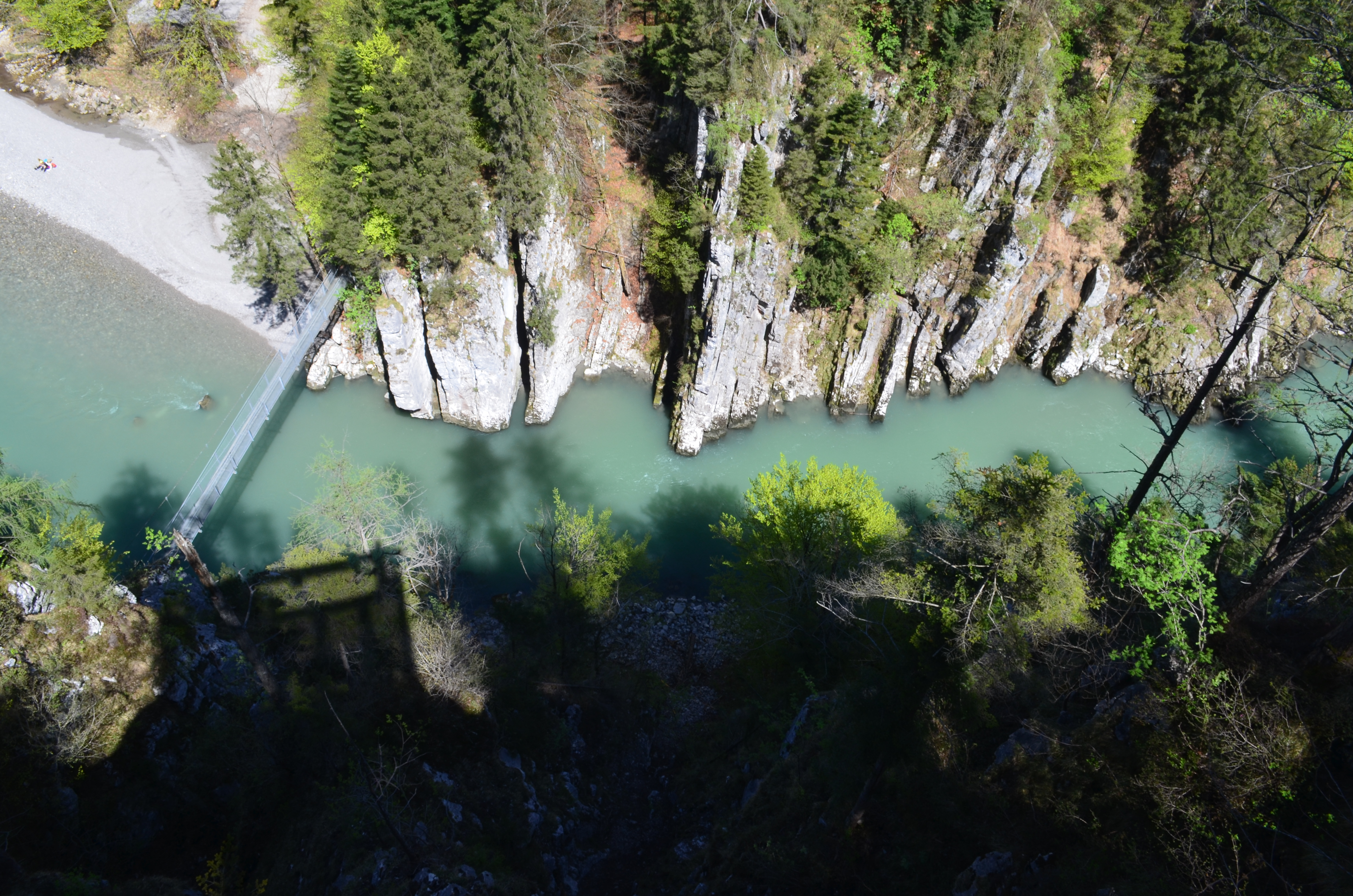
A viewing platform over the Entenloch gorge has a bird's-eye view of the old bridge

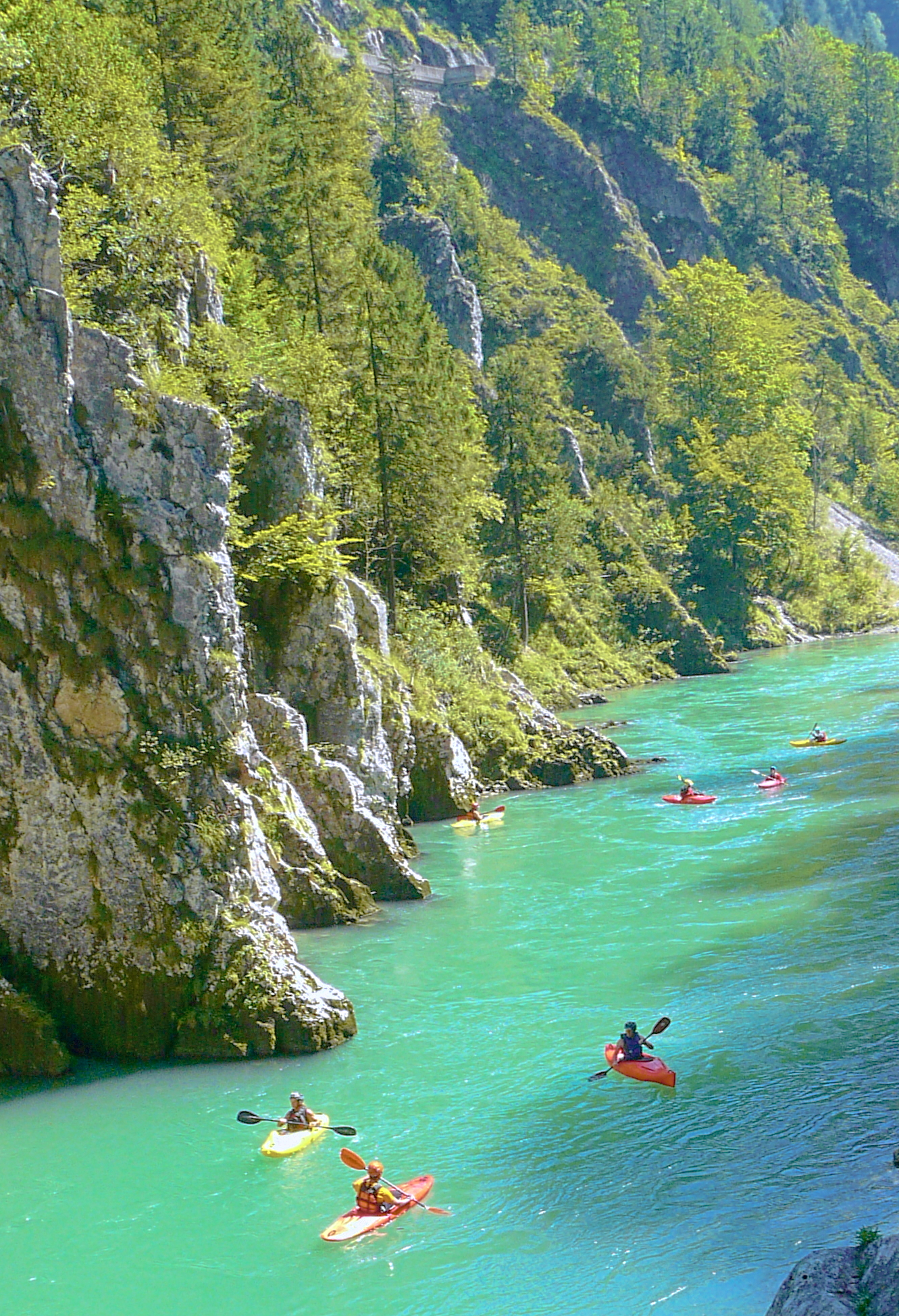
Paddlers in the Entenloch gorge

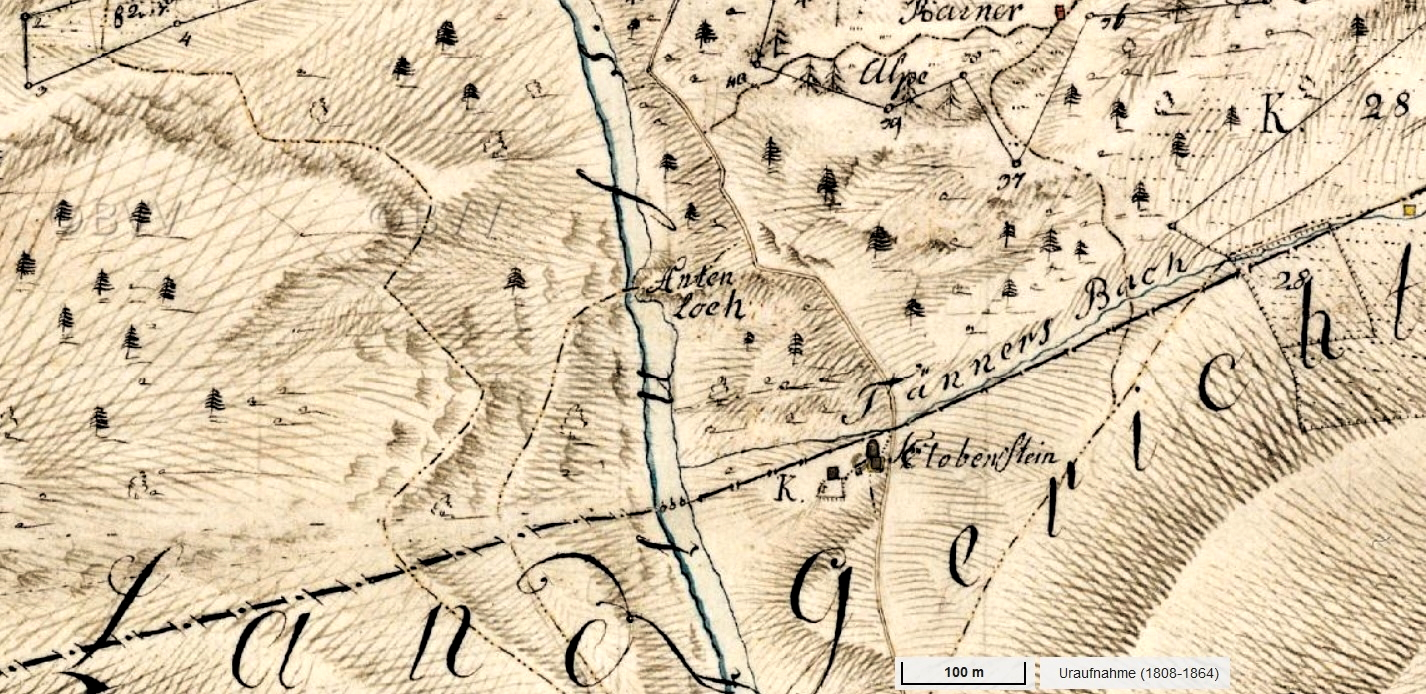
Old map showing original name "Anten Loch"

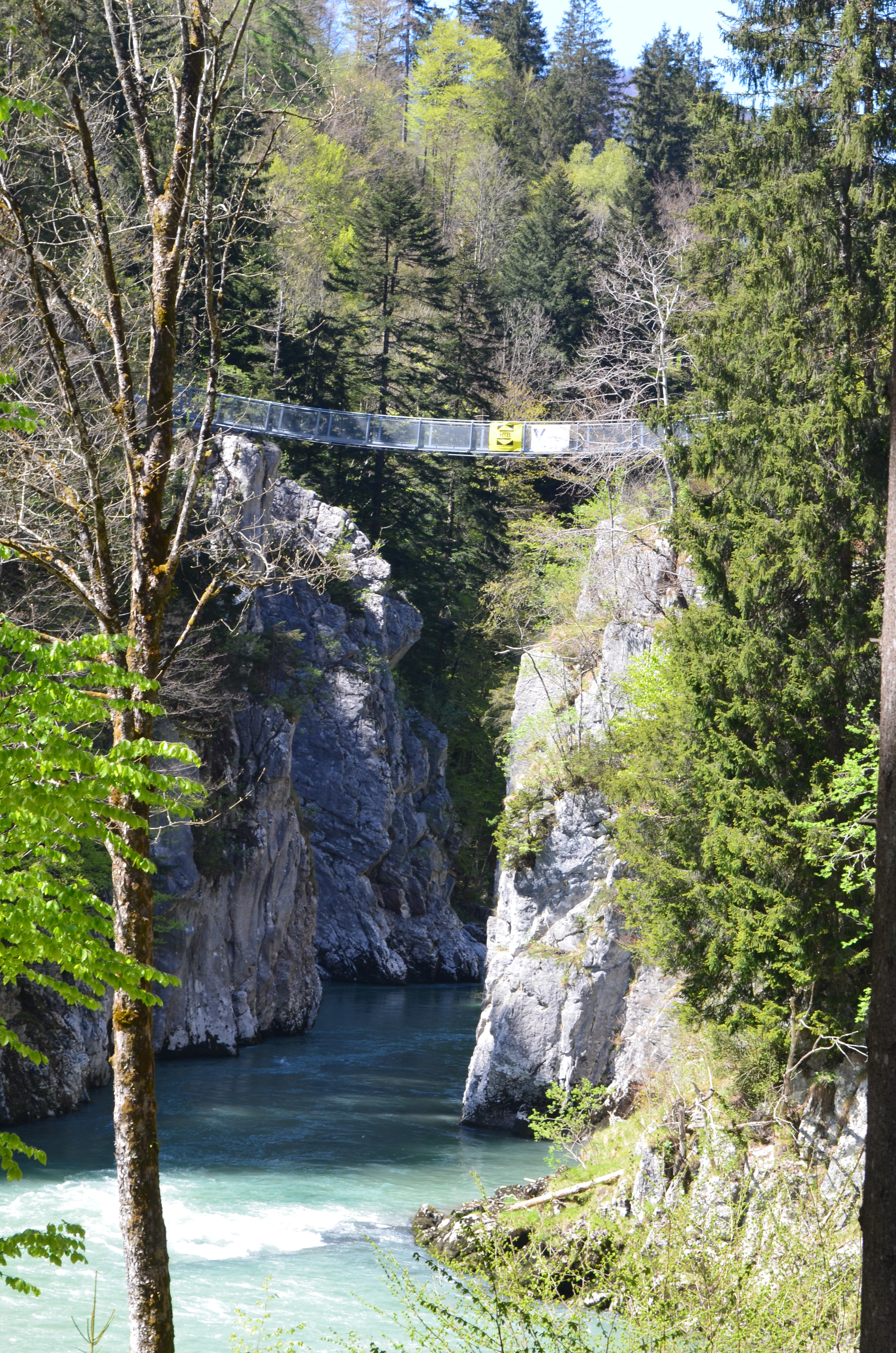
Second bridge over the Entenloch gorge
