= Wolfgang Sawallisch =

German conductor and pianist (1923–2013)

- Born: 26 August 1923; Munich, Bavaria, Germany
- Died: 22 February 2013 (aged 89); Grassau, Bavaria, Germany
- Education: Musikhochschule München
- Occupation: Conductor
- Organizations: Vienna Symphony; Philharmonisches Staatsorchester Hamburg; Orchestre de la Suisse Romande; Bavarian State Opera; Philadelphia Orchestra

Signature
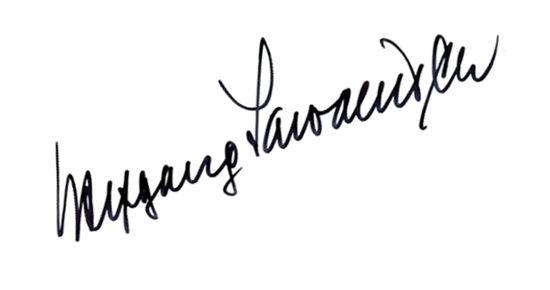

Wolfgang Sawallisch (26 August 1923 – 22 February 2013) was a German conductor and pianist.

== Biography ==
Wolfgang Sawallisch was born in Munich, the son of Maria and Wilhelm Sawallisch. His father was director of the Hamburg-Bremer-Feuerversicherung insurance company in the city. Wolfgang's brother Werner was five years older. He passed his Abitur in 1942 at the Wittelsbacher-Gymnasium in Munich.

At the age of five, he was already playing the piano and by the time he was ten, he had decided he wanted to become a concert pianist. As a child, he was greatly influenced by Richard Strauss and Hans Knappertsbusch. In his musical education he was generously supported by his family, especially by his widowed mother, who became active again because of him, and also by his older brother. At first, he studied composition and piano privately. This enabled him to prepare for his career as a pianist and conductor before and after the Second World War without financial worries. His professional development was interrupted by his military service and captivity: during the war he served in the Wehrmacht, in France and Italy, and in the closing stages of the war was detained at a British POW camp in Italy.

After returning home to Munich, he studied with Joseph Haas and, after one semester, passed his state examination at the Musikhochschule München in 1946. He took conducting lessons with Hans Rosbaud and Igor Markevitch. He found his first job at the Stadttheater Augsburg. During this time he married the singer Mechthild Schmid (1921–1998), daughter of the organ builder Magnus Schmid (1889–1964) from Pemmering, whom he had already met in his youth in Munich. She had a great influence on him throughout their life together.

Through the adoption of her son, born in 1944, from his wife's first marriage, he founded his own family. Mechthild renounced her own career as a singer in favour of her husband's career; on the one hand she suffered from standing in the shadow of the successful man, on the other hand she saw her function as his manager. After 46 years of marriage she died at the age of 77 due to thyroid cancer.

The Wolfgang Sawallisch Foundation was founded in Grassau, in Bavaria in 2003 and comprises a music school. At a benefit concert of the Bavarian State Orchestra in Grassau on 2 February 2013 under the baton of Kent Nagano, Sawallisch was seen in public for the last time. He gave the opera world his last press interview for the January 2013 issue. His son Jörg died in January 2013, just one month before his adoptive father. Sawallisch lived for over 50 years in Grassau in Chiemgau, Upper Bavaria, where he was also buried.

The villa in Grassau, where Wolfgang Sawallisch had lived for decades, was taken over by the Sawallisch Foundation in 2014 and is occasionally used for concerts by the Grassau Music School.

=== Career ===
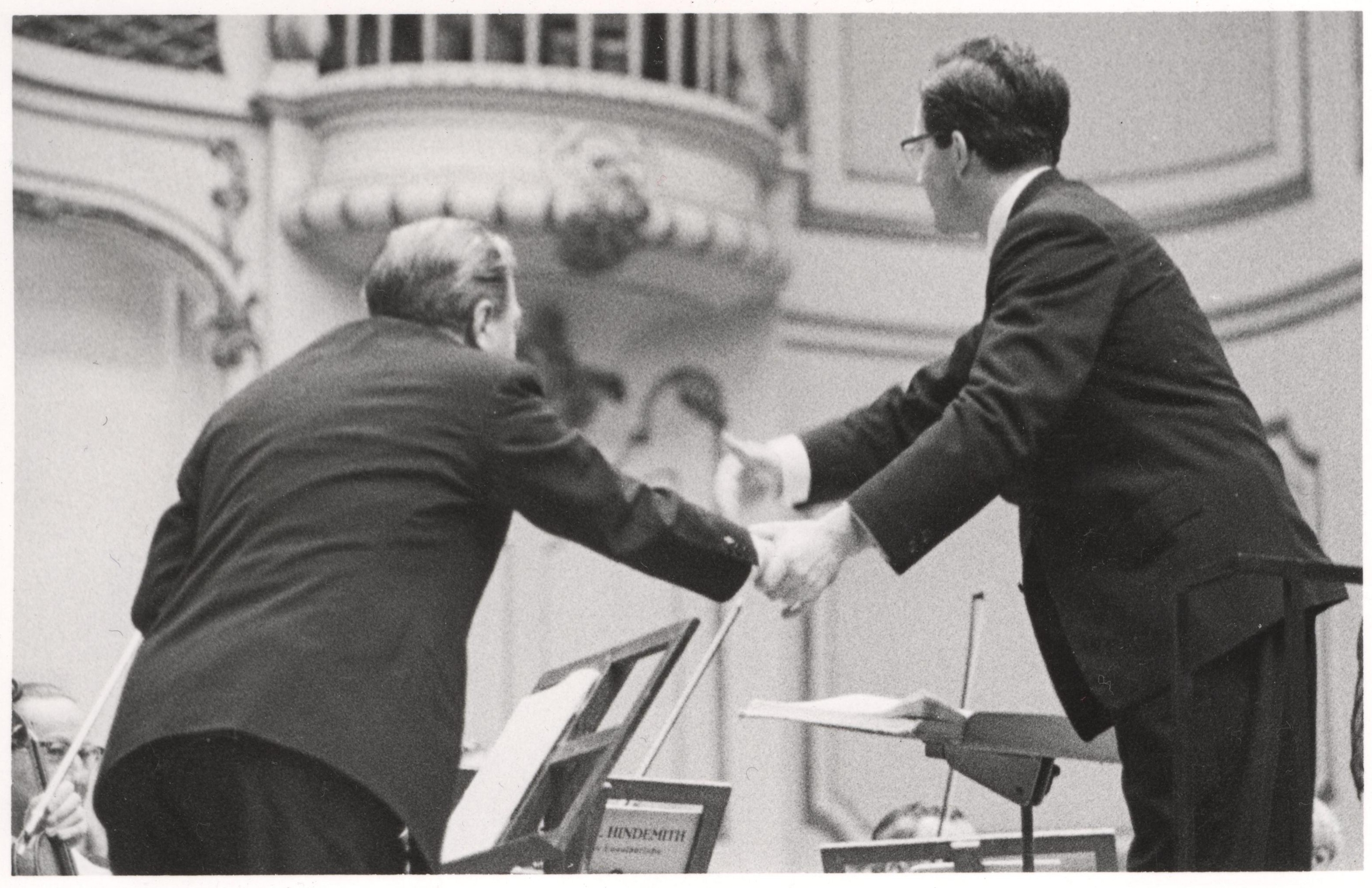
Wolfgang Sawallisch in Hamburg, 1960

He began his career at the opera house in Augsburg in 1947. At first, he held the position of répétiteur and later became the principal conductor. In 1949, he was awarded the first prize at the Geneva International Music Competition where he accompanied the violinist Gerhard Seitz. In 1952–53 he was the personal assistant to Igor Markevitch at the International Summer Academy of the Mozarteum in Salzburg.

He was only 30 when he conducted the Berlin Philharmonic Orchestra, where Herbert Karajan was then the principal conductor. When he debuted at the Bayreuth Festspielhaus conducting Tristan und Isolde in 1957, he was the youngest conductor ever to appear there.

After turning down offers to join the Vienna Philharmonic Orchestra and the Metropolitan Opera in New York City, Sawallisch became principal conductor of the Vienna Symphony in 1960, a post he held for ten years. In 1961, he started conducting the Philharmonisches Staatsorchester Hamburg and did this for ten years as well. From 1970 to 1980, he was music director of the Orchestre de la Suisse Romande.

From 1971 to 1992, he was music director of the Bavarian State Opera, and for several years from 1983, he was concurrently its general manager. For thirty years, he was closely associated with musical events in Munich. Here he conducted practically all of the major Richard Strauss operas, Salome being the sole exception. He also conducted 32 complete cycles of Wagner's Der Ring des Nibelungen, and is credited with nearly 1200 opera performances in the city alone.

In 1966, Eugene Ormandy, the music director of the Philadelphia Orchestra from 1936 to 1980, had invited Sawallisch to visit him. Sawallisch subsequently made several recordings there, and in 1993 succeeded Riccardo Muti as music director of the Philadelphia Orchestra, where he remained until 2003. From 2003 until his death in 2013, he held the title of conductor laureate with the orchestra. He was also honorary conductor laureate of the NHK Symphony Orchestra, Tokyo and for over 30 years he appeared with the orchestra annually in Tokyo. He was the recipient of a Suntory Music Award in 1993.

=== Later life ===
After his tenure with the Philadelphia Orchestra, Sawallisch returned for guest-conducting appearances in Philadelphia and at Carnegie Hall. However, ill health related to orthostatic hypotension prevented Sawallisch from conducting in subsequent years. In an article in The Philadelphia Inquirer of 27 August 2006, Sawallisch himself stated his retirement from the concert podium:

It can happen without announcement that my blood pressure is too low. This instability gives me the necessity to finish my career after 57 years of concert and opera conducting.

Earlier, in 1988, he had published his autobiography "Im Interesse der Deutlichkeit" (For the Sake of Clarity) in which he had expounded his views on the role of a conductor.

=== Affiliations ===
Sawallisch was an honorary member of The Robert Schumann Society. In 2003, he helped to establish a music school in Bavaria, naming the school the Wolfgang Sawallisch Stiftung (Wolfgang Sawallisch Foundation). He himself continued to live on his estate in Grassau in retirement.

=== Personal life ===
Sawallisch and his wife Mechthild were married for 46 years until her death on 24 December 1998. Cardinal Joseph Ratzinger (later Pope Benedict XVI), a family friend, officiated at her Requiem Mass. She had a son, Jörg, from her previous marriage, whom Sawallisch had adopted. Jörg died in January 2013.

Sawallisch died at his home in Grassau on 22 February 2013, aged 89.

== Prominent interpretations ==
Sawallisch has been acclaimed as an interpreter of the music of Richard Strauss. As a pianist, he accompanied a number of prominent singers in lieder, including Dietrich Fischer-Dieskau, Dame Elisabeth Schwarzkopf and Dame Margaret Price. He has also been acclaimed for his interpretations of the symphonies of Robert Schumann and Anton Bruckner.

Sawallisch also recorded, as piano accompanist, Franz Schubert's Winterreise and Robert Schumann's Liederkreis and other songs with Thomas Hampson. One of his most celebrated live concert appearances as a pianist was on 11 February 1994 in Philadelphia, when Sawallisch substituted for the Philadelphia Orchestra at an all-Wagner concert on the night that a severe snow storm prevented much of the orchestra from arriving at the Academy of Music.

== Recording highlights ==
Sawallisch's recordings for EMI include highly regarded issues of Richard Strauss's Capriccio and the four symphonies of Robert Schumann with the Staatskapelle Dresden.

He made a quadraphonic stereo album (probably the only one ever made) of Mozart's The Magic Flute in 1973 for EMI, starring Peter Schreier as Tamino, Anneliese Rothenberger as Pamina, Walter Berry as Papageno, Edda Moser as the Queen of the Night, and Kurt Moll as Sarastro. The Queen of the Night aria from this recording was selected by NASA in 1977 to be included on the Voyager Golden Record, a gold-plated copper record that was sent into space on the Voyager twin space crafts. The record contained sounds and images which had been chosen as examples of the diversity of life and culture on Earth.

Other recordings by Sawallisch (EMI, Orfeo, Philips, and Sony) include:

- Ludwig van Beethoven's nine Symphonies with the Royal Concertgebouw Orchestra, Amsterdam
- Johannes Brahms's Ein deutsches Requiem with the Bavarian Radio Symphony Orchestra and Chorus
- Johannes Brahms's four Symphonies with the London Philharmonic Orchestra
- Johannes Brahms's four Symphonies with the Wiener Symphoniker
- Anton Bruckner's Symphonies 1, 4, 5, 6 & 9
- Antonín Dvořák's Requiem, and Stabat Mater, both with the Czech Philharmonic
- Antonín Dvořák's Symphonies Nos. 7–9 and Cello Concerto with the Philadelphia Orchestra
- Felix Mendelssohn's Symphony No. 2 with the Berlin Philharmonic and Düsseldorf Chorus
- Wolfgang Amadeus Mozart's The Magic Flute with Francisco Araiza, Lucia Popp and Kurt Moll (videoregistration)
- Franz Schubert's nine Symphonies with the Staatskapelle Dresden; Sacred Choral Works with the Bavarian Radio Symphony Orchestra and Chorus
- Franz Schubert's Masses in A flat major D 678, C major D 452 and in E flat major D 950 as well as Tantum Ergo D 962 and Offertorium D 963 with the Bavarian Radio Symphony Orchestra and Chorus
- Leopold Stokowski Orchestral Transcriptions with The Philadelphia Orchestra
- Richard Strauss's Intermezzo, Elektra, Friedenstag, Die Frau ohne Schatten, and Arabella with the Bavarian State Opera
- Richard Strauss's Ein Heldenleben, Symphonia domestica, and Also sprach Zarathustra with The Philadelphia Orchestra
- Richard Strauss's Horn Concertos, with Dennis Brain and the Philharmonia Orchestra
- Giuseppe Verdi's Macbeth (live recording, Salzburg Festival)
- Richard Wagner's Der Ring des Nibelungen, Die Meistersinger von Nürnberg, Die Feen and Das Liebesverbot with the Bavarian State Opera; Der fliegende Holländer (Bayreuth Festival and Bavarian State Orchestra, the latter filmed) and Tristan und Isolde, Tannhäuser and Lohengrin (all Bayreuth Festival, the latter two officially released)
- Richard Wagner's Wesendonck Lieder with Marjana Lipovsek and The Philadelphia Orchestra
- Carl Maria von Weber's Overtures with the Philharmonia Orchestra
- Carl Maria von Weber's two Symphonies with the Symphony Orchestra of the Bavarian Radio

His final concerts and recording project in Philadelphia were focused on the music of Robert Schumann and was released on The Philadelphia Orchestra's own recording label in 2003.
