= Petting (disambiguation) =

Petting refers to making out. Petting may also refer to:

- Petting of animals, a form of interaction
- Petting, Bavaria
