= Theatergemeinschaft Amerang =

Theatergemeinschaft Amerang is a theatre company based in Amerang, Bavaria, Germany.
