= Grub (Amerang) =

- Quarter of Amerang
- Interactive map of Grub
- Location within Germany Location within Bavaria
- Coordinates: 48°2′40″N 12°20′49″E
- Country: Germany
- State: Bavaria
- Admin. region: Oberbayern
- District: Rosenheim
- Municipality: Amerang
- Elevation: 571 m (1,873 ft)
- Time zone: UTC+01:00 (CET)
  - Summer (DST): UTC+02:00 (CEST)
- Postal codes: 83123
- Vehicle registration: RO

Grub is a hamlet is the municipality of Amerang in Bavaria, Germany.

== History ==
Grub was first mentioned in 1467. The housing stock in 1857 consisted of residential building, horse and cow stable, barn, granary and oven. In 1871 the cowshed was rebuilt and in 1865 a bakehouse and a laundry were added.

== Literature ==
- „Haus- und Hofgeschichte 1366-2010“ von Konrad Linner
