= Thurn Pass =

Mountain pass in western Austria

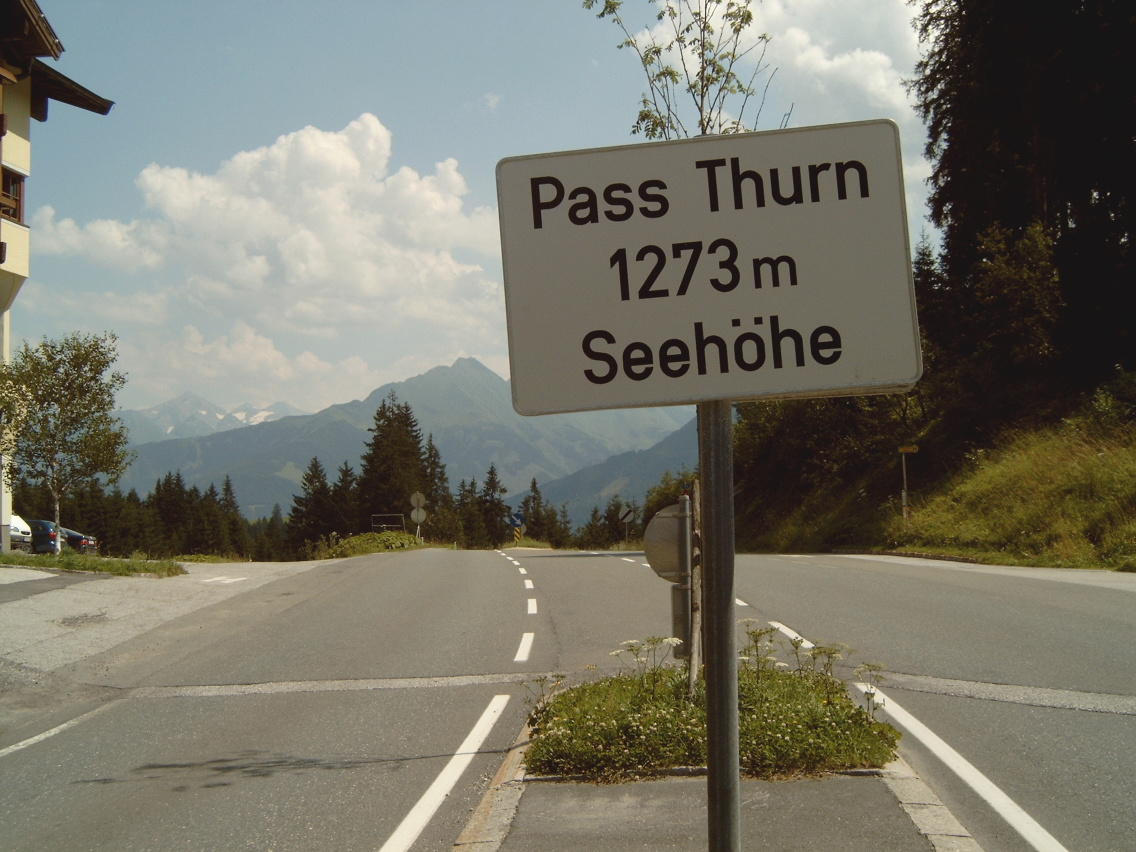
- Summit of the pass

- Location within Alps Location within Austria
- Elevation: 1,274 metres (4,180 ft)

Third Approach
- Location: Austria
- Range: Alps
- Coordinates: 47°18′30″N 12°24′32″E

Ramsar Wetland
- Official name: Mires of Pass Thurn
- Designated: 2 February 2004
- Reference no.: 1367

Thurn Pass (el. 1,274 metres [4,180 ft]) is a high mountain pass in Austria, in the Kitzbühel Alps. It connects Kitzbühel in Tyrol with Mittersill in Salzburg.

The Jochberger Ache has its source near the pass. A series of peatland mires in the pass have been designated as a protected Ramsar site since 2004.

== Lifts ==
There are several chairlifts and T-bar lifts at the pass. A gondola lift connecting Hollersbach im Pinzgau with the ski resort of the Thurn Pass opened in December 2005. In 2005 The Gondola connected The Hollersbach area to the Kitzbühel ski area. Again in summer 2011, The Resterhöhe double chairlift and Moseralm T-bar were replaced with a new modern six-person detachable chairlift with weather bubble and seat heating. These lift improvements are part of a large lift improvement plan that started back in 2004. Since then, fifteen new gondolas and chairlifts have replaced older ones across the ski-resort.

== See also ==
- List of highest paved roads in Europe
- List of mountain passes
