= Obing (Verwaltungsgemeinschaft) =

- Verwaltungsgemeinschaft
- Location of Obing within Traunstein district
- Interactive map of Obing
- Location within Germany Location within Bavaria
- Coordinates: 48°00′N 12°24′E
- Country: Germany
- State: Bavaria
- Admin. region: Upper Bavaria
- District: Traunstein
- Seat: Obing
- Subdivisions: 3 municipalities

Area
  - Total: 94.49 km^{2} (36.48 sq mi)

Population (2025-12-31)
  - Total: 7,686
  - Density: 81.34/km^{2} (210.7/sq mi)
- Time zone: UTC+01:00 (CET)
  - Summer (DST): UTC+02:00 (CEST)
- Website: www.vg-obing.de

Obing is a Verwaltungsgemeinschaft (municipal association) in the district of Traunstein in Bavaria, Germany. Its seat is in Obing.

It consists of the following municipalities:

1. Kienberg
2. Obing
3. Pittenhart
