= Fridolfing =

- Municipality
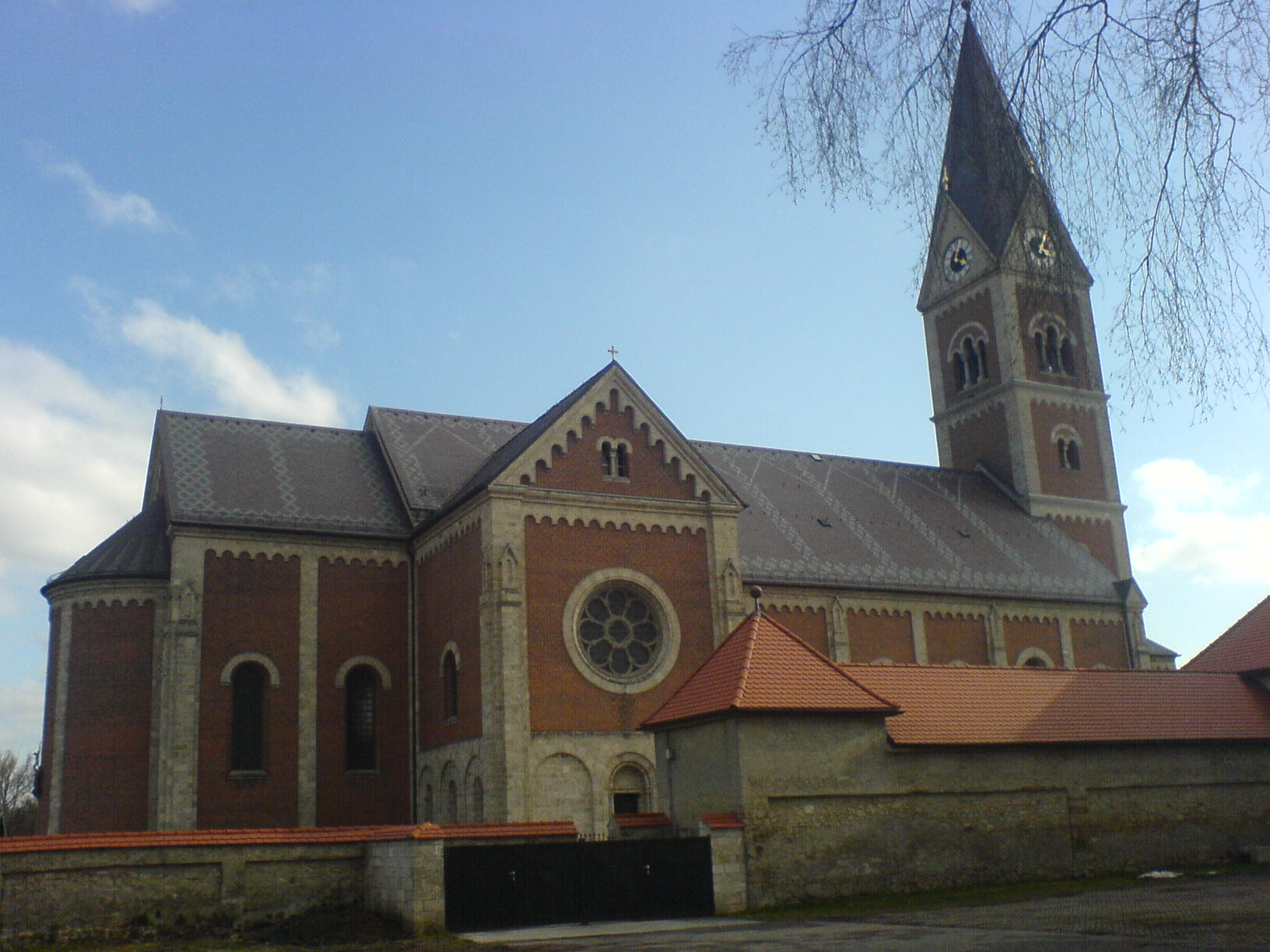
- Assumption of the Virgin Mary Church

- Coat of arms

- Location of Fridolfing within Traunstein district
- Interactive map of Fridolfing
- Location within Germany Location within Bavaria
- Coordinates: 48°0′N 12°49′E
- Country: Germany
- State: Bavaria
- Admin. region: Oberbayern
- District: Traunstein

Government
  - Mayor (2020–26): Johann Schild (SPD)

Area
  - Total: 44.22 km^{2} (17.07 sq mi)
- Elevation: 388 m (1,273 ft)

Population (2025-12-31)
  - Total: 4,313
  - Density: 97.54/km^{2} (252.6/sq mi)
- Time zone: UTC+01:00 (CET)
  - Summer (DST): UTC+02:00 (CEST)
- Postal codes: 83413
- Dialling codes: 08684
- Vehicle registration: TS
- Website: www.fridolfing.de

Fridolfing (German pronunciation: [ˈfʁiːdɔlfɪŋ]) is a municipality in the district of Traunstein in Bavaria, Germany.

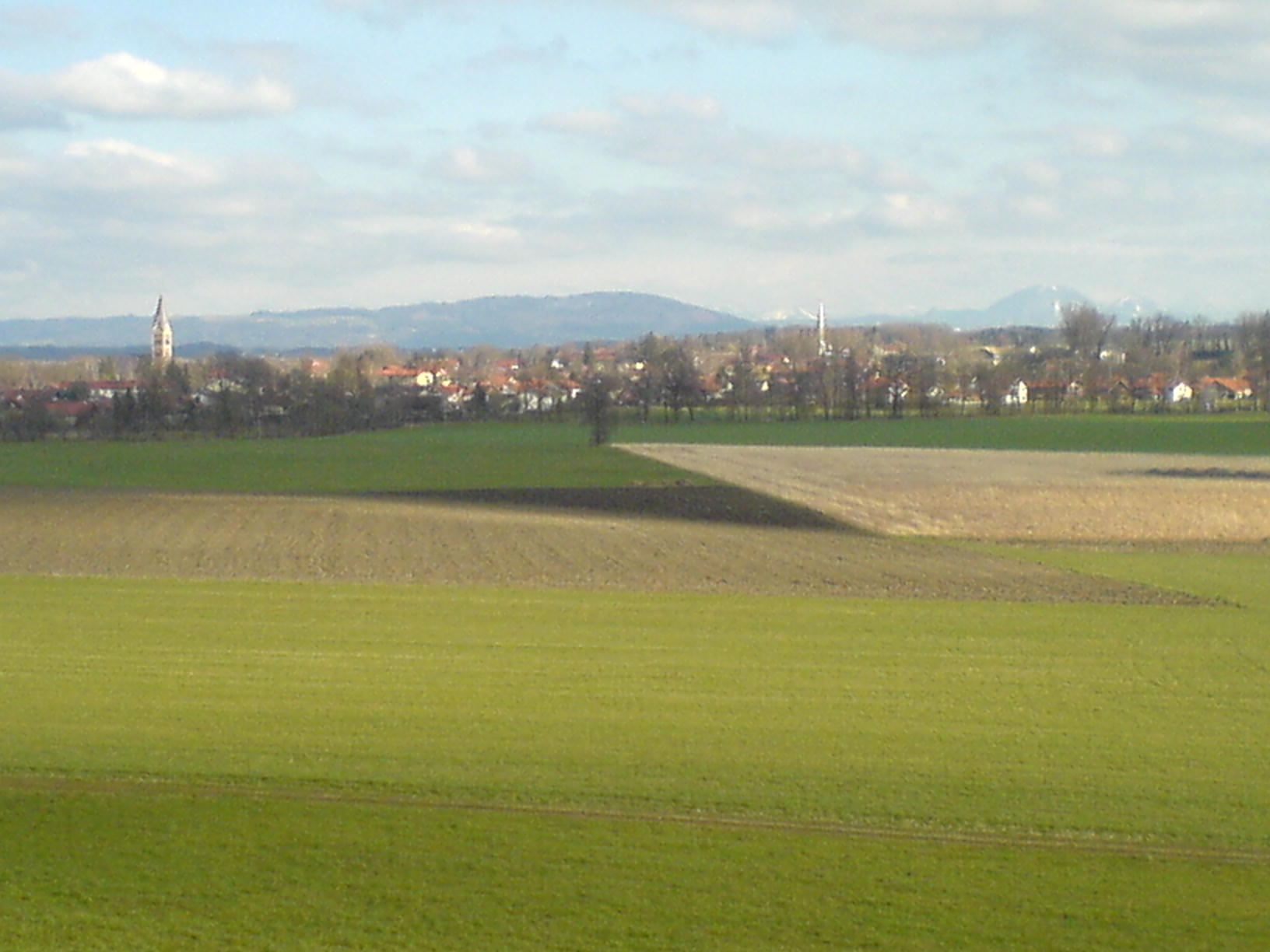
Panorama
