= Engelsberg =

- Municipality
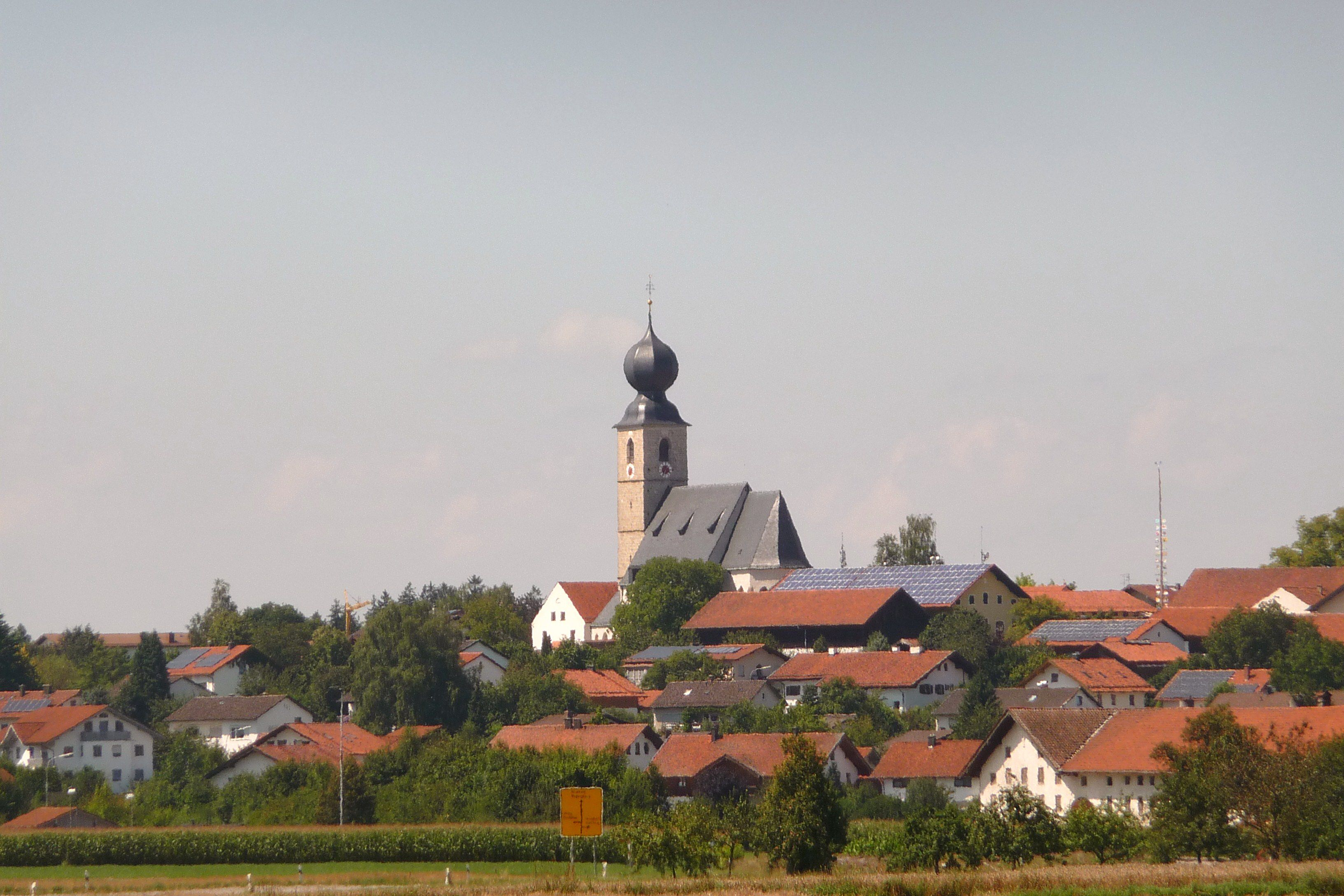
- Parish church of Saint Andreas

- Coat of arms

- Location of Engelsberg within Traunstein district
- Interactive map of Engelsberg
- Location within Germany Location within Bavaria
- Coordinates: 48°07′N 12°33′E
- Country: Germany
- State: Bavaria
- Admin. region: Oberbayern
- District: Traunstein

Government
  - Mayor (2020–26): Martin Lackner

Area
  - Total: 34.18 km^{2} (13.20 sq mi)
- Elevation: 517 m (1,696 ft)

Population (2025-12-31)
  - Total: 2,506
  - Density: 73.32/km^{2} (189.9/sq mi)
- Time zone: UTC+01:00 (CET)
  - Summer (DST): UTC+02:00 (CEST)
- Postal codes: 84549
- Dialling codes: 08634
- Vehicle registration: TS
- Website: www.engelsberg-info.de

Engelsberg (German pronunciation: [ˈɛŋl̩sbɛʁk]) is a municipality in the district of Traunstein in Bavaria in Germany.
