= Kienberg, Bavaria =

Kienberg
- Municipality
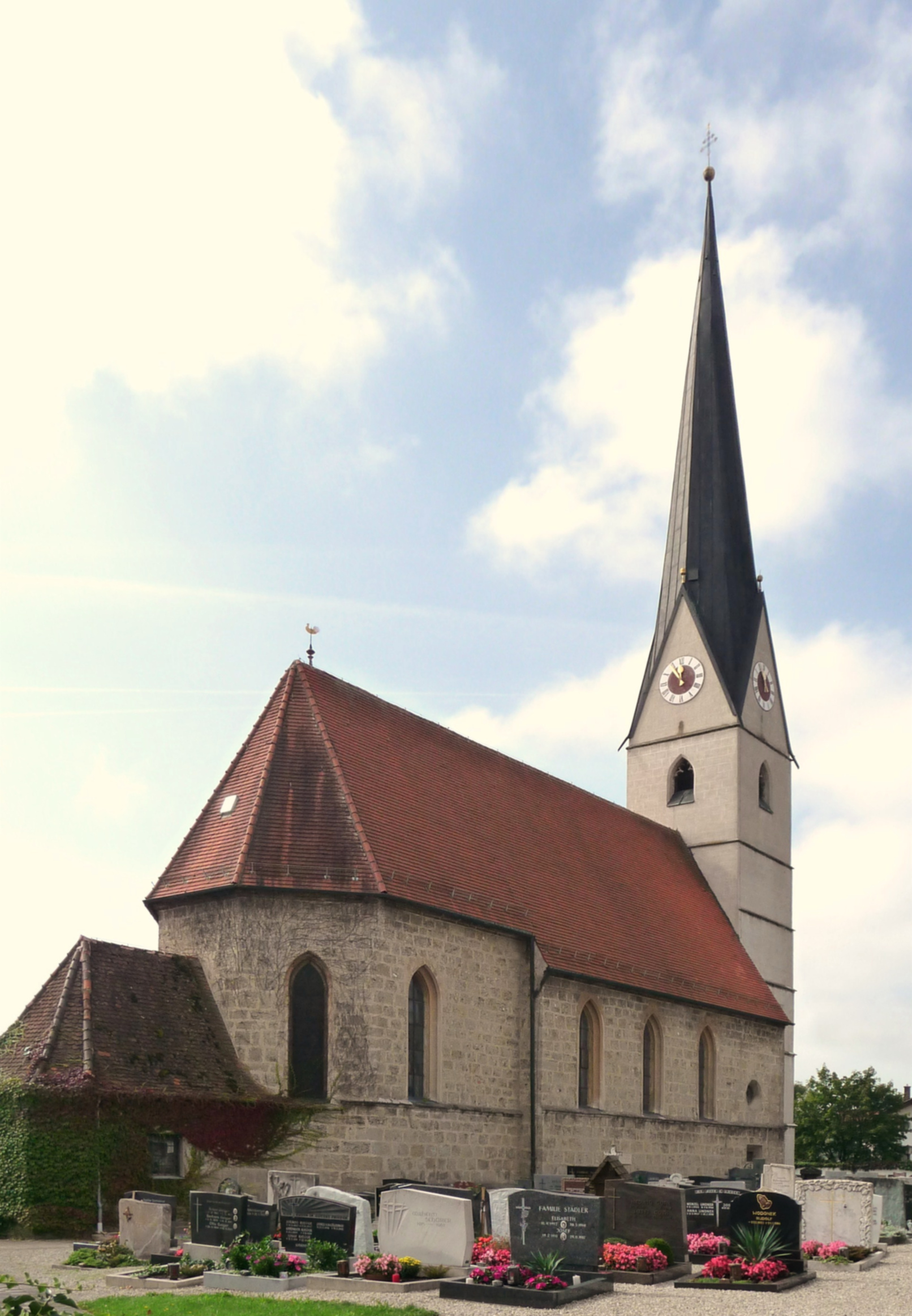
- Church of Saint Martin

- Coat of arms

- Location of Kienberg within Traunstein district
- Interactive map of Kienberg
- Location within Germany Location within Bavaria
- Coordinates: 48°02′N 12°28′E
- Country: Germany
- State: Bavaria
- Admin. region: Oberbayern
- District: Traunstein
- Municipal assoc.: Obing

Government
  - Mayor (2020–26): Hans Schmidhuber (CSU)

Area
  - Total: 22.83 km^{2} (8.81 sq mi)
- Elevation: 558 m (1,831 ft)

Population (2025-12-31)
  - Total: 1,378
  - Density: 60.36/km^{2} (156.3/sq mi)
- Time zone: UTC+01:00 (CET)
  - Summer (DST): UTC+02:00 (CEST)
- Postal codes: 83361
- Dialling codes: 08628
- Vehicle registration: TS
- Website: www.kienberg.eu

Kienberg (German pronunciation: [ˈkiːnbɛʁk]) is a municipality in the district of Traunstein in Bavaria, Germany.
