= Staudach-Egerndach =

- Municipality
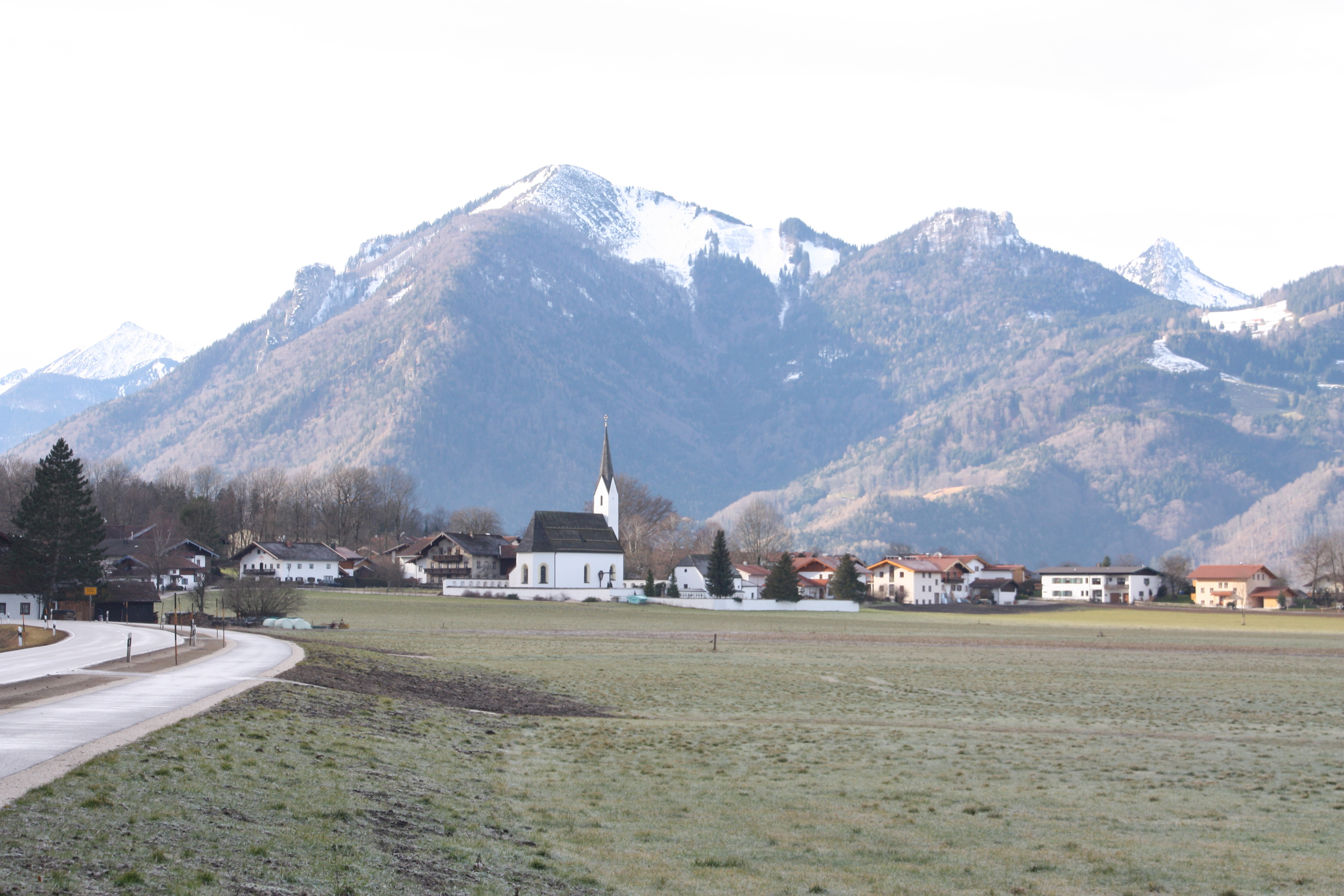
- General view of the village

- Coat of arms

- Location of Staudach-Egerndach within Traunstein district
- Interactive map of Staudach-Egerndach
- Location within Germany Location within Bavaria
- Coordinates: 47°47′N 12°29′E
- Country: Germany
- State: Bavaria
- Admin. region: Oberbayern
- District: Traunstein
- Municipal assoc.: Marquartstein

Government
  - Mayor (2020–26): Martina Gaukler

Area
  - Total: 19.34 km^{2} (7.47 sq mi)
- Elevation: 540 m (1,770 ft)

Population (2025-12-31)
  - Total: 1,109
  - Density: 57.34/km^{2} (148.5/sq mi)
- Time zone: UTC+01:00 (CET)
  - Summer (DST): UTC+02:00 (CEST)
- Postal codes: 83224
- Dialling codes: 08641
- Vehicle registration: TS
- Website: www.staudach-egerndach.de

Staudach-Egerndach (German pronunciation: [ˈʃtaʊdax ˈʔeːɡɐndax]) is a municipality in the district of Traunstein in Bavaria, Germany.

== Notable residents ==
- Therese ("Rosi") Brandl (1902–48), Nazi concentration camp guard executed for war crimes.
- Louis Kamper (1861–1953), prolific architect of buildings in Detroit, Michigan. Born in Staudach-Egerndach.
