= Schwarzlofer =

River in Germany

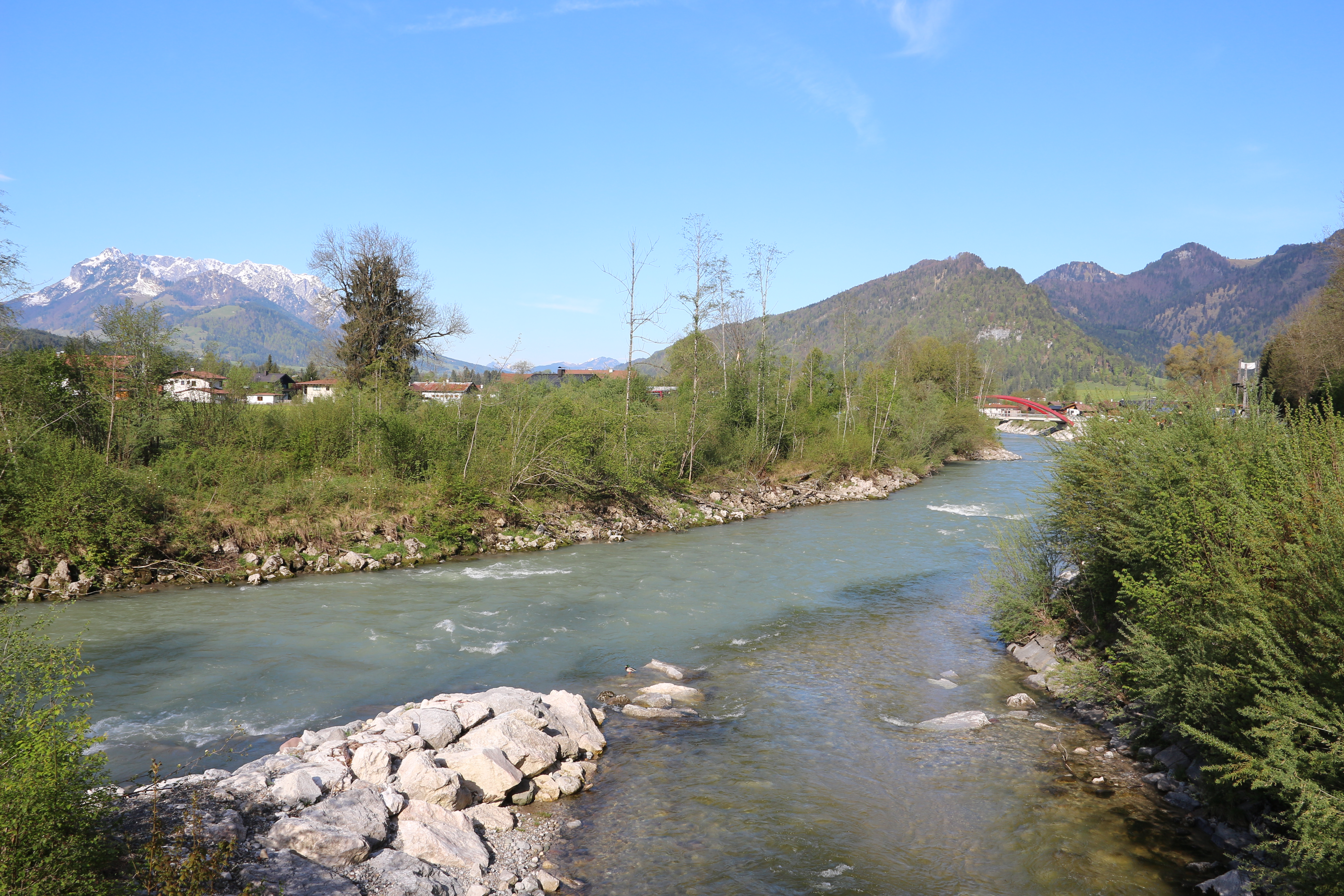
- Mouth of the Schwarzlofer (from bottom right) into the Großache (from bottom left to top right), in the background the Kaiser Mountains

Location
- Countries: Austria and Germany
- States: Tyrol and Bavaria

Physical characteristics
- Mouth
  - location: Großache
  - coordinates: 47.6619°N 12.4205°E
- Length: 16.2 km (10.1 mi)

Basin features
- Progression: Großache→ Alz→ Inn→ Danube→ Black Sea

Schwarzlofer is a river of Tyrol, Austria and Bavaria, Germany. Its source is on the Schwarzloferalm, north of Waidring (Tyrol). It passes through Reit im Winkl (Bavaria) and flows into the Großache near Kössen (Tyrol).

== See also ==
- List of rivers of Bavaria
