= Bergen (Verwaltungsgemeinschaft) =

- Verwaltungsgemeinschaft
- Location of Bergen within Traunstein district
- Interactive map of Bergen
- Location within Germany Location within Bavaria
- Coordinates: 47°48′N 12°35′E
- Country: Germany
- State: Bavaria
- Admin. region: Upper Bavaria
- District: Traunstein
- Seat: Bergen
- Subdivisions: 2 municipalities

Area
  - Total: 46.86 km^{2} (18.09 sq mi)

Population (2025-12-31)
  - Total: 6,359
  - Density: 135.7/km^{2} (351.5/sq mi)
- Time zone: UTC+01:00 (CET)
  - Summer (DST): UTC+02:00 (CEST)
- Website: www.bergen-chiemgau.de

Bergen is a Verwaltungsgemeinschaft (municipal association) in the district of Traunstein in Bavaria, Germany. Its seat is in Bergen.

It consists of the following municipalities:

1. Bergen
2. Vachendorf
