= Surberg =

- Municipality
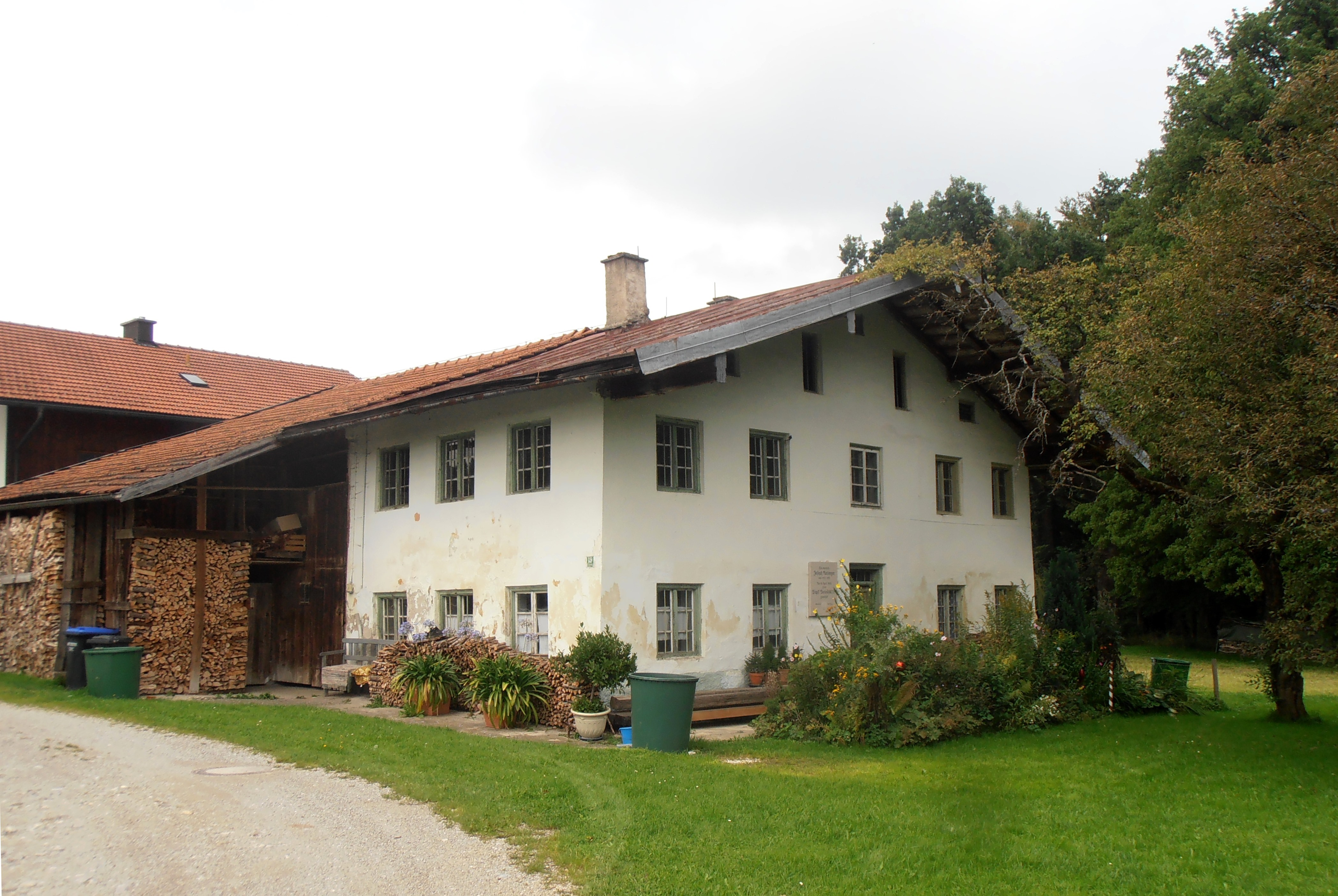
- Family house of Pope Benedict XVI

- Coat of arms

- Location of Surberg within Traunstein district
- Interactive map of Surberg
- Location within Germany Location within Bavaria
- Coordinates: 47°52′N 12°42′E
- Country: Germany
- State: Bavaria
- Admin. region: Oberbayern
- District: Traunstein

Government
  - Mayor (2020–26): Michael Wimmer

Area
  - Total: 23.74 km^{2} (9.17 sq mi)
- Elevation: 650 m (2,130 ft)

Population (2025-12-31)
  - Total: 3,203
  - Density: 134.9/km^{2} (349.4/sq mi)
- Time zone: UTC+01:00 (CET)
  - Summer (DST): UTC+02:00 (CEST)
- Postal codes: 83362
- Dialling codes: 0861 / 08666 / 08662
- Vehicle registration: TS
- Website: www.gemeinde-surberg.de

Surberg is a municipality in the district of Traunstein in Bavaria, Germany. It is 90 km (55.7 miles) southeast of the Bavarian capital of Munich.

== Sights ==
- Catholic parish church St. Georg
- Surberg Inn
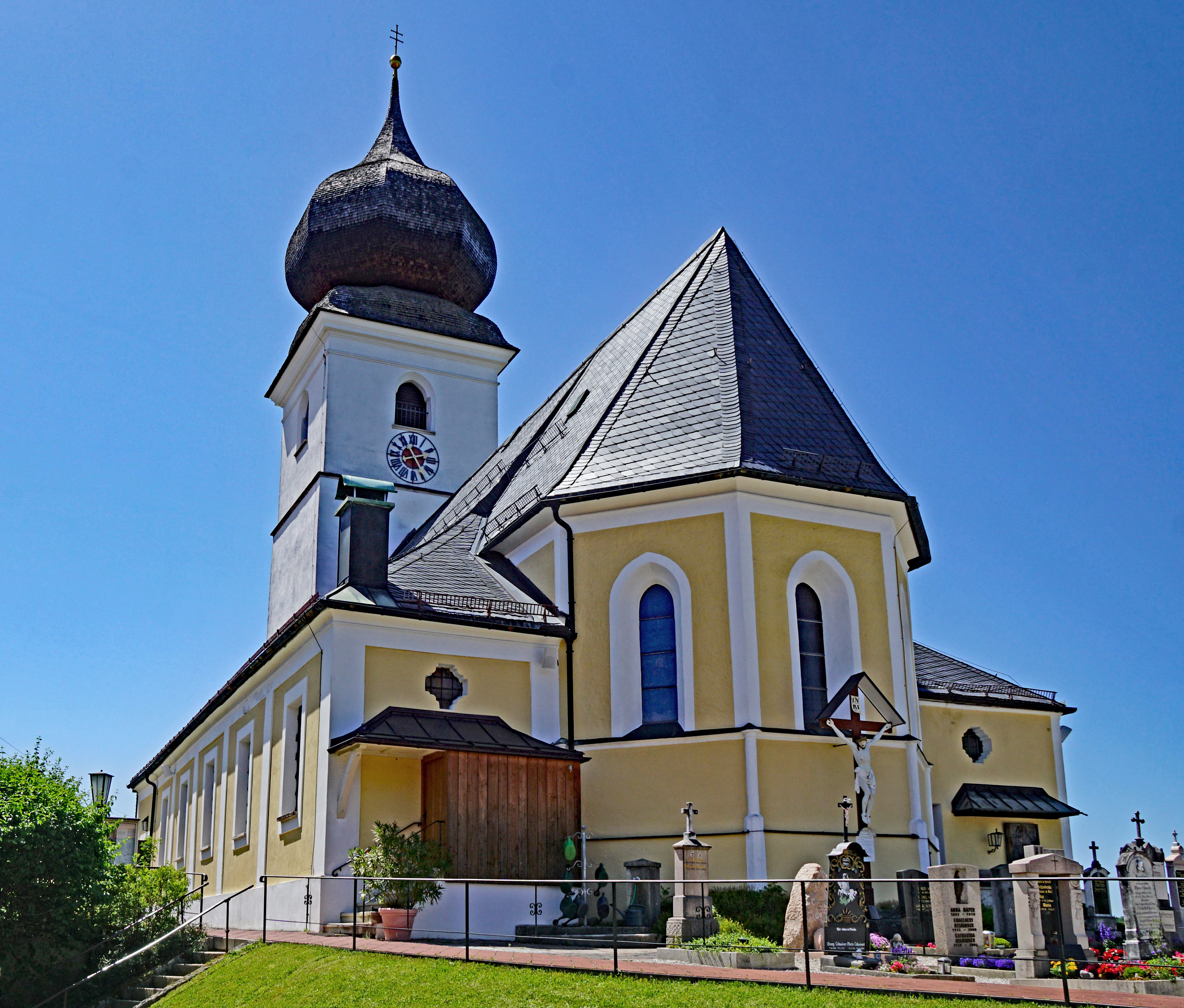
Parish church St. Georg

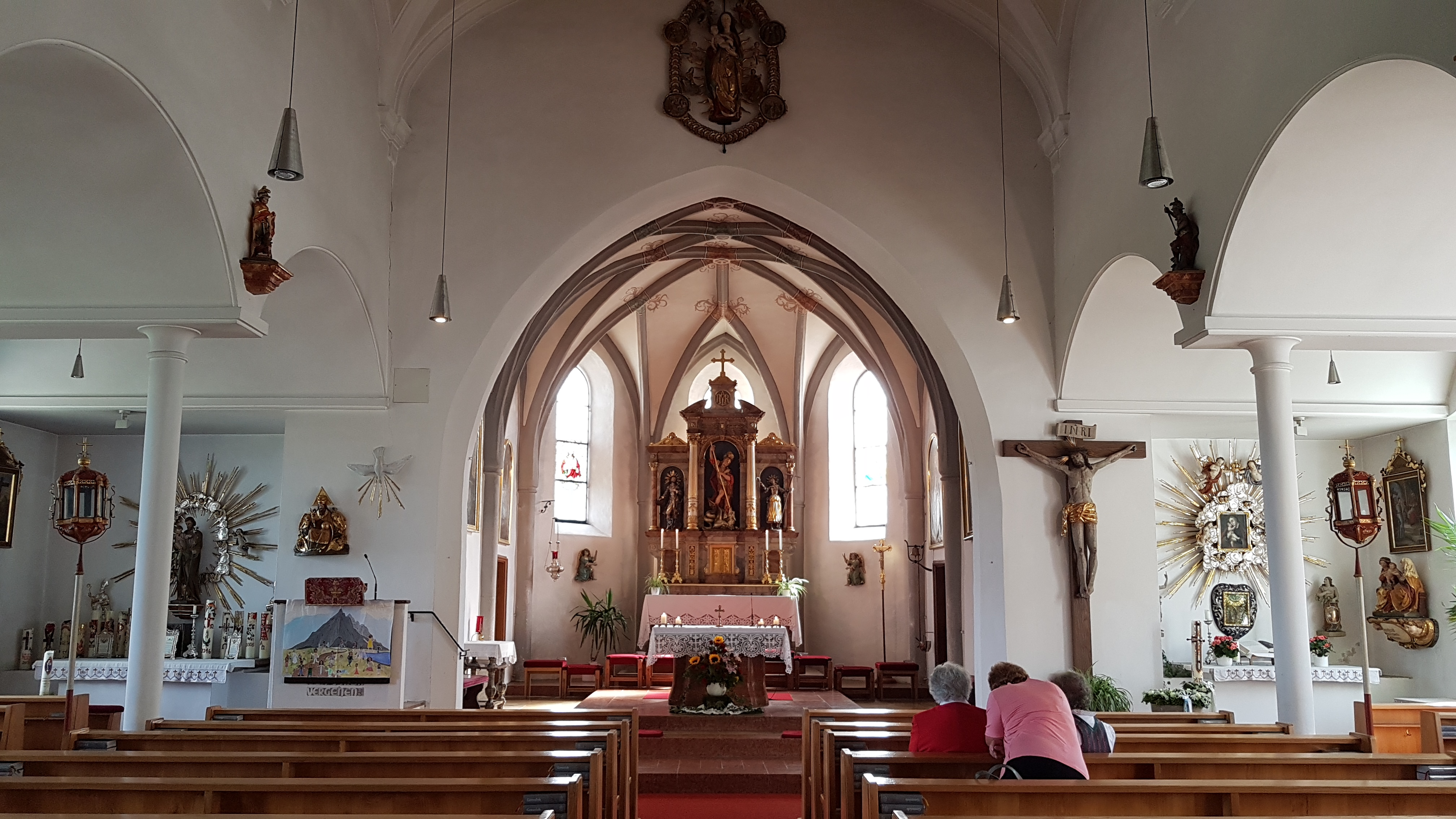
Interior of St. Georg

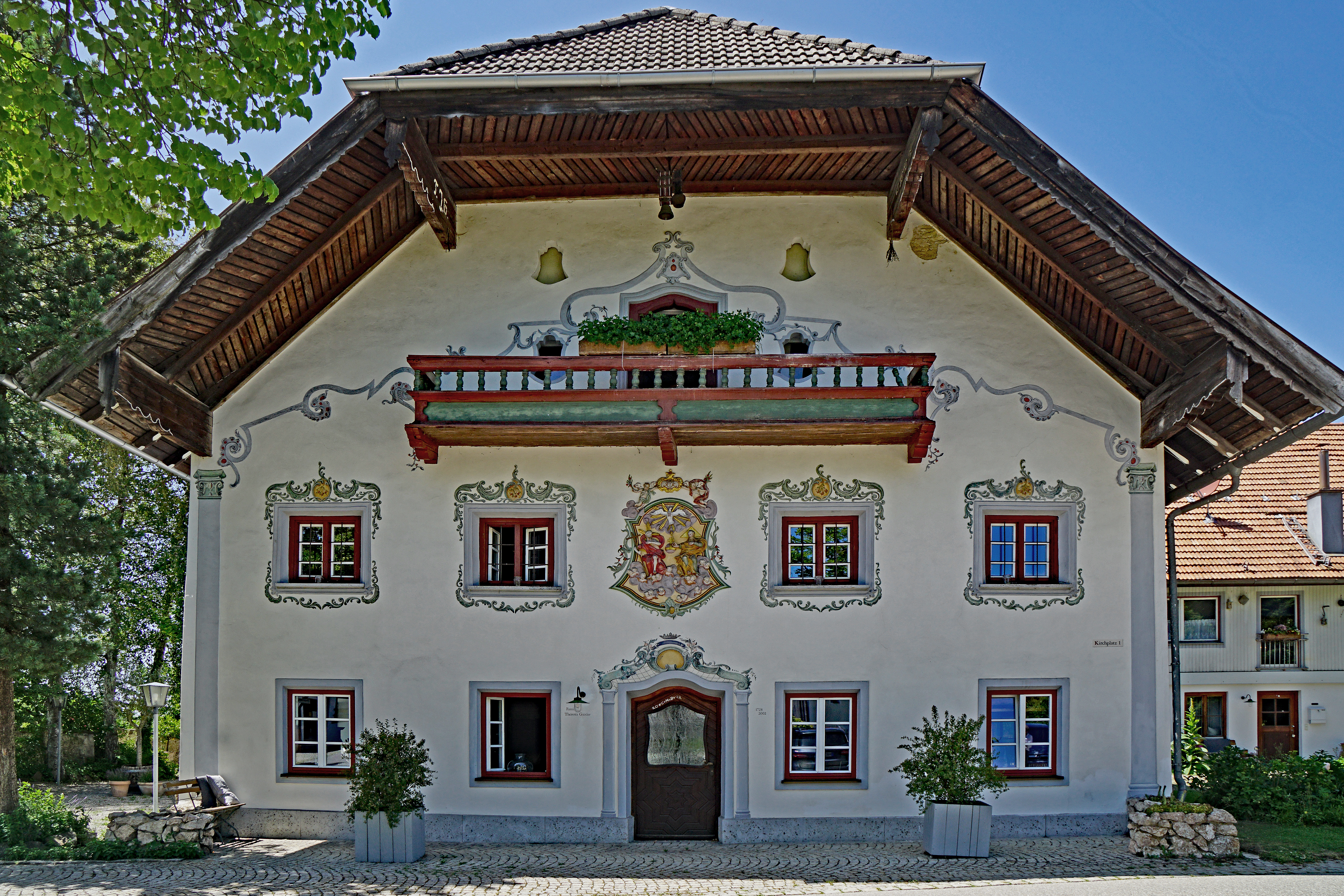
Surberg Inn
