= Bergen, Upper Bavaria =

Bergen
- Municipality
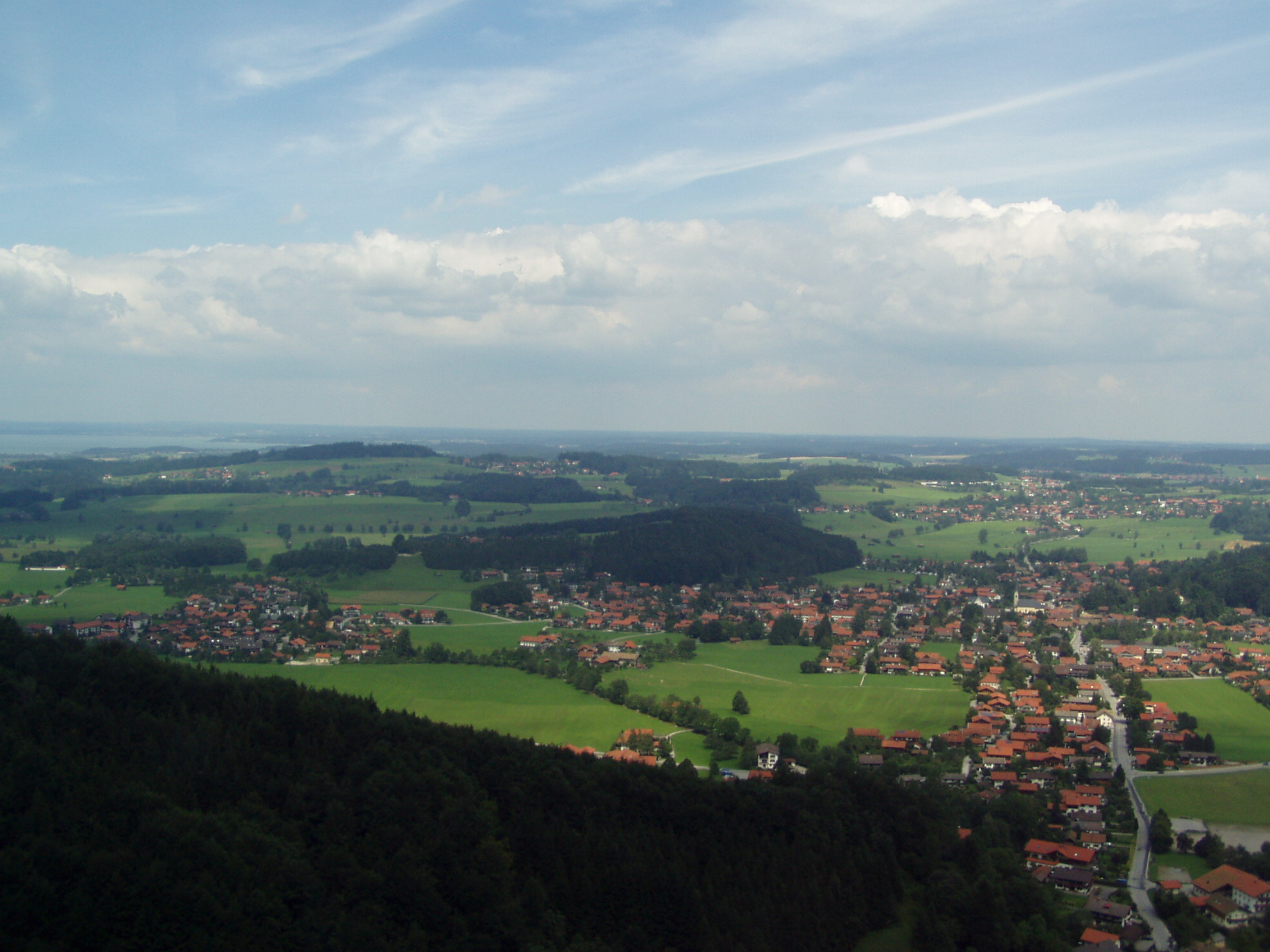
- Bergen

- Coat of arms

- Location of Bergen within Traunstein district
- Interactive map of Bergen
- Location within Germany Location within Bavaria
- Coordinates: 47°49′N 12°36′E
- Country: Germany
- State: Bavaria
- Admin. region: Oberbayern
- District: Traunstein
- Municipal assoc.: Bergen

Government
  - Mayor (2020–26): Stefan Schneider (Greens)

Area
  - Total: 36.9 km^{2} (14.2 sq mi)
- Elevation: 553 m (1,814 ft)

Population (2025-12-31)
  - Total: 4,609
  - Density: 125/km^{2} (324/sq mi)
- Time zone: UTC+01:00 (CET)
  - Summer (DST): UTC+02:00 (CEST)
- Postal codes: 83346
- Dialling codes: 08662
- Vehicle registration: TS
- Website: www.bergen-chiemgau.de

Bergen (German pronunciation: [ˈbɛʁɡn̩]) is a municipality in the district of Traunstein in Bavaria, Germany.
