= Marquartstein (Verwaltungsgemeinschaft) =

- Verwaltungsgemeinschaft
- Location of Marquartstein within Traunstein district
- Interactive map of Marquartstein
- Location within Germany Location within Bavaria
- Coordinates: 47°46′N 12°28′E
- Country: Germany
- State: Bavaria
- Admin. region: Upper Bavaria
- District: Traunstein
- Seat: Marquartstein
- Subdivisions: 2 municipalities

Area
  - Total: 52.56 km^{2} (20.29 sq mi)

Population (2025-12-31)
  - Total: 4,123
  - Density: 78.44/km^{2} (203.2/sq mi)
- Time zone: UTC+01:00 (CET)
  - Summer (DST): UTC+02:00 (CEST)
- Website: www.marquartstein.de

Marquartstein is a Verwaltungsgemeinschaft (municipal association) in the district of Traunstein in Bavaria, Germany. Its seat is in Marquartstein.

It consists of the following municipalities:

1. Marquartstein
2. Staudach-Egerndach
