= Pittenhart =

- Municipality
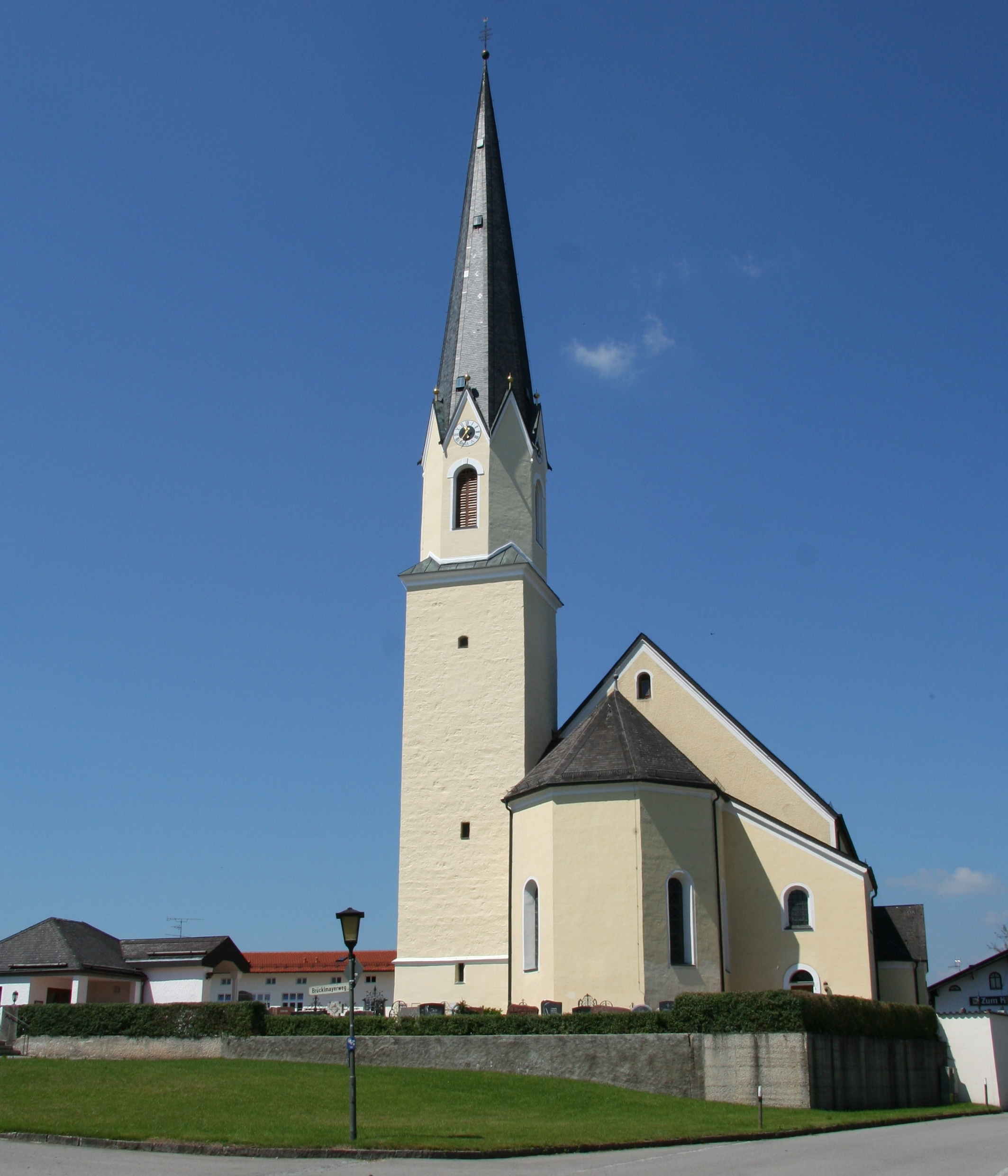
- Saint Nicholas Church

- Coat of arms

- Location of Pittenhart within Traunstein district
- Interactive map of Pittenhart
- Location within Germany Location within Bavaria
- Coordinates: 47°59′N 12°23′E
- Country: Germany
- State: Bavaria
- Admin. region: Oberbayern
- District: Traunstein
- Municipal assoc.: Obing

Government
  - Mayor (2020–26): Josef Reithmeier (CSU)

Area
  - Total: 27.91 km^{2} (10.78 sq mi)
- Elevation: 564 m (1,850 ft)

Population (2025-12-31)
  - Total: 1,903
  - Density: 68.18/km^{2} (176.6/sq mi)
- Time zone: UTC+01:00 (CET)
  - Summer (DST): UTC+02:00 (CEST)
- Postal codes: 83132
- Dialling codes: 08624
- Vehicle registration: TS
- Website: www.pittenhart.de

Pittenhart (German pronunciation: [ˈpɪtn̩haʁt]) is a municipality in the district of Traunstein in Bavaria, Germany.
