= Traunstein (district) =

Coordinates: 47°50′N 12°35′E

- District
- Flag Coat of arms
- Country: Germany
- State: Bavaria
- Adm. region: Upper Bavaria
- Capital: Traunstein

Government
  - District admin.: Siegfried Walch (CSU)

Area
  - Total: 1,533.92 km^{2} (592.25 sq mi)

Population (31 December 2025)
  - Total: 175,319
  - Density: 114.295/km^{2} (296.022/sq mi)
- Time zone: UTC+01:00 (CET)
  - Summer (DST): UTC+02:00 (CEST)
- Vehicle registration: TS, LF
- Website: http://www.traunstein.com

Traunstein is a Landkreis (district) in the southeastern part of Bavaria, Germany. Neighboring districts are (from the north clockwise) Mühldorf, Altötting, the Austrian states Upper Austria and Salzburg, the district Berchtesgadener Land, the Austrian states of Salzburg and Tyrol, and the district Rosenheim.

== Geography ==
The district is located in the northern foothills of the Alps. The Chiemsee is located in the west of the district.

== History ==
In 1972 the district was merged with parts of the former district of Laufen, and the previously independent urban district Traunstein.

== Coat of arms ==
The coat of arms shows a blue panther to the left, the symbol of the Spanheim dynasty of the Counts of Krainburg-Ortenburg, who owned part of the area in medieval times. The eagle in the top-right derives from the diocese of Chiemsee. At the bottom right there are the Canting Arms of Baumburg Abbey (Baumburg translates to tree-castle), which ruled most of the northern part of the district.

== Towns and municipalities ==
Clickable map of towns and municipalities in the district

Towns

1. Tittmoning
2. Traunreut
3. Traunstein
4. Trostberg

Markt

1. Grassau

Municipalities

1. Altenmarkt an der Alz
2. Chieming
3. Engelsberg
4. Fridolfing
5. Grabenstätt
6. Inzell
7. Kirchanschöring
8. Nußdorf
9. Palling
10. Petting
11. Reit im Winkl
12. Ruhpolding
13. Schleching
14. Schnaitsee
15. Seeon-Seebruck
16. Siegsdorf
17. Surberg
18. Tacherting
19. Übersee
20. Unterwössen

Verwaltungsgemeinschaften
1. Bergen; 1. Bergen^{1}; 2. Vachendorf	2. Marquartstein; 1. Marquartstein^{1}; 2. Staudach-Egerndach	3. Obing; 1. Kienberg; 2. Obing^{1}; 3. Pittenhart	4. Waging am See; 1. Taching am See; 2. Waging am See^{1,2}; 3. Wonneberg
^{1}seat of the Verwaltungsgemeinschaft; ^{2}Markt
