= Petting, Bavaria =

Petting
- Municipality
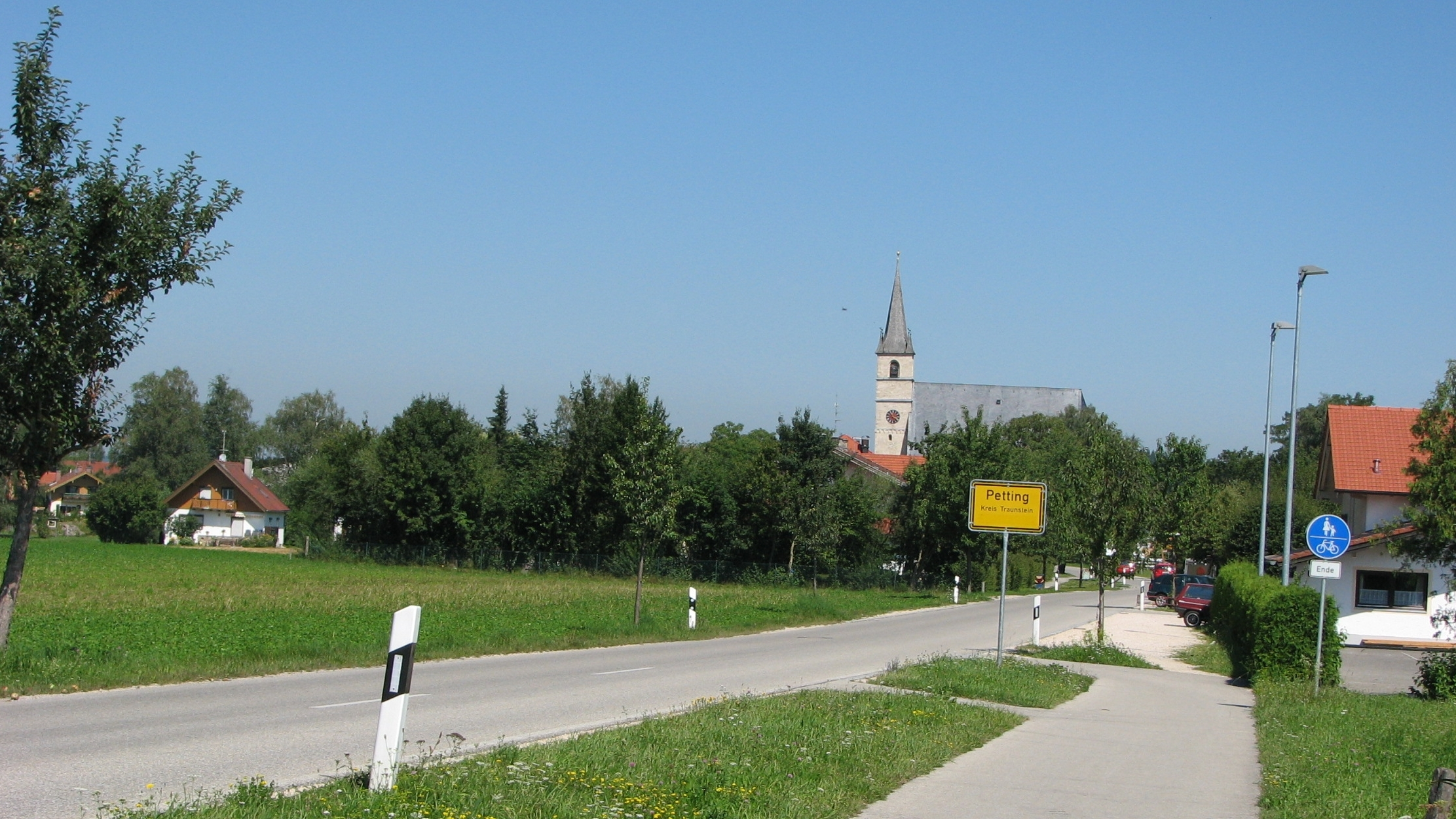
- Petting as viewed from South

- Coat of arms

- Location of Petting within Traunstein district
- Interactive map of Petting
- Location within Germany Location within Bavaria
- Coordinates: 47°55′N 12°49′E
- Country: Germany
- State: Bavaria
- Admin. region: Oberbayern
- District: Traunstein
- Subdivisions: Hauptorte: Petting, Ringham, Schönram, Kühnhausen

Government
  - Mayor (2020–26): Karl Lanzinger (CSU)

Area
  - Total: 29.92 km^{2} (11.55 sq mi)
- Elevation: 451 m (1,480 ft)

Population (2025-12-31)
  - Total: 2,232
  - Density: 74.60/km^{2} (193.2/sq mi)
- Time zone: UTC+01:00 (CET)
  - Summer (DST): UTC+02:00 (CEST)
- Postal codes: 83367, 83419
- Dialling codes: 08686
- Vehicle registration: TS
- Website: www.gemeinde-petting.de

Petting (German pronunciation: [ˈpɛtɪŋ]) is a municipality in the district Traunstein, Bavaria, Germany. It is located on the shore of the Waginger See, a diluvial lake.

The first mention of the municipality was in 1048 with the name Pettinga; however, it is possible that the settlement already existed at the time of the Roman Empire. In 1180 it came into the ownership of the monastery St. Zeno.

== History ==
Petting, built on a wash-up from the last Ice age, is said to have once been an island when large areas were still under water. The island was considered safe and secure and was already inhabited at that time.

The place is said to have had a church as early as 800, but it was destroyed by the Hungarians around 900. On the square of the church stood allegedly the castle of the nobles of Pettingen. This noble family dates back to the 6th century. It is assumed that the following lords took the name of the village as their own. It is also assumed that Petting already existed in Roman times and had the same name at that time.

The village was first mentioned in 1048 as "Pettinga". In 1335, the parish of Petting was incorporated into the monastery of St. Zeno in Reichenhall. Petting was the seat of a chair of the Archbishopric of Salzburg and fell to Archduke Ferdinand of Tuscany during secularization in 1803, to Austria in 1805, which Petting had to cede to the Kingdom of Bavaria in 1810. Petting then became an independent political municipality through the municipal edict of 1818.
