= Amerang =

- Municipality
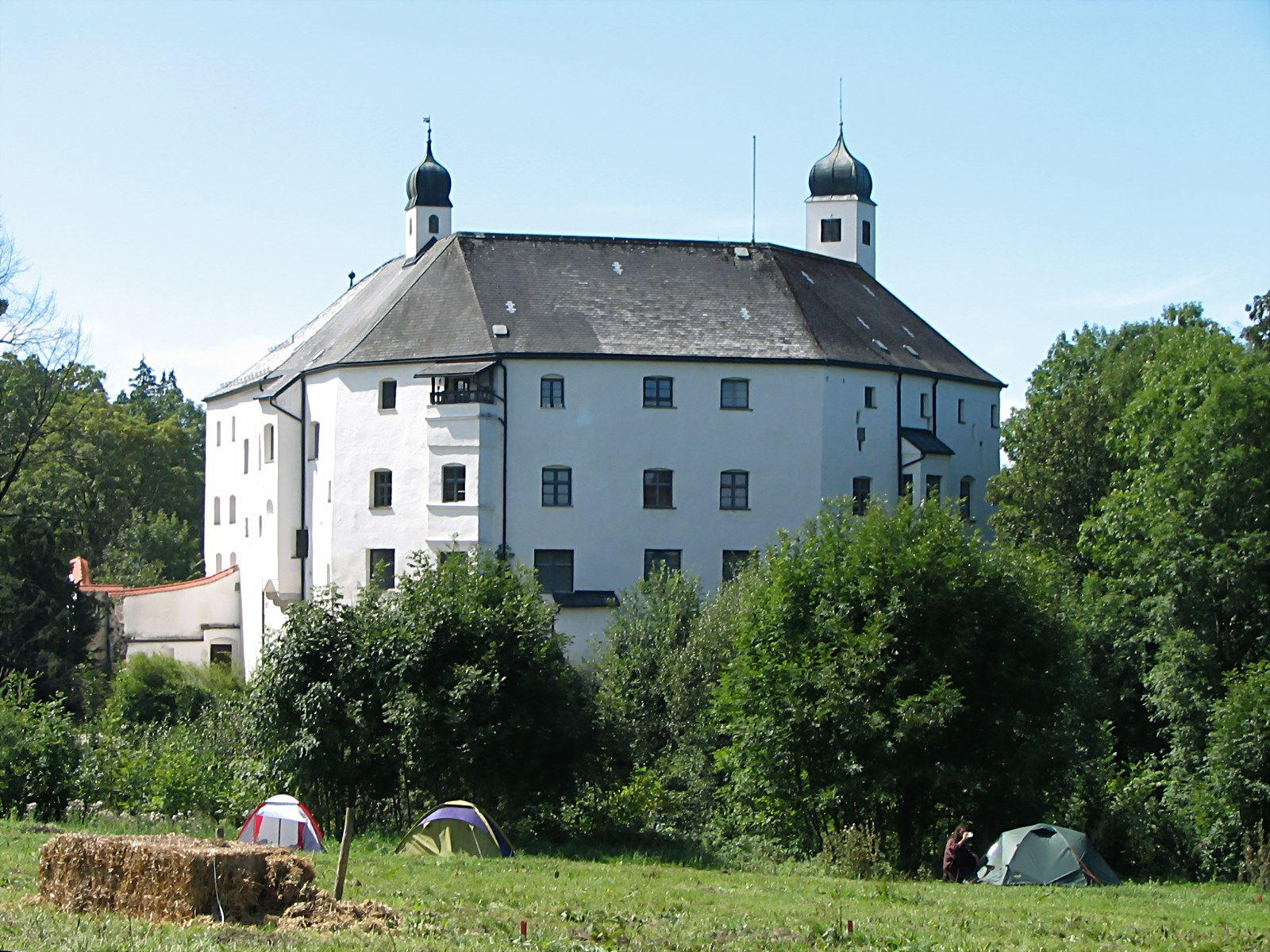
- Amerang Castle

- Coat of arms

- Location of Amerang within Rosenheim district
- Interactive map of Amerang
- Location within Germany Location within Bavaria
- Coordinates: 47°59′30″N 12°18′34″E
- Country: Germany
- State: Bavaria
- Admin. region: Oberbayern
- District: Rosenheim

Government
  - Mayor (2020–26): Konrad Linner

Area
  - Total: 39.81 km^{2} (15.37 sq mi)
- Elevation: 537 m (1,762 ft)

Population (2025-12-31)
  - Total: 3,834
  - Density: 96.31/km^{2} (249.4/sq mi)
- Time zone: UTC+01:00 (CET)
  - Summer (DST): UTC+02:00 (CEST)
- Postal codes: 83123, 83552
- Dialling codes: 08075
- Vehicle registration: RO
- Website: www.amerang.de

Amerang (German pronunciation: [ˈaːməʁaŋ]) is a municipality and a village in the Rosenheim district in Bavaria, Germany.

It is located 10 kilometres (6.2 mi) south of Wasserburg am Inn. It is known for its historical car museum EFA-Museum für Deutsche Automobilgeschichte, an open air farmhouse museum and concerts in the Amerang Castle.

== See also ==
- Grub (Amerang)
- Kirchensur
