= Grabenstätt =

- Municipality
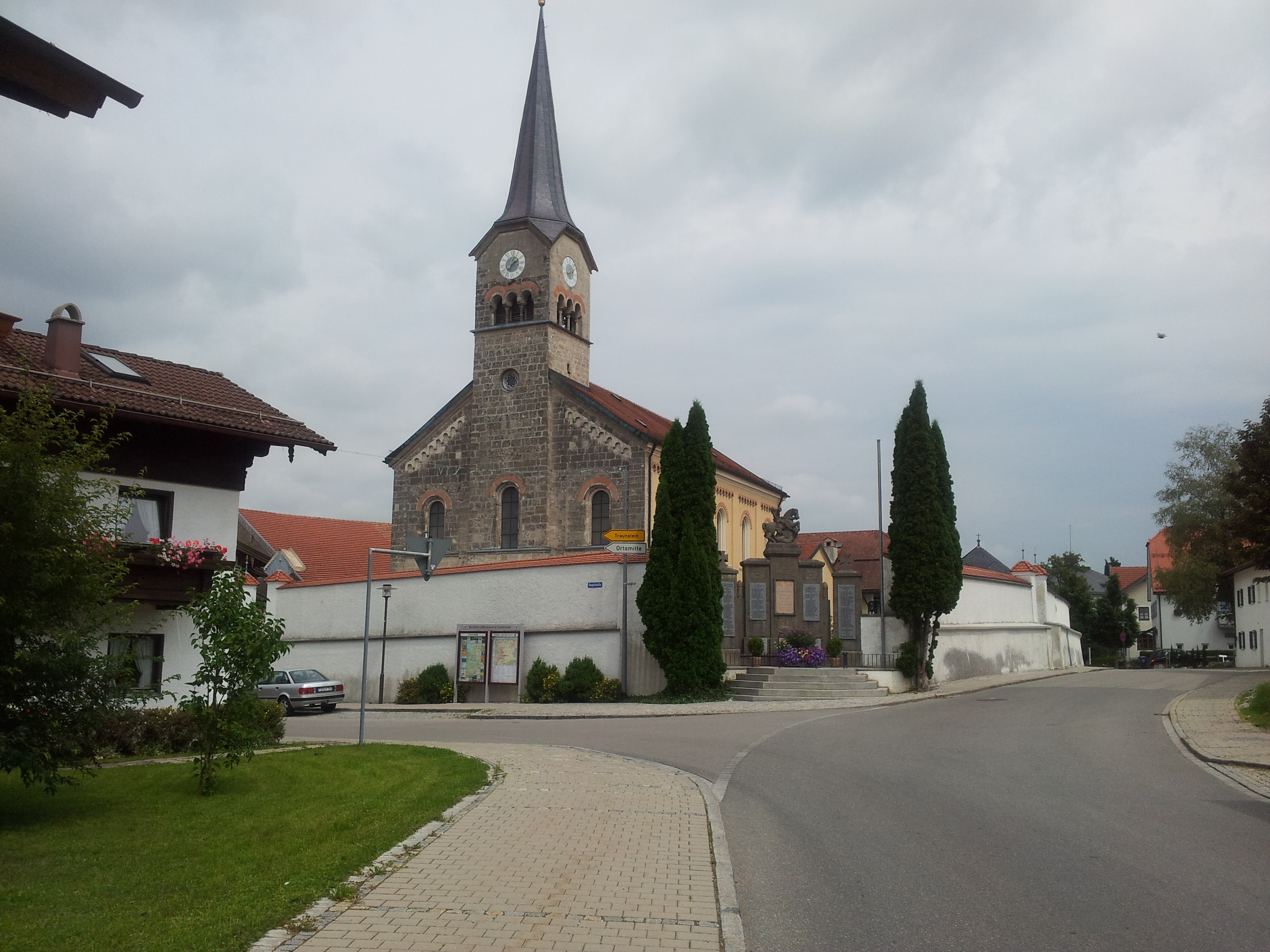
- Saint Maximilian Church

- Coat of arms

- Location of Grabenstätt within Traunstein district
- Interactive map of Grabenstätt
- Location within Germany Location within Bavaria
- Coordinates: 47°43′N 12°24′E
- Country: Germany
- State: Bavaria
- Admin. region: Oberbayern
- District: Traunstein

Government
  - Mayor (2020–26): Gerhard Wirnshofer

Area
  - Total: 37.81 km^{2} (14.60 sq mi)
- Elevation: 526 m (1,726 ft)

Population (2025-12-31)
  - Total: 4,305
  - Density: 113.9/km^{2} (294.9/sq mi)
- Time zone: UTC+01:00 (CET)
  - Summer (DST): UTC+02:00 (CEST)
- Postal codes: 83355
- Dialling codes: 08661
- Vehicle registration: TS
- Website: www.grabenstaett.de

Grabenstätt is a municipality in the district of Traunstein in Bavaria, Germany.
