= Obing =

- Municipality
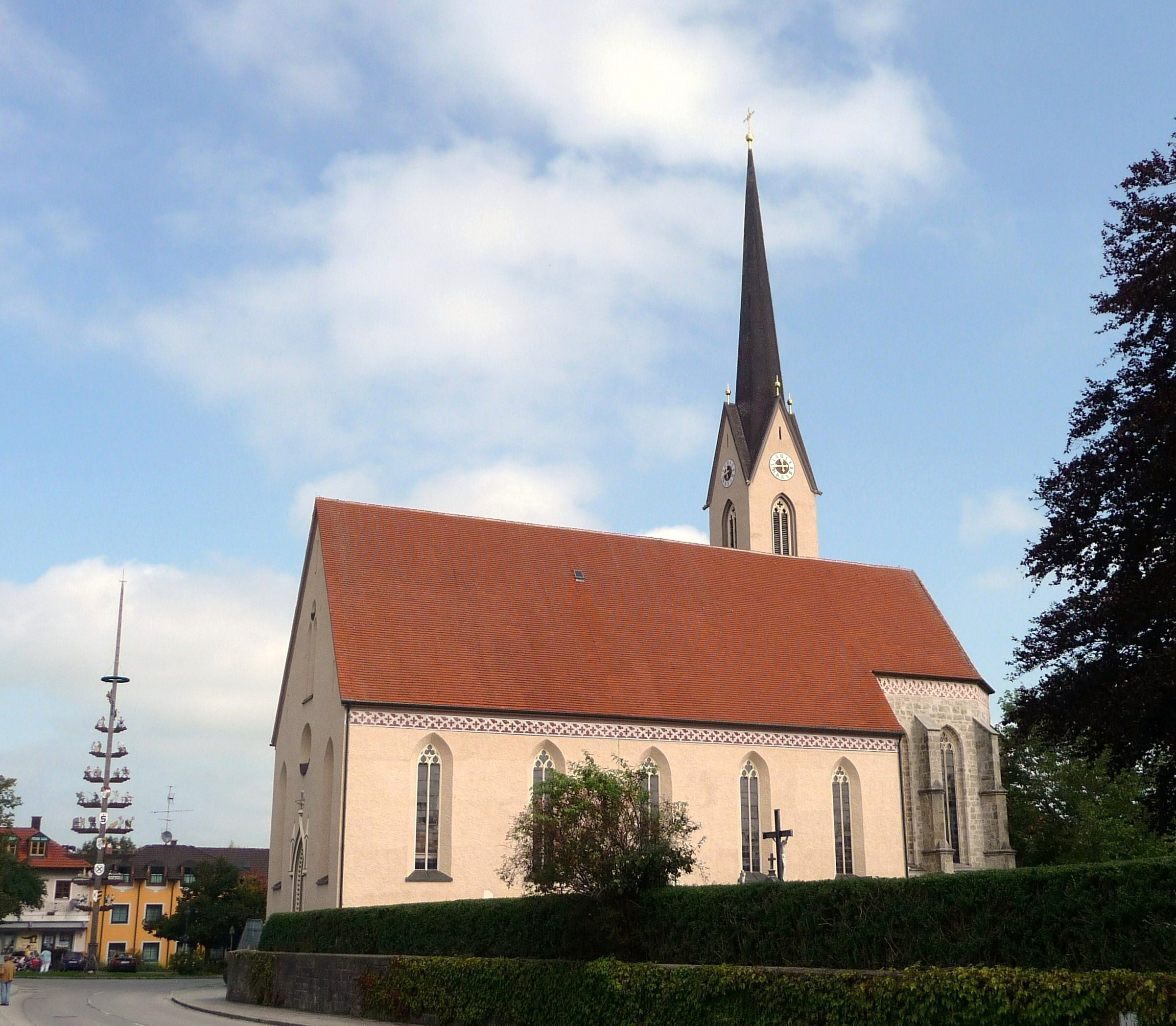
- Church of Saint Lawrence

- Coat of arms

- Location of Obing within Traunstein district
- Interactive map of Obing
- Location within Germany Location within Bavaria
- Coordinates: 48°0′N 12°25′E
- Country: Germany
- State: Bavaria
- Admin. region: Oberbayern
- District: Traunstein
- Municipal assoc.: Obing
- Subdivisions: 60 Ortsteile

Government
  - Mayor (2020–26): Josef Huber (FW)

Area
  - Total: 43.75 km^{2} (16.89 sq mi)
- Elevation: 562 m (1,844 ft)

Population (2025-12-31)
  - Total: 4,405
  - Density: 100.7/km^{2} (260.8/sq mi)
- Time zone: UTC+01:00 (CET)
  - Summer (DST): UTC+02:00 (CEST)
- Postal codes: 83119
- Dialling codes: 08624
- Vehicle registration: TS
- Website: www.obing.de

Obing (German pronunciation: [ˈoːbɪŋ]) is a municipality in the district of Traunstein in Bavaria, Germany.
