= Grassau, Bavaria =

- Municipality
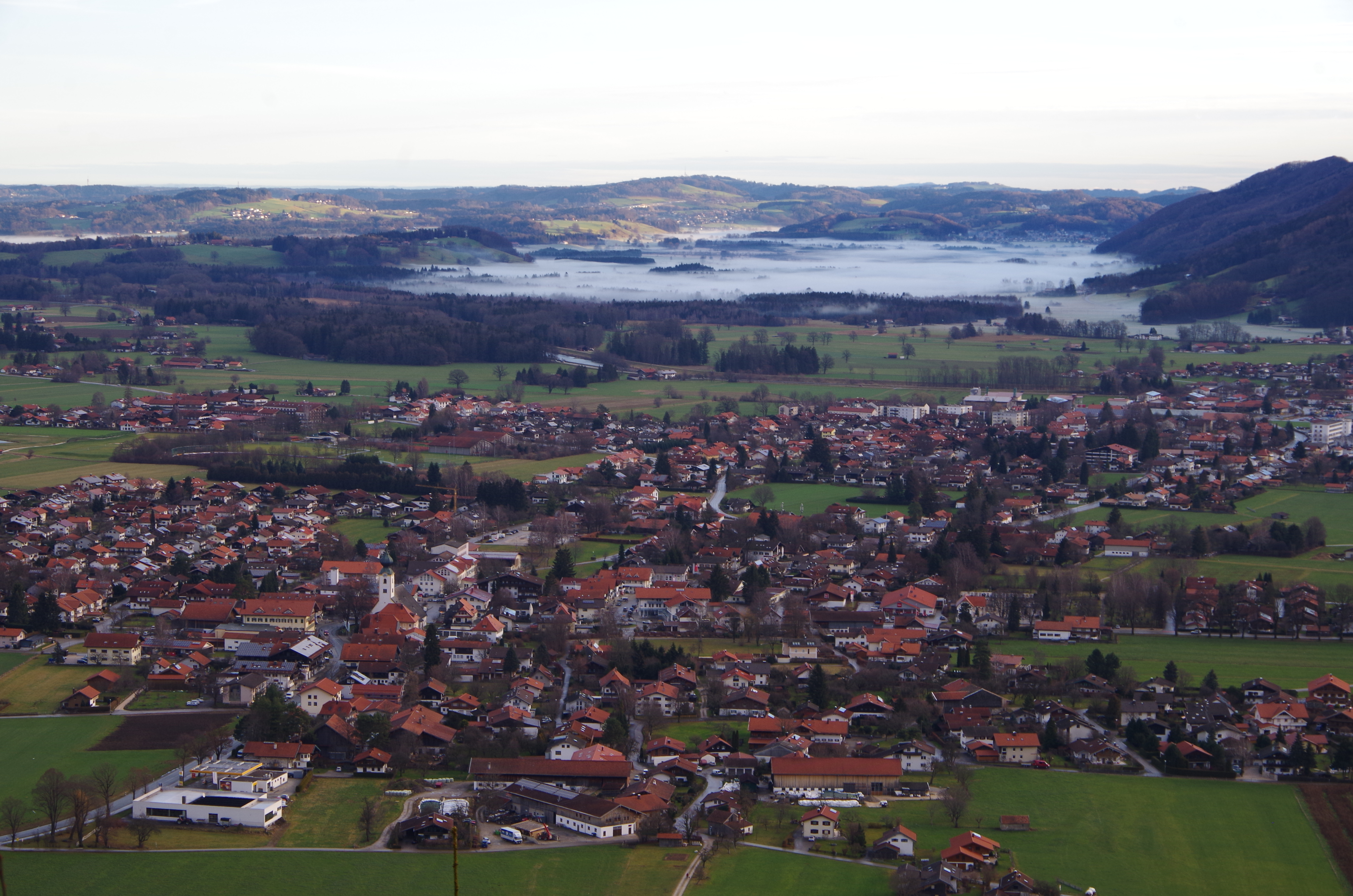
- Aerial view

- Coat of arms

- Location of Grassau, Bavaria within Traunstein district
- Interactive map of Grassau, Bavaria
- Location within Germany Location within Bavaria
- Coordinates: 47°46′44″N 12°27′00″E
- Country: Germany
- State: Bavaria
- Admin. region: Oberbayern
- District: Traunstein

Government
  - Mayor (2020–26): Stefan Kattari (SPD)

Area
  - Total: 35.76 km^{2} (13.81 sq mi)
- Elevation: 538 m (1,765 ft)

Population (2025-12-31)
  - Total: 6,963
  - Density: 194.7/km^{2} (504.3/sq mi)
- Time zone: UTC+01:00 (CET)
  - Summer (DST): UTC+02:00 (CEST)
- Postal codes: 83224
- Dialling codes: 08641
- Vehicle registration: TS
- Website: www.grassau.de

Grassau is a market town in the district of Traunstein in Bavaria in Germany. It is located south of lake Chiemsee in the valley of the Tiroler Ache.
