= Schnaitsee =

- Municipality
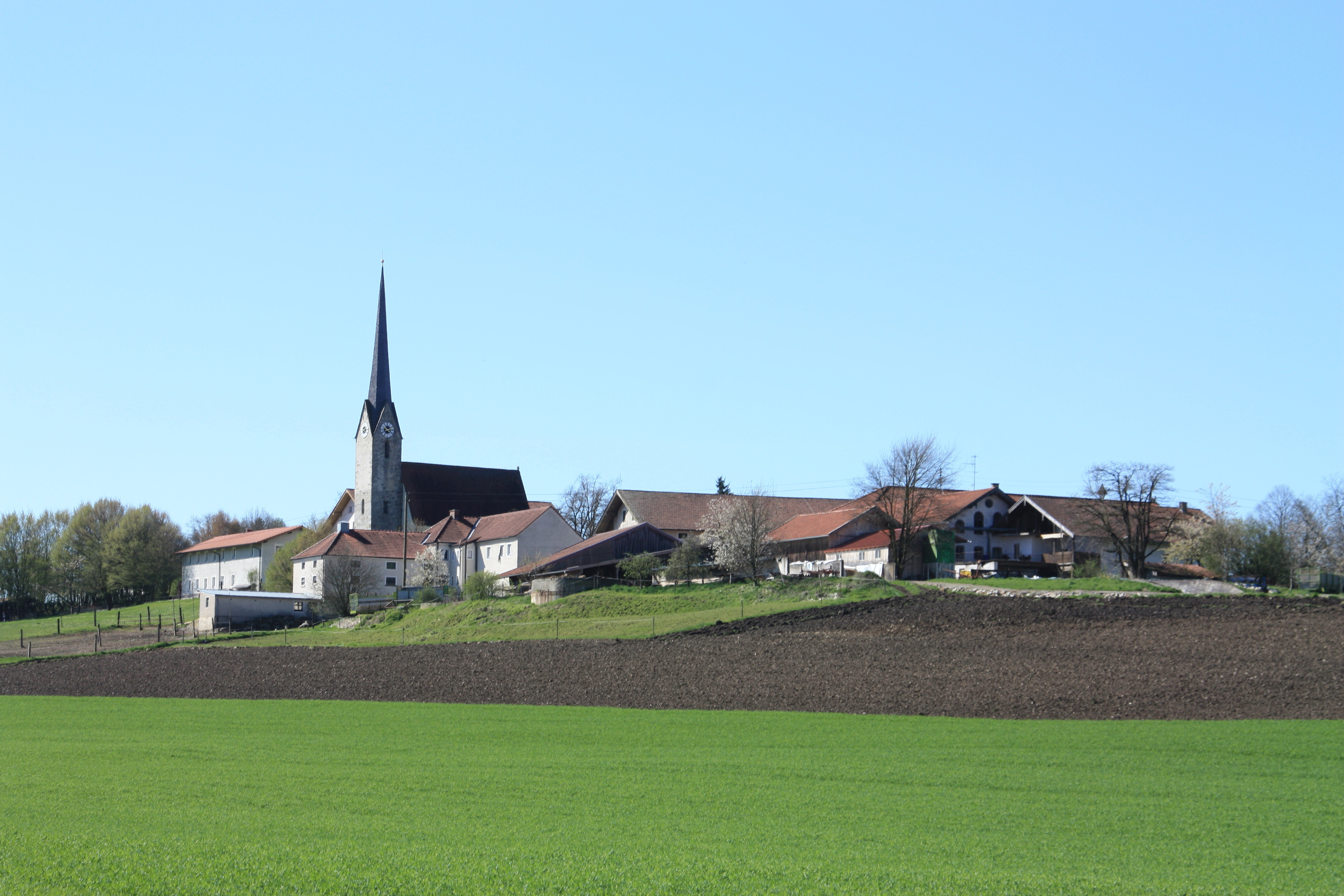
- Municipal district of Berg

- Coat of arms

- Location of Schnaitsee within Traunstein district
- Interactive map of Schnaitsee
- Location within Germany Location within Bavaria
- Coordinates: 48°4′N 12°22′E
- Country: Germany
- State: Bavaria
- Admin. region: Oberbayern
- District: Traunstein

Government
  - Mayor (2020–26): Thomas Schmidinger (CSU)

Area
  - Total: 61.14 km^{2} (23.61 sq mi)
- Elevation: 652.5 m (2,141 ft)

Population (2025-12-31)
  - Total: 3,726
  - Density: 60.94/km^{2} (157.8/sq mi)
- Time zone: UTC+01:00 (CET)
  - Summer (DST): UTC+02:00 (CEST)
- Postal codes: 83530
- Dialling codes: 08074
- Vehicle registration: TS
- Website: www.schnaitsee.de

Schnaitsee (German pronunciation: [ˈʃnaɪtˌzeː]; Bavarian: Schnoatsee) is a municipality in the district of Traunstein in Bavaria, Germany.
