= Schleching =

- Municipality
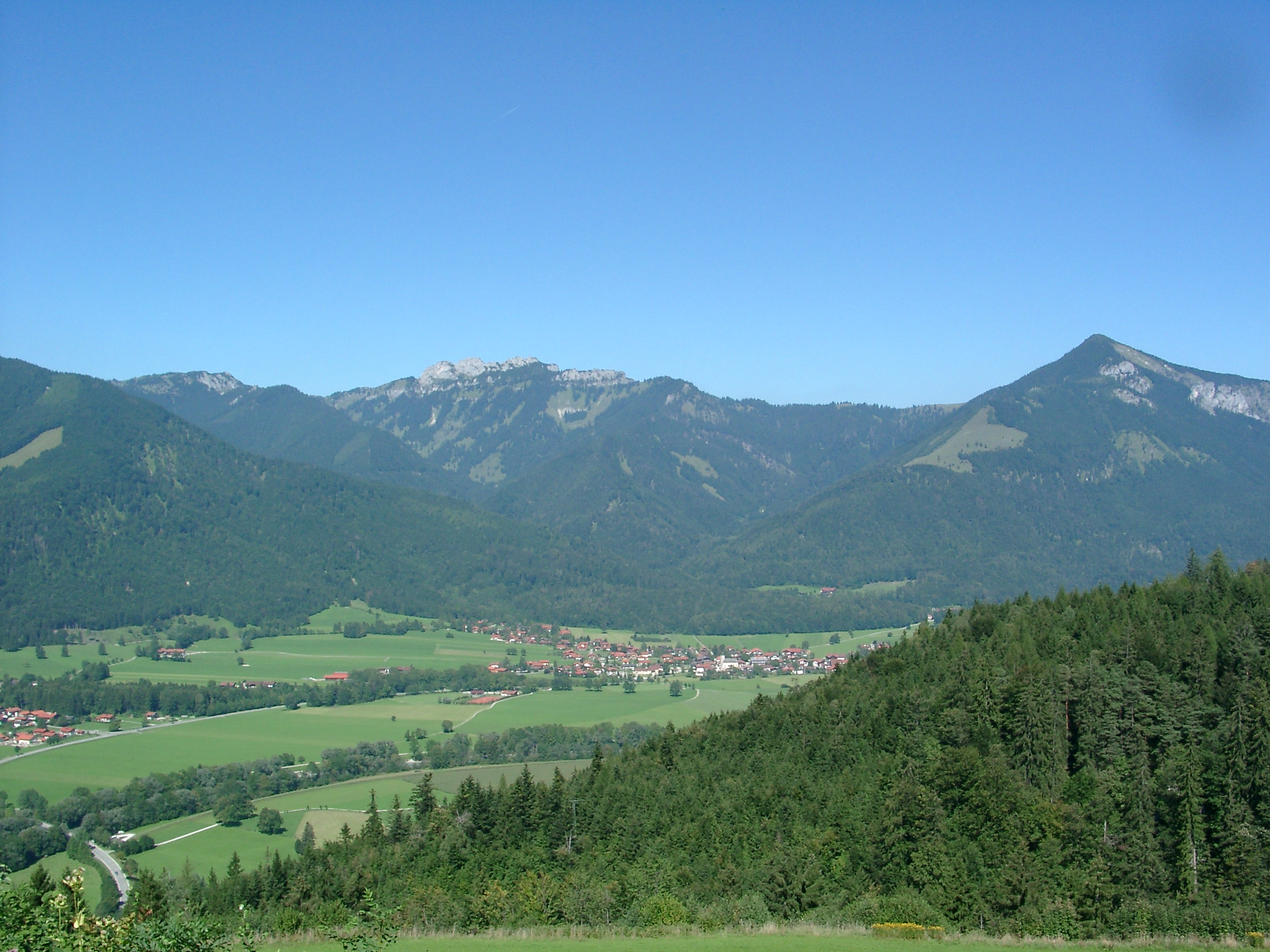
- Schleching with Kampenwand and Hochplatte

- Coat of arms

- Location of Schleching within Traunstein district
- Interactive map of Schleching
- Location within Germany Location within Bavaria
- Coordinates: 47°43′N 12°24′E
- Country: Germany
- State: Bavaria
- Admin. region: Oberbayern
- District: Traunstein

Government
  - Mayor (2020–26): Josef Loferer

Area
  - Total: 45.17 km^{2} (17.44 sq mi)
- Elevation: 567 m (1,860 ft)

Population (2025-12-31)
  - Total: 1,747
  - Density: 38.68/km^{2} (100.2/sq mi)
- Time zone: UTC+01:00 (CET)
  - Summer (DST): UTC+02:00 (CEST)
- Postal codes: 83259
- Dialling codes: 08649
- Vehicle registration: TS
- Website: www.schleching.de

Schleching (German pronunciation: [ˈʃlɛçɪŋ]) is a municipality and a village in Traunstein district in Bavaria, Germany.
