= Leukental =

Valley in North Tyrol, Austria

Coordinates: 47°32′45″N 12°26′37″E

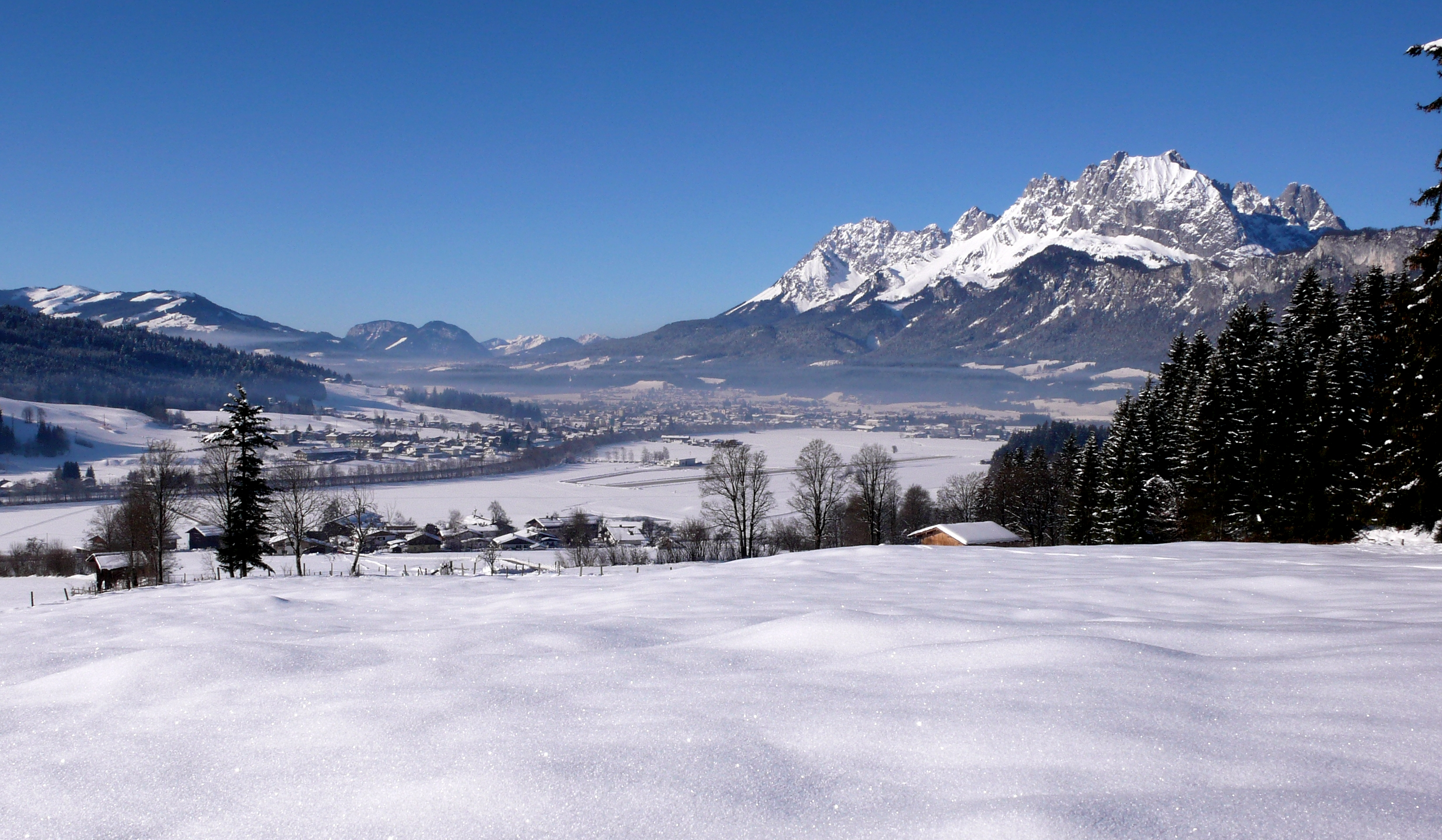
The Leukental and the Wilder Kaiser in winter

The Leukental is a valley in North Tyrol in the district of Kitzbühel in Austria. The Leukental runs north to south from the Thurn Pass to the Bavarian border, but is not just defined as the main valley but includes several smaller side valleys. The river flowing through the Leukental is known as the Jochberger Ache from its source at the Thurn Pass to Kitzbühel, then as the Kitzbühler Ache from Kitzbühel to St. Johann in Tirol and, from its confluence with the Fieberbrunner Ache near St. Johann in Tirol, as the Großache. After leaving the Leukentals and Tyrol the river is known in Bavaria as the Tiroler Ache until it discharges into the Chiemsee lake, and its valley is known as the Achental. The parishes in the Leukental are: Jochberg, Aurach bei Kitzbühel, Kitzbühel, Oberndorf in Tirol, St. Johann in Tirol, Kirchdorf and Kössen.

The name "Leukental" might almost have been forgotten by the 20th century because, from the middle of the 19th century the name "Großachental" had become common. This was mainly because it was a time when the imperial and royal monarchy wanted to survey all crown lands precisely and the state surveyors, who were mostly from Bohemia, did not often quite understand Alpine dialects and many names were entered on the maps without being researched.

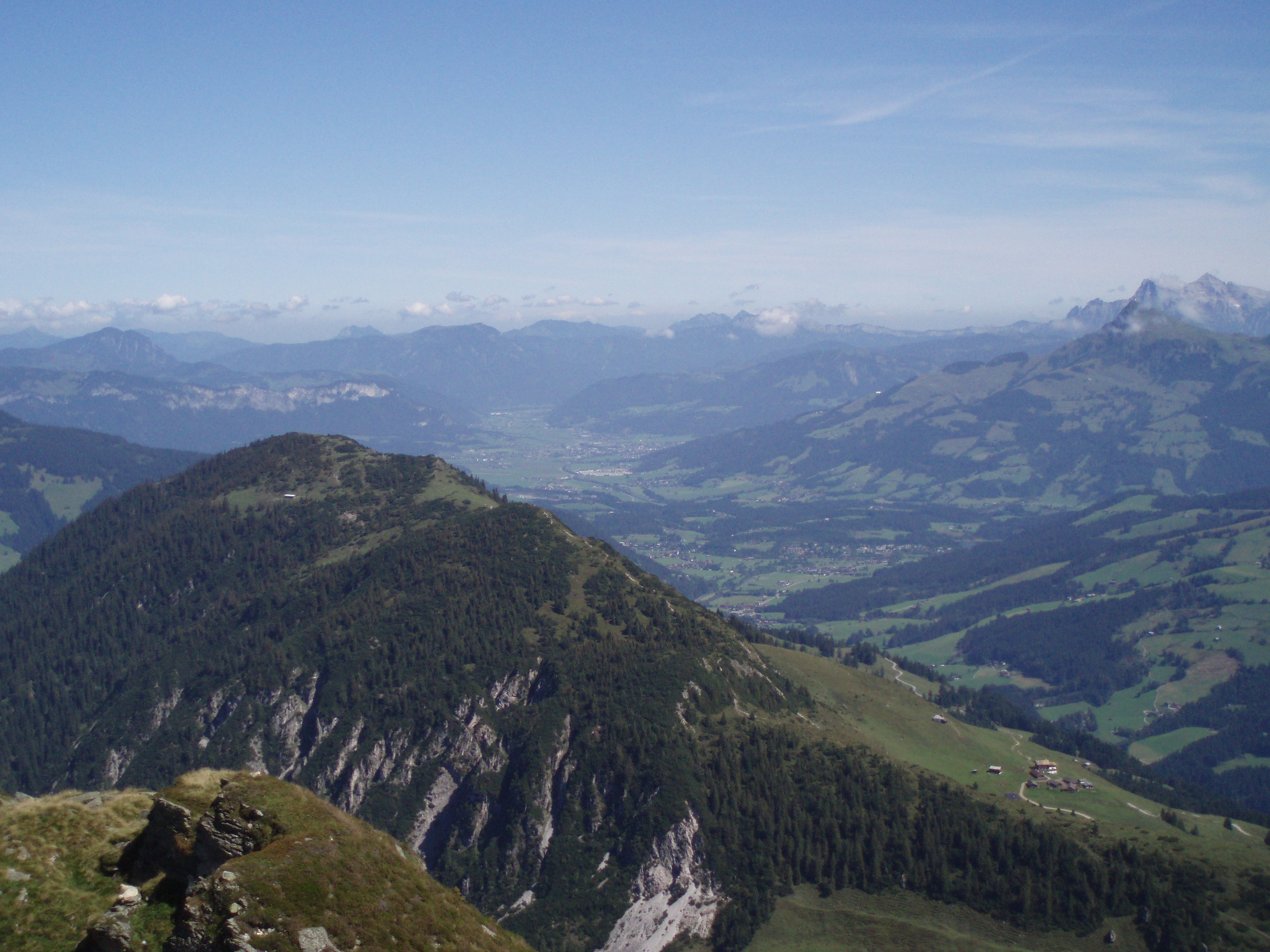
The Leukental from the Gampenkogel, looking north. Also visible are St. Johann in Tirol and the Kitzbüheler Horn.

For example, the erroneous change of the name of the valley to the name of the river could be explained because the state surveyor may have asked the name of the river and would have been told "that is the große Ache." As a result, even today the name "Großachental" appears in most of the maps.

During the 20th century the incorrect belief also arose that the Leukental ran from the Inn valley near Wörgl via Söll and Ellmau to St. Johann, so that the station near Bruckhäusl (in the town of Wörgl) was called "Söll-Leukental" until a few years ago. In 1875, when the station was built, it was thought that you could get off at this station and continue your journey to Söll and then via Ellmau and Going enter the Leukental. Over the decades the error was perpetuated that the Leukental ran from Wörgl via Söll, Scheffau, Ellmau and Going to St. Johann.

The local Kitzühel historian, Peter Brandstätter, who died in November 2008, gave the Leukental its name back by raising the awareness of the issue with the public authorities through letters and publications. He even managed to persuade the Austrian Federal Railways to change the name of the station from "Söll-Leukental" to "Bruckhäusl".
