= Kirchdorf in Tirol =

- Municipality
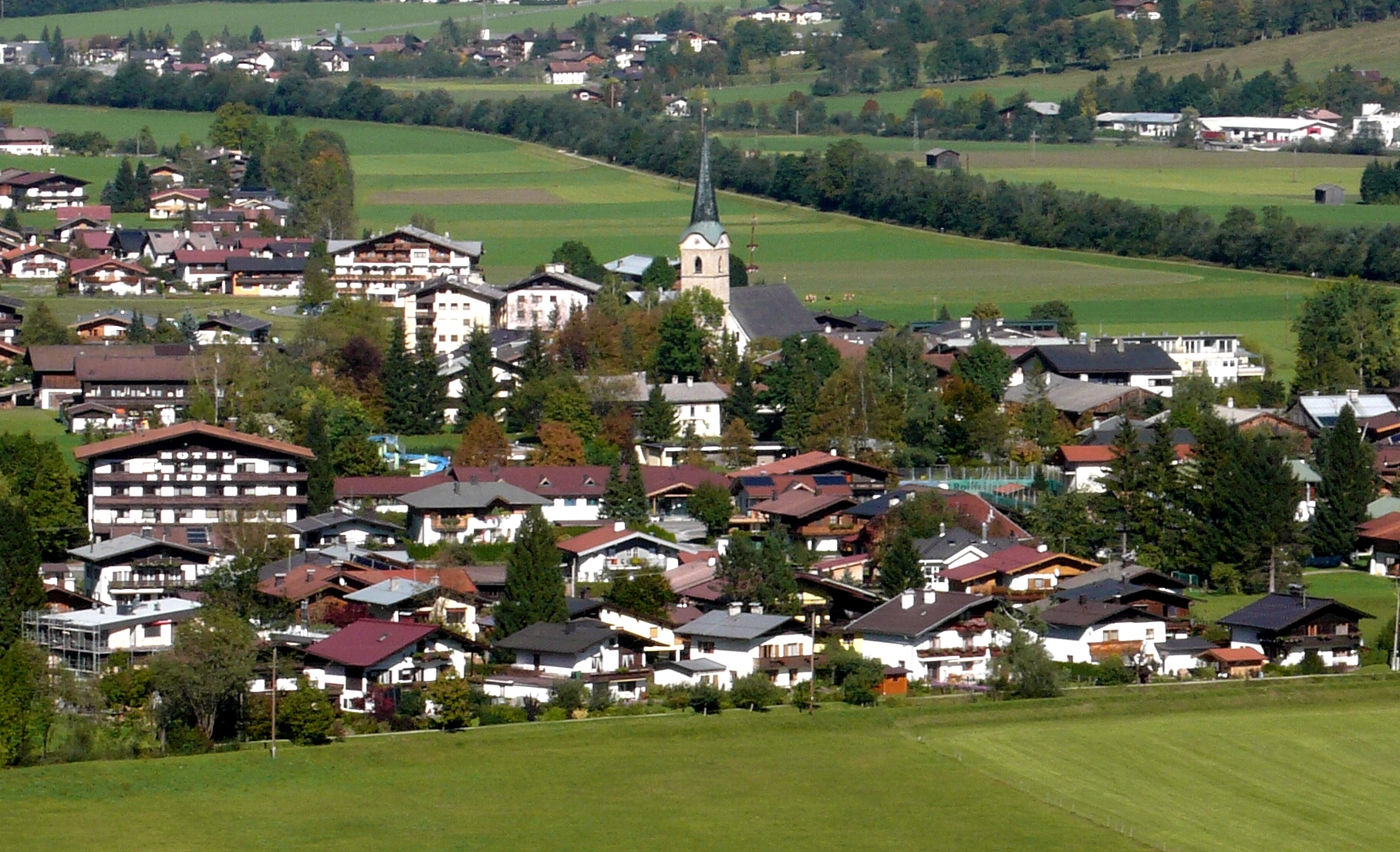

- Coat of arms

- Location within Austria
- Coordinates: 47°33′30″N 12°26′51″E
- Country: Austria
- State: Tyrol
- District: Kitzbühel

Government
  - Mayor: Gerhard Obermüller (KOASA KRAFT)

Area
  - Total: 113.83 km^{2} (43.95 sq mi)
- Elevation: 641 m (2,103 ft)

Population (2018-01-01)
  - Total: 3,936
  - Density: 34.58/km^{2} (89.56/sq mi)
- Time zone: UTC+1 (CET)
  - Summer (DST): UTC+2 (CEST)
- Postal code: 6382
- Area code: 05352
- Vehicle registration: KB
- Website: www.kirchdorf.tirol.gv.at

Kirchdorf in Tirol is a municipality in the Kitzbühel district in the Austrian state of Tyrol located 12.2 km (7.6 mi) north of Kitzbühel as well as 3 km (1.9 mi) north of Sankt Johann in Tirol at the Kitzbühler Ache. By area, Kirchdorf is the second largest municipality in the district. The village obtained its name from an old church which was built in the 8th century. The main sources of income are agriculture and tourism.

== Geography ==
Kirchdorf lies in the Leukental valley, near St. Johann in Tirol. The parish consists of several hamlets and scattered settlements. A large part of the Wilder Kaiser mountain ridge also falls within the parish boundary. Kirchdorf is the second largest parish in Kitzbühel district by area.

=== Subdivisions ===
Bicheln, Einwall, Erpfendorf (village with its own church and school), Erpfendorf-Dorf, Erpfendorf-Wald, Fabrik, Furth, Gasteig (also with its own school), Griesenau, Habach, Haberberg, Hinterberg, Huberhöhe, Jageregg, Kaiserbachtal, Kirchdorf-Dorf, Moosen, Litzlfelden, Oberrain, Taxerau, Unteranger, Vorderhaberberg, Weng, Wohlmuting

=== Neighbouring parishes ===
Ebbs, Ellmau, Going am Wilden Kaiser, Kössen, Kufstein, St. Johann in Tirol, Sankt Ulrich am Pillersee, Schwendt, Waidring, Walchsee

== History ==
Kirchdorf takes its name from its church which is the oldest in the district. As early as the late 2nd/early 3rd century A.D. a Roman villa stood on the site of the present church; it was later destroyed in unrest during the Migration Period. By the 8th century the first church in Kirchdorf had been built on the foundations of the old villa. The first official reference of the name "Chirichdorf" was made in a book of the Tegernsee Abbey in 1107/13–1121. Until 1805 the parish of Kirchdorf was also responsible for Reit im Winkl which led to close ties between the two communities. This link was however broken when they established their own church parish.

== Population ==
Historical population
Year	Pop.	±%
1869	1,112	—
1880	1,096	−1.4%
1890	1,065	−2.8%
1900	1,110	+4.2%
1910	1,343	+21.0%
1923	1,184	−11.8%
1934	1,343	+13.4%
1939	1,843	+37.2%
1951	1,606	−12.9%
1961	1,799	+12.0%
1971	2,353	+30.8%
1981	2,746	+16.7%
1991	3,250	+18.4%
2001	3,492	+7.4%
2011	3,776	+8.1%

== Twin city ==
- Balatonföldvár, Hungary
