= Walchsee (lake) =

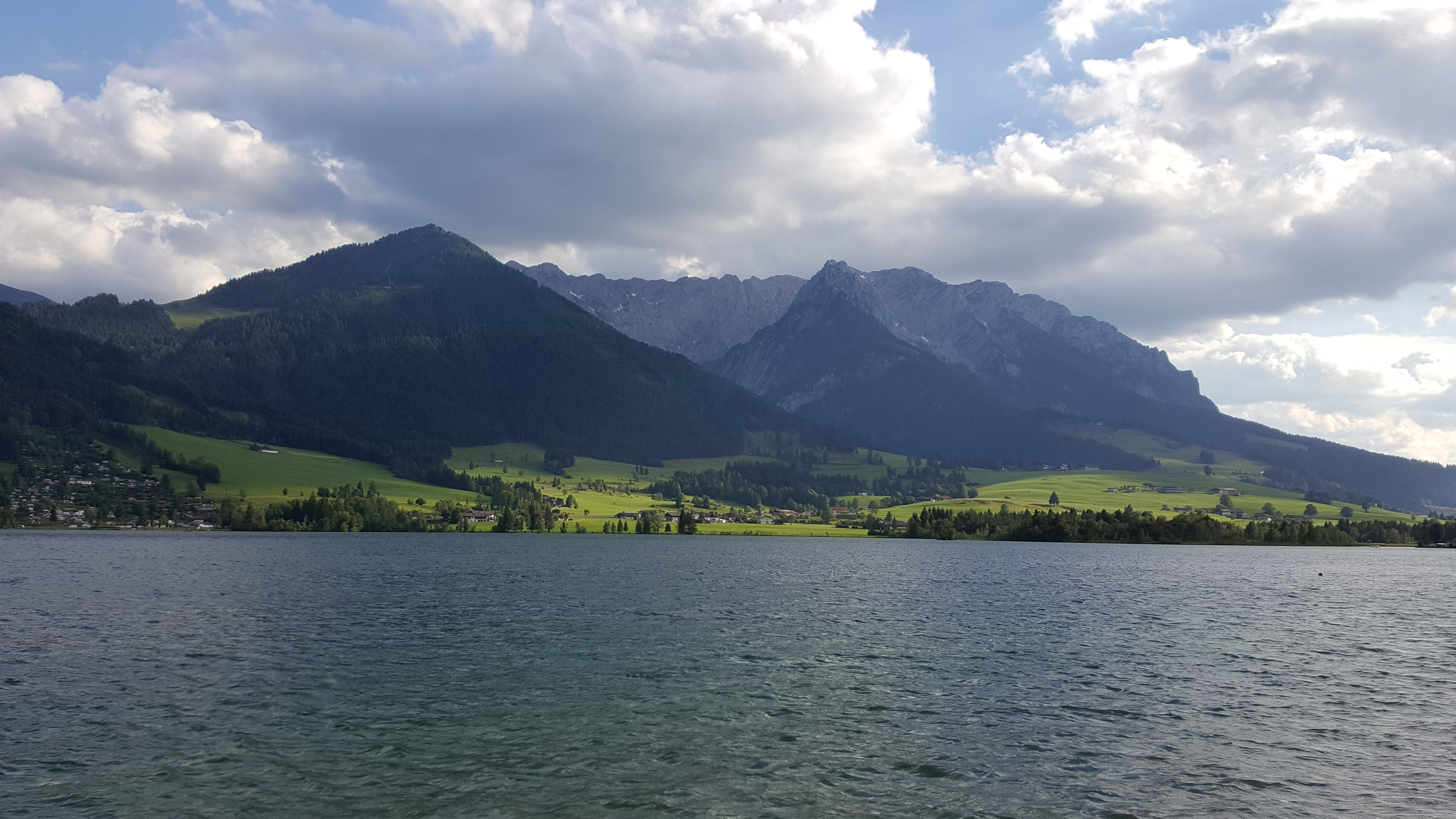
- Walchsee

- Location within Austria
- Location: Kufstein District, Tyrol, Austria
- Coordinates: 47.646°N 12.324°E
- Type: lake
- Surface area: 95.3 hectares (235 acres)
- Max. depth: 21.2 metres (70 ft)
- Water volume: 11,782,560 cubic metres (416,097,000 cu ft)

Walchsee is a lake in Kufstein District in both Walchsee and Kössen municipalities, Tyrol, Austria. The lake lies entirely within the municipality of Walchsee in the Kufstein district, but the eastern shore belongs to the municipality of Kössen in the Kitzbühel district.

Its surface area of 95.3 hectares (235 acres) makes it the fourth largest natural waterbody in the state. Its maximum depth is 21.2 metres (70 ft), and its maximum volume is 11,782,560 cubic metres (416,097,000 cu ft).

== See also ==
- List of lakes of Austria
