= Walchsee =

- Municipality
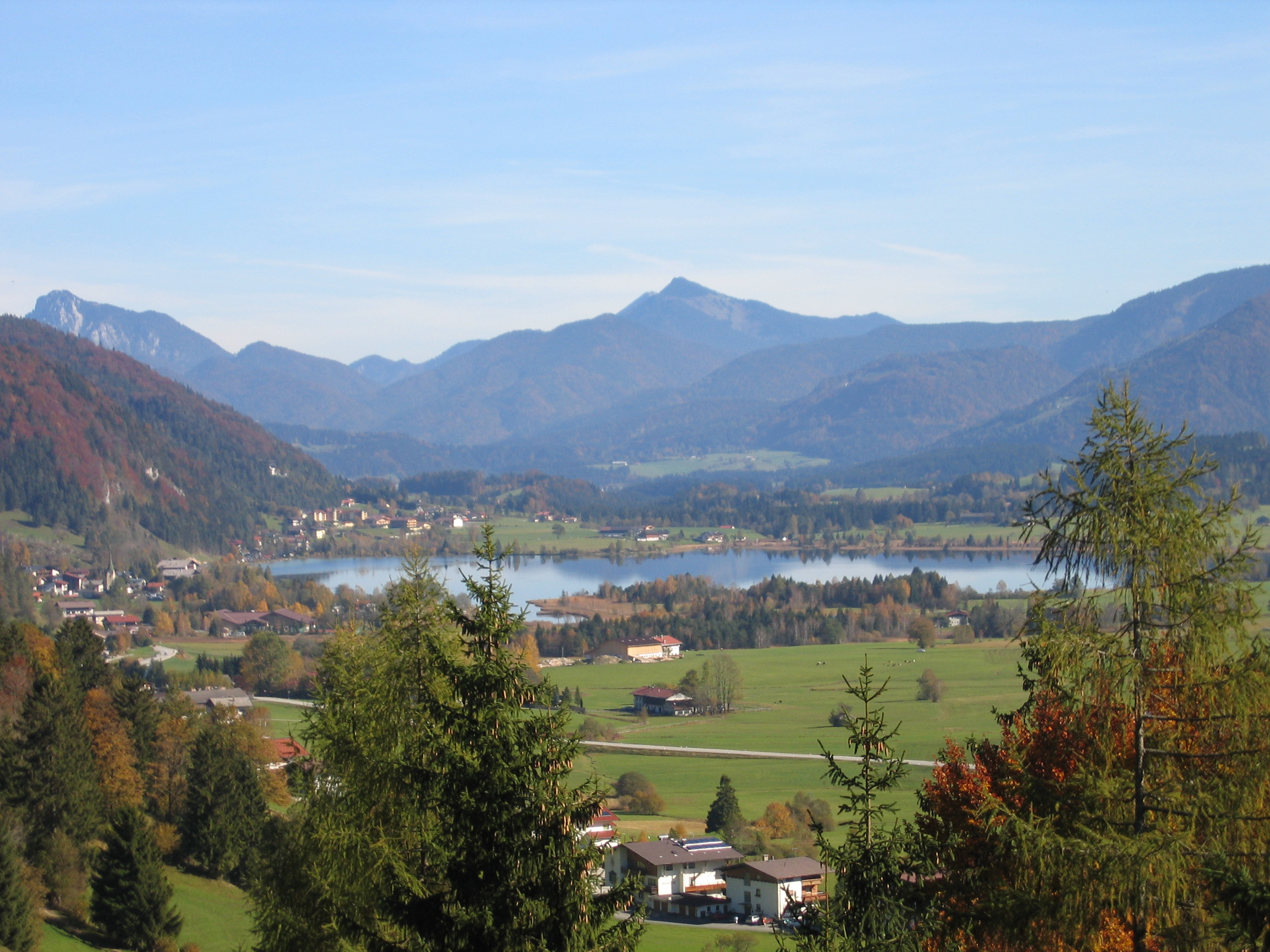
- Walchsee

- Coat of arms

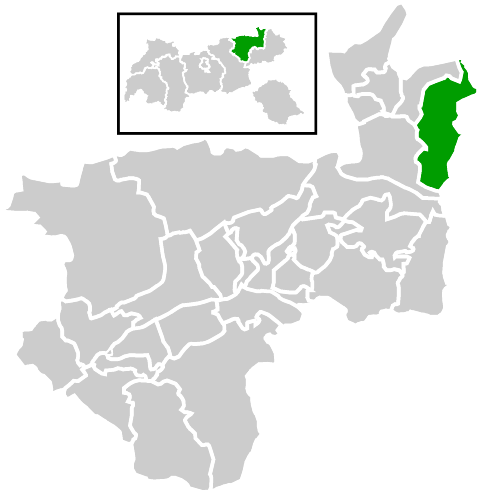
- Location within Kufstein district

- Location within Austria
- Coordinates: 47°39′04″N 12°19′07″E
- Country: Austria
- State: Tyrol
- District: Kufstein

Government
  - Mayor: Dieter Wittlinger (Gemeinsame Walchseer Liste)

Area
  - Total: 39.24 km^{2} (15.15 sq mi)
- Elevation: 658 m (2,159 ft)

Population (2021)
  - Total: 2,041
  - Density: 52.01/km^{2} (134.7/sq mi)
- Time zone: UTC+1 (CET)
  - Summer (DST): UTC+2 (CEST)
- Postal code: 6344
- Area code: 05374
- Vehicle registration: KU
- Website: www.walchsee.tirol.gv.at

Walchsee is a municipality in the Austrian state of Tyrol in the Kufstein district. It is located in the lower Inn valley and belongs to the "Kaiserwinkl" and the "Untere Schranne".

== Geography ==
Walchsee is located 18 km northeast of the city Kufstein, between the lake by the same name and the foot of the majestic Kaiser mountain range. Here is north Tyrol's largest preserved raised bog, the "Schwemm". The lake Walchsee covers an area of about 2.5 km² and its average summer temperature is 21°.

=== Borders ===
Walchsee borders two municipalities in the district of Kufstein (Ebbs, Rettenschöss) and three municipalities in the district of Kitzbühel (Kössen, Schwendt, Kirchdorf in Tirol). It also shares a border with the German municipality Aschau im Chiemgau, which belongs to the district of Rosenheim. The lowest point of Walchsee is located in Durchholzen (Schmiedtal 650 m) and the highest point is the Vordere Kesselschneid at 2,002 m.

=== Structure ===
Walchsee has 5 little districts: Durchholzen, Schwaigs, Oed, Winkl and Walchsee itself.

=== History ===
The first mention of Walchsee is in a document from Pope Eugene III from 1151, in which the possessions of the Rott Abbey (near Rosenheim) are recorded and the village of Walshe (Walchsee) is also mentioned.

=== Images ===
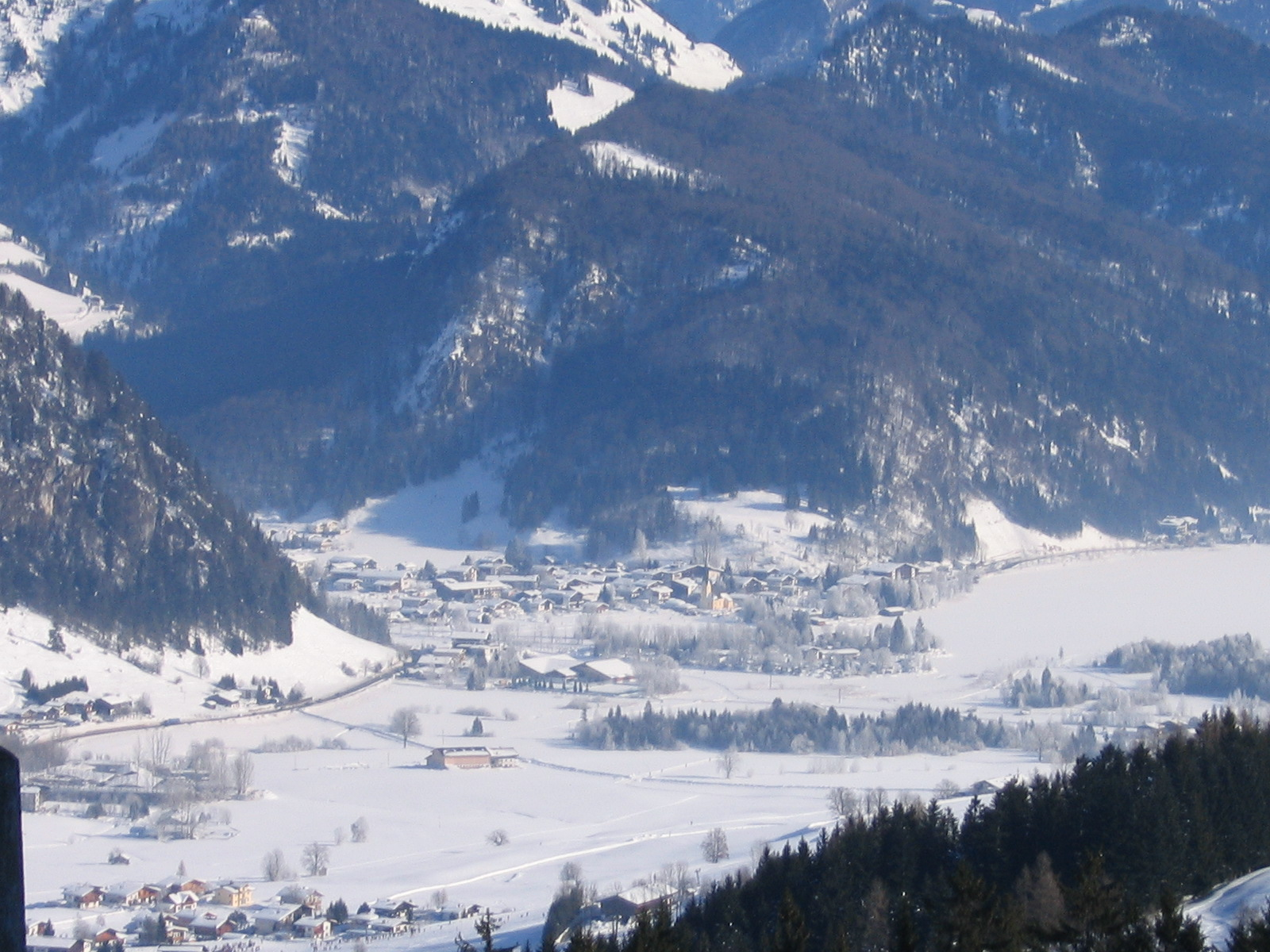
Winter in Walchsee

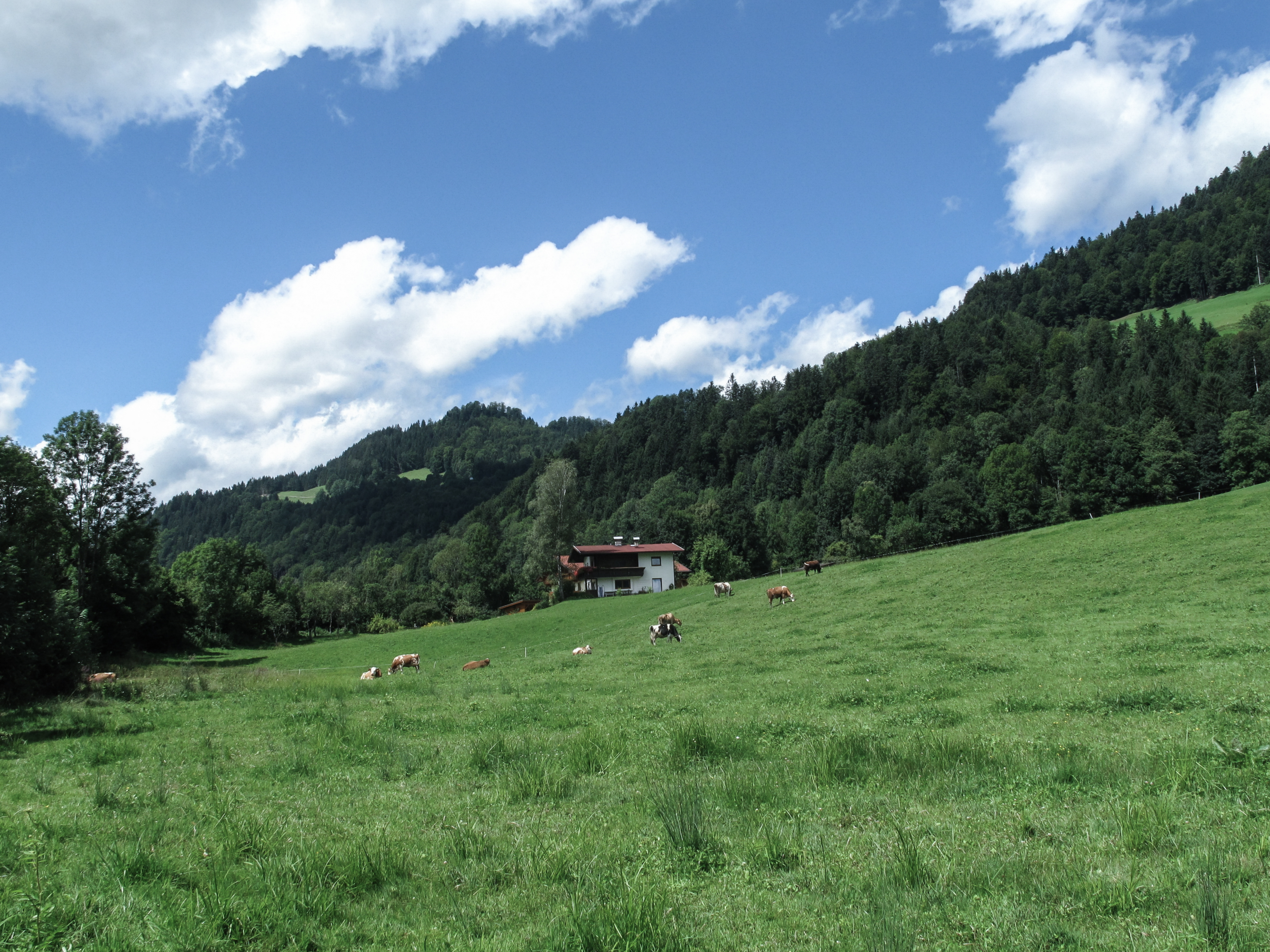
between Walchsee and Rettenschoss, panorama

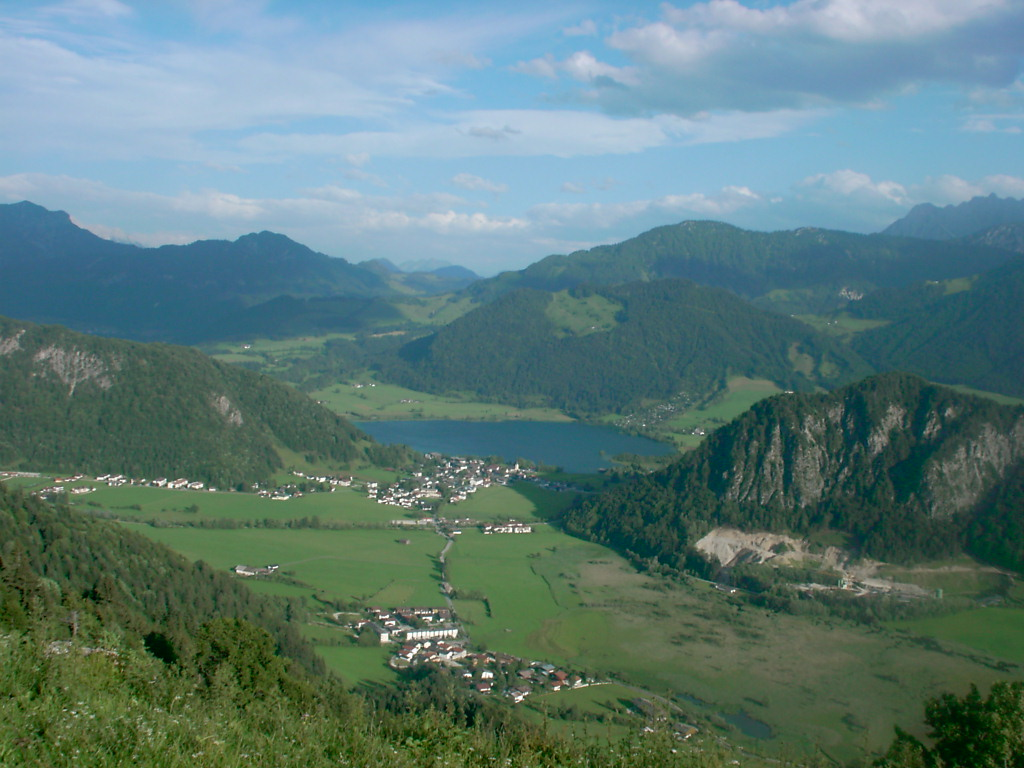
Blick vom Brennkopf Walchsee

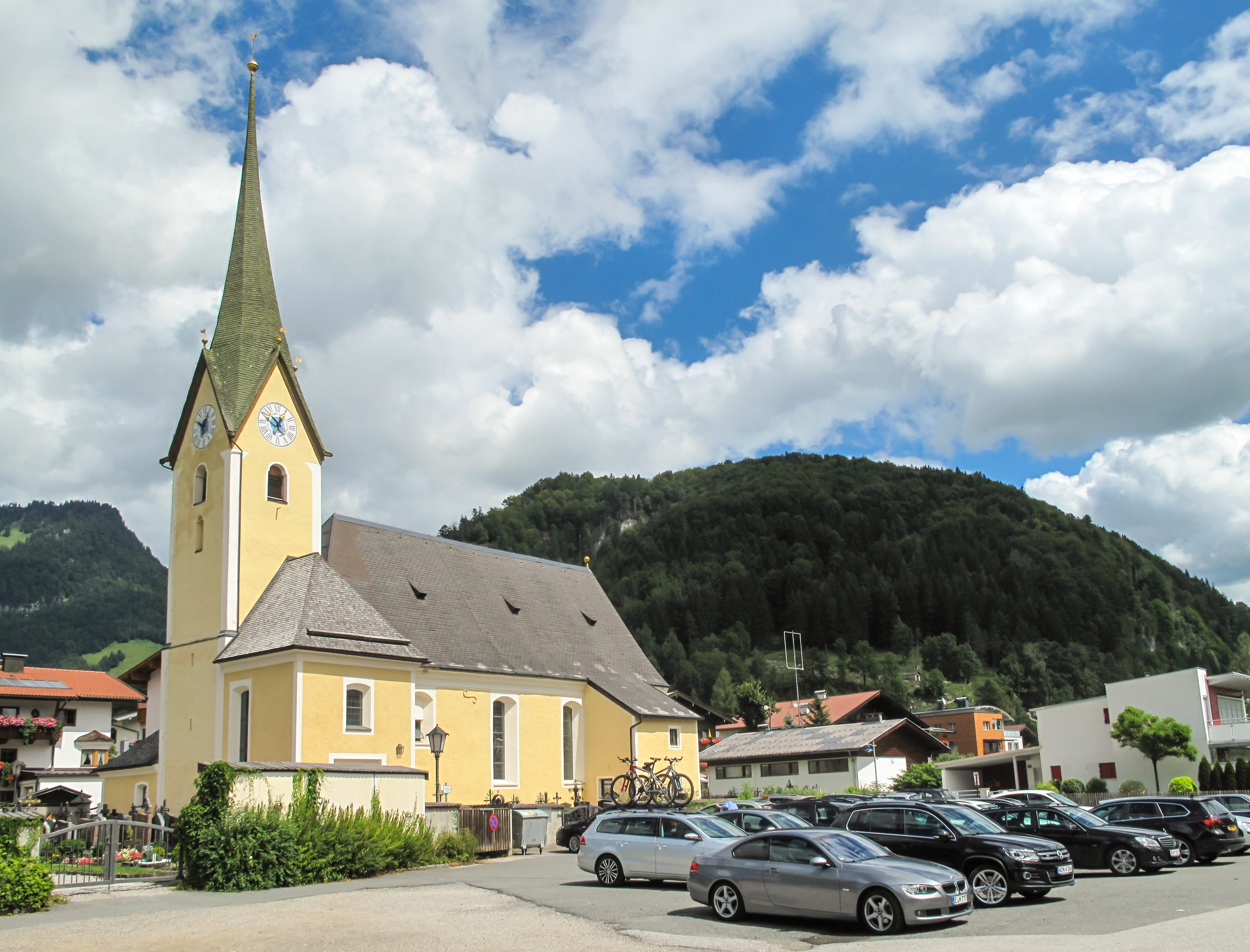
Walchsee, church: Pfarrkirche Sankt Johannes der Täufer

=== Neighbouring villages ===
Aschau im Chiemgau (D), Ebbs, Kirchdorf in Tyrol, Kössen, Rettenschöss, Schwendt

== Economy ==
=== Tourism ===
Resort facilities: 40 km of winter walking paths, 25 km of ski runs, 140 km of cross-country skiing tracks, sledding, skating etc.
