= Going am Wilden Kaiser =

- Municipality
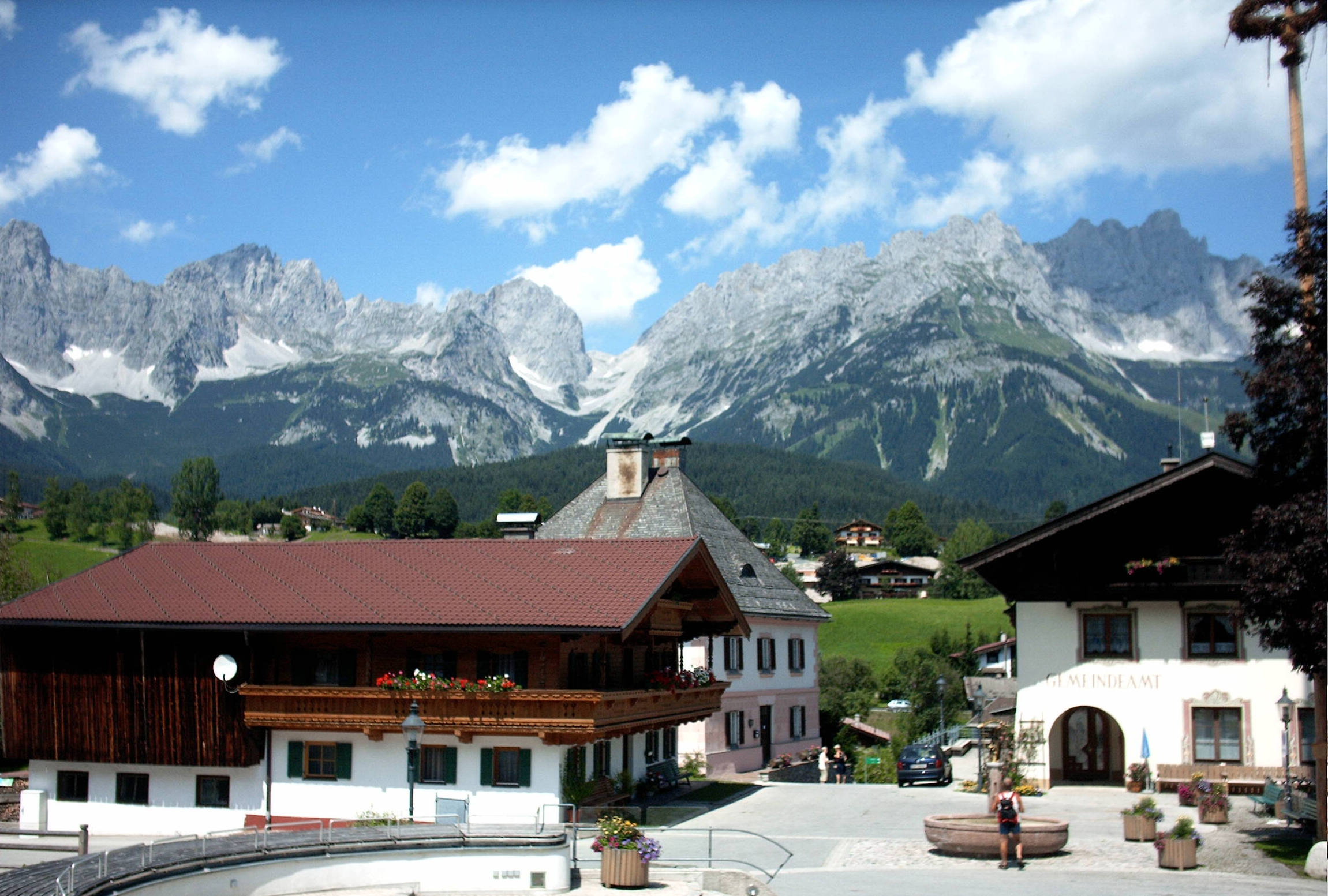

- Coat of arms

- Location within Austria
- Coordinates: 47°30′52″N 12°19′41″E
- Country: Austria
- State: Tyrol
- District: Kitzbühel

Government
  - Mayor: Alexander Hochfilzer (Gemeinsam für Going)

Area
  - Total: 20.57 km^{2} (7.94 sq mi)
- Elevation: 773 m (2,536 ft)

Population (2020)
  - Total: 1,884
  - Density: 91.59/km^{2} (237.2/sq mi)
- Time zone: UTC+1 (CET)
  - Summer (DST): UTC+2 (CEST)
- Postal code: 6353
- Area code: 05358
- Vehicle registration: KB
- Website: www.going.tirol.gv.at

Going am Wilden Kaiser is a municipality in the district of Kitzbühel in the Austrian region of Sölllandl. It is located 8.5 km northwest of Kitzbühel and 5 km west of Sankt Johann in Tirol. The village has 1,849 inhabitants and is divided into five sub-districts. Its main source of income is tourism. It is connected to the large Ski Welt skiing area by the Astbergbahn chairlift, which takes skiers rapidly from Going in the valley up to the large expanse of ski terrain on the mountainsides.

== Geography ==
Going lies west of St. Johann in Tirol between the Kitzbühel Alps in the south and the Wild Kaiser in the north in the Sölllandl. Other hamlets in the municipality are: Schwendt, Aschau, Prama, Sonnseite and Schattseite.

Municipalities neighboring Going include Ellmau, Oberndorf in Tirol; Reith bei Kitzbühel, St. Johann in Tirol; and Kirchdorf in Tirol.

== History ==
In 1160 the village was first mentioned in a deed at Baumbach Abbey as Gouwingen. In 2010 the 850th anniversary of this record was celebrated. The name is derived from a Bajuvarian nobleman, Guowo or Gauwo. This suggests it was founded by the Bavarii. However latest research show that those mentions refer to Gauing located in Traunstein (district) (Upper Bavaria). The village church is one of the most impressive rococo churches in Tyrol. It is consecrated to the Holy Cross and the martyr, Laurentius. Its architect was Andrä Hueber and the frescoist was Matthias Kirchner, both from Kitzbühel. The altars and holy figures were carved by Going sculptor, Thomas Blieml. There is an interesting madonna in the altar niche of the left-hand altar, carved around 1480.

Copper and silver were mined at Rehrobichl between Going and Oberndorf in the first quarter of the 16th century. The miners (Bergknappen) lived in the hamlet of Prama. Prama is Celtic and means "the place where the blackberries (Brombeeren) grow." This is a clue that it was a Celtic settlement. The Celts mined copper and silver in this region in around 800 B. C. The mine was closed around 1773. In its heyday, about 12,000 kg of copper and 7,000 kg of silver were won annually. The smelter was in the hamlet of Bärenstätten von St. Johann. The deepest, vertical mineshaft was about 880 metres deep.

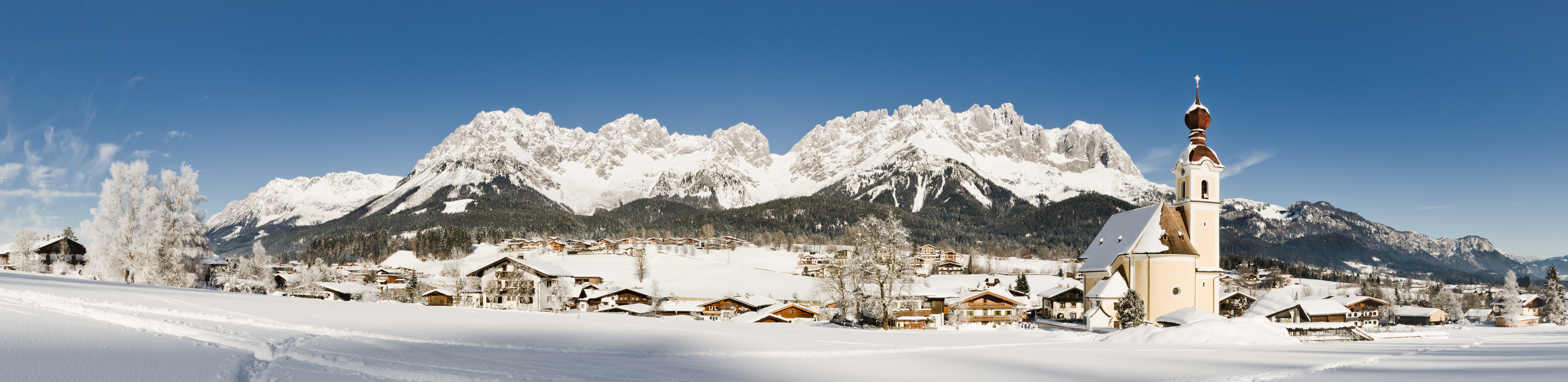
Panorama of Going in winter

Historical population
Year	Pop.	±%
1869	739	—
1880	820	+11.0%
1890	751	−8.4%
1900	738	−1.7%
1910	664	−10.0%
1923	752	+13.3%
1934	825	+9.7%
1939	867	+5.1%
1951	918	+5.9%
1961	966	+5.2%
1971	1,152	+19.3%
1981	1,180	+2.4%
1991	1,449	+22.8%
2001	1,730	+19.4%
2011	1,851	+7.0%
2018	1,849	−0.1%

== Economy ==
Today, in addition to many handicraft, industrial and trading businesses, Going is dominated by agriculture and the winter and summer tourist industries.

- Summer activities and facilities: hiking trails, climbing, mountaineering, natural bathing lake with the longest open-air water slide in Tyrol, beach volleyball, tennis courts and halls, squash hall, 27 hole golf course, riding hall and bridleways, cycle paths, asphaltstockbahnen, Zimmergewehr firing range, open air climbing wall, children's and family programmes, moorland experience world, etc.
- Winter activities and facilities: Skiwelt Wilder Kaiser-Brixental, Going-Ellmau ski area, cross-country skiing trails, toboggan runs, winter hiking trails, tennis hall, squash hall, ice rink, Zimmergewehr firing range, asphaltstockhalle, indoor climbing wall.

== Personalities ==
- Johann von Sieberer (1830-1914), insurance general inspector and philanthropist
