= Andrea Fischer (scientist) =

Austrian glaciologist

- Born: September 3, 1973 (age 52); St. Johann in Tirol
- Education: University of Graz; University of Innsbruck
- Scientific career
- Workplaces: Austrian Academy of Sciences; University of Innsbruck
- Thesis: Icedynamics of Vatnajökull, Iceland, investigated by means of ERS SAR interferometry (2002)

Andrea Fischer (born September 3, 1973) is an Austrian glaciologist, Professor and Vice Director of the Institute of Interdisciplinary Mountain Research of the Austrian Academy of Sciences. She was named as the Austrian Scientist of the Year in 2023.

== Early life and education ==
Fischer is from St. Johann in Tirol and grew up in Salzburg. She studied physics and environmental sciences as an undergraduate at the University of Graz. In 2003 she obtained her PhD in the field of remote sensing of snow and ice at the University of Innsbruck. Here she used European Remote-Sensing Satellite synthetic-aperture radar interferograms to monitor surges of glaciers in the Vatnajökull ice cap. Her research indicated that the glacier's surge cycle lasts for several years, with an early stage characterised by slowly increasing motion and more distinct velocity changes during the final two years of the surge cycle. She was a postdoctoral research at the University of Innsbruck and the Commission for Geophysical Research of the Austrian Academy of Sciences, where she focussed on glaciology, hydrology and geophysics.

== Research and career ==
In 2010 Fischer was made a Senior Scientist at the Institute for Mountain Research at the Austrian Academy of Sciences. Fischer studies the melting of Alpine glaciers. She leads the Human-Environment Relationships, High Mountains at the Austrian Academy of Sciences (ÖAW). She has studied the dynamics of climate change on the surface and subsurface of glaciers. Her research revealed that the glaciers are mainly eroded. To understand the impact of climate change, Fischer has monitored the mass balance of various glaciers. The mass balance is the overall balance of the mass gained by snow, and lost to melting (both at the surface and under the floating ice) and calving (i.e. when producing icebergs). Fischer has monitored the mass balance of Hallstätter Glacier, Mullwitzkees (Großvenediger) and Jamtalferner (Silvretta). In October 2021 during a fieldwork trip to Jamtalferner glacier, she and her colleagues discovered a large cave in the middle of it, which is unusual. This glacier has been studied since 1892 and she and her colleagues had been measuring the ice every one to three weeks, which was rapidly melting. The cave was gone by June 2022.

In 2022 she found a small, frozen chamois ("goat-antelope") in the Gepatsch Ferner, which she believed was 500 years old.

== Awards and honours ==
- 2006 Herta Firnberg Stipendium
- 2013 Austrian of the Year
- 2020 Messe Krakau
- 2020 Falling Walls Finalist
- 2023 Austrian Scientist of the Year

== Select publications ==
- Michael Zemp; Holger Frey; Isabelle Gärtner-Roer; et al. (2015). "Historically unprecedented global glacier decline in the early 21st century". Journal of Glaciology. 61 (228): 745–762. Bibcode:2015JGlac..61..745Z. doi:10.3189/2015jog15j017. ISSN 0022-1430. Wikidata Q57736133.
- M. Zemp; E. Thibert; M. Huss; et al. (6 August 2013). "Reanalysing glacier mass balance measurement series". The Cryosphere. 7 (4): 1227–1245. Bibcode:2013TCry....7.1227Z. doi:10.5194/tc-7-1227-2013. ISSN 1994-0416. Wikidata Q57736135.
- Ika Djukic; Sebastian Kepfer-Rojas; Inger Kappel Schmidt; et al. (July 2018). "Early stage litter decomposition across biomes". Science of the Total Environment. 628–629: 1369–1394. Bibcode:2018ScTEn.628.1369D. doi:10.1016/j.scitotenv.2018.01.012. ISSN 0048-9697. PMID 30045558. Wikidata Q56937613.

== Personal life ==
Fischer is a former Austrian ice climbing champion.
