= Egger (company) =

Austrian manufacturing company

Fritz EGGER
- Company type: Public
- Industry: Wood, Manufacturing
- Founded: 1961
- Headquarters: St. Johann in Tirol, Austria
- Products: MFC, MDF, OSB, Laminates, Flooring, Decorative Faced Boards, Building Products
- Revenue: € 4.13 billion (2023/2024)
- Number of employees: >11,000
- Website: http://www.egger.com/

EGGER is a global family company founded in 1961 in Tyrol, Austria, where it is currently based. The company produces wood-based panel products. EGGER has 22 production sites globally located in Europe (Austria, Germany, France, Italy, Poland, United Kingdom, Romania, Russia and Turkey) and the Americas (Argentina and the United States). It currently has 25 sales offices worldwide (located in France, Belgium, Denmark, Italy, Switzerland, Slovenia, Lithuania, Ukraine, China, Japan, India, Chile, Taiwan, Australia, Romania, Croatia, Czech Republic, Hungary, Poland, Serbia, Bulgaria, Turkey, Russia, Belarus and Argentina). In 2006 the company invested €210 million in the construction of a new production site located in Rădăuți, Romania with a capacity of 600,000 cubic meters of melamine faced chipboard. At the Romanian site the company operates a combined heat and electricity cogeneration power station with a capacity of 40.5 MW. In 2017, the company invested $700 million for the construction of a new production facility, Egger's first manufacturing plant in the United States, located in Lexington, North Carolina. Ground broke in 2018, and production started in September 2020.

== Criticism ==
Following Russia’s invasion of Ukraine in 2022, the Austrian wood product company Egger was criticized for maintaining its operations in Russia despite international sanctions. In October 2022, Egger expanded its presence by establishing a new subsidiary, WOODPRODUCT VOSTOK ASSET MANAGEMENT LLC, in the Ivanovo region, signaling ongoing business interests in the Russian market.

== See also ==
- Melamine faced chipboard
- Medium-density fibreboard
- Laminate
- Laminate flooring
