= St. Johann in Tirol =

Market town and municipality in Tyrol, Austria

St. Johann in Tirol Sainihåns
- Municipality
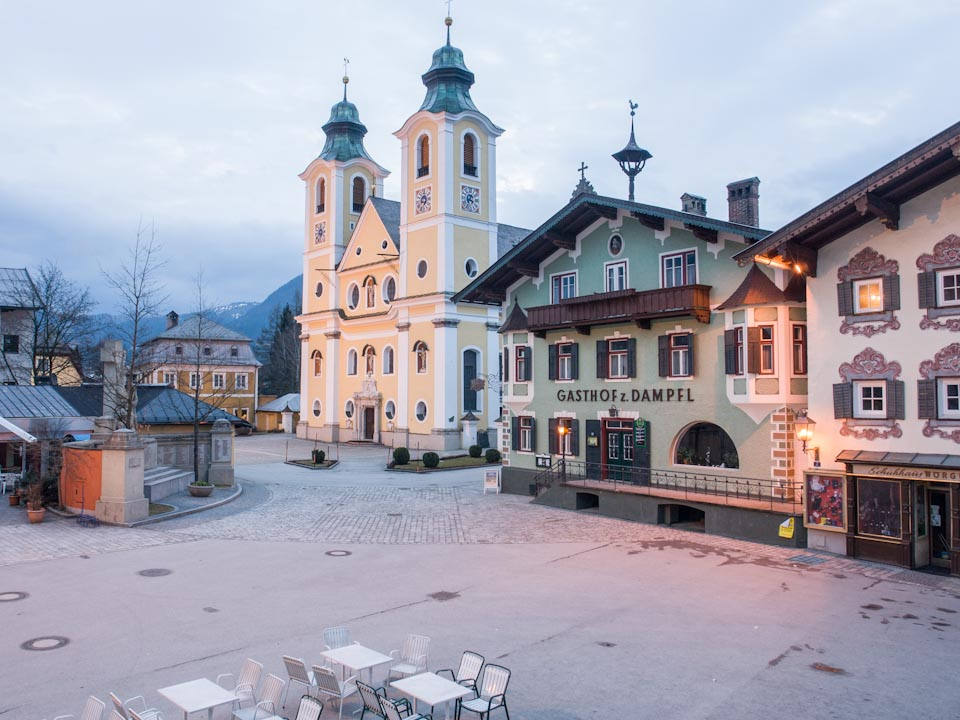
- Market square with the Dekanatspfarrkirche Maria Himmelfahrt

- Flag Coat of arms

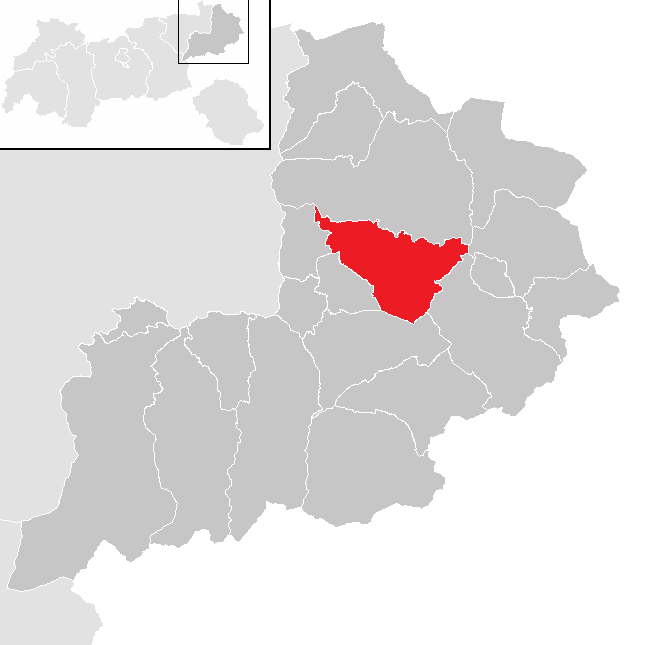
- Area of the municipality (red) within the Kitzbühel district (dark gray) of Tyrol (light gray)

- Location within Austria Location within Tyrol, Austria Location within Europe
- Coordinates: 47°31′21″N 12°25′32″E
- Country: Austria
- State: Tyrol
- District: Kitzbühel

Government
  - Mayor: Stefan Seiwald (ÖVP)

Area
  - Total: 59.15 km^{2} (22.84 sq mi)
- Elevation: 659 m (2,162 ft)
- Highest elevation: 2,231 m (7,320 ft)

Population (2022-01-01)
  - Total: 9,750
  - Density: 165/km^{2} (427/sq mi)
- Time zone: UTC+1 (CET)
  - Summer (DST): UTC+2 (CEST)
- Postal code: 6380
- Area code: +43 5352
- Vehicle registration: KB
- Website: st.johann.tirol

Sankt Johann in Tirol, called Sainihåns (German pronunciation: [zãɪ̯nɪ'ɦåns]) in the local dialect, is a market municipality in the Kitzbühel district of Tyrol, Austria. In the regional ductus, the last syllable of the name is stressed as Sankt yo-Hahn' (German pronunciation: [zaŋkt joˈhan]).

== Geography ==
St. Johann in Tyrol is located in the centre of the Leukental in the Tyrolean Unterland. The municipality is situated in a wide glacial cirque, intersected by the Leukental in a broadly north-south direction. Northwest of St. Johann are the Wilder Kaiser ('wild emperor'), the southern range of the Kaisergebirge ('emperor mountains') in the Northern Limestone Alps. To the east is the mountain group of the Loferer and Leoganger Steinberge. Extending to the southeast is the valley of the Fieberbrunner Ache. In the south is the Kitzbüheler Horn, a nearly 2,000-metre (6,600 ft) mountain that sits at the centre of the Kitzbühel district and is part of the Kitzbühel Alps.

Due to its location in a valley basin, St. Johann in Tyrol is largely spared from the Alpenföhn storms that plague the Inntal to the east-northeast, but gets extremely abundant snowfalls due to its location on the southern, windward side of the Wilder Kaiser. The town centre sits at an altitude of 660 metres (2,170 ft) above sea level. The municipal area covers an area of 5,915 hectares (14,620 acres) and the highest elevation within the municipality is the Maukspitze in the Wilder Kaiser with a height of 2,231 metres (7,320 ft) above sea level.

The Großache, the principal river of the Leukental, flows through the centre of St. Johann in Tirol; the section flowing north from Kitzbühel to St. Johann is known as the Kitzbüheler Ache. Several tributaries join the Großache within the municipality of St. Johann: the Reither Ache (called the Aschauer Ache in its upper course) joins the main stream south of the town proper and the Fieberbrunner Ache joins to the north of the town centre. The Großache ultimately empties into the Chiemsee in Bavaria as the Tiroler Achen.

The town's train station serves as a regional transport hub and several federal highways (Bundesstraßen) intersect in the municipality. The Loferer Straße (B 178) runs from west to northeast through the municipality. Travelling west from St. Johann, the Loferer Straße leads into the Sölllandl valley and region via Going am Wilden Kaiser and, travelling northeast, it continues through the Leukental towards Kirchdorf in Tirol. The Kössener Straße (B 176) branches from the Loferer Straße to extend north of St. Johann into the Kohlental towards Schwendt via the Huberhöhe mountain pass. Following along the Fieberbrunner Ache, the Hochkönigstraße (B 164) branches from the Loferer Straße to run southeast from St. Johann towards Fieberbrunn.

=== Subsidiary settlements ===
The municipality of St. Johann in Tirol includes the Weiler (hamlets) and Dörfer (villages) of Almdorf, Apfeldorf, Bärnstetten, Berglehen, Fricking, Hinterkaiser, Mitterndorf, Niederhofen, Oberhofen, Reitham, Rettenbach, Scheffau, Sperten, Taxa, Weiberndorf, Weitau, Winkl Schattseite, and Winkl Sonnseite.

=== Population ===
On the day of the census in 2001 (final result in 2004) St. Johann had 7,959 inhabitants. The population of the town is steadily increasing; in 2004 it was growing at 1.8 per cent. Since autumn 2007 St. Johann in Tirol has been the most populous municipality in the district of Kitzbühel.

Historical population

Year	Pop.	±% p.a.
1869	2,049	—
1880	2,256	+0.88%
1890	2,329	+0.32%
1900	2,475	+0.61%
1910	2,906	+1.62%
1923	2,865	−0.11%
1934	3,193	+0.99%
1939	3,420	+1.38%

Year	Pop.	±% p.a.
1951	4,274	+1.87%
1961	4,713	+0.98%
1971	5,973	+2.40%
1981	6,477	+0.81%
1991	7,180	+1.04%
2001	7,961	+1.04%
2008	8,698	+1.27%
2010	8,790	+0.53%

Source: Statistik Austria

== History ==
St. Johann is situated in the Leukental, which extends from Jochberg to the Streichen close to the Bavarian border. This region was already settled in the 4th century BC by a Celtic tribe, the Ambisontiers, who pursued copper mining in the surrounding mountains.

In 15 BC the Romans conquered the Eastern Alpine region and the Leukental became part of the Roman province of Noricum. Following the downfall of the West Roman Empire in 476 AD the region went to the Duchy of Bavaria in the 7th century in the wake of the European migrations and as result of the settlement of the Germanic tribe of the Bavarii.

In the following centuries the nobles of the House of Liuchinger, after whom the Leukental is named, established a county in the valley. The Liuchingers lived at Leukenstein Castle, which is located at the foot of the Niederkaiser. The exact site of the castle, which was also the judicial seat for the county, is no longer known today, but is recalled by the farm name of Burgwiesen ("castle meadows"). Following the extinction of the Liuchingers around 1170, their county ended up in the hands of the Falkensteins, but this noble family also died out after just 70 years and the county in the Leukental was subsequently ruled by officials representing the Bavarian dukes.

In the 8th century (probably before 738), the missionaries built a Catholic church in the region of St. Johann, which was dedicated to St. John the Evangelist, from which the town's name was derived. The church of St. Johannes was first mentioned in a document in the year 1150.

In 1446, the bishops of Chiemsee were given the responsibility of the parish of St. Johann, from which time onwards it became their summer residence.

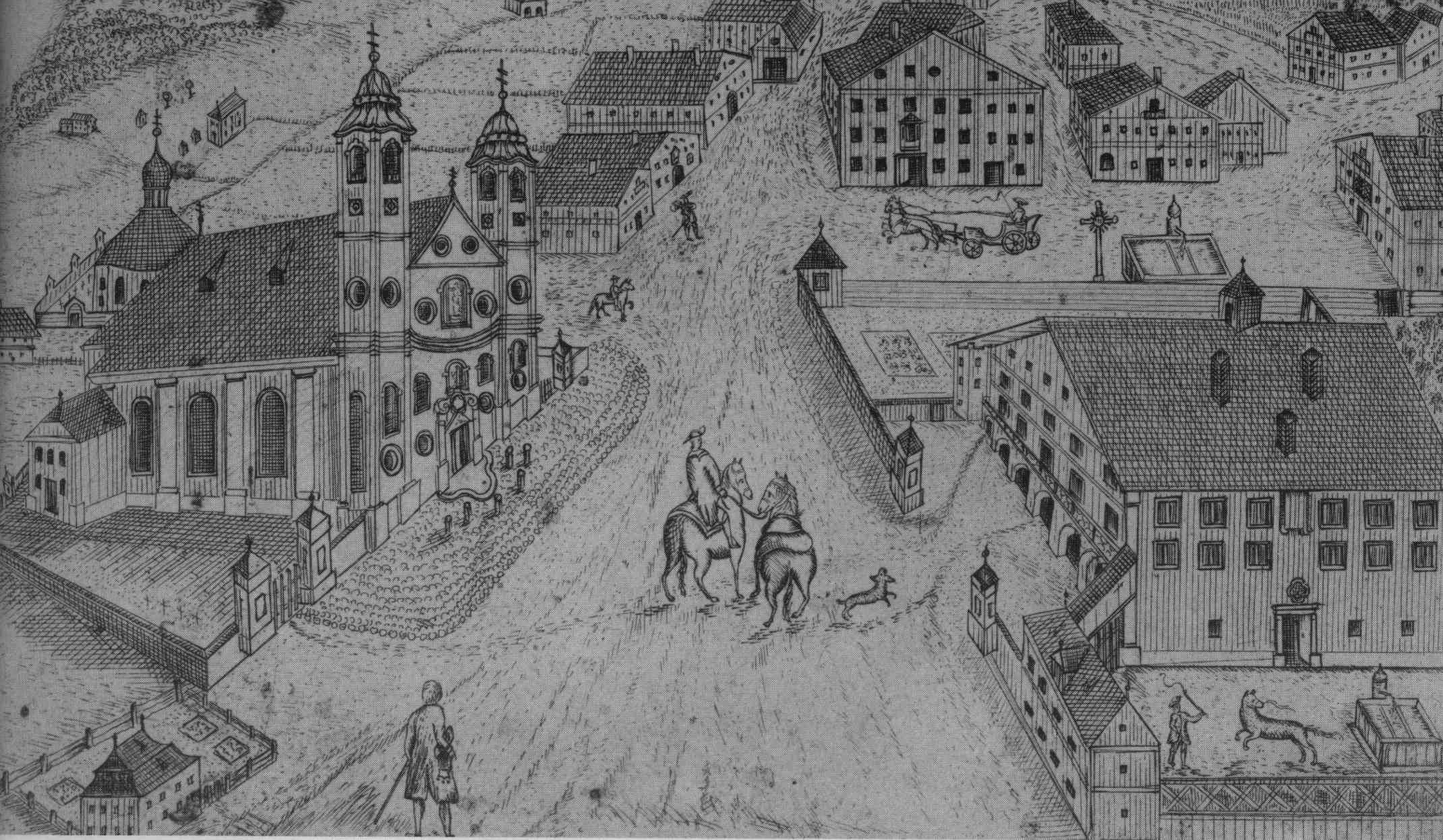
Engraving of St. Johann in Tirol in 1750

The opening of the copper and silver mines in 1540 increased the wealth of St. Johann. The mines were located in the small hills, known as Rerobichl close to Oberndorf, which belonged to St. Johann. In the 17th century the Heilig-Geist-Schacht ("Holy Ghost Shaft") was the deepest shaft in the world, over 780 metres (2,559 ft) deep.

The mining of copper and silver continued until the 18th century. In 1875, the construction of the Gisela Railway linked St. Johann to the international railway network, with the result that the economy boomed and tourism began to take hold.

=== 20th century ===
In 1927, Oberndorf and St. Johann split and from this time onwards Oberndorf became a separate parish. In 1954, St. Johann received its own Coat of Arms; in 1956, St. Johann reached the elevated status of a market town.

== Politics ==
=== Parish Council ===
The parish council (Gemeinderat or Ortsparlament) comprises 19 members, the Bürgermeister acting as chairman.

The council is made up as follows (2022-2028):

- Mayor's list (St. Johann People's Party) (Bürgermeisterliste - LISTE 1): 10 seats
- St. Johann's Social Democrats (St. Johanner Sozialdemokraten - SPÖ): 5 seats
- Party-free for St. Johann (Parteifrei für St. Johann - FREI; former FPÖ members): 2 seats
- Greens St. Johann in Tirol (Grüne St. Johann in Tirol - GRUENE): 1 seat
- The St. Johann Freedom Party members (Die St. Johanner Freiheitlichen - FPÖ): 1 seat

=== Parish board ===
The St. Johann parish board consists of seven members, proportional to the parish council. It is chaired by the Bürgermeister who is directly elected by the villagers of St. Johann. The two vice Bürgermeisters are chosen by the council.

- Bürgermeister: Mag. Stefan Seiwald (ÖVP), since 2012
- 1st vice Bürgermeister: Hubert Almberger (ÖVP)
- 2nd vice Bürgermeister: Peter Wallner (SPÖ)

=== Coat of arms ===
On 13 May 1954 the Tyrolean state government granted the following coat of arms to the municipality of St. Johann in Tirol:

In a green and red vertically-divided shield are, on the right, an inverted, silver ibex horn and, on the left, a gold bishop's crozier.

The shield bears the colours of the old flag of the court, whose first seat was in St. Johann before 1271. The ibex horn commemorates the "nobles of Velben" (Edlen von Velben) who lived near St. Johann in the 13th and 14th centuries. The bishop's crozier recalls that the village used to be a summer residence for the bishops of Chiemsee.

=== Communal membership ===
- Climate Alliance parish since July 1997.

=== Twinned towns ===
- Redford, Michigan, United States
- Fuldabrück, Germany
- Rovaniemi, Finland
- Valeggio sul Mincio, Italy

== Economy ==
Tourism and the restaurant trade are amongst the most important branches of the economy in the area. With approximately 520,000 overnight stays per year, roughly evenly split between summer and winter, St. Johann is one of the major tourist resorts in the Tyrol. Its holiday infrastructure ranges from hotels to campsites and from restaurants to discothèques.

In recent decades, St. Johann has experienced an economic boom in trade, services and light industry and it has become the shopping centre for the district of Kitzbühel. Many new firms have settled here, especially along the B 178 federal road, where they benefit from its central location. In addition, the opening of a pedestrian zone in the 1990s has improved the town centre, which receives an average of 20,000 visitors per day.

Several firms are based in St. Johann, such as the headquarters of the Fritz Egger GmbH & Co, one of the best-known chip board manufacturers in Europe.

Today, the region around St. Johann in Tirol is one of the agricultural centres of Tyrol, despite its harsh climate and heavy precipitation. Agriculture in the wide basin of the St. Johann bowl has a great tradition as the former breadbasket of Tyrol and, even today, farming continues to play an important role.

A relatively large number (for the Tyrol) of farms are established in the wide, level basin and on its fairly gently (with a few exceptions) slopes. According to Statistik Austria about a third of the farms form the main source of income. These primary income farms use rather more than half the agricultural and forested land in the municipality.

St. Johann in Tirol is an important tourist centre with impressive ski-slopes and related facilities. The ski resorts are especially populous starting after Christmas into early January. It is also popular in summer, especially with British, Irish and German tourists. Located near the Wilder Kaiser mountains, the Kitzbühler Horn dominates the town. It is well served by ski lifts and cable car.

== Infrastructure ==
=== Transport ===
St. Johann is a major traffic junction, to which the following roads are connected: B 178 - Loferer Straße; B 164 - Hochkönig Straße; B 176 - Kössener Straße; B 161 - Pass Thurn Straße. European route E641, which connects Wörgl with Salzburg, passes through St. Johann in Tirol, intersecting here with highway B161 to Mittersill.

The market town also has an express train station on the route of the Giselabahn, which is also called the Salzburg-Tyrol Railway and has access to the international railway network to Salzburg, Innsbruck and to Munich via Wörgl.

In addition there is an airport for light aircraft and gliders, airfield (ICAO Code LOIJ), used by light aircraft, parachutists and gliders: runway length 645 m or 2,116 ft, radio frequency 120,350 MHz, 47°31.2′N 12°26.9′E, 670 m (2,198 ft) altitude. It is the second largest airport in Tyrol.

The distance between St. Johann and Salzburg is 65 km (40 mi), between St. Johann and Innsbruck 100 km (62 mi), and between St. Johann and Munich 125 km (78 mi).

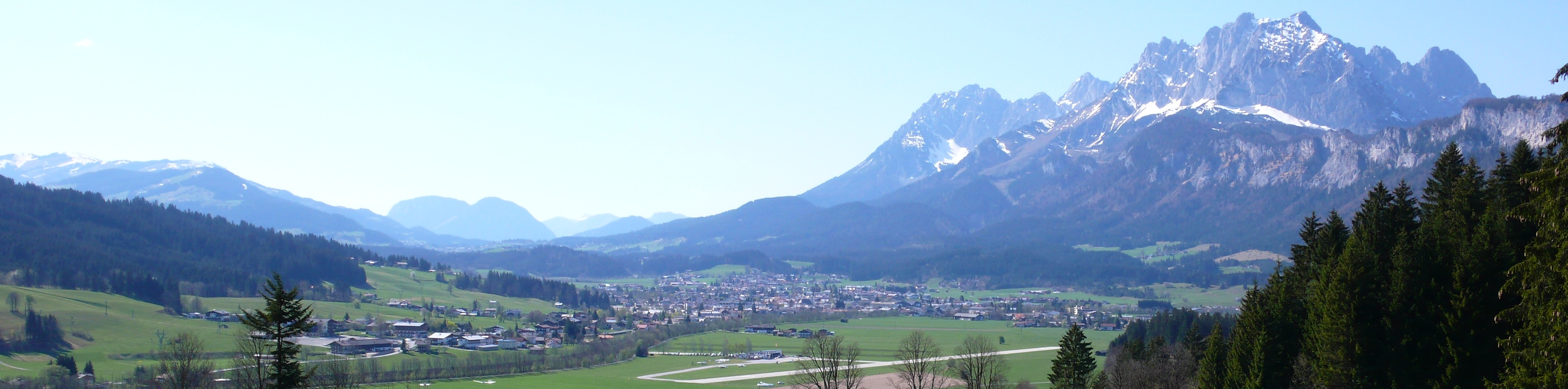
Panorama of St. Johann in Tirol. (Winter)-(Spring)

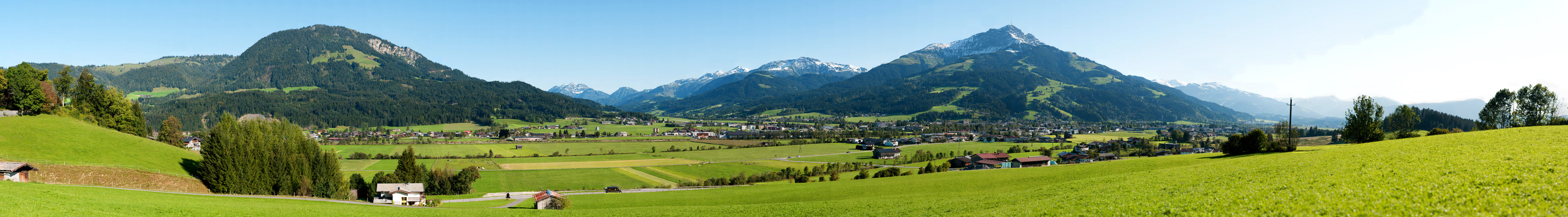
St. Johann in Tirol

=== Public Services ===
In St. Johann there are some important public services, like the district hospital, the Wintersteller army barracks and the Military Supply Centre West for the Armed Forces based in the west of Austria.

Additionally, you can find the following institutions in St. Johann: the District Forest Inspector, the District Administration for Agriculture, the Road Maintenance Department, the nursing home in St. Johann, the health and social care service and the police department.

=== Water supply and waste disposal ===
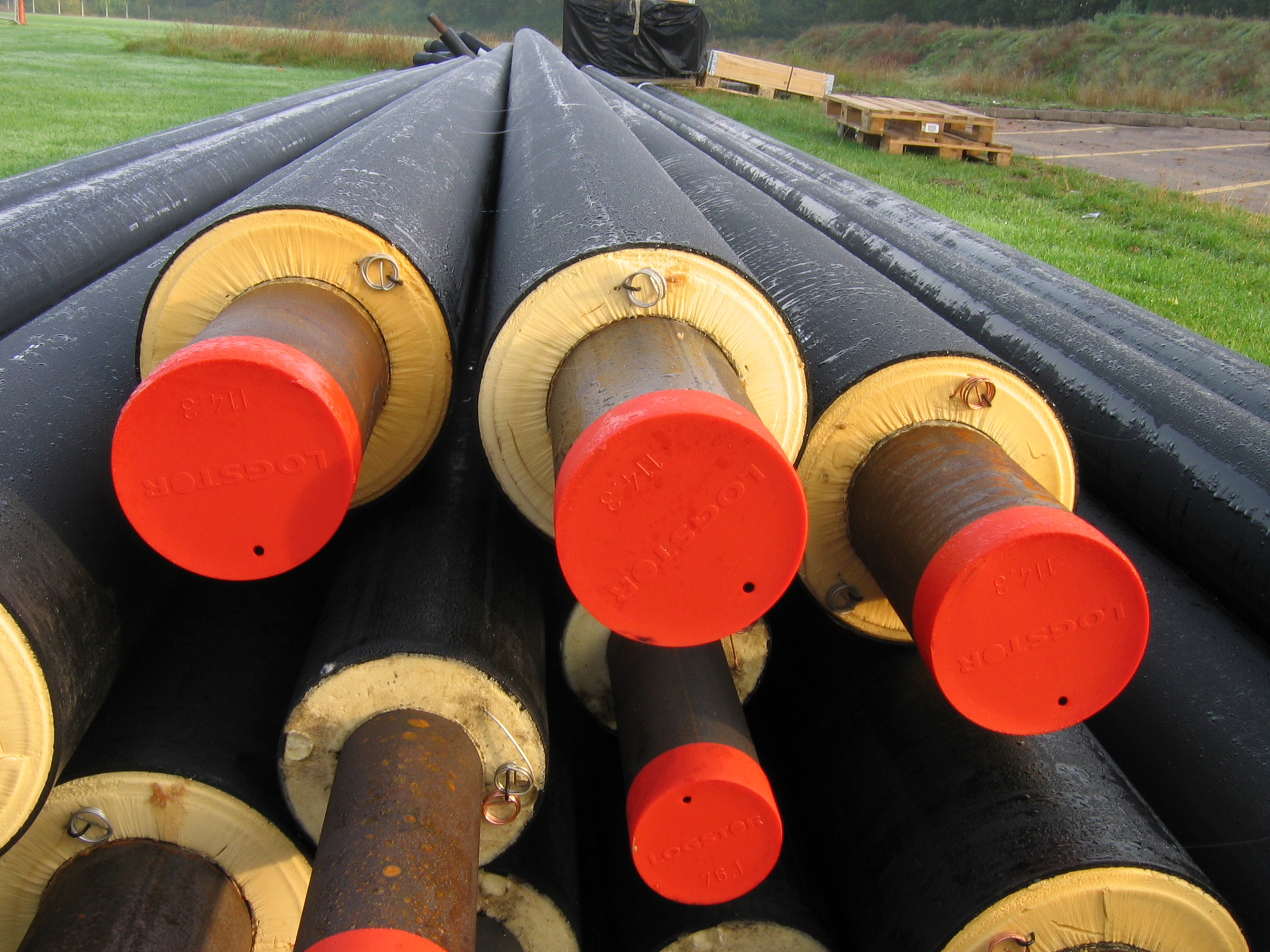
District heating pipes as plastic-sheathed composite tube by Logstor

The market town has water supply, sewage and waste disposal systems that are organised by the parish council. In addition to electricity and natural gas there has also been an environmentally friendly district heating system since the end of 2008 which supplies the largest buildings in the village.

Since December 2007 The St. Johann Village Heating Company (Ortswärme St. Johann in Tirol GmbH) has supplied households, firms and public institutions in St. Johann in Tirol with district heating. The firm is 74% owned by the parish of St. Johann in Tirol and 26% by the firm of Fritz Egger. The head office is in Bahnhofstraße 5, in the parish office. The heating company does not have its own energy generation with the exception of backup and peak-load boilers in the centre of the village. The energy is generated by the Egger factory from waste heat and biomass in conjunction with an absorption heat pump and is transferred at the boundary of the factory site into the district heating network. At the end of 2009 around 400 buildings and 1,300 households in St. Johann were heated by district heating. These include the district hospital, the barracks, the schools, traders, single and multi-family homes. A total of about 28 km (17 mi) of routing, or 56 km (35 mi) (double) of piping has been laid. In 2009, 29 gigawatt-hours (100 TJ) of heating was purchased, that corresponds to an oil consumption of about 3.4 million litres (900 thousand US gallons) per year. In the medium term the introduction of district heating in St. Johann will save about 12,000 tonnes of carbon dioxide annually in the village centre. To read the heat meters and to visualize the individual house systems, an optical fibre was laid as part of the installation of the heating district network.

=== Education ===
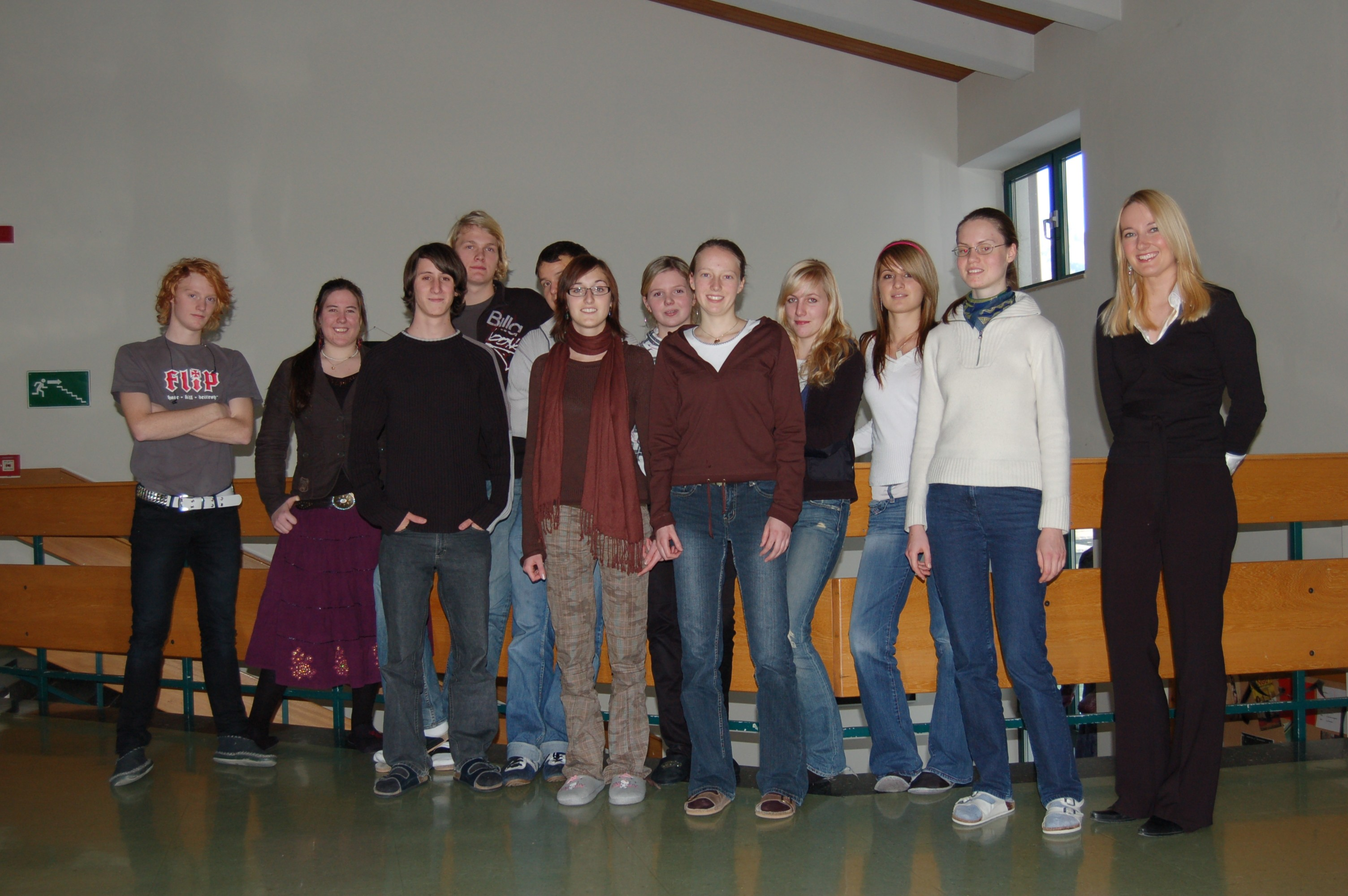
text translated by the Vocational English group of the local Grammar School, the BG/BORG

- 1 Grammar School
- 1 Institution of Higher Education for Tourism
- 1 Agricultural School
- 1 Music School
- 1 Polytechnic Institute
- 2 Secondary Schools
- 2 Elementary Schools
- 1 Special Needs Educational Centre
- 1 Montessori School
- 1 Adult Education Centre
- 4 Kindergartens
- 2 Nursery Schools

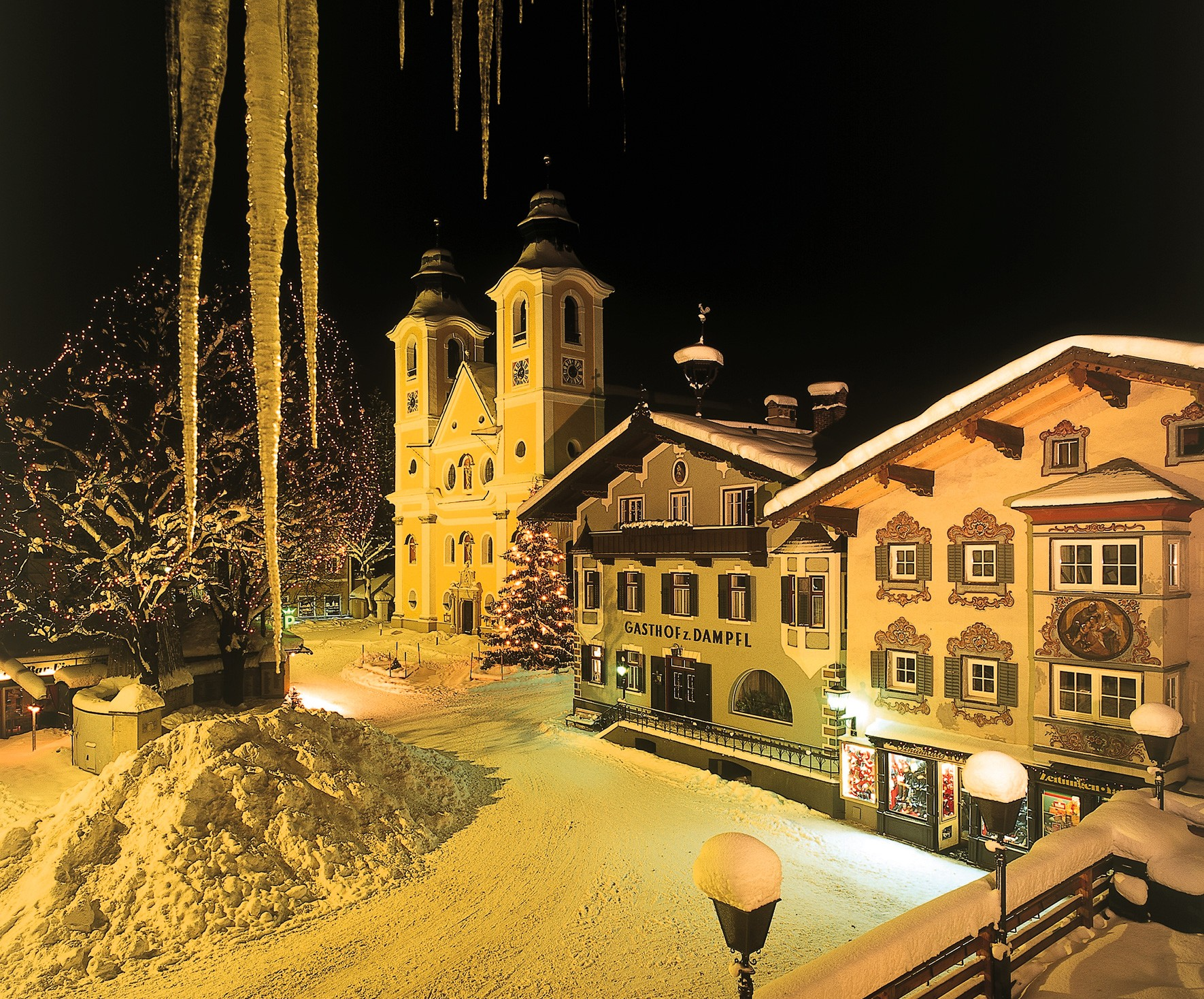

== Culture and sights ==
=== Museums ===
- Town Museum (Museum der Marktgemeinde St. Johann in Tirol) - portraying the local history of St. Johann. The museum also houses the art gallery (Galerie für zeitgenössische Kunst)

=== Sights ===
- Roman Catholic parish church of St. John (Dekanatspfarrkirche St. Johann in Tirol)
- St. Anthony's Chapel (Antoniuskapelle)
- St. Nicholas' Church (St. Nikolaus) in Weitau
- Town centre

== Sports ==
There are many sports facilities for locals and visitors alike:

- Indoor and outdoor swimming pool with sauna and steam bath
- Tennis courts, indoor and outdoor
- Crazy golf
- Mountainbike routes
- Cycle and walking paths
- Archery, low calibre rifle shooting range, pistol shooting range, air gun shooting range
- Circuit training exercise path
- Football stadium (Koasastadion)
- Riding hall, bridleway, horse-trotting course
- Kayaking and rafting
- 49 kilometres (30 mi) of ski runs, with artificial snow making facilities, toboggan runs, floodlit ice rink
- 170 kilometres (110 mi) of cross country skiing

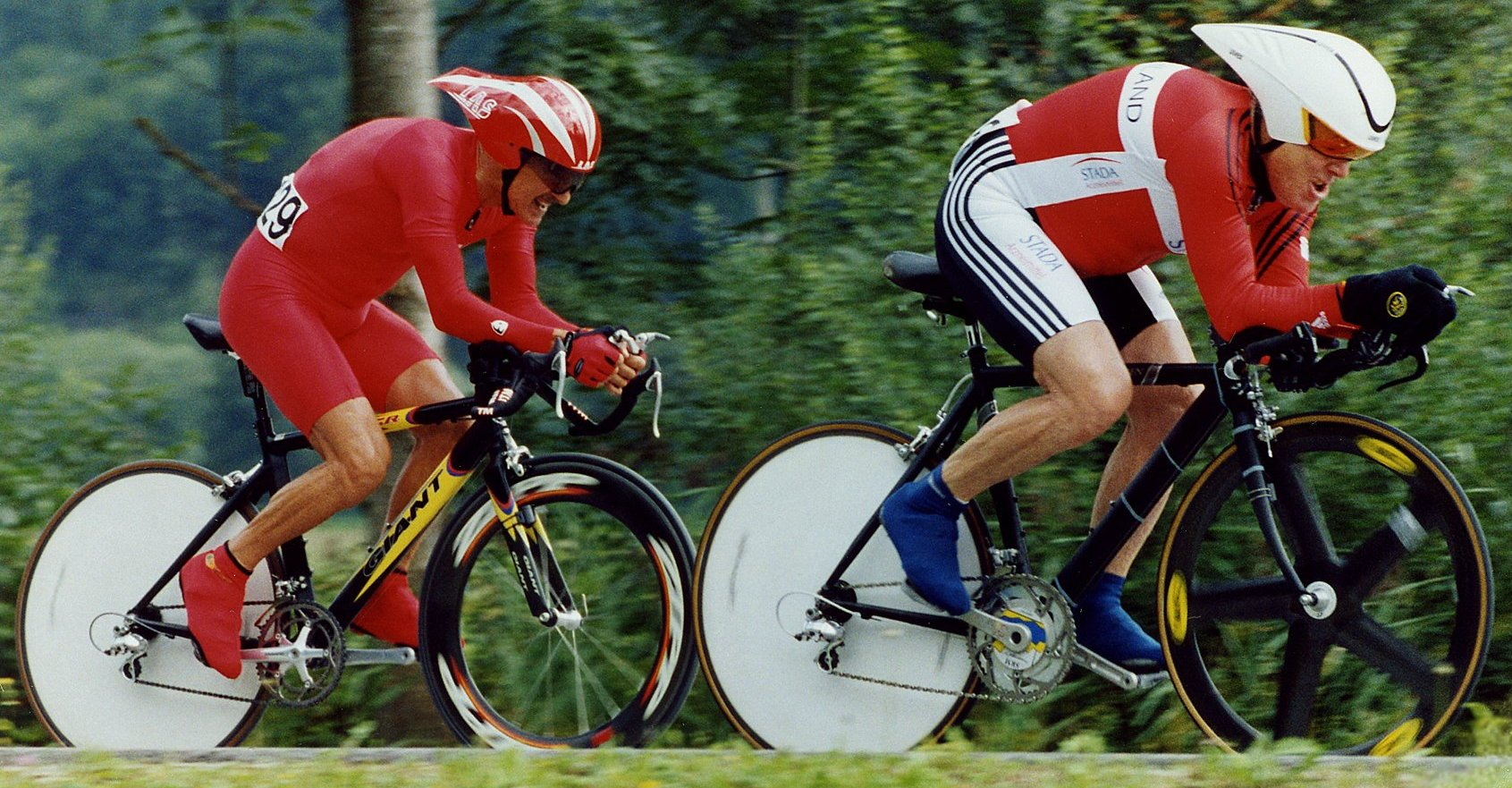
Timetrial-MastersWM

== Annual events ==
Since 2004 St. Johann has a modern event hall: the Kaisersaal. The term is derived from the mountain chain "Der Wilde Kaiser". There are many events such as lectures, corporate events and pop or rock concerts in this hall.

- Koasalauf - one of the biggest cross-country races held in January
- summer night festival "Jaggasn" held in July
- UCI cycling race of the seniors held in August
- a festival celebrating dumplings held in September

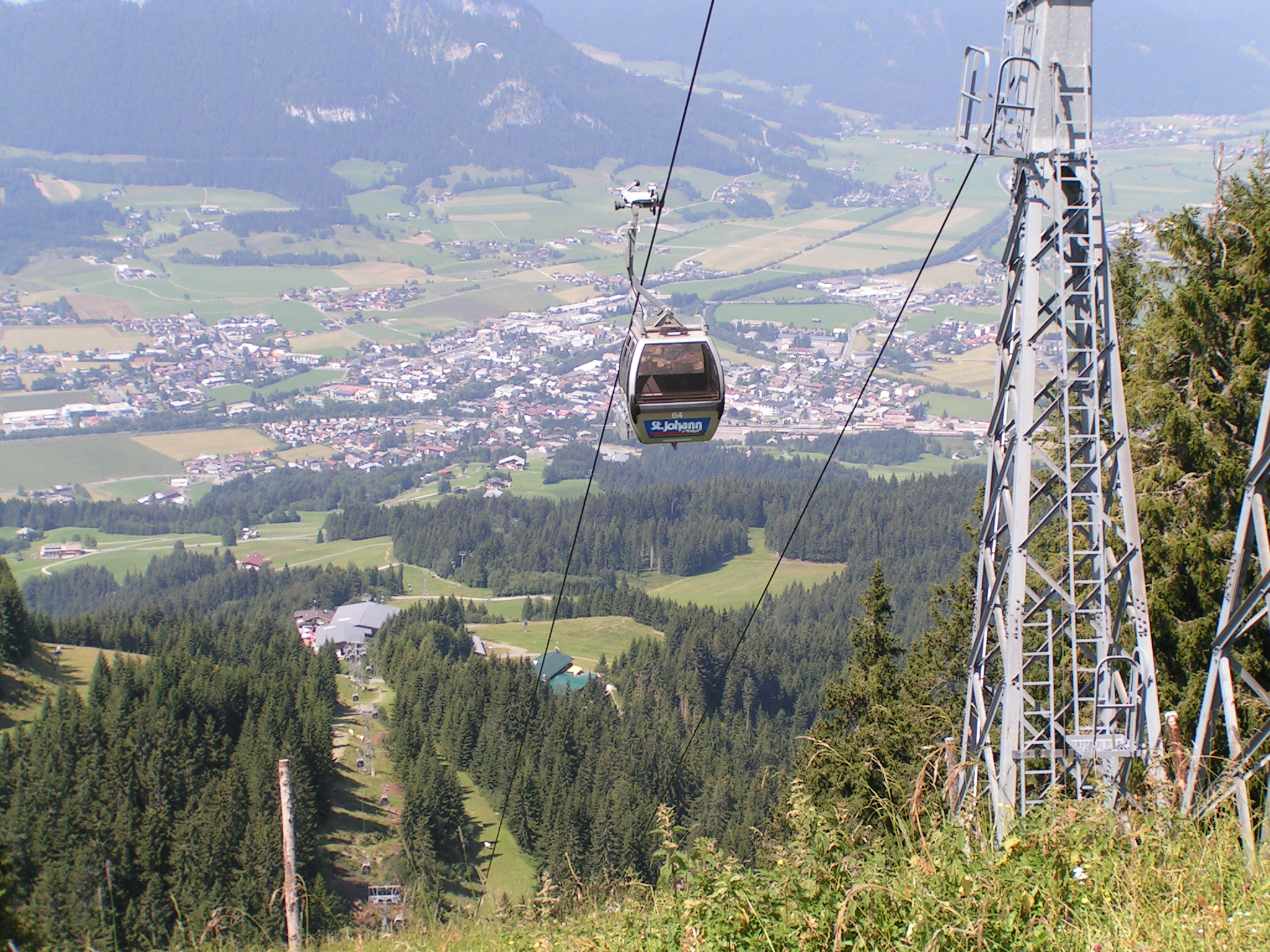
View of St. Johann in Tirol from the Harschbichl (1604 m); Tirol; Austria

== People ==
- Edmund Angerer (b. May 24, 1740 in St. Johann in Tirol; d. 1774 in Fiecht), possibly composer of the Toy Symphony
- Andrea Fischer (b. 1973 in St. Johann in Tirol), glaciologist
- Emma Hellenstainer (b. April 23, 1817 in St. Johann in Tirol; d. March 9, 1904 in Meran), pioneer of Tyrolean catering trade
- Axel Theimer (b. March 10, 1946 in St. Johann in Tirol), choir conductor, composer, singer and professor living in Minnesota
- DJ Ötzi (real name: Gerhard Friedle, b. January 7, 1971 in St. Johann in Tirol), Austrian singer and entertainer
- Andreas Widhölzl (b. October 14, 1976 in St. Johann in Tirol), Austrian ski jumper
