= Kössen =

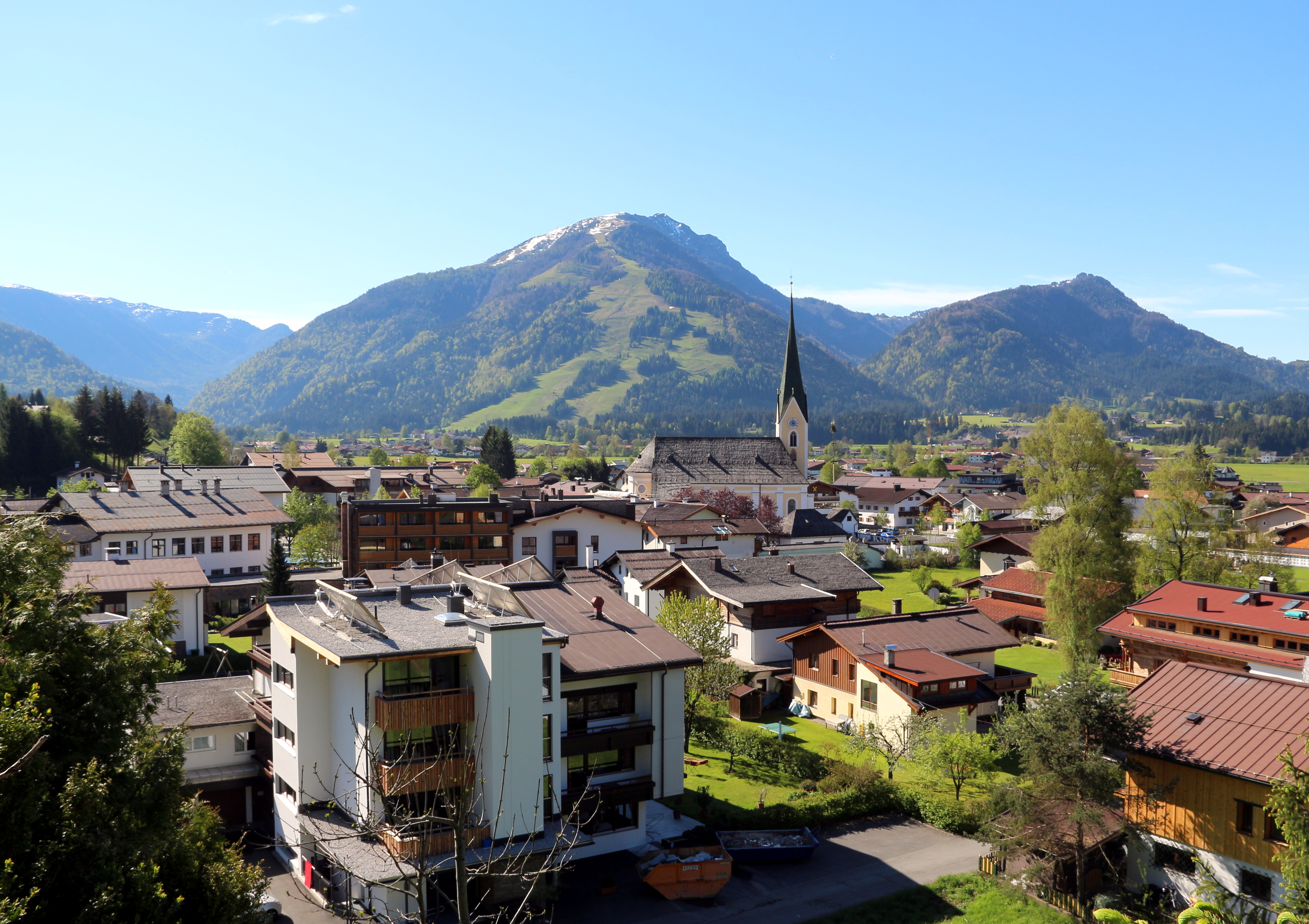

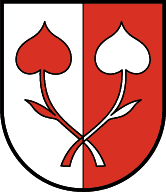
- Coat of arms

- Location within Austria
- Coordinates: 47°40′N 12°24′E
- Country: Austria
- State: Tyrol
- District: Kitzbühel

Government
  - Mayor: Dipl. Päd. Reinhold Flörl

Area
  - Total: 69.37 km^{2} (26.78 sq mi)
- Elevation: 588 m (1,929 ft)

Population (2021)
  - Total: 4,456
  - Density: 64.24/km^{2} (166.4/sq mi)
- Time zone: UTC+1 (CET)
  - Summer (DST): UTC+2 (CEST)
- Postal code: 6345
- Area code: 05375
- Website: www.koessen.tirol.gv.at

Kössen (German pronunciation: [ˈkœsn̩]) is a municipality in the Kitzbühel district in the Austrian state of Tyrol located 24 km north of Kitzbühel as well as 15.50 km north of Sankt Johann in Tirol at the Kitzbühler Ache near the border to Germany.

== Geography ==
Kössen is located in a broad basin between the Chiemgauer Alps in the north and the Kaiser Mountains in the south of the confluence of Großache river, the Kohlenbach and the Weißenbach.

== Population ==
Historical population
Year	Pop.	±%
1869	1,765	—
1880	1,760	−0.3%
1890	1,700	−3.4%
1900	1,704	+0.2%
1910	1,969	+15.6%
1923	1,819	−7.6%
1934	1,972	+8.4%
1939	1,913	−3.0%
1951	2,184	+14.2%
1961	2,361	+8.1%
1971	2,769	+17.3%
1981	3,150	+13.8%
1991	3,443	+9.3%
2001	3,936	+14.3%
2011	4,193	+6.5%

== Sights ==
Maria Klobenstein is a pilgrimage church in the community Kössen in Tirol on the border with Bavaria (municipality Schleching).

== Activities ==
Kössen's topography lends itself to air sports in the summer months. The surrounding mountain massifs create great thermals, which are near-perfect for hang gliding and paragliding flights, whilst the valley-floor makes safe landing-grounds, as it is broad, flat and mostly meadow-land; furthermore, the winter ski-lifts allow equal access to the summits in their off-season, for the new market of air-sports adventurers.

In hang-gliding, Kössen was the inaugural location for both the World Championships, in 1976, and the European Championships, in 1977. The championships were soon coordinated to be run on alternate years, with a European venue on 'even' years and a global venue on 'odd' years. A new venue is chosen each year for both competitions, but it is a mark of the popularity of Kössen as an air-sports venue, that it is the sole centre, to date, that has been used as a return-venue for each competition, in 1980 and in 1985. Para-gliding is also well-established on the Unterberg.

== Neighboring towns ==
Aschau im Chiemgau, Kirchdorf in Tirol, Reit im Winkl, Schleching, Schwendt, Unterwössen, Waidring, Walchsee
