= Oberndorf in Tirol =

- Municipality
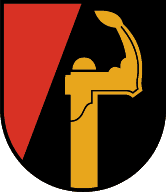
- Coat of arms

- Location within Austria
- Coordinates: 47°29′55″N 12°23′05″E
- Country: Austria
- State: Tyrol
- District: Kitzbühel

Government
  - Mayor: Johann Schweigkofler

Area
  - Total: 17.69 km^{2} (6.83 sq mi)
- Elevation: 687 m (2,254 ft)

Population (2025-01-01)
  - Total: 2,378
  - Density: 134.4/km^{2} (348.2/sq mi)
- Time zone: UTC+1 (CET)
  - Summer (DST): UTC+2 (CEST)
- Postal code: 6372
- Area code: 05352
- Vehicle registration: KB
- Website: www.oberndorf-tirol.at

Oberndorf (German: [ˈoːbɐnˌdɔʁf]) is a municipality in Kitzbühel district in the Austrian state of Tyrol. It is located in the Leukental valley, on the Kitzbühler Ache stream, halfway between St. Johann in Tirol and Kitzbühel.

The municipality consists of a main village and several hamlets, reaching up to the Kitzbühler Horn mountain. Its neighbouring municipalities are Going am Wilden Kaiser, Kitzbühel, Reith bei Kitzbühel, and St. Johann in Tirol.

== Population ==
Historical population
Year	Pop.	±%
1869	759	—
1880	765	+0.8%
1890	641	−16.2%
1900	639	−0.3%
1910	726	+13.6%
1923	769	+5.9%
1934	811	+5.5%
1939	744	−8.3%
1951	846	+13.7%
1961	933	+10.3%
1971	1,137	+21.9%
1981	1,420	+24.9%
1991	1,650	+16.2%
2001	1,944	+17.8%
2011	2,015	+3.7%

== Economy ==
Until the 18th century copper was mined at the Rerobichl.

Today, economy is focused on tourism, and a quarry. Oberndorf has a railway halt on the Salzburg-Tyrol Railway.

== Panorama ==
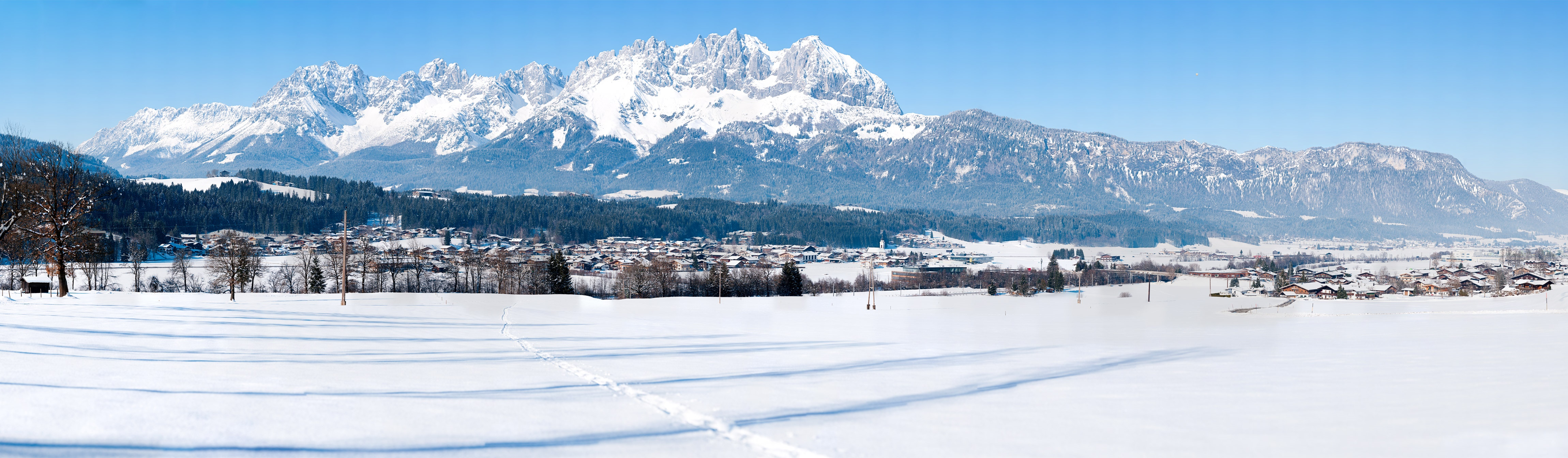
