= Sankt Ulrich am Pillersee =

St. Ulrich am Pillersee
- Municipality
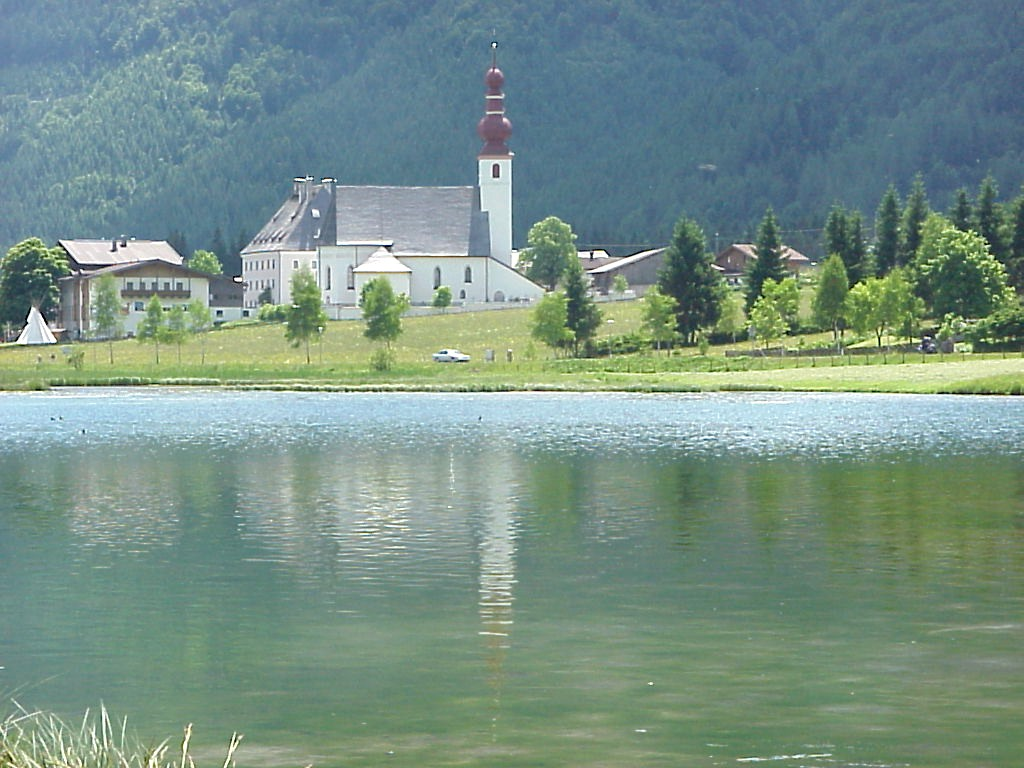

- Coat of arms

- Location within Austria
- Coordinates: 47°31′00″N 12°34′00″E
- Country: Austria
- State: Tyrol
- District: Kitzbühel

Government
  - Mayor: Brigitte Lackner

Area
  - Total: 52.02 km^{2} (20.09 sq mi)
- Elevation: 847 m (2,779 ft)

Population (2018-01-01)
  - Total: 1,819
  - Density: 34.97/km^{2} (90.56/sq mi)
- Time zone: UTC+1 (CET)
  - Summer (DST): UTC+2 (CEST)
- Postal code: 6393
- Area code: 05354
- Vehicle registration: KB
- Website: www.st.ulrich.tirol.gv.at

Sankt Ulrich am Pillersee is a municipality in the Kitzbühel district, in midwestern Austria, and is located 16.4 kilometres (10.2 mi) northeast of Kitzbühel as well as 11 kilometres (6.8 mi) west of Sankt Johann in Tirol.

== History ==
The name "St. Ulrich am Pillersee" comes from the patron saint of the church. "Pillersee" is derived from Old German pujen, pillen = brüllen ("roar"), and the German word See ("lake").

== Population ==
Historical population
Year	Pop.	±%
1869	402	—
1880	392	−2.5%
1890	376	−4.1%
1900	413	+9.8%
1910	440	+6.5%
1923	468	+6.4%
1934	447	−4.5%
1939	442	−1.1%
1951	616	+39.4%
1961	703	+14.1%
1971	894	+27.2%
1981	1,080	+20.8%
1991	1,278	+18.3%
2001	1,441	+12.8%
2011	1,593	+10.5%

== Climate ==
As Peter Dör-fler, the vicar of St. Ulrich, wrote in 1834: "Der See läßt im Winter bei großer Kält' unter dem Eis ein gewaltiges Pillen hören.." ("When it is very cold in winter, the lake makes great roaring noises below the ice.").

== Coat of arms ==
The golden cross of St. Ulrich on the locality's coat of arms refers to Ulrich, bishop of Augsburg, honoured as a fighter against the "heathen hordes". He died in 973.

== Panorama ==
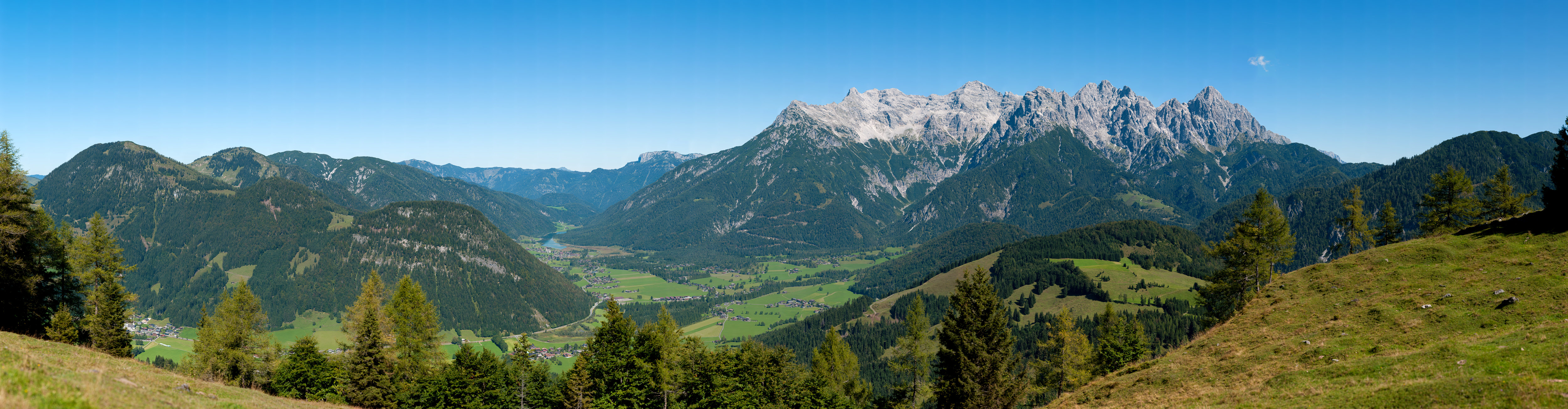
