= Jochberg, Tyrol =

Municipality in Tyrol, Austria

Jochberg
- Municipality
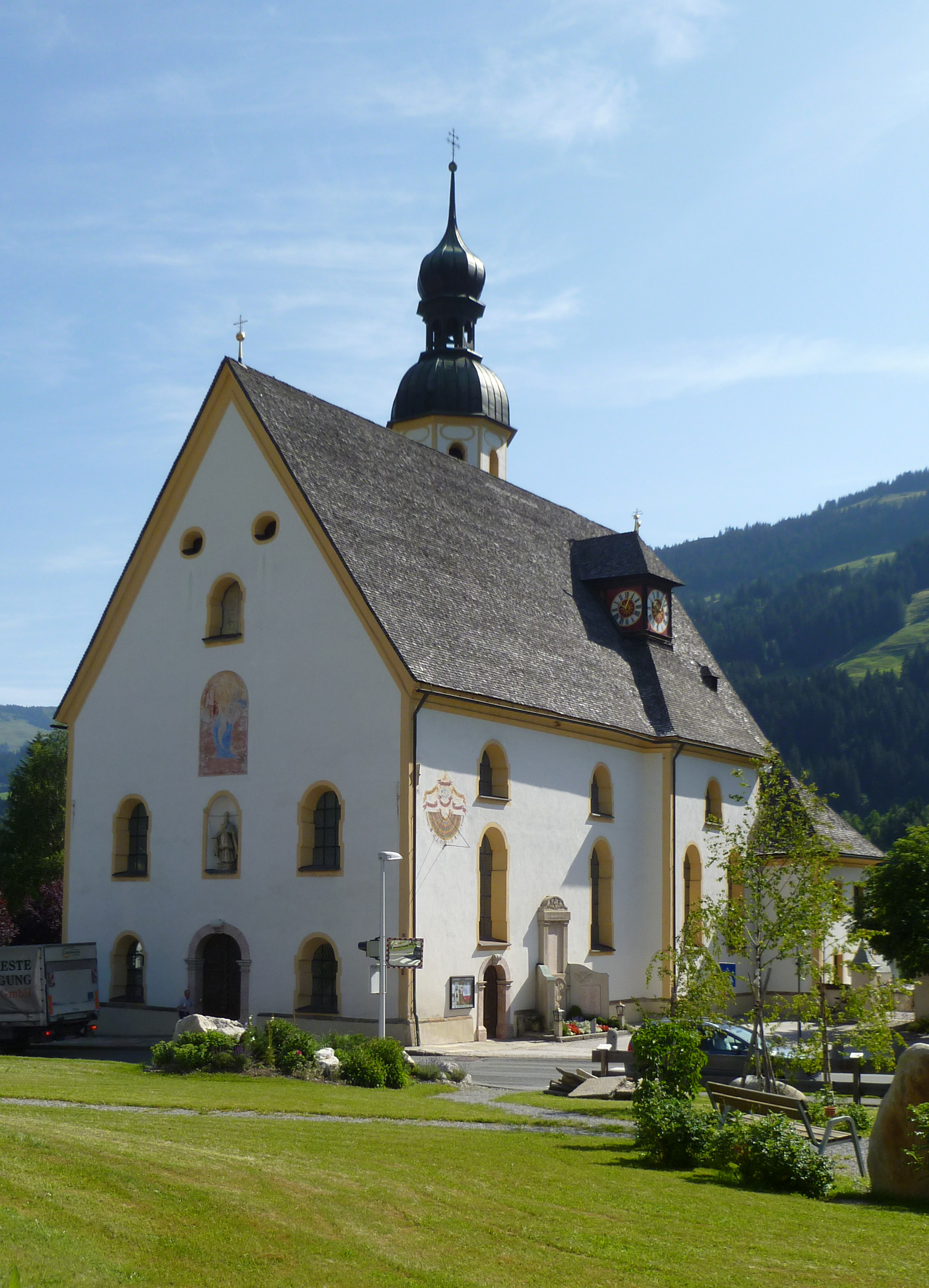
- Parish church of St. Wolfgang

- Coat of arms

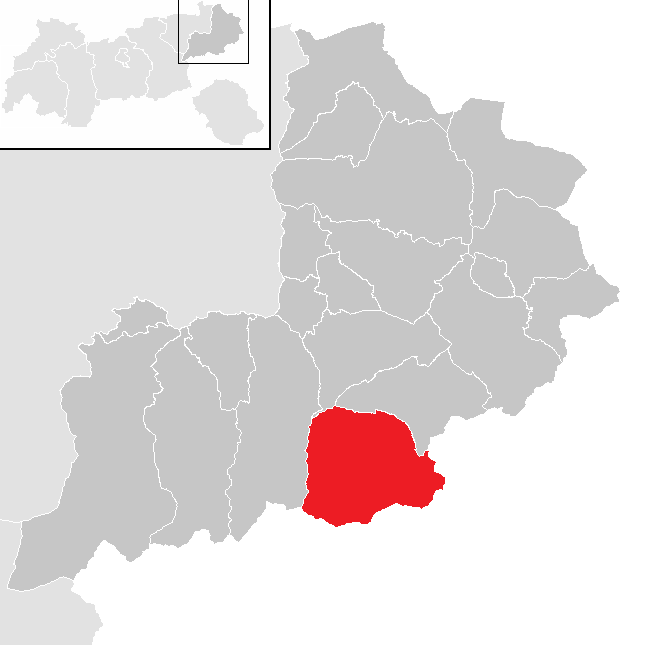
- Area of the municipality (red) within the Kitzbühel district (dark gray) of Tyrol (light gray)

- Location within Austria Location within Tyrol, Austria
- Coordinates: 47°23′00″N 12°25′00″E
- Country: Austria
- State: Tyrol
- District: Kitzbühel

Government
  - Mayor: Günther Resch (FPÖ)

Area
  - Total: 87.86 km^{2} (33.92 sq mi)
- Elevation: 923 m (3,028 ft)

Population (2018-01-01)
  - Total: 1,577
  - Density: 17.95/km^{2} (46.49/sq mi)
- Time zone: UTC+1 (CET)
  - Summer (DST): UTC+2 (CEST)
- Postal code: 6373
- Area code: 05355
- Vehicle registration: KB
- Website: jochberg.tirol.gv.at

Jochberg is a municipality in the Kitzbühel district of Tyrol, Austria. It is the southernmost municipality in the Leukental and is located 8 km (5.0 mi) south of Kitzbühel.

== Population ==
Historical population
Year	Pop.	±%
1869	981	—
1880	916	−6.6%
1890	939	+2.5%
1900	949	+1.1%
1910	925	−2.5%
1923	1,141	+23.4%
1934	1,130	−1.0%
1939	1,141	+1.0%
1951	1,290	+13.1%
1961	1,351	+4.7%
1971	1,469	+8.7%
1981	1,535	+4.5%
1991	1,461	−4.8%
2001	1,540	+5.4%
2011	1,560	+1.3%

== Economy ==
There used to be copper mining in Jochberg, until it was ceased in 1625 for lack of profitability. Nowadays Jochberg is part of the Kitzbühel ski resort, connecting the Kitzbühel skiing area to the slopes west of the Pass Thurn.
