= Kitzbühel District =

Coordinates: 47.5°N 12.4°E

Kitzbühel District Bezirk Kitzbühel
- District
- Country: Austria
- State: Tyrol
- Number of municipalities: 20
- Administrative seat: Kitzbühel

Government
  - District Governor: Michael Berger

Area
  - Total: 1,163.06 km^{2} (449.06 sq mi)

Population (2012)
  - Total: 61,966
  - Density: 53.278/km^{2} (137.99/sq mi)
- Time zone: UTC+01:00 (CET)
  - Summer (DST): UTC+02:00 (CEST)
- Vehicle registration: KB

The Bezirk Kitzbühel is an administrative district (Bezirk) in Tyrol, Austria. It borders Bavaria (Germany) in the north, the Kufstein and Schwaz districts in the west, and the Pinzgau region (Salzburg) in the east and south.

Area of the district is 1,163.06 km^{2}, population was 61,966 (January 1, 2012), and population density 53 persons per km^{2}. Administrative center of the district is Kitzbühel.

Historical population
Year	Pop.	±%
1869	22,639	—
1880	23,138	+2.2%
1890	23,092	−0.2%
1900	23,718	+2.7%
1910	26,739	+12.7%
1923	27,577	+3.1%
1934	30,502	+10.6%
1939	31,111	+2.0%
1951	36,669	+17.9%
1961	39,795	+8.5%
1971	46,516	+16.9%
1981	49,747	+6.9%
1991	54,127	+8.8%
2001	59,191	+9.4%
Source: Statistik Austria

== Administrative divisions ==
The district is divided into 20 municipalities, one of them is a town, and three of them are market towns.

=== Towns ===
1. Kitzbühel (8,134)

=== Market towns ===
1. Fieberbrunn (4,396)
2. Hopfgarten im Brixental (5,556)
3. Sankt Johann in Tirol (8,734)

=== Municipalities ===
1. Aurach bei Kitzbühel (1,125)
2. Brixen im Thale (2,673)
3. Going am Wilden Kaiser (1,866)
4. Hochfilzen (1,139)
5. Itter (1,176)
6. Jochberg (1,583)
7. Kirchberg in Tirol (5,102)
8. Kirchdorf in Tirol (3,859)
9. Kössen (4,202)
10. Oberndorf in Tirol (2,019)
11. Reith bei Kitzbühel (1,678)
12. Sankt Jakob in Haus (759)
13. Sankt Ulrich am Pillersee (1,609)
14. Schwendt (790)
15. Waidring (1,946)
16. Westendorf (3,620)

(population numbers January 1, 2012)
