= Waidring =

- Municipality
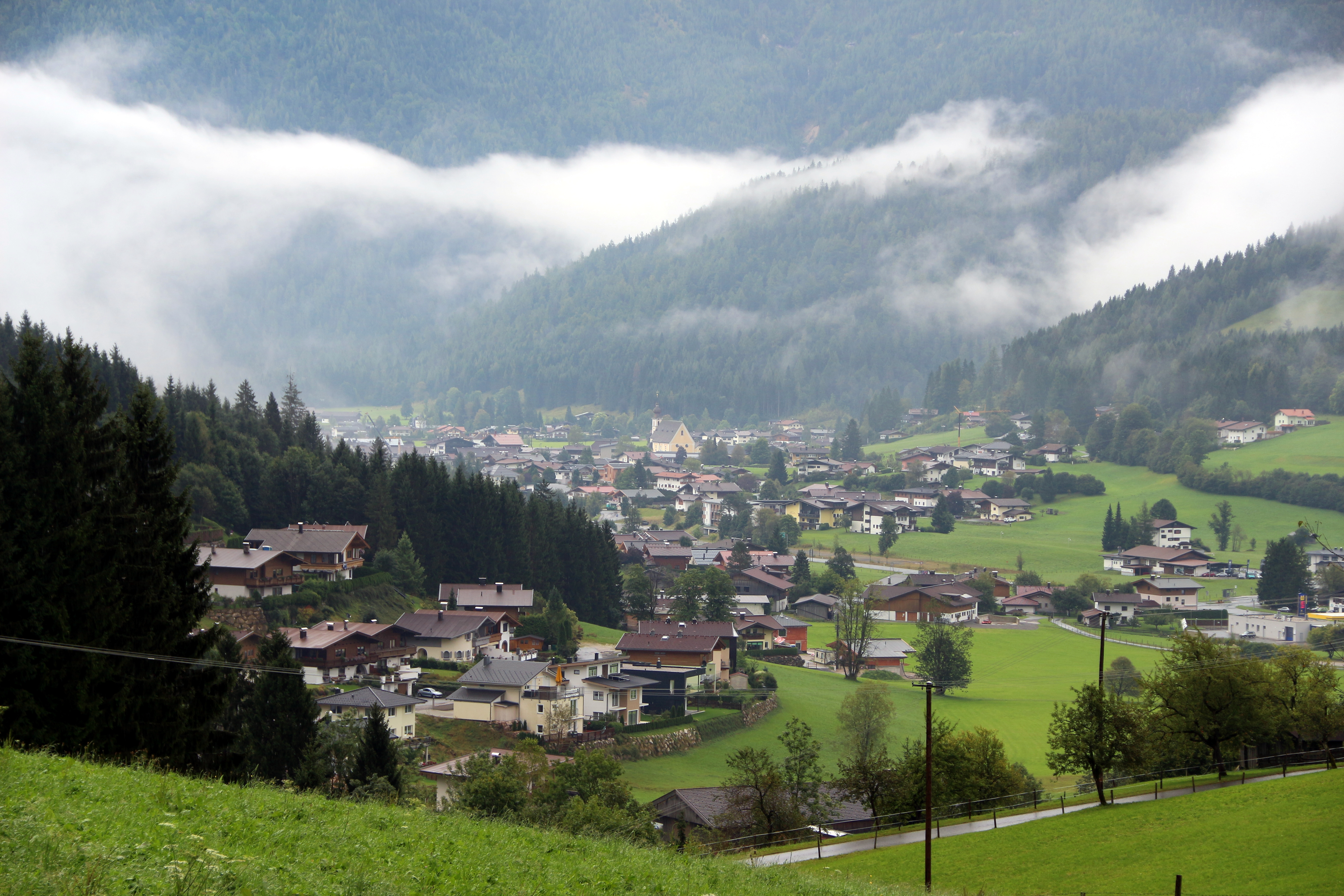

- Coat of arms

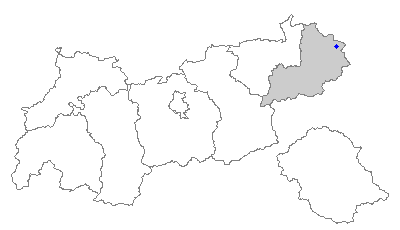
- Location of Waidring in Tyrol

- Location within Austria
- Coordinates: 47°34′00″N 12°34′00″E
- Country: Austria
- State: Tyrol
- District: Kitzbühel

Government
  - Mayor: Georg Hochfilzer

Area
  - Total: 63.75 km^{2} (24.61 sq mi)
- Elevation: 778 m (2,552 ft)

Population (2021)
  - Total: 2,048
  - Density: 32.13/km^{2} (83.20/sq mi)
- Time zone: UTC+1 (CET)
  - Summer (DST): UTC+2 (CEST)
- Postal code: 6384
- Area code: 0 53 53
- Vehicle registration: KB
- Website: www.waidring.at

Waidring is a municipality in the Kitzbühel district in the Austrian state of Tyrol located 20 km northeast of Kitzbühel and 9 km east of Kirchdorf in Tirol near the border with Salzburg. The village was mentioned for the first time as „Waitheringen“ in documents from 1147.
