= Reith bei Kitzbühel =

- Municipality
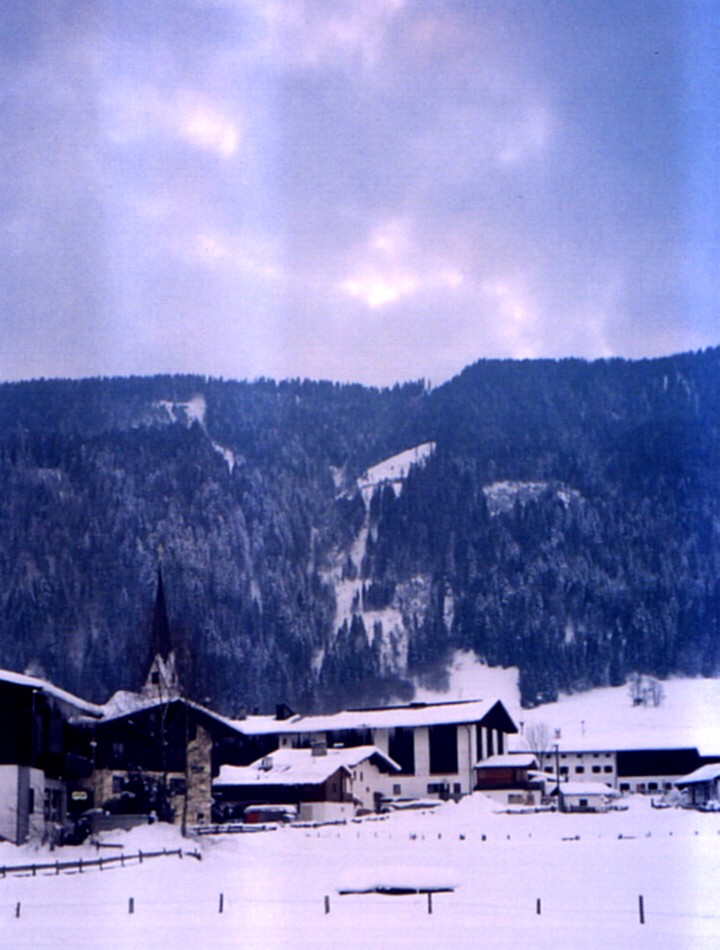

- Coat of arms

- Location within Austria
- Coordinates: 47°28′33″N 12°20′40″E
- Country: Austria
- State: Tyrol
- District: Kitzbühel

Government
  - Mayor: Stefan Jöchl

Area
  - Total: 15.66 km^{2} (6.05 sq mi)
- Elevation: 762 m (2,500 ft)

Population (2018-01-01)
  - Total: 1,662
  - Density: 106.1/km^{2} (274.9/sq mi)
- Time zone: UTC+1 (CET)
  - Summer (DST): UTC+2 (CEST)
- Postal code: 6353, 6365, 6370
- Area code: 05356
- Vehicle registration: KB
- Website: www.reith.eu

Reith bei Kitzbühel is a municipality in the Kitzbühel district in the Austrian state of Tyrol located 4.50 km northwest of Kitzbühel. Main source of income is tourism.

== Population ==
Historical population
Year	Pop.	±%
1869	511	—
1880	489	−4.3%
1890	479	−2.0%
1900	517	+7.9%
1910	526	+1.7%
1923	515	−2.1%
1934	521	+1.2%
1939	489	−6.1%
1951	650	+32.9%
1961	611	−6.0%
1971	850	+39.1%
1981	1,209	+42.2%
1991	1,428	+18.1%
2001	1,594	+11.6%
2011	1,633	+2.4%

== Panorama ==
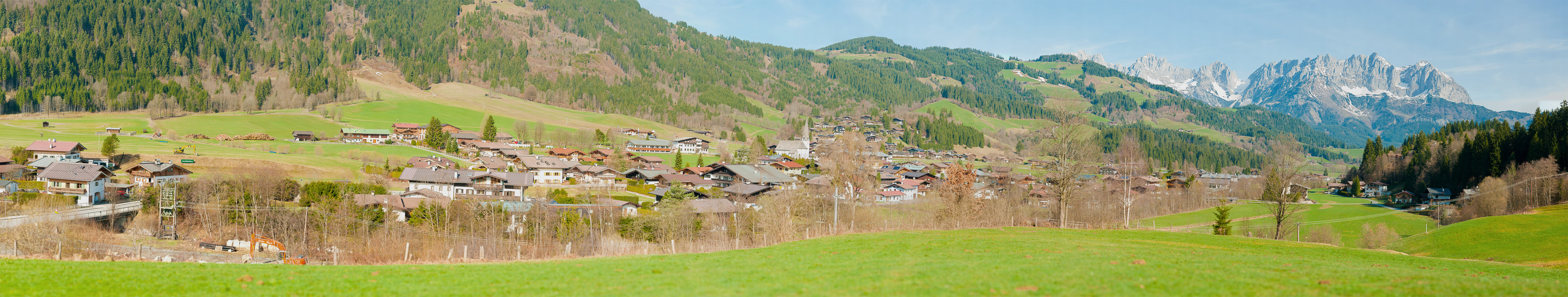
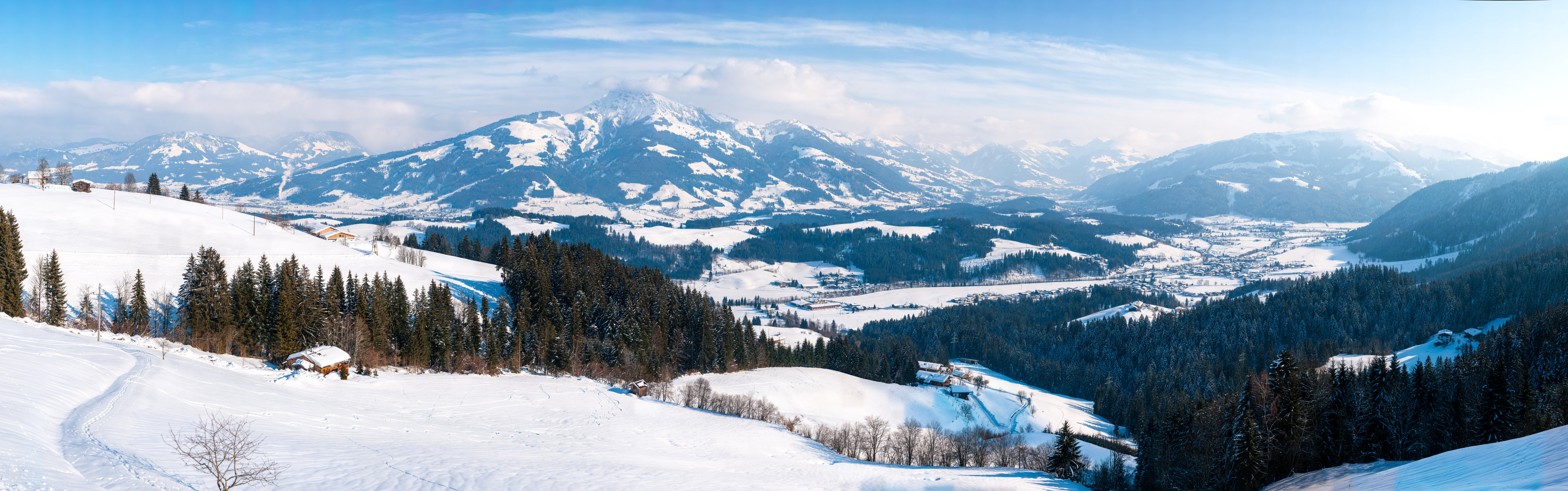
