= Schwendt =

- Municipality
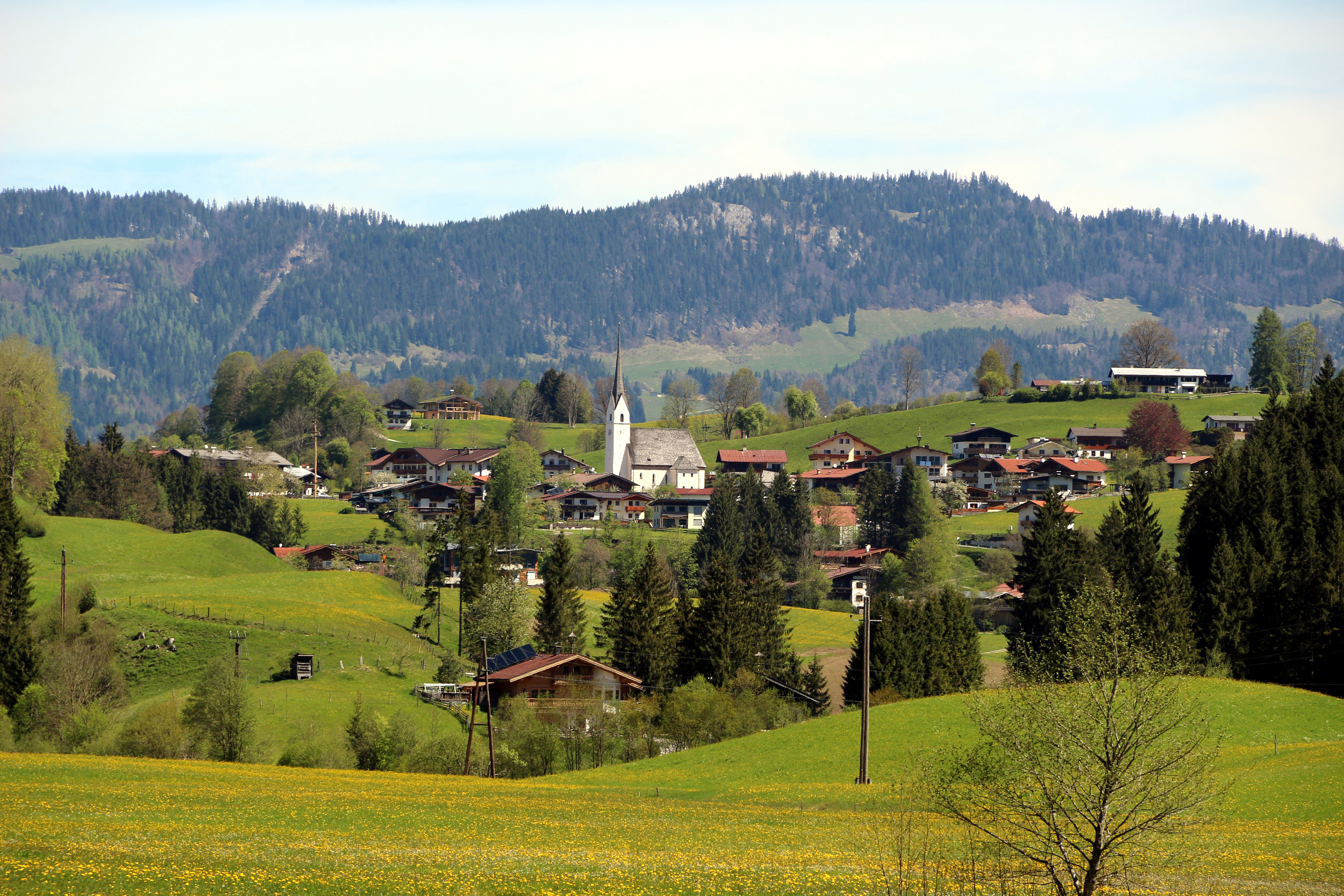

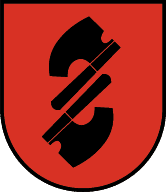
- Coat of arms

- Location within Austria
- Coordinates: 47°38′00″N 12°24′00″E
- Country: Austria
- State: Tyrol
- District: Kitzbühel

Government
  - Mayor: Sebastian Haunholter

Area
  - Total: 30.85 km^{2} (11.91 sq mi)
- Elevation: 702 m (2,303 ft)

Population (2021-01-01)
  - Total: 877
  - Density: 28.4/km^{2} (73.6/sq mi)
- Time zone: UTC+1 (CET)
  - Summer (DST): UTC+2 (CEST)
- Postal code: 6385
- Area code: 05375
- Vehicle registration: KB
- Website: www.riskommunal.net/ schwendt

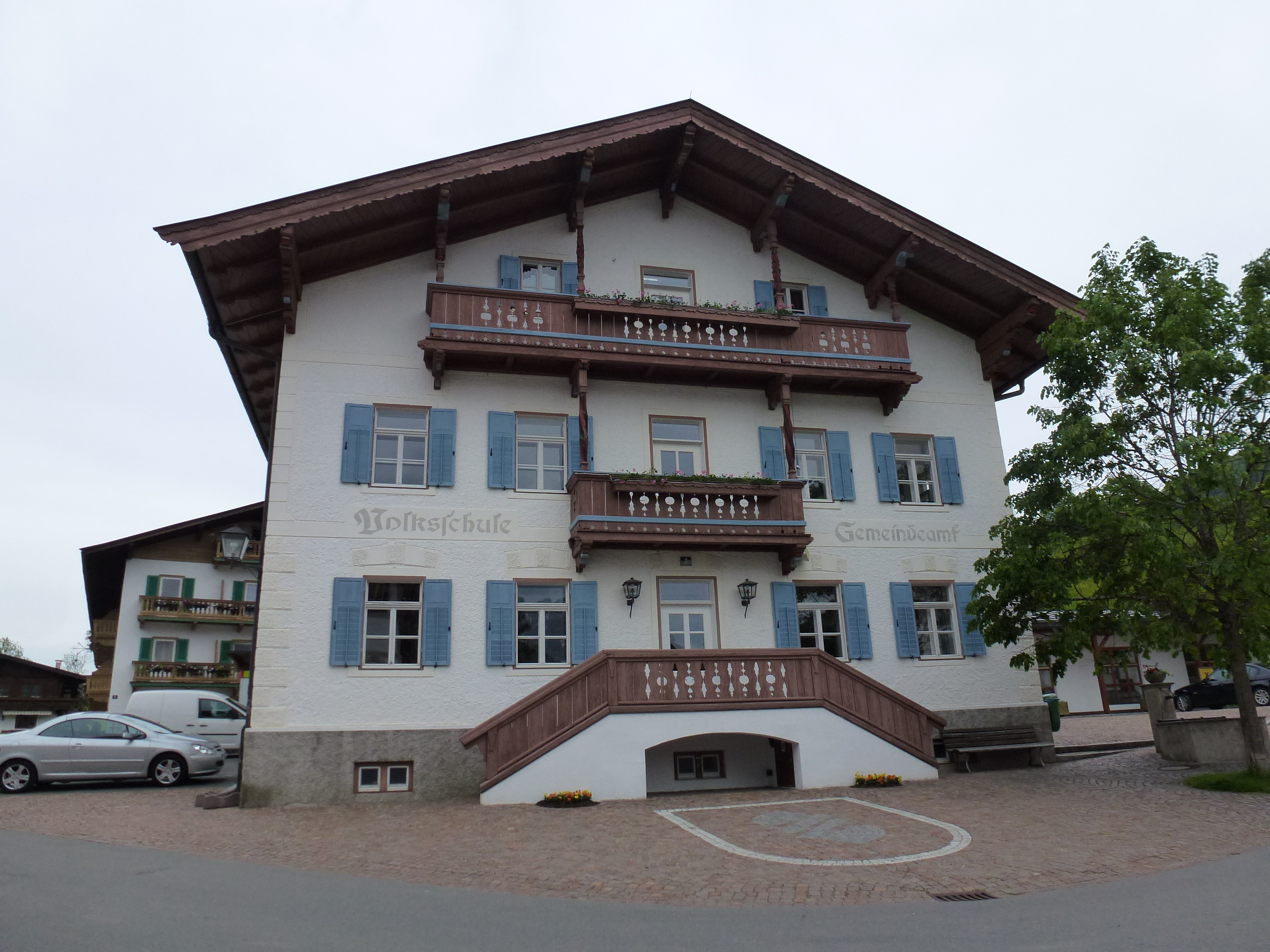

Schwendt is a municipality in the Kitzbühel district in the Austrian state of Tyrol located 17 km north of Kitzbühel and 6 km below Kössen.

The name of the village comes from the old word "schwenden" (meaning to grub-up).

Agriculture and tourism are its main sources of income.

== Population ==
Historical population

Year	Pop.	±%
1869	394	—
1880	398	+1.0%
1890	413	+3.8%
1900	388	−6.1%
1910	352	−9.3%
1923	368	+4.5%
1934	364	−1.1%
1939	346	−4.9%

Year	Pop.	±%
1951	421	+21.7%
1961	479	+13.8%
1971	568	+18.6%
1981	591	+4.0%
1991	673	+13.9%
2001	763	+13.4%
2011	796	+4.3%
