= Rupertiwinkel =

Coordinates: 47.9367°N 12.9325°E

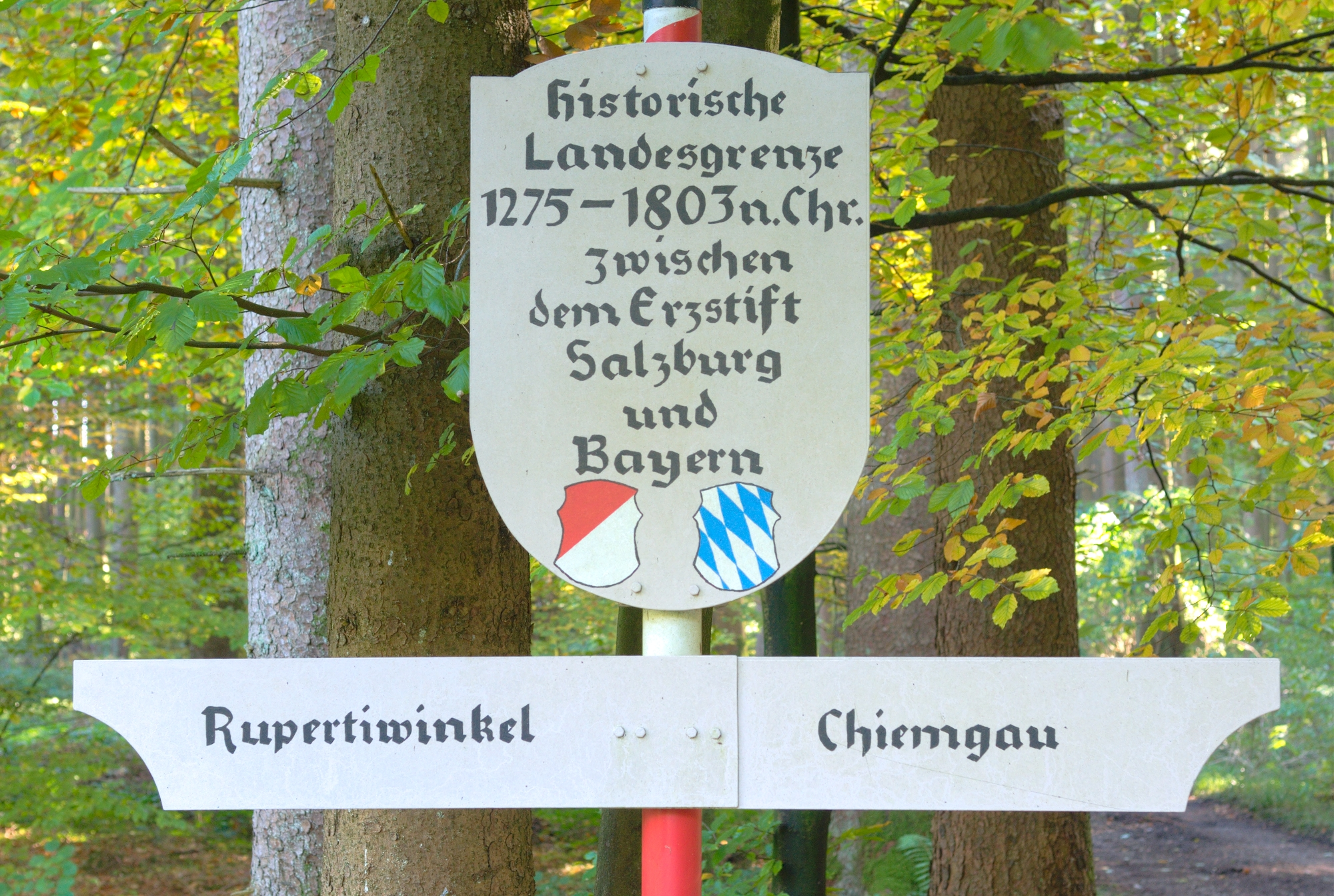
Historising signpost on the former Salzburg-Bavarian border

The Rupertiwinkel is a small historic region on the southeastern border of Bavaria, Germany. Part of the Archbishopric of Salzburg until the early 19th century, it is named after the first Salzburg bishop Saint Rupert (c.660–710), apostle to the Duchy of Bavaria.

== Geography ==
The area is located in the Alpine Foreland of Upper Bavaria, about 20 km (12 mi) north of Salzburg in the German - Austrian border region. Centered on the town of Laufen and Waginger See, it stretches between the left shore of the Salzach River in the east and the Bavarian Chiemgau cultural landscape in the west.

The northern Rupertiwinkel up to Mt. Rampelsberg and the Alz River at Trostberg is administrated within the Traunstein District, the northernmost municipality of Tyrlaching within the district of Altötting. The southern half down to the Hochstaufen and Teisenberg peaks of the Chiemgau Alps and the Saalach River is part of Berchtesgadener Land.

Rupertiwinkel municipalities in the districts of Traunstein (TS), Berchtesgadener Land (BGL) and Altötting (AÖ)

=== Municipalities ===
- Altötting District
  - Tyrlaching
- Berchtesgadener Land District
  - Ainring
  - Anger
  - Freilassing
  - Saaldorf-Surheim
  - Laufen
  - Piding
  - Teisendorf
- Traunstein District
  - Fridolfing
  - Kirchanschöring
  - Palling
  - Petting
  - Taching am See
  - Tittmoning
  - Heiligkreuz and Lindach villages of Trostberg
  - Waging am See
  - Wonneberg

== History ==
Since the early Middle Ages, the area was part of the Salzburggau within the Bavarian stem duchy. Already about 700 Duke Theodo of Bavaria granted the village of Piding to Bishop Rupert. Due to the fertile soils west of the Salzach River, the archbishops in the following centuries aspired to enlarge their possessions. In 1125 the Höglwörth Abbey was founded, a Canons Regular monastery near Anger. In the course of the elevation of Salzburg to a Prince-archbishopric, the episcopal territory was acknowledged by Duke Louis II of Bavaria in 1275.

From the early 14th century, the Rupertiwinkel formed the western part of the Salzburg Flachgau region. The archbishops made Palace Staufeneck an episcopal residence; in the north, Tittmoning Castle was rebuilt as a border fortress. When the prince-archbishopric was secularised in 1803, the last Prince-Archbishop Count Hieronymus von Colloredo was replaced by Ferdinand III of Habsburg-Lorraine, former Grand Duke of Tuscany, who went on to rule as Elector of Salzburg until 1806. With Salzburg, the territory passed to the Austrian Empire thereafter. In the wake of the Vienna Congress, Austria and Bavaria finally agreed in 1816 to make the course of the Salzach the border between their lands.

Though the population of the Rupertiwinkel stresses its social and cultural distinctiveness (especially in folk music and Tracht costumes), the region became a constituent part of the Bavarian state. When after World War II the Salzburg state administration demanded an affiliation with Austria, the claims were strongly rejected.

== Notable people ==
- Pope Benedict XVI, born Joseph Ratzinger, spent his early childhood years in Tittmoning on the Salzach River.
- Dieter Sattler, architect and diplomat, spent considerable time with his family at their estate near Taching am See
- Johann Michael Rottmayr, notable baroque painter, born in Laufen an der Salzach
- Balthasar Permoser, sculptor, baptized in Kammer (until 1923 parish Otting, Rupertiwinkel)
- Manuela Kraller (born 1981), singer, born in Ainring

== Gallery ==
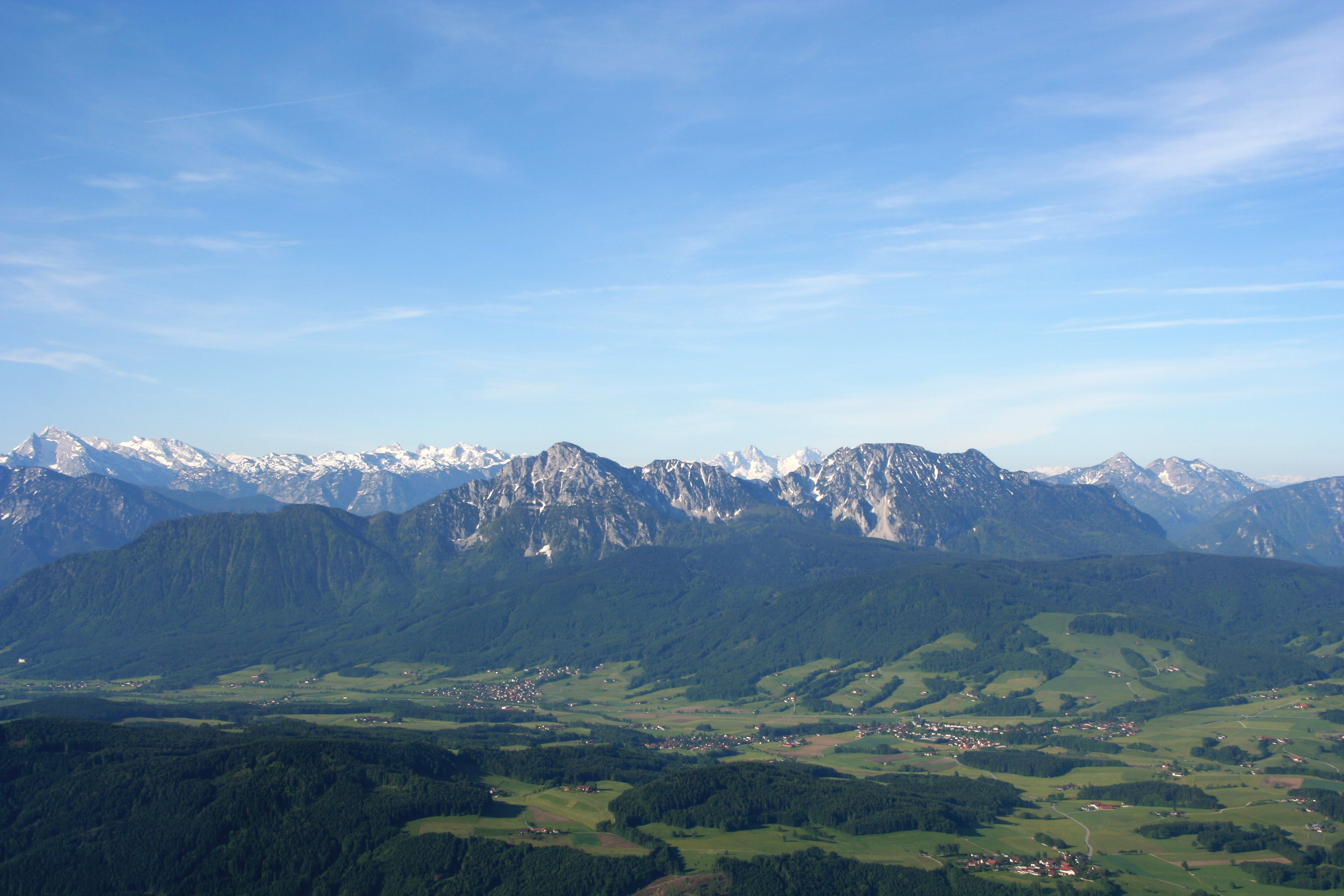
Aerial view of Rupertiwinkel

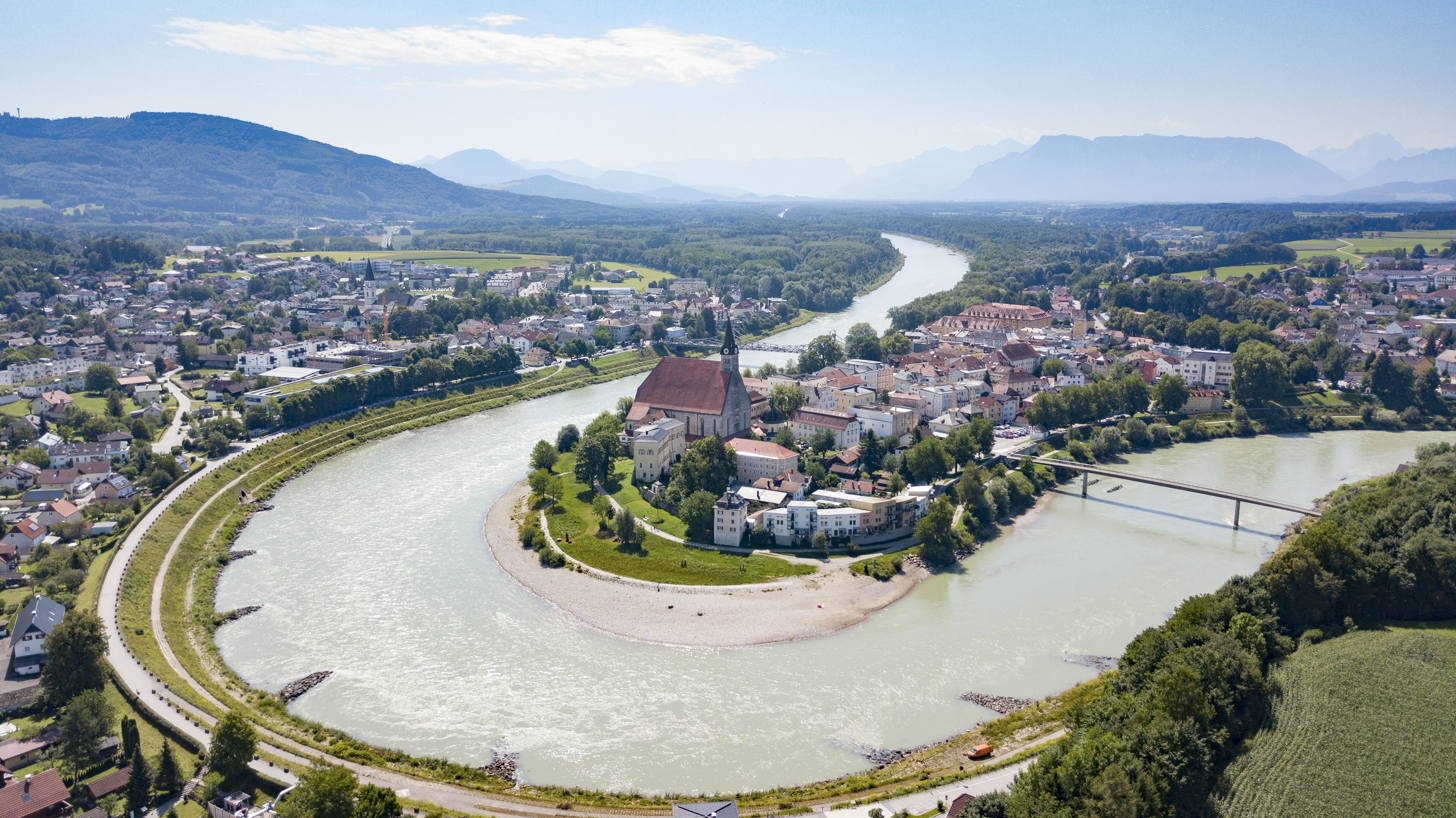
Salzach near Laufen

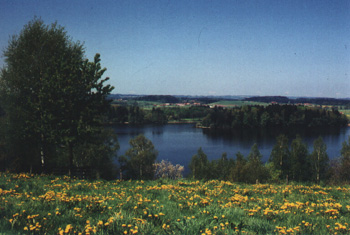
Abtsdorfer See

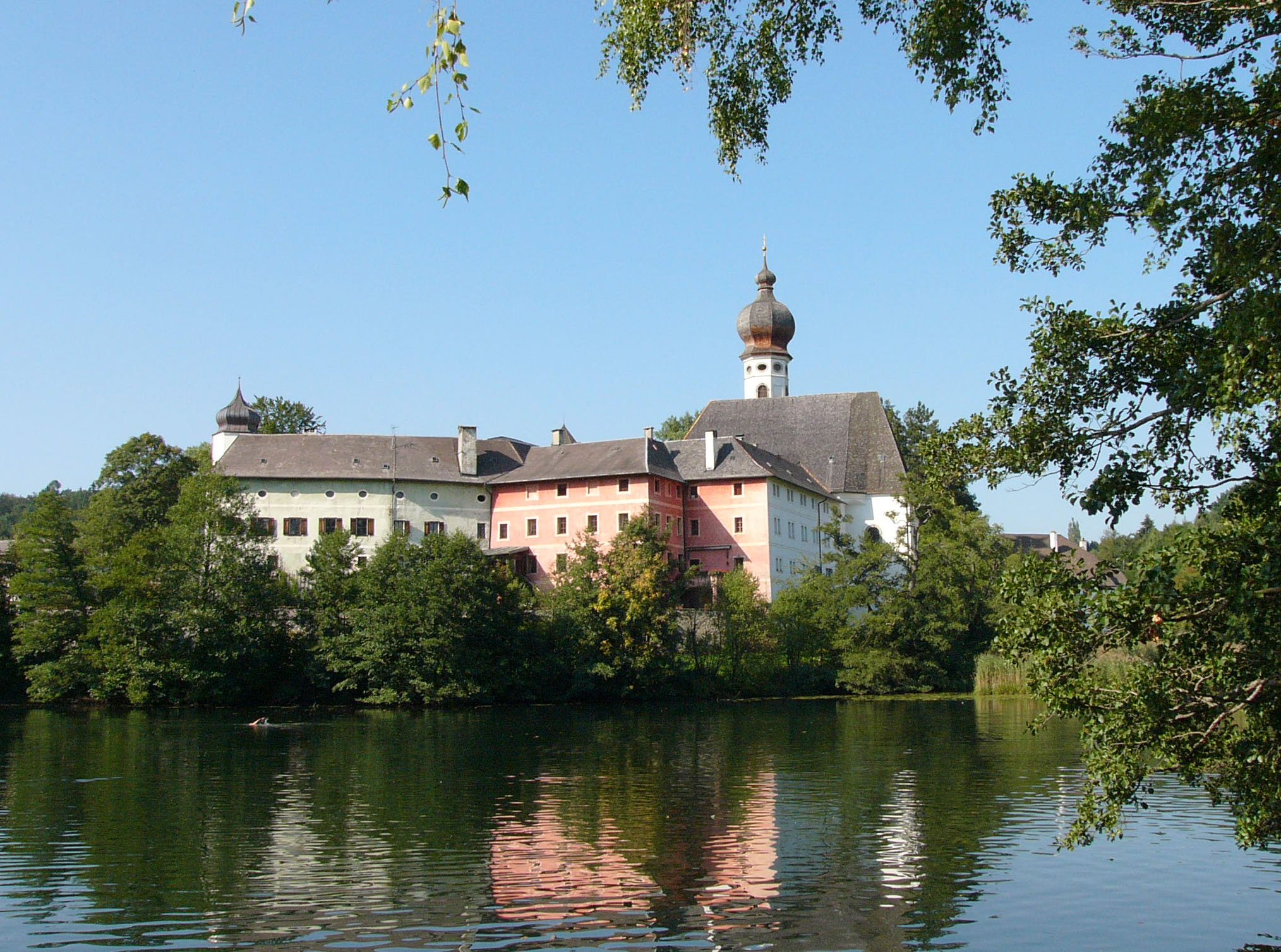
Abbey of Höglwörth

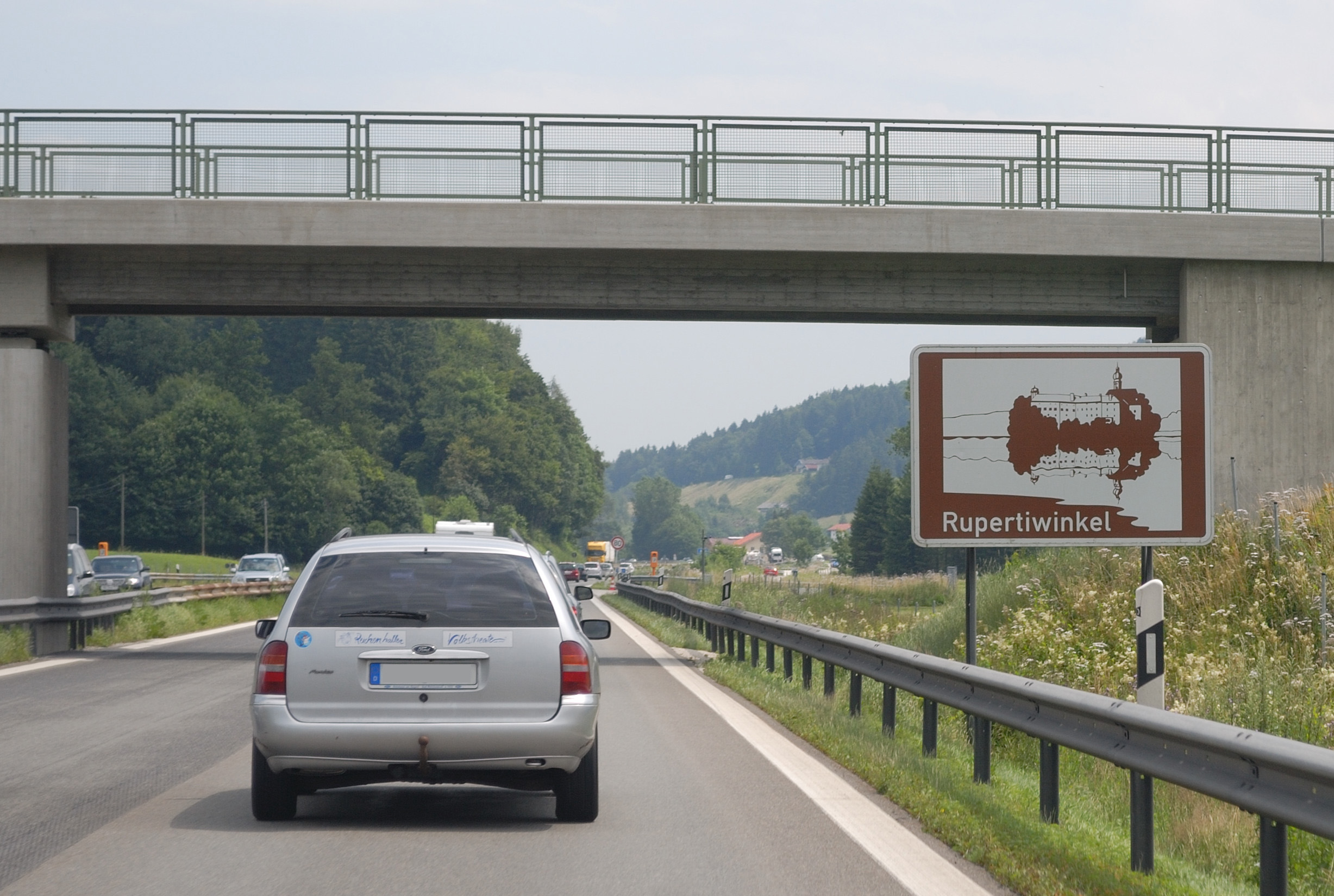
Educational table „Rupertiwinkel“ at the freeway A8
