= Palace Staufeneck =

- Schloss Staufeneck (in German)
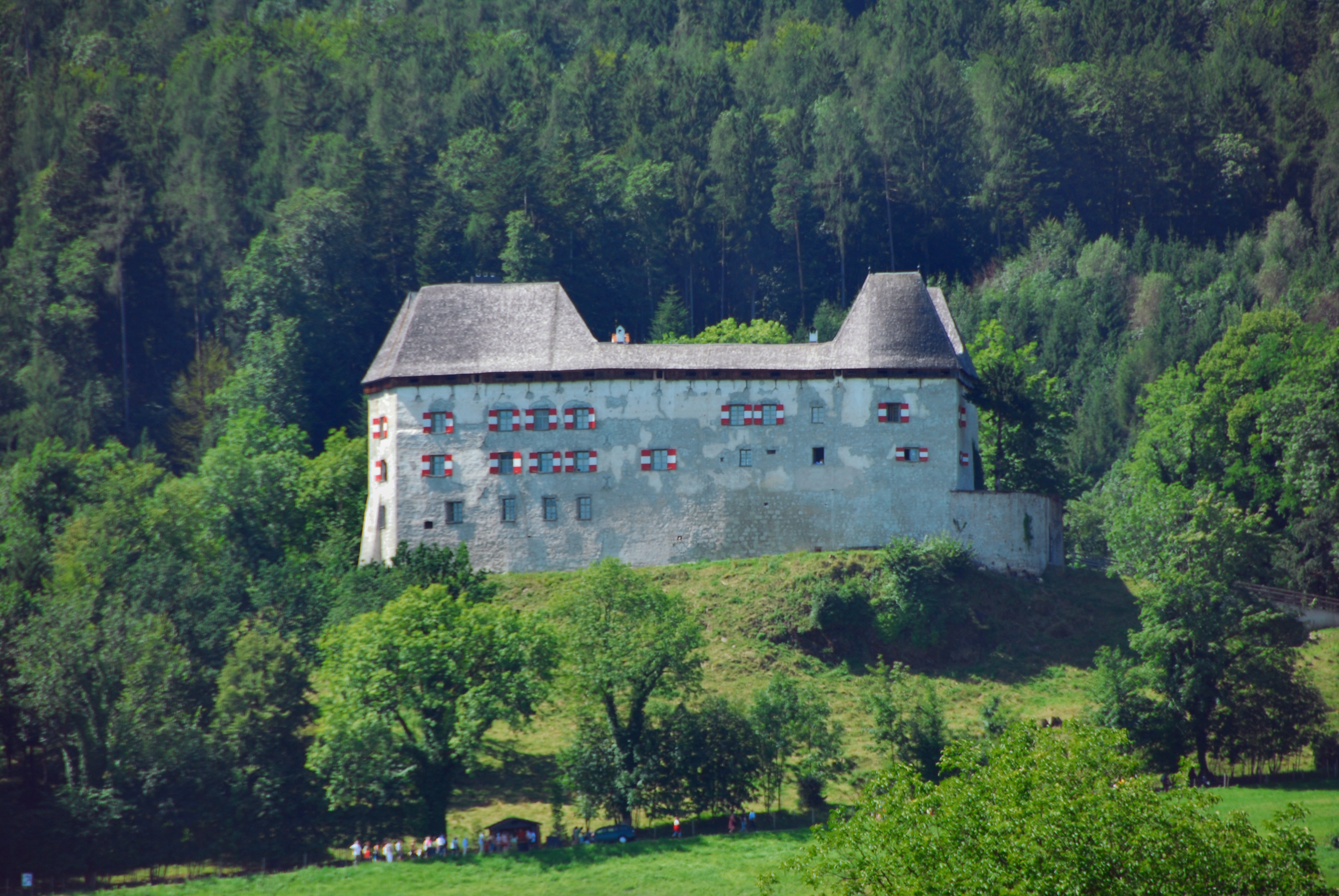
- Palace Staufeneck
- Interactive map of the Palace Staufeneck area

General information
- Location: Piding, Bavaria, Austria
- Coordinates: 47.4537°N 12.5340°E
- Construction started: 12th century

The Palace Staufeneck (Schloss Staufeneck in German) is in the municipality of Piding in Berchtesgaden. The fortress was built in the 12th century by Burggrafen von Staufeneck. In the year 1307 the castle went into the ownership of the Erzstift Salzburg, under whom it served as one of the maintenance courts in Rupertiwinkel from 1365 to 1805. In 1503, the castle was under Archbishop Leonhard von Keutschach who fundamentally transformed it, giving it its present appearance. Since 1894, the castle has been under private ownership. In the 20th century, the castle housed a museum. After a complete renovation, it is once again inhabited.

== Other ==
Every August since 2005, there has been a medieval market around the castle.
