= Hochstaufen =

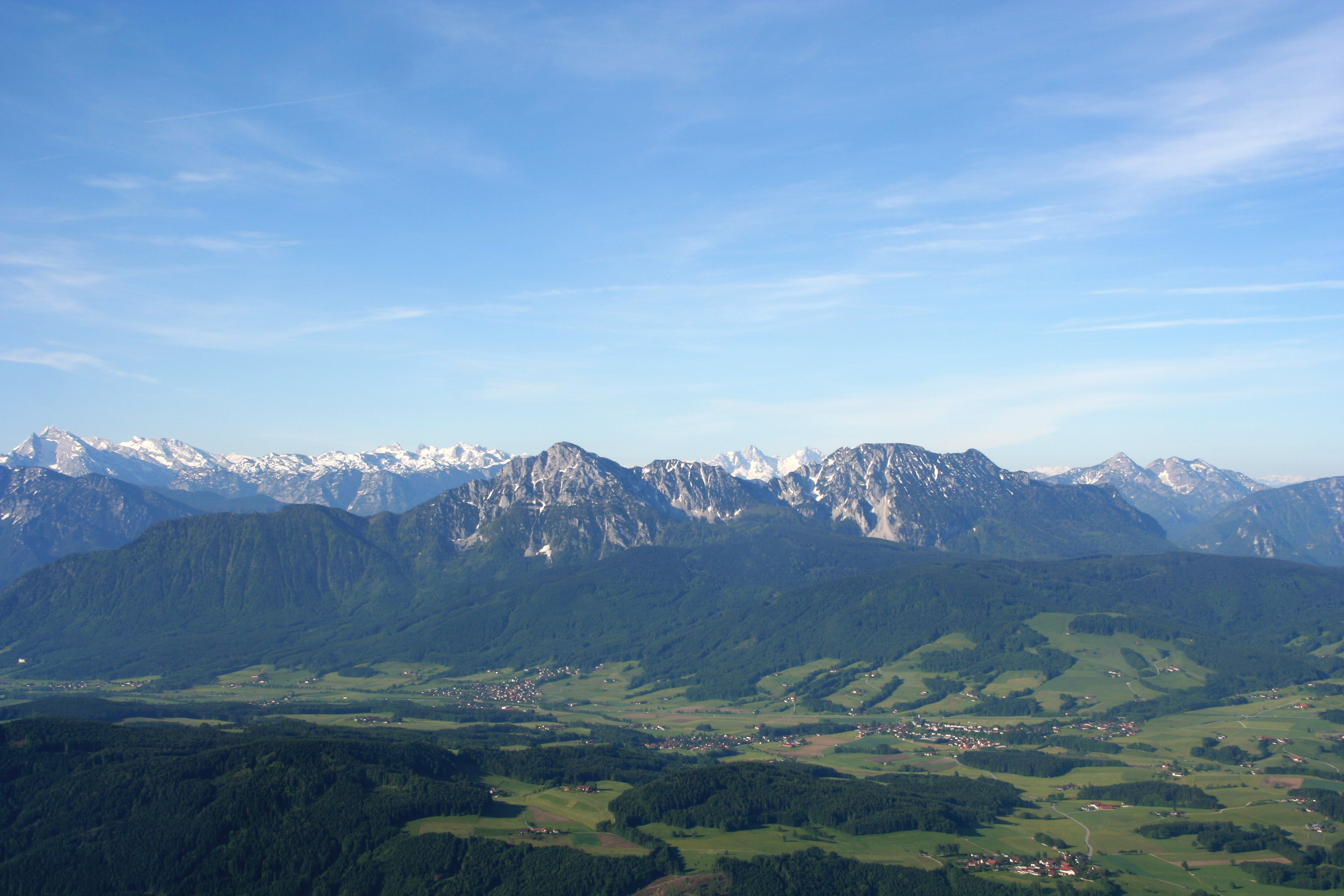
- The Staufen mountain range from an airplane

Highest point
- Elevation: 1,771 m (5,810 ft)
- Prominence: 301 m (988 ft)
- Coordinates: 47°45′0″N 12°51′0″E

Naming
- Pronunciation: German: [ˌhoːxˈʃtaʊfən]

Geography
- Location: Bavaria, Germany
- Parent range: Chiemgau Alps

Climbing
- Easiest route: Barthlmahd path

The Hochstaufen is the easternmost mountain of the Chiemgau Alps, Germany. It is located in the north of Bad Reichenhall (Landkreis Berchtesgadener Land). The mountain belongs to the Staufen massif and is a popular destination for mountaineering.

In the 17th century there were some mines at the Hochstaufen, the best known gallery was the Doktor-Oswald-Gallery, located only 60 m underneath the summit.

At an altitude of 1,750 m is the Reichenhaller Haus, an alpine hut of the Deutscher Alpenverein (Section Bad Reichenhall).

== Routes ==
- Bad Reichenhall (former Padinger Alm) – Barthlmahd – Reichenhaller Haus – Hochstaufen
- Bad Reichenhall (former Padinger Alm) – Buchmahd – "Steinerne Jaeger" – Reichenhaller Haus – Hochstaufen
- Piding (Urwies or Mauthausen) – Mairalm – "Steinerne Jaeger" – Reichenhaller Haus – Hochstaufen
- Piding (Urwies or Mauthausen) – Mairalm – Pidinger Klettersteig (fixed rope route) – Hochstaufen
- Piding or Aufham-Anger – Steiner Alm – Hochstaufen
- Passage from Zwiesel – Zennokopf – Mittelstaufen – Reichenhaller Haus – Hochstaufen
- Passage from Zwieselalm – Barthlmahd – Reichenhaller Haus – Hochstaufen
- Passage from Fuderheuberg – "Steinerne Jaeger" – Reichenhaller Haus – Hochstaufen

The fixed rope route Pidinger Klettersteig was created in 2003 and is one of the most challenging fixed rope routes in Germany.

== Miscellaneous ==
Near the summit of Hochstaufen, next to the Reichenhaller Haus, stands the Staufenkapelle, a small mountain chapel built in 1928–29. Each year, a traditional open-air mass called the Staufenmesse is held there after the summer solstice, drawing many visitors. On the evening before, the ridge and path are lit by fires placed by volunteers.

After heavy rainfalls earthquakes occur at the Hochstaufen, so there are several seismometers of LMU Munich around the mountain.

In September 1993 the innkeeper couple of the Reichenhaller Haus was murdered in a brutal robbery.
