= Solar eclipse of May 31, 2003 =

21st-century annular solar eclipse

- Annular eclipse
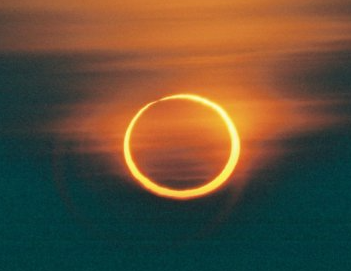
- Annular from Culloden, Scotland

- Map
- Gamma: 0.996
- Magnitude: 0.9384

Maximum eclipse
- Duration: 217 s (3 min 37 s)
- Coordinates: 66.6°N 24.5°W
- Max. width of band: km

Times (UTC)
- Greatest eclipse: 4:09:22

References
- Saros: 147 (22 of 80)
- Catalog # (SE5000): 9515

An annular solar eclipse occurred at the Moon's ascending node of orbit on Saturday, May 31, 2003, with a magnitude of 0.9384. A solar eclipse occurs when the Moon passes between Earth and the Sun, thereby totally or partly obscuring the image of the Sun for a viewer on Earth. An annular solar eclipse occurs when the Moon's apparent diameter is smaller than the Sun's, blocking most of the Sun's light and causing the Sun to look like an annulus (ring). An annular eclipse appears as a partial eclipse over a region of the Earth thousands of kilometres wide. Occurring about 2.6 days after apogee (on May 28, 2003, at 14:00 UTC), the Moon's apparent diameter was smaller.

Annularity was visible across central Greenland, the Faroe Islands, Iceland, Jan Mayen and northern Scotland. A partial eclipse was visible for parts of Eastern Europe, North Asia, West Asia, Middle East, Alaska, Greenland, and northwestern Canada.

People from around the world traveled to see the eclipse from the small portion of Britain from which it could be seen, with the Independent saying: "A timely gap in the clouds was all it took to make the arduous journey to the northernmost reaches of Scotland worthwhile". In the village of Durness, the eclipse was observed by Patrick Moore and Brian May. However, viewing parties in Orkney saw "just another grey morning in the far north of Scotland". In India, hundreds of thousands of Hindus carried out a tradition of bathing in sacred rivers during the eclipse, with queues as long as 3 mi (4.8 km). A partial eclipse was observed in large parts of Asia, the Middle East, and Europe, including Greece.

== Images ==
Animated path

== Eclipse timing ==
=== Places experiencing annular eclipse ===
Solar Eclipse of May 31, 2003 (Local Times)
Country or territory	City or place	Start of partial eclipse	Start of annular eclipse	Maximum eclipse	End of annular eclipse	End of partial eclipse	Duration of annularity (min:s)	Duration of eclipse (hr:min)	Maximum coverage
United Kingdom	Fort William	04:38:23 (sunrise)	04:44:49	04:45:17	04:45:43	05:42:15	0:54	1:04	88.04%
United Kingdom	Inverness	04:29:58 (sunrise)	04:44:59	04:45:32	04:46:06	05:42:50	1:07	1:13	88.08%
United Kingdom	Portree	04:38:20 (sunrise)	04:45:44	04:46:42	04:47:40	05:43:42	1:56	1:05	88.05%
United Kingdom	Kirkwall	04:12:41 (sunrise)	04:45:54	04:46:43	04:47:31	05:44:38	1:37	1:32	88.16%
United Kingdom	Lerwick	03:54:39 (sunrise)	04:46:37	04:47:16	04:47:56	05:45:48	1:19	1:51	88.23%
United Kingdom	Stornoway	04:32:53 (sunrise)	04:46:38	04:47:49	04:48:59	05:45:00	2:21	1:12	88.08%
Faroe Islands	Tórshavn	03:56:52 (sunrise)	04:51:18	04:52:52	04:54:26	05:51:06	3:08	1:54	88.22%
Faroe Islands	Klaksvík	03:56:42	04:51:29	04:53:03	04:54:36	05:51:22	3:07	1:58	88.23%
Iceland	Höfn	03:04:13	03:58:38	04:00:26	04:02:13	04:58:14	3:35	1:54	88.20%
Iceland	Egilsstaðir	03:04:33	03:59:23	04:01:10	04:02:57	04:59:24	3:34	1:55	88.25%
Iceland	Kirkjubæjarklaustur	03:17:13 (sunrise)	03:59:46	04:01:34	04:03:22	04:58:55	3:36	1:42	88.15%
Iceland	Vestmannaeyjar	03:31:27 (sunrise)	04:00:45	04:02:32	04:04:20	04:59:32	3:35	1:28	88.11%
Iceland	Húsavík	03:07:04	04:01:55	04:03:43	04:05:30	05:01:51	3:35	1:55	88.25%
Iceland	Akureyri	03:07:15	04:01:55	04:03:43	04:05:31	05:01:40	3:36	1:54	88.23%
Iceland	Reykjavík	03:26:44 (sunrise)	04:02:30	04:04:18	04:06:06	05:01:21	3:36	1:35	88.12%
Iceland	Keflavík	03:31:38 (sunrise)	04:02:44	04:04:31	04:06:19	05:01:28	3:35	1:30	88.11%
Iceland	Borgarnes	03:19:07 (sunrise)	04:02:55	04:04:42	04:06:30	05:31:53	3:35	1:43	88.14%
Svalbard and Jan Mayen	Jan Mayen	05:06:36	06:04:38	06:05:41	06:06:45	07:06:24	2:07	2:00	88.54%
Iceland	Hólmavík	03:09:33	04:03:59	04:05:47	04:07:35	05:03:21	3:36	1:54	88.19%
Iceland	Ísafjörður	03:10:44	04:05:12	04:07:00	04:08:48	05:04:33	3:36	1:54	88.19%
Greenland	Ittoqqortoormiit	03:13:13	04:09:25	04:11:08	04:12:50	05:10:16	3:25	1:57	88.39%
Greenland	Daneborg	01:15:21	02:14:12	02:14:48	02:15:24	03:15:23	1:12	2:00	88.56%
Greenland	Tasiilaq	01:59:07 (sunrise)	02:13:43	02:15:31	02:17:18	03:11:43	3:35	1:13	88.06%
Greenland	Summit Camp	01:23:09	02:19:41	02:21:07	02:22:34	03:19:48	2:53	1:57	88.37%
Greenland	Kangerlussuaq	02:00:21 (sunrise)	02:23:14	02:25:39	02:26:22	03:20:46	3:08	1:20	88.06%
Greenland	Ilulissat	01:29:38	02:24:35	02:26:01	02:27:28	03:22:48	2:53	1:53	88.16%
Greenland	Aasiaat	01:30:42	02:25:30	02:26:53	02:28:15	03:23:23	2:45	1:53	88.13%
Greenland	Uummannaq	01:30:18	02:26:03	02:27:15	02:28:26	03:24:31	2:23	1:54	88.22%
Greenland	Qeqertarsuaq	01:31:06	02:26:13	02:27:29	02:28:46	03:24:11	2:33	1:53	88.15%

=== Places experiencing partial eclipse ===
Solar Eclipse of May 31, 2003 (Local Times)
Country or territory	City or place	Start of partial eclipse	Maximum eclipse	End of partial eclipse	Duration of eclipse (hr:min)	Maximum coverage
Bulgaria	Sofia	05:52:12 (sunrise)	06:08:26	07:06:05	1:14	66.28%
Romania	Bucharest	05:35:09 (sunrise)	06:09:28	07:08:18	1:33	66.76%
Serbia	Belgrade	04:56:20 (sunrise)	05:13:08	06:11:02	1:15	70.47%
Bosnia and Herzegovina	Sarajevo	05:08:01 (sunrise)	05:16:54	06:10:12	1:02	69.08%
Ukraine	Kyiv	05:19:27	06:17:12	07:19:01	2:00	70.28%
Croatia	Zagreb	05:10:35 (sunrise)	05:17:14	06:14:38	1:04	73.87%
Hungary	Budapest	04:51:42 (sunrise)	05:17:49	06:16:21	1:25	74.13%
Slovenia	Ljubljana	05:15:34 (sunrise)	05:19:10	06:15:42	1:00	74.76%
Slovakia	Bratislava	04:56:45 (sunrise)	05:19:53	06:18:15	1:22	75.76%
Austria	Vienna	04:59:28 (sunrise)	05:20:23	06:18:38	1:19	76.17%
Poland	Warsaw	04:27:11	05:24:04	06:24:28	1:57	77.38%
Belarus	Minsk	05:25:48	06:24:12	07:26:26	2:01	75.00%
Czech Republic	Prague	04:58:58 (sunrise)	05:24:13	06:22:40	1:24	78.78%
Russia	Moscow	06:24:23	07:24:56	08:29:49	2:05	69.86%
Lithuania	Vilnius	05:28:04	06:26:21	07:28:19	2:00	76.85%
Germany	Berlin	04:51:04 (sunrise)	05:28:21	06:27:18	1:36	81.15%
Latvia	Riga	05:31:55	06:30:41	07:33:01	2:01	78.89%
Netherlands	Amsterdam	05:25:44 (sunrise)	05:33:09	06:30:30	1:05	84.09%
Denmark	Copenhagen	04:36:49	05:33:31	06:33:12	1:58	83.46%
Estonia	Tallinn	05:35:17	06:34:53	07:37:57	2:03	79.80%
Finland	Helsinki	05:36:18	06:36:08	07:39:25	2:03	80.01%
Sweden	Stockholm	04:38:24	05:36:58	06:38:40	2:00	82.90%
Luxembourg	Luxembourg	05:34:18 (sunrise)	05:38:37	06:25:29	0:51	69.58%
Belgium	Brussels	05:35:37 (sunrise)	05:39:46	06:28:19	0:53	73.33%
Norway	Oslo	04:43:16	05:40:57	06:41:25	1:58	85.86%
United Kingdom	Edinburgh	04:36:46 (sunrise)	04:42:57	05:39:59	1:03	87.74%
United Kingdom	London	04:50:16 (sunrise)	04:57:26	05:31:37	0:41	46.99%
Greenland	Danmarkshavn	03:16:50	04:17:18	05:18:50	2:02	87.68%
Greenland	Pituffik	00:37:17	01:36:39	02:35:54	1:59	85.09%
Canada	Pond Inlet	23:43:34 (Note: The time listed here for this location occurs on May 30, 2003, local time.)	00:41:33	01:39:08	1:56	84.31%

== Gallery ==
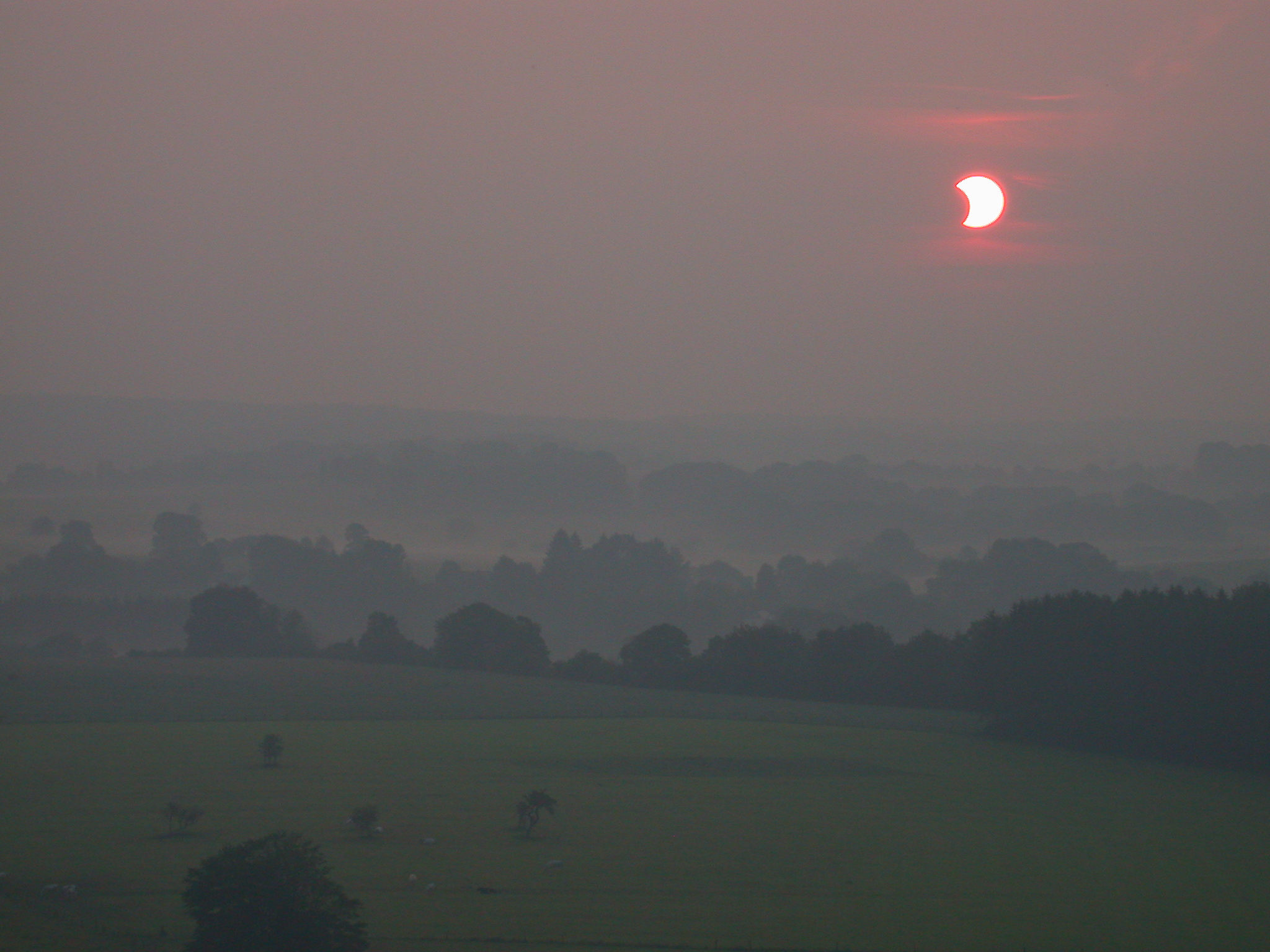
Chassepierre, Belgium

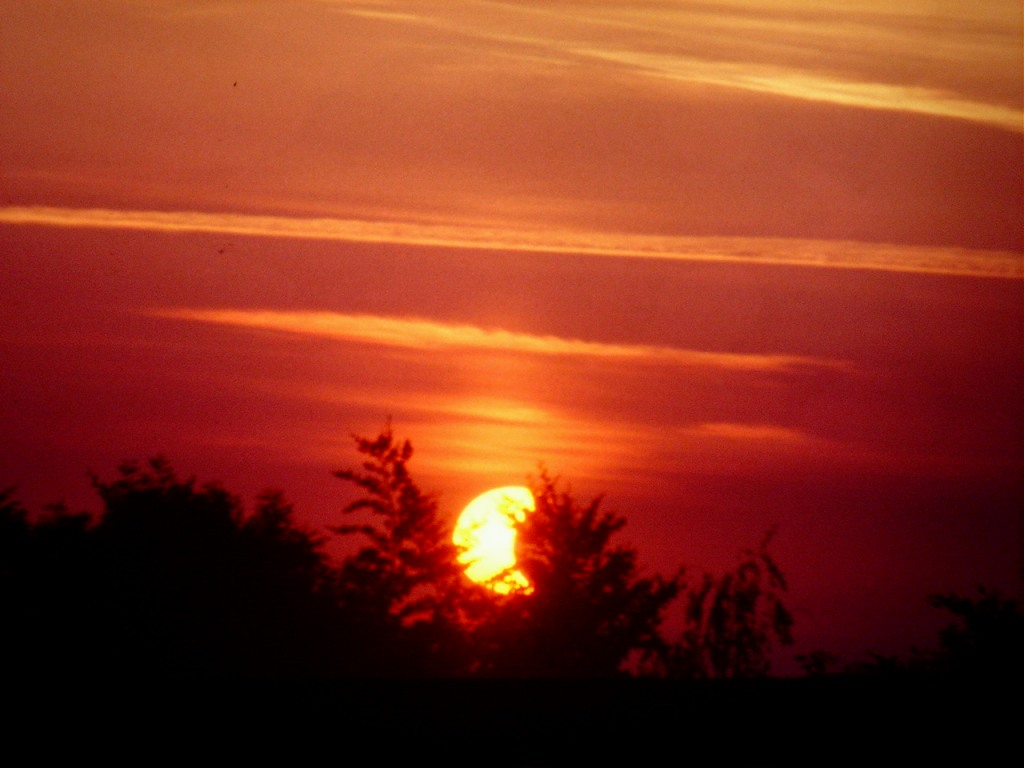
From Belfort, France

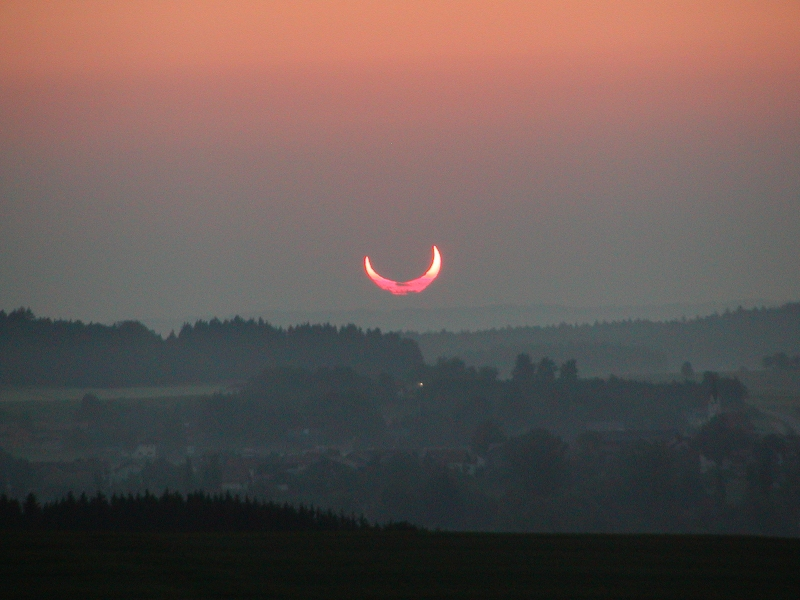
Wonneberg, Germany

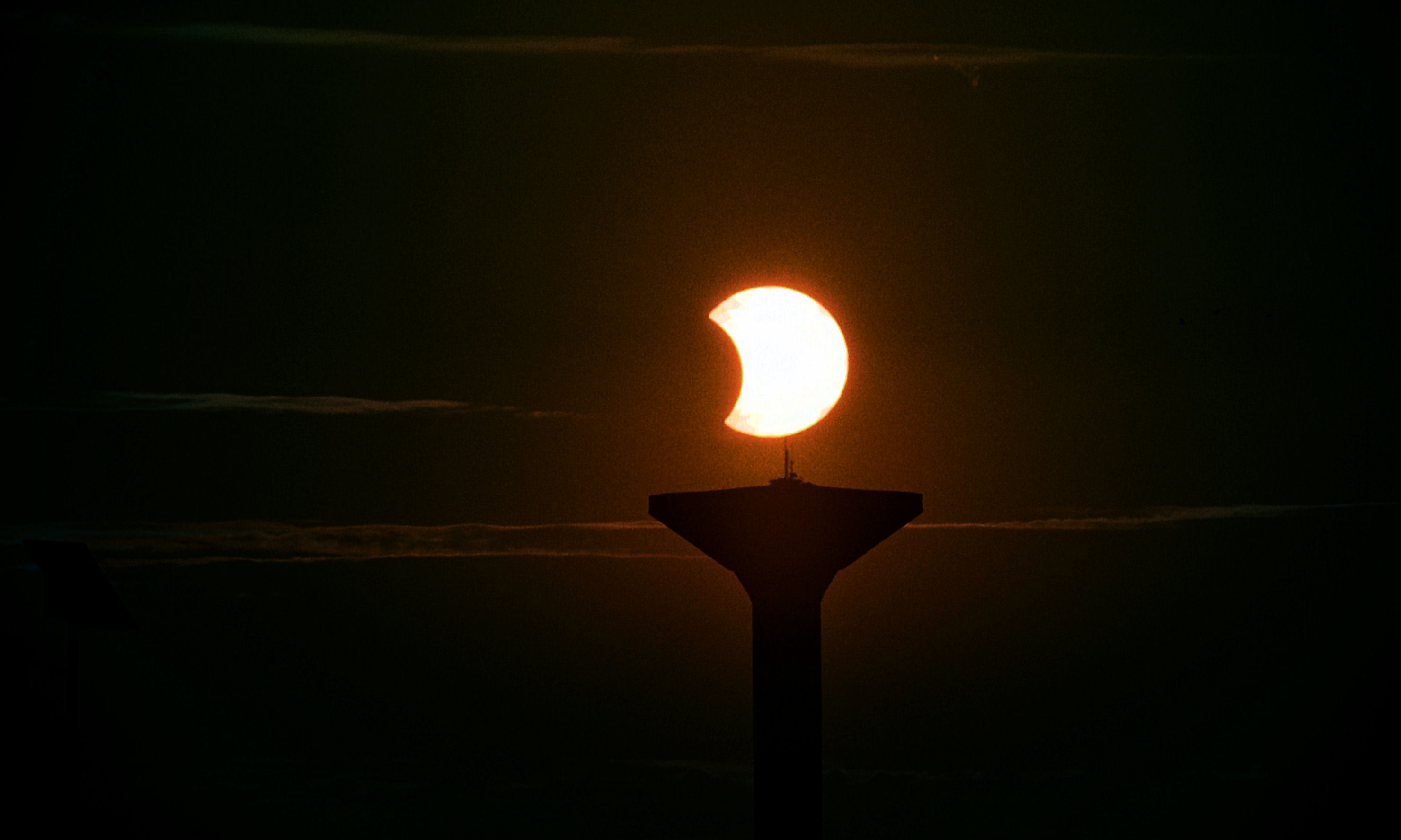
From Oria, Italy

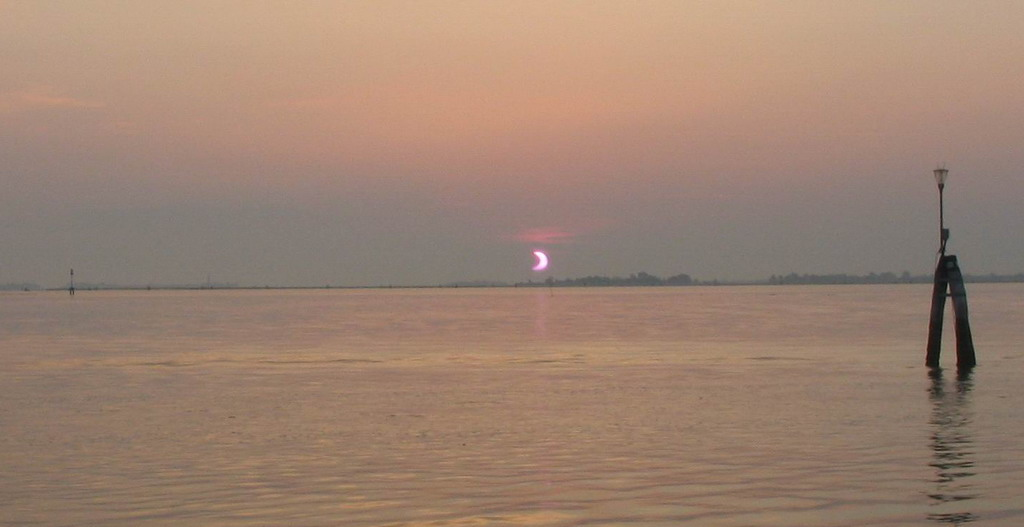
From Venice, Italy

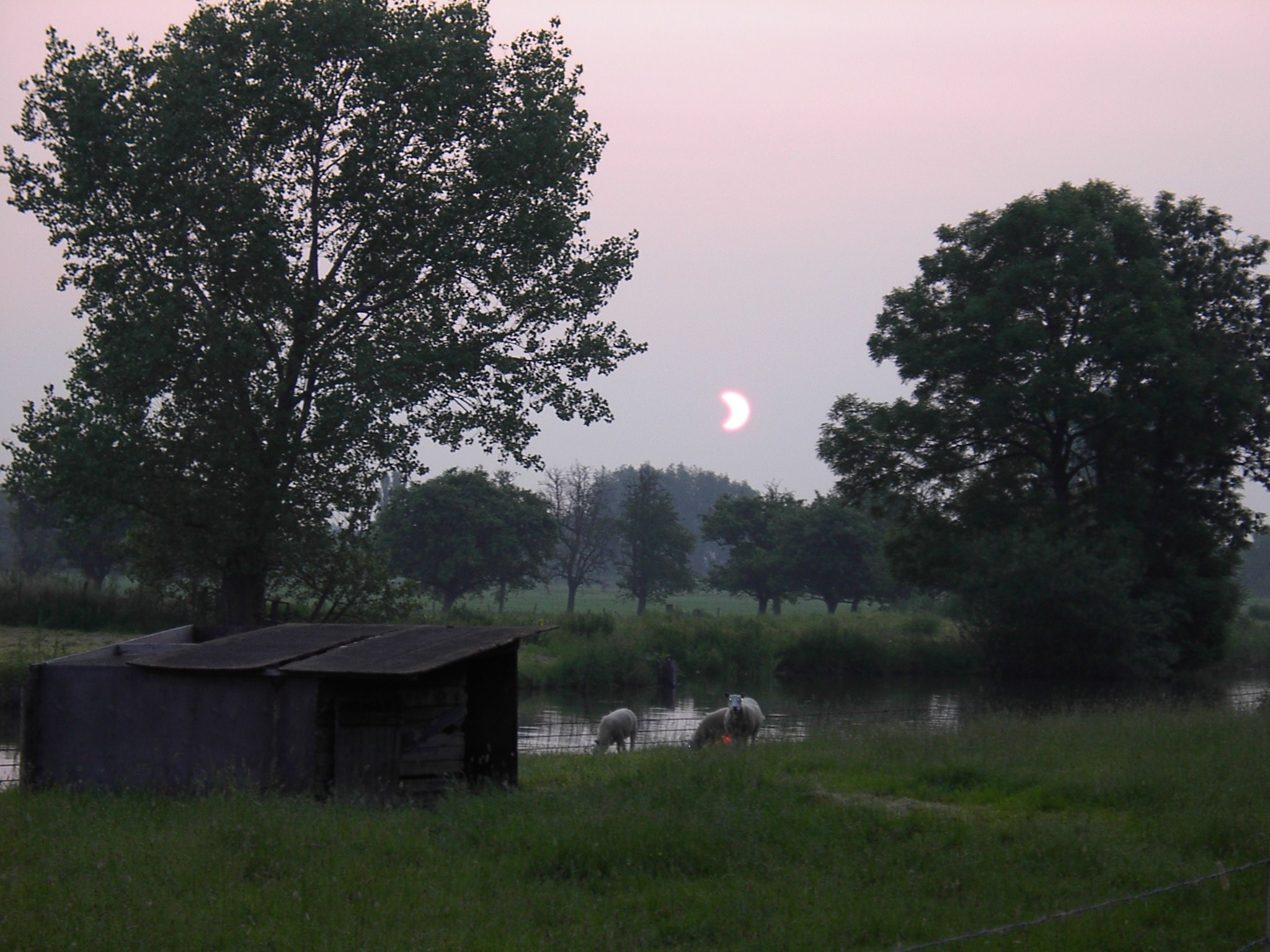
Willeskop, Netherlands

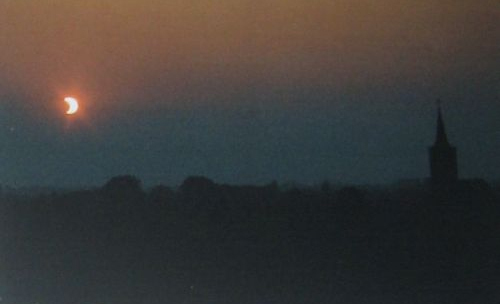
Leiden, Netherlands

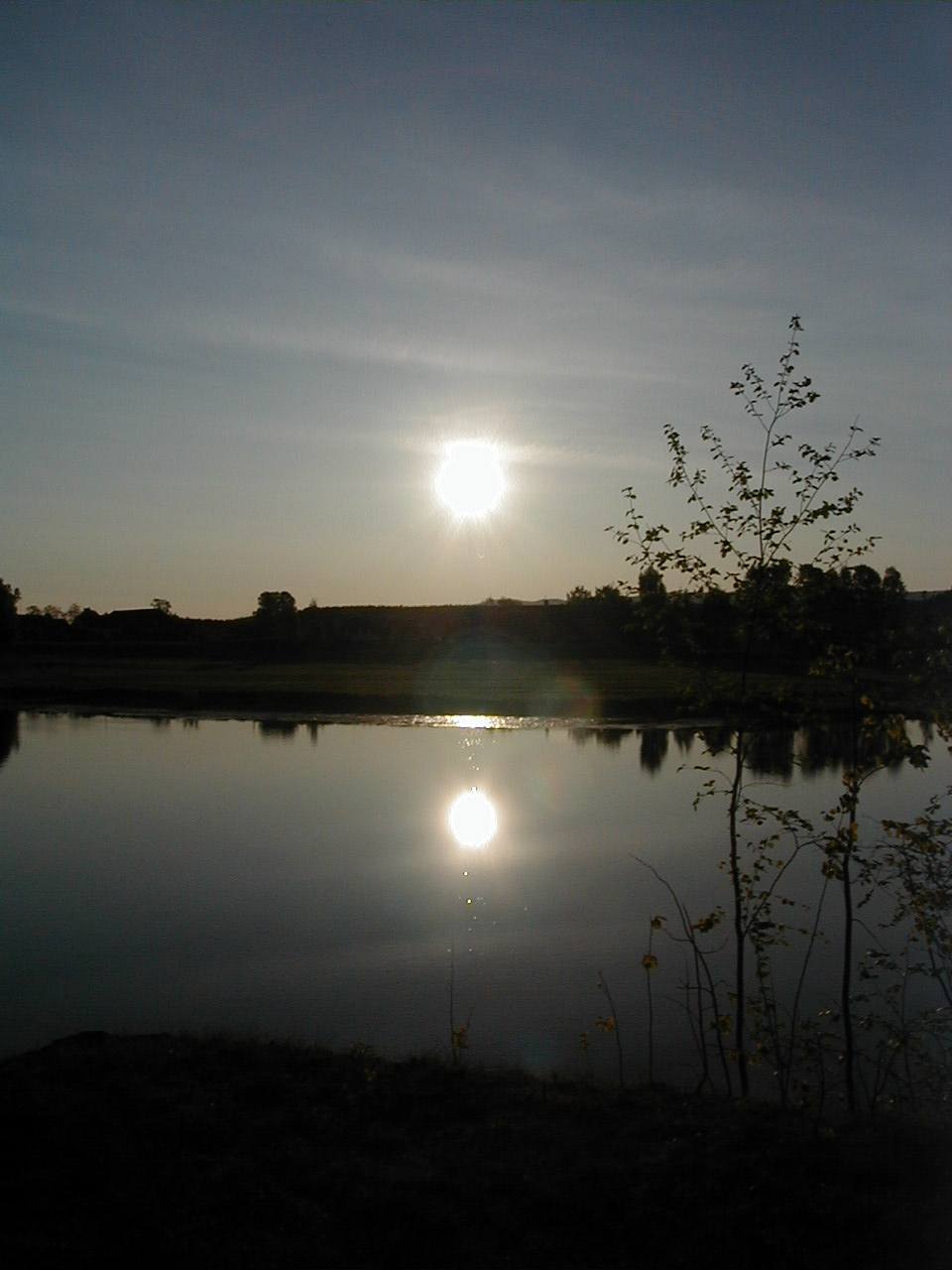
From Ringerike, Norway

Grantown-on-Spey, Scotland

== Eclipse details ==
Shown below are two tables displaying details about this particular solar eclipse. The first table outlines times at which the Moon's penumbra or umbra attains the specific parameter, and the second table describes various other parameters pertaining to this eclipse.

May 31, 2003 Solar Eclipse Times
Event	Time (UTC)
First Penumbral External Contact	2003 May 31 at 01:47:21.0 UTC
First Umbral External Contact	2003 May 31 at 03:45:50.6 UTC
First Central Line	2003 May 31 at 04:03:10.1 UTC
Greatest Duration	2003 May 31 at 04:08:58.5 UTC
Greatest Eclipse	2003 May 31 at 04:09:22.5 UTC
Last Central Line	2003 May 31 at 04:15:15.4 UTC
Ecliptic Conjunction	2003 May 31 at 04:20:57.2 UTC
Last Umbral External Contact	2003 May 31 at 04:32:33.6 UTC
Equatorial Conjunction	2003 May 31 at 04:39:20.5 UTC
Last Penumbral External Contact	2003 May 31 at 06:31:08.5 UTC

May 31, 2003 Solar Eclipse Parameters
Parameter	Value
Eclipse Magnitude	0.93842
Eclipse Obscuration	0.88064
Gamma	0.99597
Sun Right Ascension	04h30m33.5s
Sun Declination	+21°50'57.1"
Sun Semi-Diameter	15'46.5"
Sun Equatorial Horizontal Parallax	08.7"
Moon Right Ascension	04h29m35.5s
Moon Declination	+22°43'13.1"
Moon Semi-Diameter	14'48.1"
Moon Equatorial Horizontal Parallax	0°54'19.3"
ΔT	64.5 s

== Eclipse season ==
This eclipse is part of an eclipse season, a period, roughly every six months, when eclipses occur. Only two (or occasionally three) eclipse seasons occur each year, and each season lasts about 35 days and repeats just short of six months (173 days) later; thus two full eclipse seasons always occur each year. Either two or three eclipses happen each eclipse season. In the sequence below, each eclipse is separated by a fortnight.

Eclipse season of May 2003
May 16 Descending node (full moon)	May 31 Ascending node (new moon)
Total lunar eclipse Lunar Saros 121	Annular solar eclipse Solar Saros 147

== Related eclipses ==
=== Eclipses in 2003 ===
- A total lunar eclipse on May 16.
- An annular solar eclipse on May 31.
- A total lunar eclipse on November 9.
- A total solar eclipse on November 23.

=== Metonic ===
- Preceded by: Solar eclipse of August 11, 1999
- Followed by: Solar eclipse of March 19, 2007

=== Tzolkinex ===
- Preceded by: Solar eclipse of April 17, 1996
- Followed by: Solar eclipse of July 11, 2010

=== Half-Saros ===
- Preceded by: Lunar eclipse of May 25, 1994
- Followed by: Lunar eclipse of June 4, 2012

=== Tritos ===
- Preceded by: Solar eclipse of June 30, 1992
- Followed by: Solar eclipse of April 29, 2014

=== Solar Saros 147 ===
- Preceded by: Solar eclipse of May 19, 1985
- Followed by: Solar eclipse of June 10, 2021

=== Inex ===
- Preceded by: Solar eclipse of June 20, 1974
- Followed by: Solar eclipse of May 9, 2032

=== Triad ===
- Preceded by: Solar eclipse of July 30, 1916
- Followed by: Solar eclipse of March 31, 2090

=== Solar eclipses of 2000–2003 ===
This eclipse is a member of a semester series. An eclipse in a semester series of solar eclipses repeats approximately every 177 days and 4 hours (a semester) at alternating nodes of the Moon's orbit.

The partial solar eclipses on February 5, 2000 and July 31, 2000 occur in the previous lunar year eclipse set.

Solar eclipse series sets from 2000 to 2003
Ascending node			Descending node		
Saros	Map	Gamma	Saros	Map	Gamma
117	July 1, 2000 Partial	−1.28214	122 Partial projection in Minneapolis, MN, USA	December 25, 2000 Partial	1.13669
127 Totality in Lusaka, Zambia	June 21, 2001 Total	−0.57013	132 Partial in Minneapolis, MN, USA	December 14, 2001 Annular	0.40885
137 Partial in Los Angeles, CA, USA	June 10, 2002 Annular	0.19933	142 Totality in Woomera, South Australia	December 4, 2002 Total	−0.30204
147 Annularity in Culloden, Scotland	May 31, 2003 Annular	0.99598	152	November 23, 2003 Total	−0.96381

=== Saros 147 ===
This eclipse is a part of Saros series 147, repeating every 18 years, 11 days, and containing 80 events. The series started with a partial solar eclipse on October 12, 1624. It contains annular eclipses from May 31, 2003 through July 31, 2706. There are no hybrid or total eclipses in this set. The series ends at member 80 as a partial eclipse on February 24, 3049. Its eclipses are tabulated in three columns; every third eclipse in the same column is one exeligmos apart, so they all cast shadows over approximately the same parts of the Earth.

The longest duration of annularity will be produced by member 38 at 9 minutes, 41 seconds on November 21, 2291. All eclipses in this series occur at the Moon’s ascending node of orbit.

Series members 11–32 occur between 1801 and 2200:
11	12	13
January 30, 1805	February 11, 1823	February 21, 1841
14	15	16
March 4, 1859	March 15, 1877	March 26, 1895
17	18	19
April 6, 1913	April 18, 1931	April 28, 1949
20	21	22
May 9, 1967	May 19, 1985	May 31, 2003
23	24	25
June 10, 2021	June 21, 2039	July 1, 2057
26	27	28
July 13, 2075	July 23, 2093	August 4, 2111
29	30	31
August 15, 2129	August 26, 2147	September 5, 2165
32
September 16, 2183

=== Metonic series ===
The metonic series repeats eclipses every 19 years (6939.69 days), lasting about 5 cycles. Eclipses occur in nearly the same calendar date. In addition, the octon subseries repeats 1/5 of that or every 3.8 years (1387.94 days). All eclipses in this table occur at the Moon's ascending node.

22 eclipse events between January 5, 1935 and August 11, 2018
January 4–5	October 23–24	August 10–12	May 30–31	March 18–19
111	113	115	117	119
January 5, 1935		August 12, 1942	May 30, 1946	March 18, 1950
121	123	125	127	129
January 5, 1954	October 23, 1957	August 11, 1961	May 30, 1965	March 18, 1969
131	133	135	137	139
January 4, 1973	October 23, 1976	August 10, 1980	May 30, 1984	March 18, 1988
141	143	145	147	149
January 4, 1992	October 24, 1995	August 11, 1999	May 31, 2003	March 19, 2007
151	153	155		
January 4, 2011	October 23, 2014	August 11, 2018		

=== Tritos series ===
This eclipse is a part of a tritos cycle, repeating at alternating nodes every 135 synodic months (≈ 3986.63 days, or 11 years minus 1 month). Their appearance and longitude are irregular due to a lack of synchronization with the anomalistic month (period of perigee), but groupings of 3 tritos cycles (≈ 33 years minus 3 months) come close (≈ 434.044 anomalistic months), so eclipses are similar in these groupings.

The partial solar eclipses on December 18, 2188 (part of Saros 164) and November 18, 2199 (part of Saros 165) are also a part of this series but are not included in the table below.

Series members between 1801 and 2134
December 10, 1806 (Saros 129)	November 9, 1817 (Saros 130)	October 9, 1828 (Saros 131)	September 7, 1839 (Saros 132)	August 7, 1850 (Saros 133)
July 8, 1861 (Saros 134)	June 6, 1872 (Saros 135)	May 6, 1883 (Saros 136)	April 6, 1894 (Saros 137)	March 6, 1905 (Saros 138)
February 3, 1916 (Saros 139)	January 3, 1927 (Saros 140)	December 2, 1937 (Saros 141)	November 1, 1948 (Saros 142)	October 2, 1959 (Saros 143)
August 31, 1970 (Saros 144)	July 31, 1981 (Saros 145)	June 30, 1992 (Saros 146)	May 31, 2003 (Saros 147)	April 29, 2014 (Saros 148)
March 29, 2025 (Saros 149)	February 27, 2036 (Saros 150)	January 26, 2047 (Saros 151)	December 26, 2057 (Saros 152)	November 24, 2068 (Saros 153)
October 24, 2079 (Saros 154)	September 23, 2090 (Saros 155)	August 24, 2101 (Saros 156)	July 23, 2112 (Saros 157)	June 23, 2123 (Saros 158)
May 23, 2134 (Saros 159)

=== Inex series ===
This eclipse is a part of the long period inex cycle, repeating at alternating nodes, every 358 synodic months (≈ 10,571.95 days, or 29 years minus 20 days). Their appearance and longitude are irregular due to a lack of synchronization with the anomalistic month (period of perigee). However, groupings of 3 inex cycles (≈ 87 years minus 2 months) comes close (≈ 1,151.02 anomalistic months), so eclipses are similar in these groupings.

Series members between 1801 and 2200
September 28, 1829 (Saros 141)	September 7, 1858 (Saros 142)	August 19, 1887 (Saros 143)
July 30, 1916 (Saros 144)	July 9, 1945 (Saros 145)	June 20, 1974 (Saros 146)
May 31, 2003 (Saros 147)	May 9, 2032 (Saros 148)	April 20, 2061 (Saros 149)
March 31, 2090 (Saros 150)	March 11, 2119 (Saros 151)	February 19, 2148 (Saros 152)
January 29, 2177 (Saros 153)		

== See also ==
- List of solar eclipses visible from the United Kingdom 1000–2090 AD
