= SV Kirchanschöring =

German football club

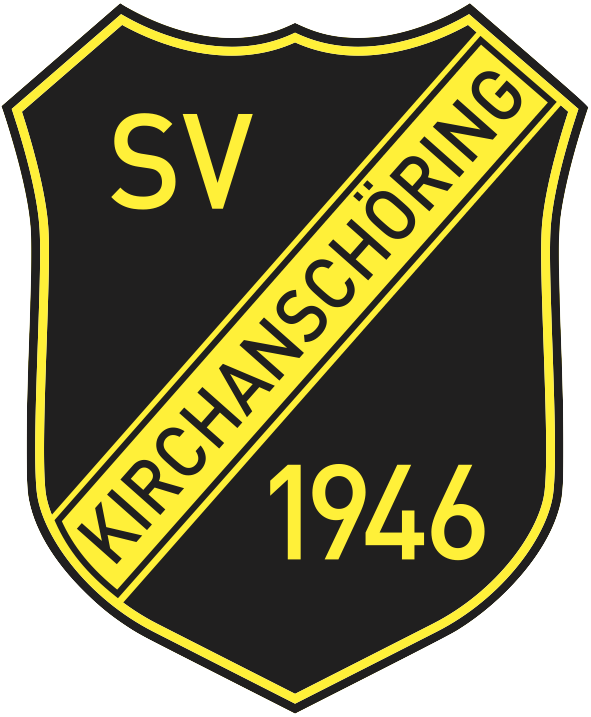
- Full name: Sportverein Kirchanschöring e.V. 1946
- Founded: 1946; 80 years ago
- Ground: Stadion an der Laufener Straße
- Chairman: Lars Zehentner
- Manager: Thomas Leberfinger
- League: Bayernliga Süd (V)
- 2025–26: Bayernliga Süd, 3rd of 17
Home colours	Away colours

SV Kirchanschöring is a German association football club from the municipality of Kirchanschöring, Bavaria. The club's greatest success has been promotion to the tier five Bayernliga in 2015.

== History ==
The club was formed in September 1946 and spend the first three decades of its existence in lower amateur football. An early highlight for the club was a friendly against FC Bayern Munich, in front of 7,000 spectators, as a farewell match for Bernd Dürnberger who had come out of SV Kirchanschöring youth department and joined Bayern.

SV Kirchanschöring won promotion to the tier five Bezirksliga Oberbayern-Ost in 1975 and won this league in its first season there. The club played the 1976–77 season in the Landesliga Bayern-Süd but could only finish fifteenth and was promptly relegated again.

Kirchanschöring played in the Bezirksliga or the A-Klasse below for the next 25 years. It was relegated from the Bezirksliga in 1987 and 1991 but returned in 1988 and 1998 and won a second title in the league in 2001–02.

The club played the 2002–03 season in the Bezirksoberliga Oberbayern but was relegated after finishing fourteenth. It returned to the Bezirksoberliga the season after and played at this level for the next seven seasons mostly as a mid-table side. In 2010–11 a runners-up finish allowed the club participation in the promotion round to the Landesliga in which the club secured another promotion.

Its second stint in the Landesliga Bayern-Süd was no more successful than its first with SV Kirchanschöring coming sixteenth in 2011–12, the last season of the league. As the Landesligas were enlarged in numbers from three to five however the club was not relegated but qualified for the new southeast division instead.

The club became a founding member of the Landesliga Bayern-Südost in 2012 and played the next three seasons at this level. After finishing sixth and fifth in its first two season there Kirchanschöring won the league in 2014–15 and earned promotion to the Bayernliga for the first time.

== Honours ==
The club's honours:

- Landesliga Bayern-Südost
  - Champions: 2015
- Bezirksliga Oberbayern-Ost
  - Champions: 1976, 2002
  - Runners-up: 2004

== Recent seasons ==
The recent season-by-season performance of the club:

Season	Division	Tier	Position
2001–02	Bezirksliga Oberbayern-Ost	VII	1st ↑
2002–03	Bezirksoberliga Oberbayern	VI	14th ↓
2003–04	Bezirksliga Oberbayern-Ost	VII	2nd ↑
2004–05	Bezirksoberliga Oberbayern	VI	10th
2005–06	Bezirksoberliga Oberbayern	VI	7th
2006–07	Bezirksoberliga Oberbayern	VI	11th
2007–08	Bezirksoberliga Oberbayern	VI	4th
2008–09	Bezirksoberliga Oberbayern	VII	7th
2009–10	Bezirksoberliga Oberbayern	VII	9th
2010–11	Bezirksoberliga Oberbayern	VII	2nd ↑
2011–12	Landesliga Bayern-Süd	VI	16th
2012–13	Landesliga Bayern-Südost	VI	6th
2013–14	Landesliga Bayern-Südost	VI	5th
2014–15	Landesliga Bayern-Südost	VI	1st ↑
2015–16	Bayernliga Süd	V	7th
2016–17	Bayernliga Süd	V	8th
2017–18	Bayernliga Süd	V	16th
2018–19	Bayernliga Süd	V	11th
2019–20	Bayernliga Süd	V	9th
2020–21	Bayernliga Süd	V	*Corona
2021–22	Bayernliga Süd	V	5th
2022–23	Bayernliga Süd	V	6th
2023–24	Bayernliga Süd	V	12th
2024–25	Bayernliga Süd	V	7th
2025–26	Bayernliga Süd	V	3rd

- With the introduction of the Regionalligas in 1994 and the 3. Liga in 2008 as the new third tier, below the 2. Bundesliga, all leagues below dropped one tier.

↑ Promoted	↓ Relegated
