= Abtsdorfer See =

Lake in Bavaria, Germany

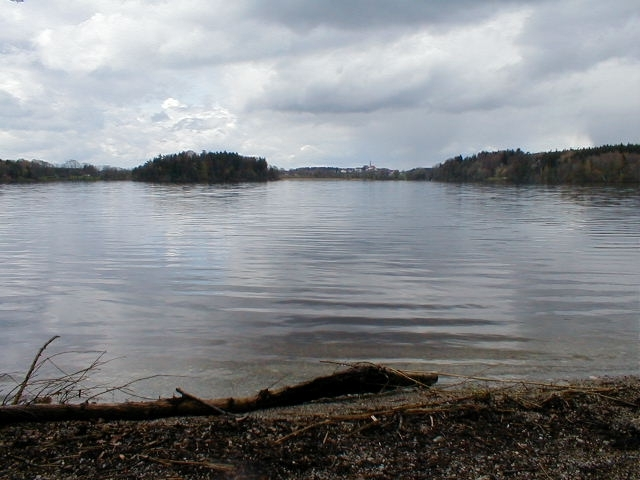

- Location within Bavaria
- Location: Bavaria
- Coordinates: 47°54′38″N 12°54′28″E
- Primary inflows: Weidmoosgraben, Gaberlbach, Roßgraben, Badhäuslgraben
- Primary outflows: Schinderbach (northeast)
- Catchment area: 21.30 km^{2} (8.22 sq mi)
- Basin countries: Germany
- Max. length: 1,568 m (5,144 ft)
- Max. width: 968 m (3,176 ft)
- Surface area: 0.84 km^{2} (0.32 sq mi)
- Average depth: 11.25 m (36.9 ft)
- Max. depth: 20 m (66 ft)
- Water volume: 9,423,000 m^{3} (332,800,000 cu ft)
- Shore length^{1}: 4.18 km (2.60 mi)
- Surface elevation: 426.20 m (1,398.3 ft)
- Islands: one island (Burgstall)
- ^{1} Shore length is not a well-defined measure.

Abtsdorfer See is a lake in the region of Rupertiwinkel in Bavaria, Germany. At an elevation of 426.20 m, its surface area is 0.84 km².

== Sources ==
- Nixdorf, B.; et al. (2004), "Abtsdorfer See", Dokumentation von Zustand und Entwicklung der wichtigsten Seen Deutschlands (in German), Berlin: Umweltbundesamt, p. 6
