= Alfons Schuhbeck =

German chef, TV cook and businessman

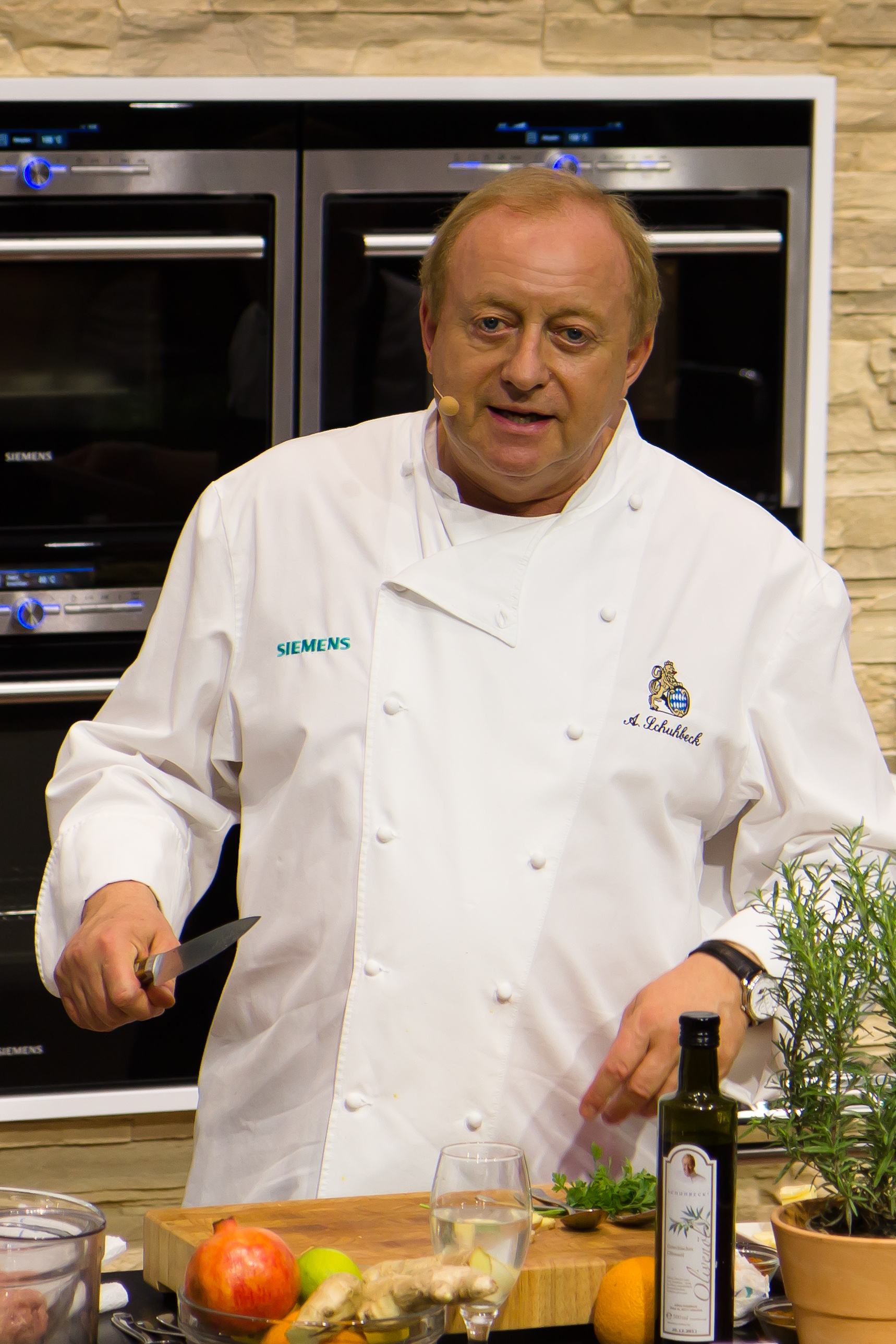
- Schuhbeck in 2011
- Born: Alfons Karg; 2 May 1949 (age 77); Traunstein, Bavaria, Germany
- Education: College of Hotel Management Bad Reichenhall; Feinkost Käfer; Dallmayr; Restaurant Aubergine (Witzigmann)
- Culinary career
- Cooking style: South German cuisine
- Rating(s): Michelin stars American Academy of Hospitality Sciences Mobil Good Food Guide
- Current restaurant(s): Südtiroler Stuben Check Inn
- Television show: Meine Bayerische Küche
- Website: schuhbeck.de

Alfons Schuhbeck (born Alfons Karg; 2 May 1949) is one of Germany's top chefs, as well as being a restaurateur, celebrity chef, author and businessman.

== Education ==
Born Alfons Karg, Schuhbeck trained as a telecommunications technician, but soon became disenchanted with this profession. While playing with his band in the Bavarian holiday resort of Waging am See, he ran into the restaurateur Sebastian Schuhbeck, who committed Alfons in a career in the hospitality business and became his mentor. Sebastian Schuhbeck later adopted Alfons and made him his heir.

Schuhbeck studied at the College of Hotel Management Bad Reichenhall in Bavaria. After that, he went through practical training in Salzburg, Geneva, Paris, London and Munich (in Eckart Witzigmanns three stars awarded Aubergine).

== Career ==
Schuhbeck finally took the Kurhausstüberl from Sebastian Schuhbeck in 1980. He was the driving force in his mentor's business. His chef skills impressed the guests of the Kurhausstüberl in a way that this former village inn became a favourite restaurant for the upper society of Munich and Salzburg.

In 1983, Schuhbeck was awarded with one star in the French Michelin Guide, as the third chef outside France at this time. The also French Gault Millau restaurant guide gave him 17 points and 3 hoods and elected him Cook of the Year in 1989.

Since 1990, Schuhbeck has operated a catering service and supplied many first-class events like the Federal Chancellor's celebration, the Ball des Sports and the German music industry's ECHO award ceremony.

In 2003, he established a new restaurant, the Südtiroler Stuben in Munich. There, he won his second Michelin star in December 2003. In November 2005, he was awarded with the Five Star Diamond Award by the American Academy of Hospitality Sciences.

German TV broadcaster Bayerischer Rundfunk has aired Schuhbeck's show Schuhbecks since 1993. His popularity in Germany results in this as well as publishing more than 20 books about cooking. He is also a regular guest in other German TV shows.

The lockdown resulting from the COVID-19 pandemic in 2020 and 2021 caused Schuhbeck's business to suffer. After futilely waiting for government relief to arrive, he eventually announced that he had filed for bankruptcy on 18 July 2021.

=== Businesses ===
At the end of the 1990s, he set up Schuhbecks GmbH. This company included the restaurant Südtiroler Stuben, a wine bistro, a catering service, a cookery school, a spice shop and an ice-cream parlour, all based in Munich. Schuhbeck Check Inn GmbH was formed in 2001 to manage the Check Inn restaurant and bar in Egelsbach (south Hesse).

== Tax evasion and imprisonment ==
In October 2022, Schuhbeck was sentenced to three years and two months in prison for tax evasion.
