= Thomas Leberfinger =

German footballer

Personal information
- Date of birth: 5 January 1990 (age 36)
- Place of birth: Deggendorf, Germany
- Height: 1.85 m (6 ft 1 in)
- Positions: Defender; midfielder

Team information
- Current team: Kirchanschöring
- Number: 4

Youth career
- –2007: TSV 1860 Rosenheim
- 2006–2009: Wacker Burghausen

Senior career*
Years	Team	Apps	(Gls)
2009–2015	Wacker Burghausen	66	(0)
2012–2014	→ Wacker Burghausen II	51	(8)
2015–2022	TSV Buchbach	118	(5)
2022–	Kirchanschöring	13	(3)
- * Club domestic league appearances and goals as of 13 November 2022

Thomas Leberfinger (born 5 January 1990) is a German former professional footballer. He played as a centre-back for Kirchanschöring.
