= Piding =

- Municipality
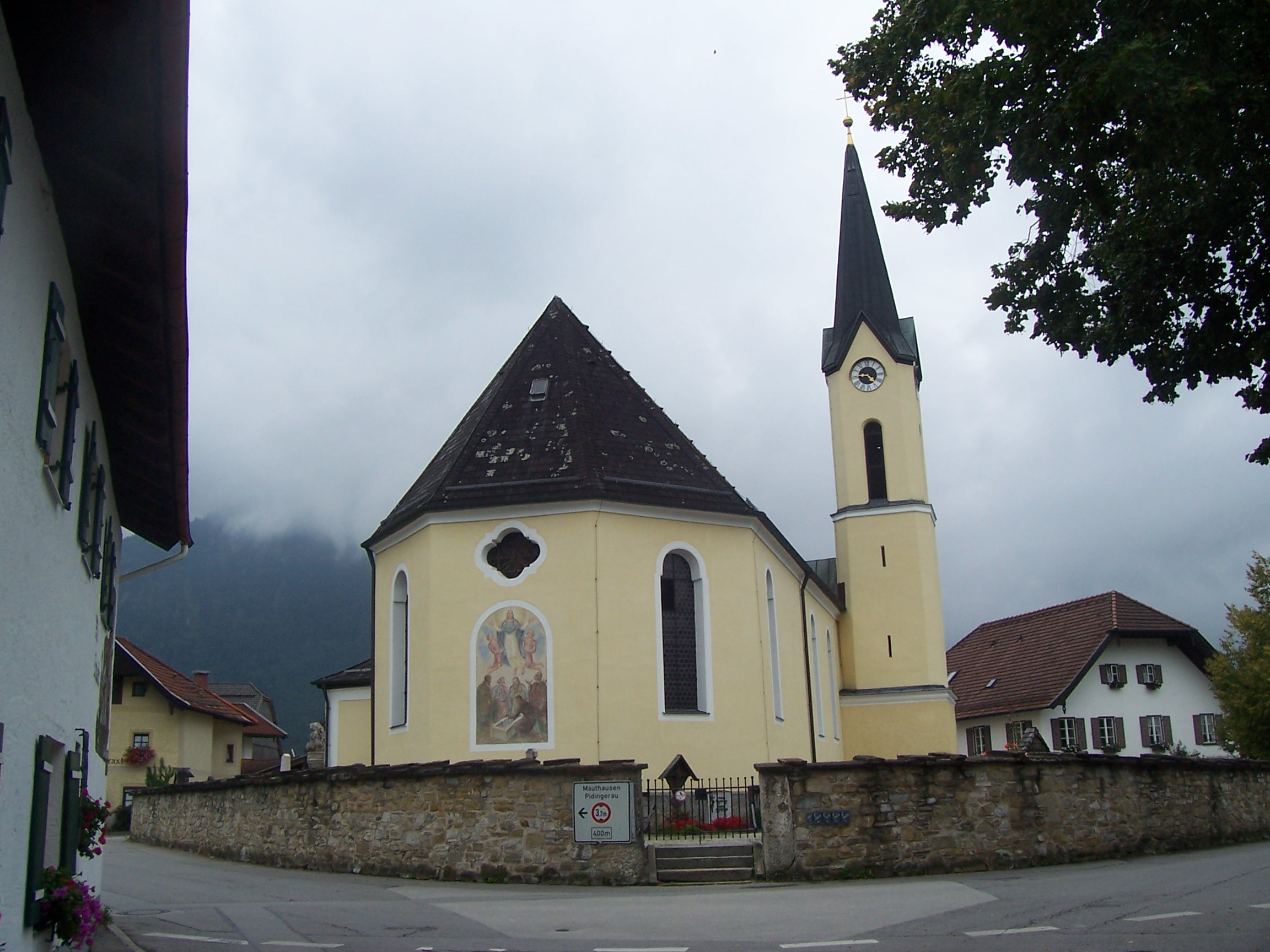
- Church of the Birth of the Virgin Mary

- Coat of arms

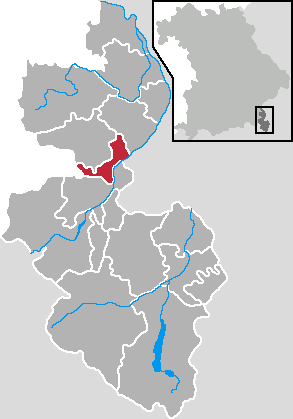
- Location of Piding within Berchtesgadener Land district
- Interactive map of Piding
- Location within Germany Location within Bavaria
- Coordinates: 47°46′N 12°55′E
- Country: Germany
- State: Bavaria
- Admin. region: Oberbayern
- District: Berchtesgadener Land

Government
  - Mayor (2020–26): Hannes Holzner (CSU)

Area
  - Total: 17.55 km^{2} (6.78 sq mi)
- Elevation: 455 m (1,493 ft)

Population (2025-12-31)
  - Total: 5,274
  - Density: 300.5/km^{2} (778.3/sq mi)
- Time zone: UTC+01:00 (CET)
  - Summer (DST): UTC+02:00 (CEST)
- Postal codes: 83448–83451
- Dialling codes: 08651
- Vehicle registration: BGL
- Website: www.piding.de

Piding is an approved climatic spa in Bavaria near to the border of Austria close to Bad Reichenhall and Freilassing.

== Geography ==
=== Geographical position ===
Piding is located in the middle of the Landkreis Berchtesgadener Land.

The municipal area corresponds to a natural expanse: It is bounded by the mountains Hochstaufen (1771 m) and Fuderheuberg (1.350 m) in the South, by the river Saalach in the East and by the hill Högl in the North-West. In the North-East, the Saalach shapes the borderline to Salzburg (Austria).

=== Districts and Neighbours ===
The districts are Piding, Kleinhögl, Bichlbruck, Urwies, Mauthausen, Staufenbrücke and Pidingerau.

Immediate neighbours are the town Bad Reichenhall and the municipalities Ainring and Anger.

== History ==
Archaeological troves show that the region was already populated in the New Stone Age (about 2800 BC). During the construction of the (former) ski-lift at the Fuderheuberg in 1970, copper bars from the Bronze Age were found.

=== Religions ===
The Catholic parish Maria Geburt (birth of Mary) is responsible for these churches:

- parish church Maria Geburt (Piding)
- St. Laurentius (Mauthausen)
- St. Johannes at Johannishögl (no regular masses)

=== Development of population ===
1790: 635 inhabitants; 1910: 864; 1946: 1,540; 1985: 3,996; 2000: 5,093; 2002: 5,257.

=== Coat of arms ===
The municipal coat of arms from 1962 refers to the former relations to the arch-monastery and chapter Salzburg (black lion's head) and to the Höglwörth Abbey (cross-over silver keys).

== Politics ==
=== Municipal council ===
Elections in 2014

- CSU: 9 seats
- Free voters: 6 seats
- Alliance 90/The Greens: 3 seats
- SPD: 2 seats

=== Mayor ===
First (governing) mayor is Hannes Holzner (CSU), second mayor Walter Pfannerstill (FWG) and third mayor Dr Bernhard Zimmer (Grüne).

== Culture and sights ==
=== Music/Tradition ===
- Club for the preservation of traditional costumes, "D'Staufenecker"
- Traditional band

=== Buildings ===
- Schloss Staufeneck

=== Sport ===
- tennis hall, tennis courts
- 50 km (31 mi) hiking trails, 12 km (7.5 mi) cross-country ski runs (tracked)
- Pidinger Klettersteig (fixed rope route) to the Hochstaufen
- Football ground

== Economy and infrastructure ==
=== Traffic ===
Next to Piding is the last exit of the motorway A 8 (Munich-Salzburg) in front of the border to Austria. The federal road B 20 (Berchtesgaden-Oberpfalz) is tangent to Piding. Piding has its own railway station on the Freilassing-Berchtesgaden railway line.

=== Education ===
- Primary and secondary school
- Rupertusschule (school for handicapped persons)

== Characters ==
=== Honorary citizens ===
- Max Wieser: former mayor

== Literature ==
- Max Wieser: Pidinger Heimatbuch, 1250 Jahre Piding - Verlag Plenk, Berchtesgaden 1985
