= Waging am See (Verwaltungsgemeinschaft) =

- Verwaltungsgemeinschaft
- Location of Waging am See within Traunstein district
- Interactive map of Waging am See
- Location within Germany Location within Bavaria
- Coordinates: 47°56′N 12°44′E
- Country: Germany
- State: Bavaria
- Admin. region: Upper Bavaria
- District: Traunstein
- Seat: Waging am See
- Subdivisions: 3 municipalities

Area
  - Total: 93.62 km^{2} (36.15 sq mi)

Population (2025-12-31)
  - Total: 10,681
  - Density: 114.1/km^{2} (295.5/sq mi)
- Time zone: UTC+01:00 (CET)
  - Summer (DST): UTC+02:00 (CEST)
- Website: www.vgwaging.de

Waging am See is a Verwaltungsgemeinschaft (municipal association) in the district of Traunstein in Bavaria, Germany. Its seat is in Waging am See.

It consists of the following municipalities:

1. Taching am See
2. Waging am See
3. Wonneberg
