= Meindl (company) =

Shoemaker

Lukas Meindl GmbH & Co.KG

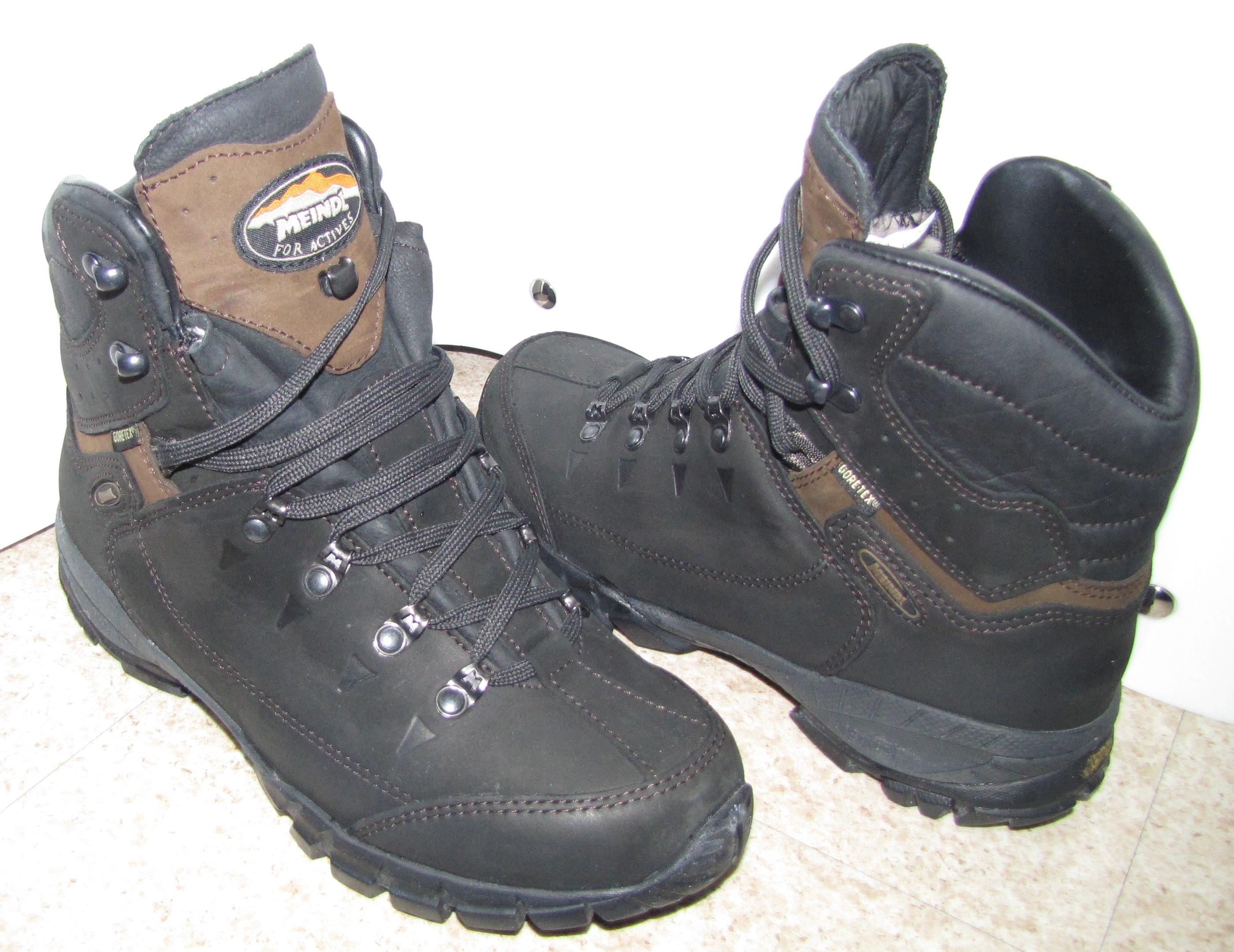
- Meindl Gastein mountain shoes
- Industry: Footwear
- Founded: 1683; 343 years ago
- Founder: Petrus Meindl
- Headquarters: Kirchanschöring, Bavaria, Germany
- Products: Hiking boots
- Website: meindl.de

Lukas Meindl GmbH & Co.KG, most commonly known as Meindl, is a German footwear manufacturer located in Kirchanschöring, Bavaria, known for its hiking boots for hiking and hillwalking. The company was founded in 1928.

In 1683 Petrus Meindl was officially listed as a shoemaker in written records. Every generation since Petrus has had a member of the Meindl family registered as a shoemaker. In 1928 Lukas Meindl founded the Meindl company.

In 1978 Hubert Hillmayer wore Meindl boots when he completed his ascent of Mount Everest.

The company also produces a line of clothing and have manufactured clothing for both BMW and Porsche.

Meindl currently produces the "Desert Fox" combat boots that are issued to soldiers of the British Military (including Royal Marines) in Iraq and Afghanistan, Felix Baumgartner also used Meindl boots in his 2013 jump from space.

In 2015, the Meindl Desert Defence was selected to equip French troops for deployment to theaters with a hot climate. It remains the desert combat boots of the French Army as of 2021, complementing the standard Haix Nepal Pro combat boots.
