= Taching am See =

Taching a.See
- Municipality
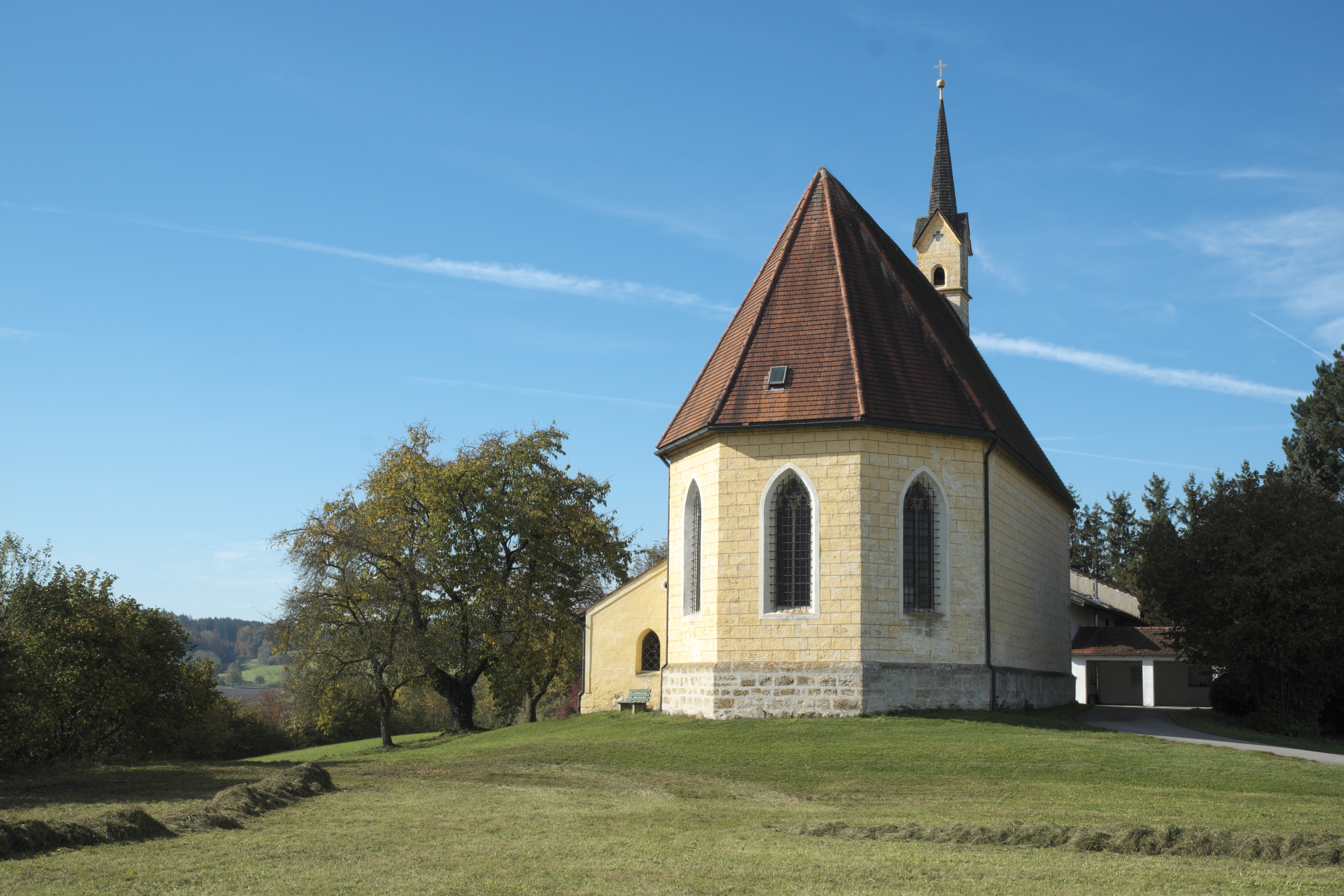
- Saint Koloman Church

- Coat of arms

- Location of Taching a.See within Traunstein district
- Interactive map of Taching a.See
- Location within Germany Location within Bavaria
- Coordinates: 47°58′N 12°43′E
- Country: Germany
- State: Bavaria
- Admin. region: Oberbayern
- District: Traunstein
- Municipal assoc.: Waging am See

Government
  - Mayor (2020–26): Stefanie Lang

Area
  - Total: 26.75 km^{2} (10.33 sq mi)
- Elevation: 478 m (1,568 ft)

Population (2025-12-31)
  - Total: 2,085
  - Density: 77.94/km^{2} (201.9/sq mi)
- Time zone: UTC+01:00 (CET)
  - Summer (DST): UTC+02:00 (CEST)
- Postal codes: 83373
- Dialling codes: 08681
- Vehicle registration: TS
- Website: www.taching.de

Taching am See (German pronunciation: [ˈtaxɪŋ ʔam ˈzeː], lit. 'Taching on the Lake') is a municipality in the district of Traunstein in Bavaria, Germany. The municipality lies to the west and northwest of the Tachinger See (Lake Taching).

Among the small villages in rural Taching am See are: Assing, Buchberg, Grendach, Gröben, Haunerting, Hörgassing, Hucking, Mauerham, Moosmühle, Obertaching, Planthal, Salling, Schönhofen and Tettenberg.

== History ==
In 1048, Henry VI of Bavaria gave these lands to the Roman Catholic Church. In the deed of donation is the first historical mention of the Tachinger See. Beginning in 1275, Taching am See belonged to the Prince-Archbishopric of Salzburg and the town was the site of district administration (Obmannschaft). When the Salzburg lands were secularized in 1803, Taching am See became the property of Ferdinand III of Tuscany. In 1805 in the Treaty of Pressburg it became part of Austria. In 1809 it was transferred to the Kingdom of Bavaria. Taching am See became an independent municipality in 1818, but in 1972 became part of the county (Verwaltungsgemeinschaft) of Waging am See. In the 20th century, the municipality developed into a recuperation and vacation locale.
