= Kirchanschöring =

- Municipality
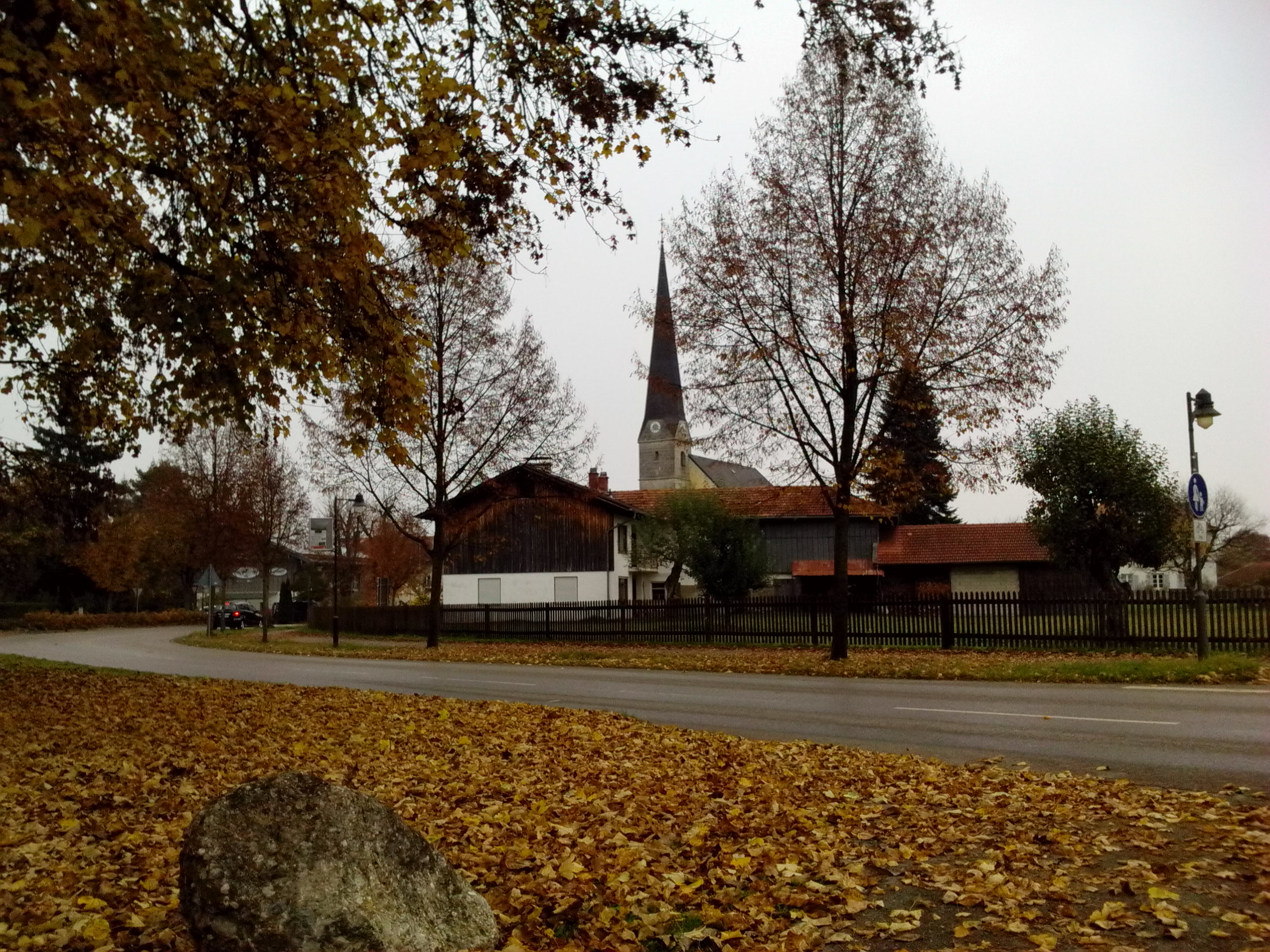
- Kirchanschöring in autumn

- Coat of arms

- Location of Kirchanschöring within Traunstein district
- Interactive map of Kirchanschöring
- Location within Germany Location within Bavaria
- Coordinates: 47°57′N 12°50′E
- Country: Germany
- State: Bavaria
- Admin. region: Oberbayern
- District: Traunstein

Government
  - Mayor (2020–26): Hans-Jörg Birner (CSU)

Area
  - Total: 25.23 km^{2} (9.74 sq mi)
- Elevation: 417 m (1,368 ft)

Population (2025-12-31)
  - Total: 3,332
  - Density: 132.1/km^{2} (342.0/sq mi)
- Time zone: UTC+01:00 (CET)
  - Summer (DST): UTC+02:00 (CEST)
- Postal codes: 83417
- Dialling codes: 08685
- Vehicle registration: TS
- Website: www.kirchanschoering.info

Kirchanschöring (German pronunciation: [ˈkɪʁçˌʔanʃøːʁɪŋ]) is a municipality in the district of Traunstein in Bavaria, Germany. The community is located in the Rupertiwinkel and borders on the eastern waterside of the Waginger See, although the town itself is situated some kilometers away from the lake.

== History ==
Kirchanschöring earlier belonged to the prince-bishopric of Salzburg. In 788, Kirchanschöring was first mentioned in a document as a possession of archbishop Arno, under the name Anschering. This name probably goes back to the name Ansheri or Anskar, relating to a person who settled there. Over the centuries, the name changed into Anschering and later, after the construction of the church in the 14th century, Kirchanschöring.

== Economy ==
The internationally known companies Meindl and Royalbeach have their headquarters in Kirchanschöring. Further main pillars are tourism, trade, and agriculture.

== Sights ==
- later gothic catholic church of Kirchstein
- Farming Museum in Hof
