= Götzinger Achen =

River in Germany

- The Götzinger Achen in Götzing, a part of Fridolfing

Location
- Country: Germany
- State: Bavaria

Physical characteristics
- Mouth
  - location: Salzach
  - coordinates: 48.0614°N 12.7769°E
- Length: 30.8 km (19.1 mi)
- Basin size: 235 km^{2} (91 sq mi)

Basin features
- Progression: Salzach→ Inn→ Danube→ Black Sea

The Götzinger Achen is a river of Bavaria, in southeastern Germany. It flows out of the Waginger See and discharges into the Salzach near Tittmoning.

== See also ==
- List of rivers of Bavaria
