= Rampelsberg =

Mountain in Germany

Coordinates: 48°02′N 12°42′E

Highest point
- Elevation: 520 m (1,710 ft)

Geography
- Location: Bavaria, Germany

Rampelsberg is a mountain of Bavaria, Germany. It is up to 555 m above sea level. NHN high elevation in the north of Rupertiwinkels in Upper Bavaria. It borders Palling, Taching, and Tittmoning. The Rampelsberg is heavily forested. Southeast of the Ramelsberg there is a gravel pit of Oppacher & Son fresh concrete GmbH & Co. KG.

== History ==
South of Rampelsberg there is the historic Schlossberg. This was when the Knights of Törring and the Archbishop of Salzburg allowed a castle to be built in 1210. After fierce disputes between Kaspar Knights of Törring and Heinrich the Rich of Bavaria, the castle was, however, completely destroyed in 1421. The walls of the castle were pulled down and the stones of the ruined castle contributed to the expansion of Burghausen Castle. The site of the castle, and the moat can still be seen today by contours in the landscape.

== Sports and leisure ==
On Rampelsberg, there are several marked cycling and hiking trails. The trails are designated as forest adventure paths with information boards and versatile ways to show the value and function of intact forest. The trails are paved in smaller portions and for the most part are graveled forest trails.

== See also ==
- List of the highest points of the German states
