= Johannishögl =

Mountain in the Alps

Coordinates: 47°47′32″N 12°55′24″E

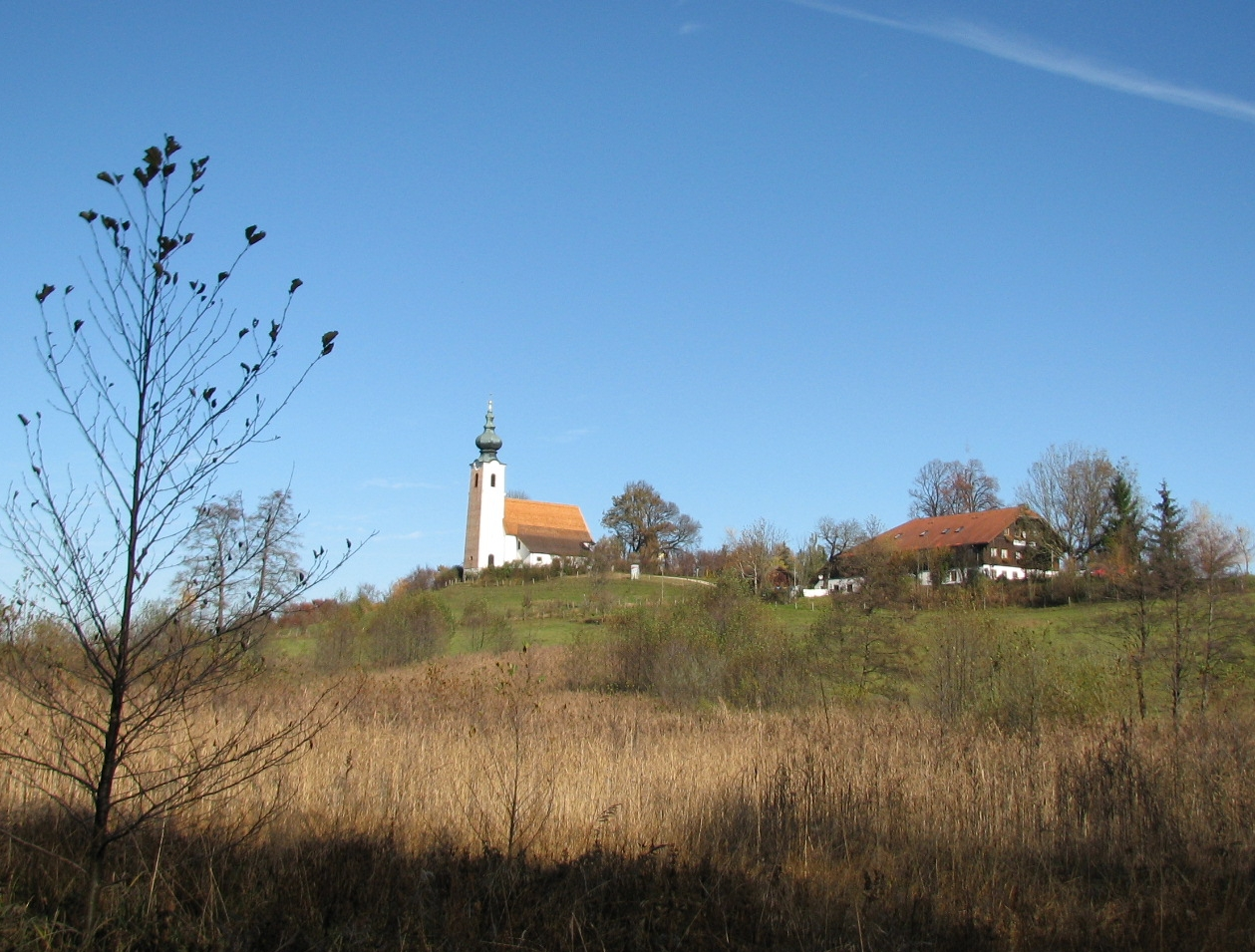
- Johannishoegl

Highest point
- Elevation: 705 m (2,313 ft)

Geography
- Location: Bavaria, Germany

Johannishögl is a mountain of Bavaria, Germany. It is a sub-peak of Högl.
