= Anger, Bavaria =

Anger
- Municipality
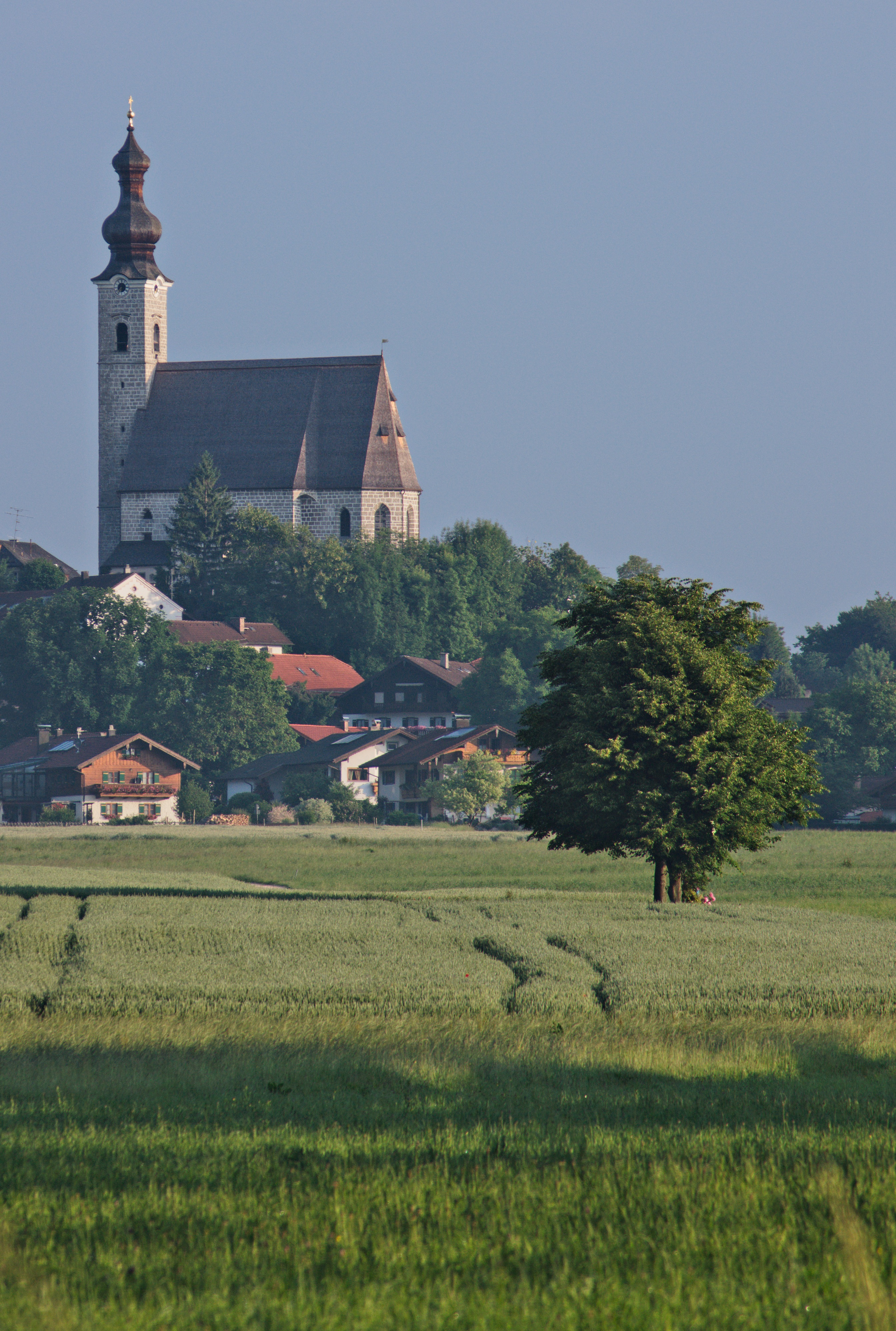
- Anger

- Flag Coat of arms

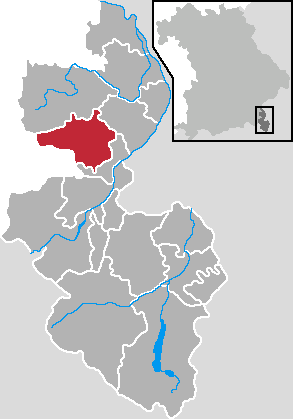
- Location of Anger within Berchtesgadener Land district
- Interactive map of Anger
- Location within Germany Location within Bavaria
- Coordinates: 47°47′N 12°50′E
- Country: Germany
- State: Bavaria
- Admin. region: Oberbayern
- District: Berchtesgadener Land

Government
  - Mayor (2020–26): Markus Winkler (CSU)

Area
  - Total: 45.91 km^{2} (17.73 sq mi)
- Elevation: 558 m (1,831 ft)

Population (2025-12-31)
  - Total: 4,213
  - Density: 91.77/km^{2} (237.7/sq mi)
- Time zone: UTC+01:00 (CET)
  - Summer (DST): UTC+02:00 (CEST)
- Postal codes: 83454
- Dialling codes: 08656
- Vehicle registration: BGL
- Website: www.anger.de

Anger (German pronunciation: [ˈaŋɐ]) is a municipality in the district of Berchtesgadener Land in Bavaria in Germany. The low peaks Högl and Johannishögl are within the municipality.

== Notable people ==
The German ski mountaineers Stefanie Koch and Stefan Klinger were born in Anger.
