= Högl =

Mountain in Germany

Coordinates: 47°48′30″N 12°54′00″E

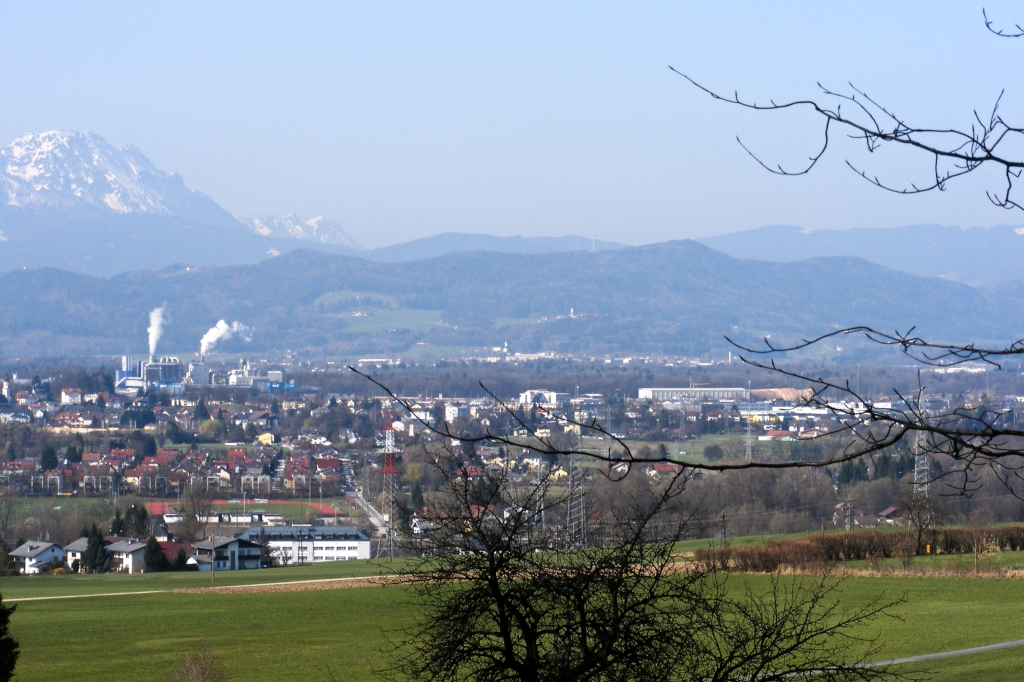
- Högl

Geography
- Location: Bavaria, Germany

Högl is a Bavarian mountain. Johannishögl is a smaller cone on the mountain.
