= Waging am See =

Waging a.See
- Municipality
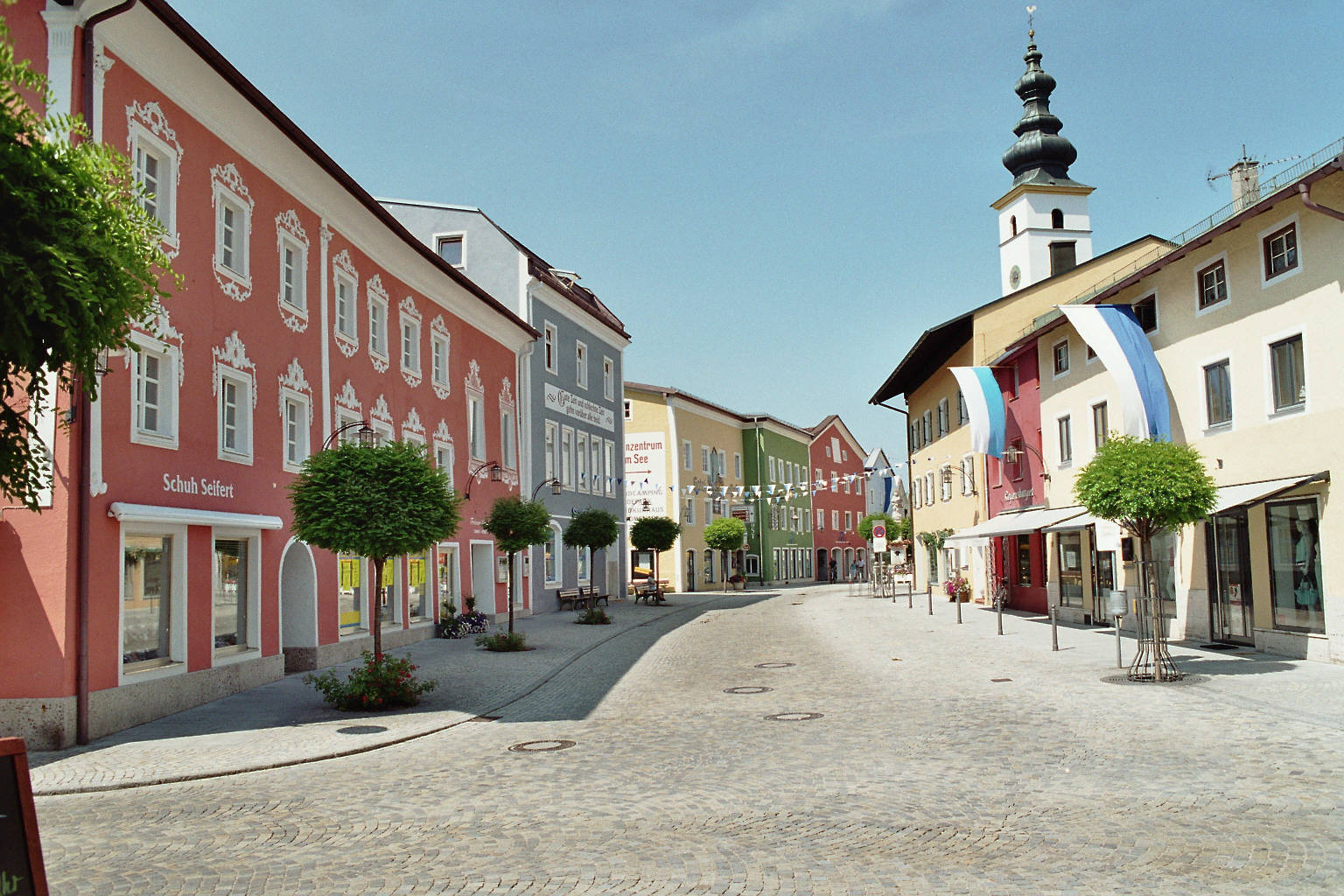
- Market square

- Coat of arms

- Location of Waging a.See within Traunstein district
- Interactive map of Waging a.See
- Location within Germany Location within Bavaria
- Coordinates: 47°56′N 12°44′E
- Country: Germany
- State: Bavaria
- Admin. region: Oberbayern
- District: Traunstein
- Municipal assoc.: Waging am See

Government
  - Mayor (2019–25): Matthias Baderhuber (CSU)

Area
  - Total: 48.87 km^{2} (18.87 sq mi)
- Elevation: 465 m (1,526 ft)

Population (2025-12-31)
  - Total: 7,036
  - Density: 144.0/km^{2} (372.9/sq mi)
- Time zone: UTC+01:00 (CET)
  - Summer (DST): UTC+02:00 (CEST)
- Postal codes: 83329
- Dialling codes: 08681
- Vehicle registration: TS
- Website: www.waging.de

Waging am See (German pronunciation: [ˈvaːɡɪŋ ʔam ˈzeː], lit. 'Waging on the Lake'; officially: Waging a. See) is a municipality in the district of Traunstein in Bavaria, Germany. The town, classified as a climatic spa, is located at the Waginger See, the warmest lake in Upper Bavaria, with temperatures up to 27 °C.

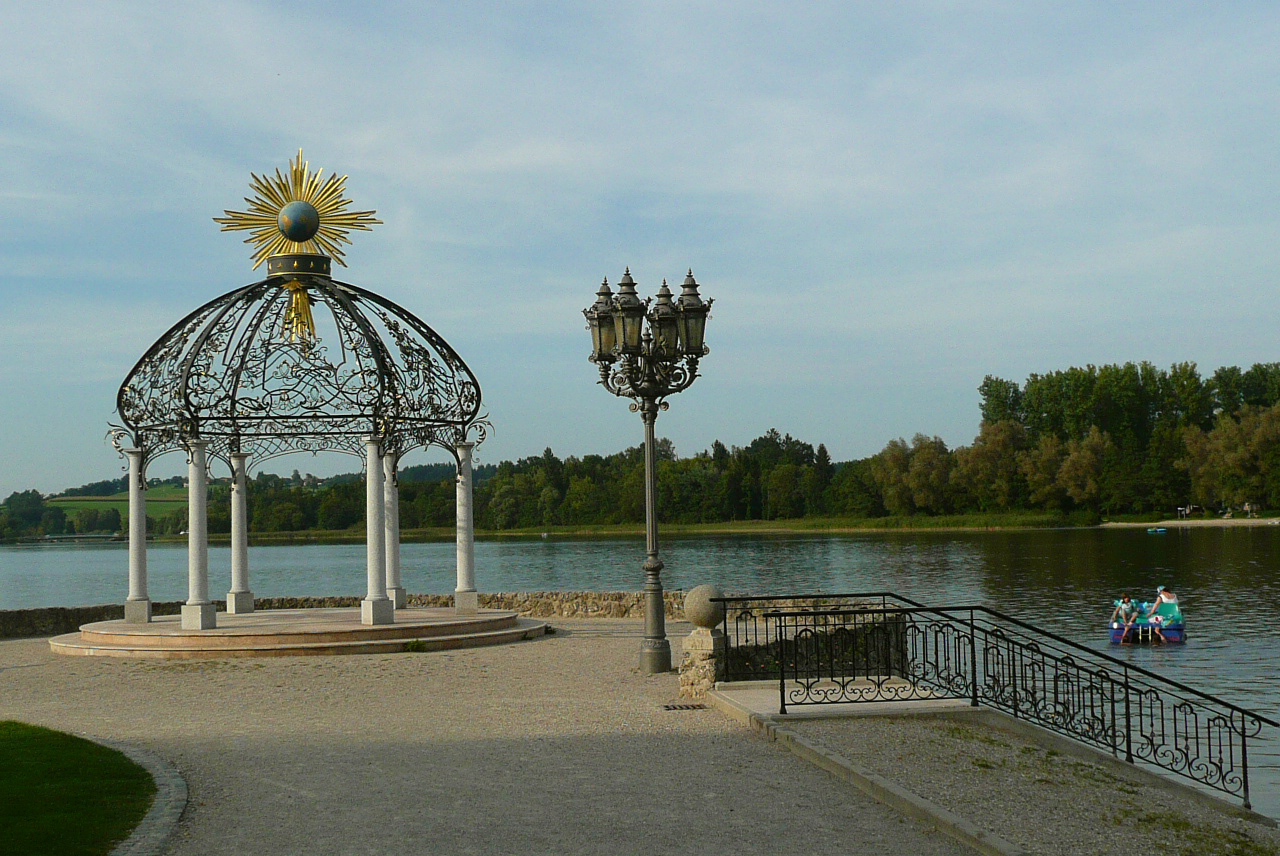
The lake promenade

== Geography ==
Waging is located west of the Waginger See. The name "am See" ("on the lake") is somewhat misleading: due to the lowering of the Tiroler Achen river, which originates from the southern end of the lake near the town of Petting, the water level declined about 6.5 feet (2.0 m) in 1867, which led to Waging being located away from the waterside.

== History ==
Waging am See was already mentioned in a deed in 740. Due to the so-called lower saline road, which led from Reichenhall to Wasserburg am Inn through Waging, the village was a prosperous place already in medieval ages. Back then Waging belonged to the Salzburg prince-bishopric. In the 14th century it was granted the right to hold markets. In 1685, Waging became the domicile of a Salzburgian court of law, became Austrian in 1805 for a short time, and belongs to Bavaria since 1810. Since then, Waging developed into a prominent leisure and vacation spot.

After 1945, many expellees settled in Waging. After the German local government reform in 1972, Waging became part of the Traunstein district. The localities Gaden, Otting, Freimann, and Tettenhausen were suburbanized.

== Politics ==
The election of Sepp Daxenberger as mayor in 1996 caused a stir, since he was the first mayor of the Green party in Bavaria. After the local elections in 2008, the mayor was Herbert Häusl of the Free Voters party; he was re-elected in 2014. The current mayor is Matthias Baderhuber (CSU), elected in 2019.

Since the local elections in 2020, the municipal council consists of the following parties:

- Free Voters - 7 seats
- CSU - 6 seats
- Alliance '90/The Greens/Citizens' list - 4 seats
- Ödp/Independents - 3 seats

== Places of interest ==
- Bajuwarenmuseum (museum about ancient Bavarians)

== Transportation ==
The town has three train stations, Waging, Otting and Unteraschau. All of which are served by the RB59 line with hourly service to Traunstein.

== Sports and leisure ==
The Waginger See, which is 3.9 miles (6.3 km) in length and 1.1 in breadth, boasts several camping areas such as the Strandcamp ("Beach Camp"), the Schwanenplatz ("Swan Spot") and Camping Gut Horn. In the surroundings are several opportunities for many kinds of leisure activities: hiking, alp and mountain tours, fishing, boating, golf, winter sports, mini golf, sailing and surfing, rowing, skating, traditional natural gymnastics, facilities for hydropathic treatment, tennis hall and court, beach volleyball, and soccer.

Waging is the initial point for the ancient Bavarian cycling trail, and is part of the pilgrimage route "Benediktweg" (leading to places of interest about Pope Benedict XVI), which was opened in August 2005.

== Personalities ==
=== Daughters and Sons ===
- Lothar Zagrosek (born 1942), Conductor
- Ludwig Felber, crew member of the LZ 129 "Hindenburg"
- Bernhard von Waging (born c. 1400, died 1472 in Eichstätt), writer and Benedictine,
- Alfons Schuhbeck(né Karg * 1949) TV cook, author of specialized books, chef in several establishments in Munich
