= Wonneberg =

- Municipality
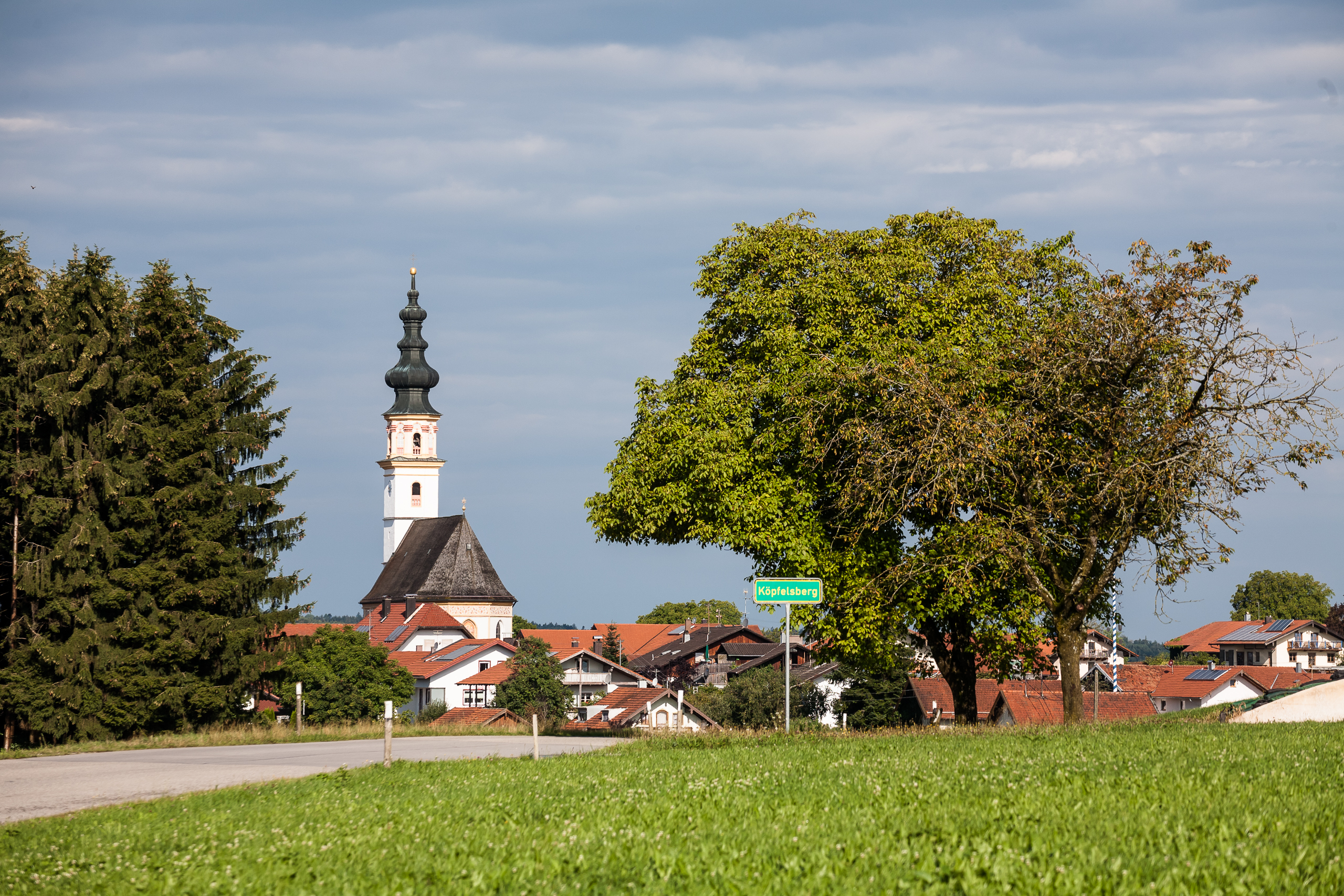
- St. Leonhard am Wonneberg

- Coat of arms

- Location of Wonneberg within Traunstein district
- Interactive map of Wonneberg
- Location within Germany Location within Bavaria
- Coordinates: 47°55′N 12°43′E
- Country: Germany
- State: Bavaria
- Admin. region: Oberbayern
- District: Traunstein
- Municipal assoc.: Waging am See

Government
  - Mayor (2020–26): Martin Fenninger

Area
  - Total: 18 km^{2} (6.9 sq mi)
- Elevation: 580 m (1,900 ft)

Population (2025-12-31)
  - Total: 1,560
  - Density: 87/km^{2} (220/sq mi)
- Time zone: UTC+01:00 (CET)
  - Summer (DST): UTC+02:00 (CEST)
- Postal codes: 83379
- Dialling codes: 08681
- Vehicle registration: TS
- Website: www.wonneberg.de

Wonneberg (German pronunciation: [ˈvɔnəbɛʁk]) is a municipality in the district of Traunstein in Bavaria, Germany.
