= Fuderheuberg =

Mountain in Bavaria, Germany

Coordinates: 47°45′12″N 12°52′16″E

Highest point
- Elevation: 1,350 m (4,430 ft)

Geography
- Location: Bavaria, Germany

Fuderheuberg is a mountain of Bavaria, Germany located near to the major Austrian city of Salzburg and the German city of Bad Reichenhall.
