= Waginger See =

Lake in Bavaria, Germany

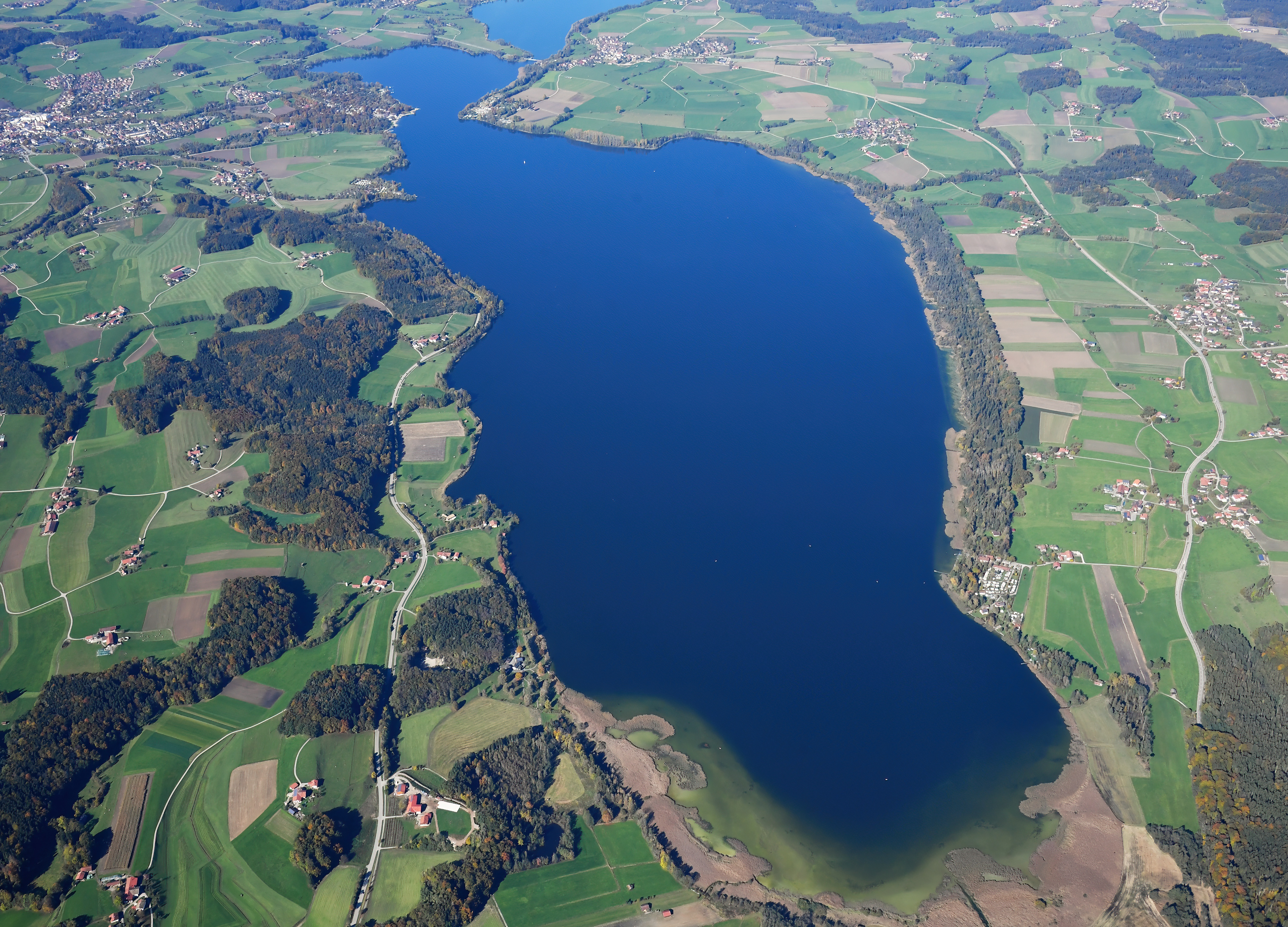

- Location within Bavaria
- Location: Alpine foothills, Bavaria
- Coordinates: 47°56′19″N 12°46′39″E
- Primary inflows: Tenglinger Bach, Höllenbach, Schinderbach
- Primary outflows: Götzinger Achen
- Catchment area: 163.66 km^{2} (63.19 sq mi)
- Basin countries: Germany
- Surface area: 8.97 km^{2} (3.46 sq mi)
- Max. depth: 27 m (89 ft)
- Surface elevation: 441 m (1,447 ft)

Waginger See (German pronunciation: [ˈvaːɡɪŋɐ ˈzeː]) is a lake in the Alpine foothills, Bavaria, Germany. Geologically, it forms one single lake with the Tachinger See, with which it is connected through a narrow strait at Tettenhausen. The surface area of the Waginger See proper is 6.61 km^{2} (2.55 sq mi); combined with the Tachinger See it is 8.97 km^{2} (3.46 sq mi). Its elevation is 441 m (1,447 ft) and its drainage area is 163.66 km^{2} (63.19 sq mi). Its primary inflows are Schinderbach, Höllenbach and Tenglinger Bach, and it is drained by the Götzinger Achen.
