= Virgin and Child with an Angel =

Virgin and Child with an Angel can refer to:

- Virgin and Child with an Angel (Botticelli, Florence)
- Virgin and Child with an Angel (Botticelli, Boston)
- Madonna and Child with an Angel (Moretto)
- Nursing Madonna with an Angel by Correggio
