= Bernheimer =

Bernheimer is a German surname. Notable people with the surname include:

- Alan Bernheimer (born 1948), American poet
- Alan W. Bernheimer (1913–2006), American professor of microbiology
- Charles S. Bernheimer (1868–1960), American social worker
- Kate Bernheimer, American writer
- Konrad Bernheimer (born 1950), German art dealer and collector
- Lehmann Bernheimer (1841–1918), German antique dealer
- Martin Bernheimer (1936–2019), American music critic
- Otto Bernheimer (1877–1960), German art collector and antique dealer
- Teresa Bernheimer (born 1978), German historian of Islam

== See also ==
- Bernheimer, Missouri, an unincorporated community in Warren County, Missouri, United States
