= P. & D. Colnaghi & Co. =

Art dealers in central London, the oldest commercial art gallery in the world

Coordinates: 51.5072°N 0.1390°W

Colnaghi is an art dealership in St James's, central London, England, which is the oldest commercial art gallery in the world, having been established in 1760.

== Foundation ==
The business that became the Colnaghi gallery was established by Italian firework manufacturer, Giovanni Battista Torre, in Paris, France, in 1760. Torre opened a shop with the name "Cabinet de Physique Expérimentale", where he sold scientific instruments, books and prints.

In 1767, Torre's son Anthony Torre moved to London where he opened a sister shop, specialising in prints, in partnership with another Italian immigrant, Anthony Molteno. Giovanni Torre died in 1780, and in 1784 Anthony Torre hired Paul Colnaghi—newly arrived in Paris from Milan—to manage a new shop in Palais-Royal, Paris.

== Paul Colnaghi (1751-1833) ==
Paul Colnaghi was born in 1751 as Paolo Colnago, in the Brianza region of northern Italy. He was the younger child of the influential Milanese lawyer Dr Martino Colnago and Ippolita Colnaga (née Raggi). He arrived in Paris after his father's death in 1783, where he initially worked for a Milanese optician named Ciceri, before Ciceri recommended Colnaghi's services to his friend Anthony Torre. Paul Colnaghi served as Torre's Paris agent (1784-7), mainly selling prints from England, but he left Paris for London in May 1785.

Arriving in London, Colnaghi joined Torre and Molteno, who had become successful selling prints by leading engravers such as William Wynne Ryland and Valentine Green. The London business moved to 132 Pall Mall in 1786 and Colnaghi married Anthony Torre's sister-in-law Elizabeth Baker. Anthony Torre retired to Italy in 1788, and Molteno took over as senior partner. The firm operated as Molteno, Colnaghi & Co.

Colnaghi now ran the original firm with a succession of partners, concentrating on selling new prints and engravings of Old Master paintings. He published a very popular series of engravings, the Cries of London, from 1792 to 1797. He also moved premises to 23 Cockspur Street in 1799, and survived the disruption to his trade caused by the Napoleonic Wars.

Paul Colnaghi's elder son Dominic Charles (sometimes also given as Dominic Paul) became a partner in around 1810, and later his younger son Martin also became a partner. The firm held monthly levées at its premises for its customers, many from the British aristocracy. Colnaghi became the official print-seller to the Prince Regent, and he was asked to organise the Royal Collection, receiving a Royal Warrant when the Prince Regent became George IV. Colnaghi was also print-seller to George's sister, Charlotte, Princess Royal, later Queen of Württemberg.

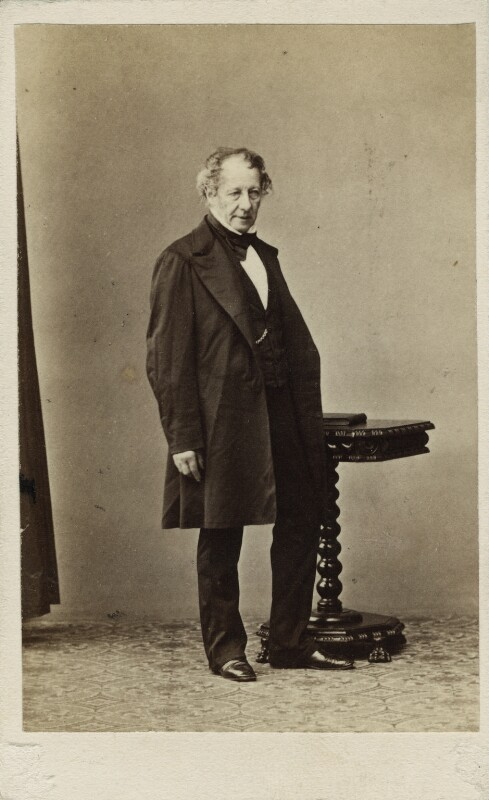

Colnaghi's impending retirement to Italy was postponed when his son Martin sued both his father and his brother Dominic in 1824. The settlement of the lawsuit left Martin with the old shop. Martin became bankrupt in 1832 and 1843, and died in 1851, but his son Martin Henry Colnaghi, continued the separate business in Pall Mall.

Paul and Dominic Colnaghi moved to 14 Pall Mall East—near the nascent National Gallery. Dominic married Katherine Pontet (d.1881) on 15 October 1831, and settled at 62 Margaret Street, Cavendish Square. Paul Colnaghi continued to work in the business until he died at his home at St George's Place, Hanover Square, on 26 August 1833.

== Dominic Colnaghi (1790–1879) and John Scott (d.1864) ==
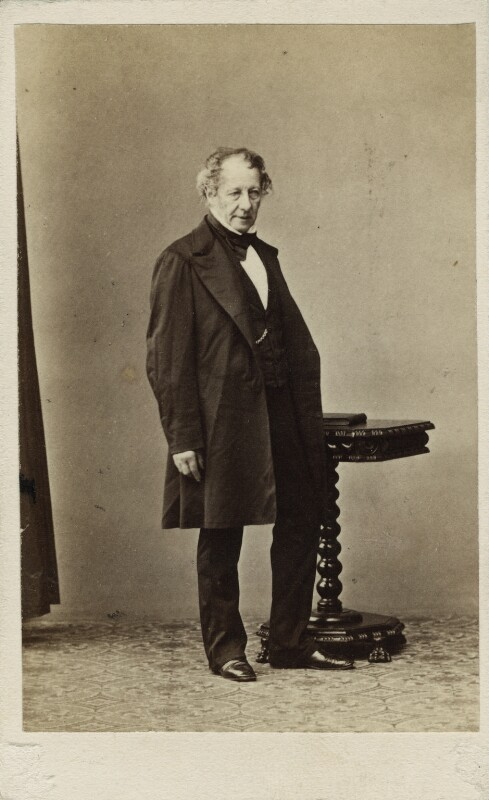
Dominic Charles Colnaghi (1790–1879)

Caroline Scott's son, John Anthony Scott, joined his cousin Dominic Colnaghi in the business in 1839. Scott commissioned William Simpson to go to the Crimea in 1854 to make watercolour sketches of scenes from the Crimean War, published as a series of 81 lithographs in The Seat of War in the East. The gallery also sold photographs by Roger Fenton. After this early experience with photography, the gallery commissioned Leonida Caldesi and Mattia Montecchi to take photographs at the Art Treasures Exhibition in 1857, published in Gems of the Manchester Art Treasures Exhibition in 1858, and Colnaghi published artistic photographs by Julia Margaret Cameron from 1864.

The firm was associated with John Constable, assisting him to exhibit The Hay Wain at the Paris Salon of 1824, where it won a gold medal. The art dealership organised exhibitions for the British Institution, and of paintings by Eugène Delacroix in 1829.

After Scott died in 1864, and Dominic Colnaghi retired in 1865, Scott's cousin Andrew McKay (d. 1899) became sole proprietor. He was joined by his son William KcKay in 1879. "Old Dom" Colnaghi died the same year, on 19 December, and was buried in Brompton Cemetery. He was survived by his wife Katherine (also spelled Catherine) and by his two sons.

== Old Master art dealer ==
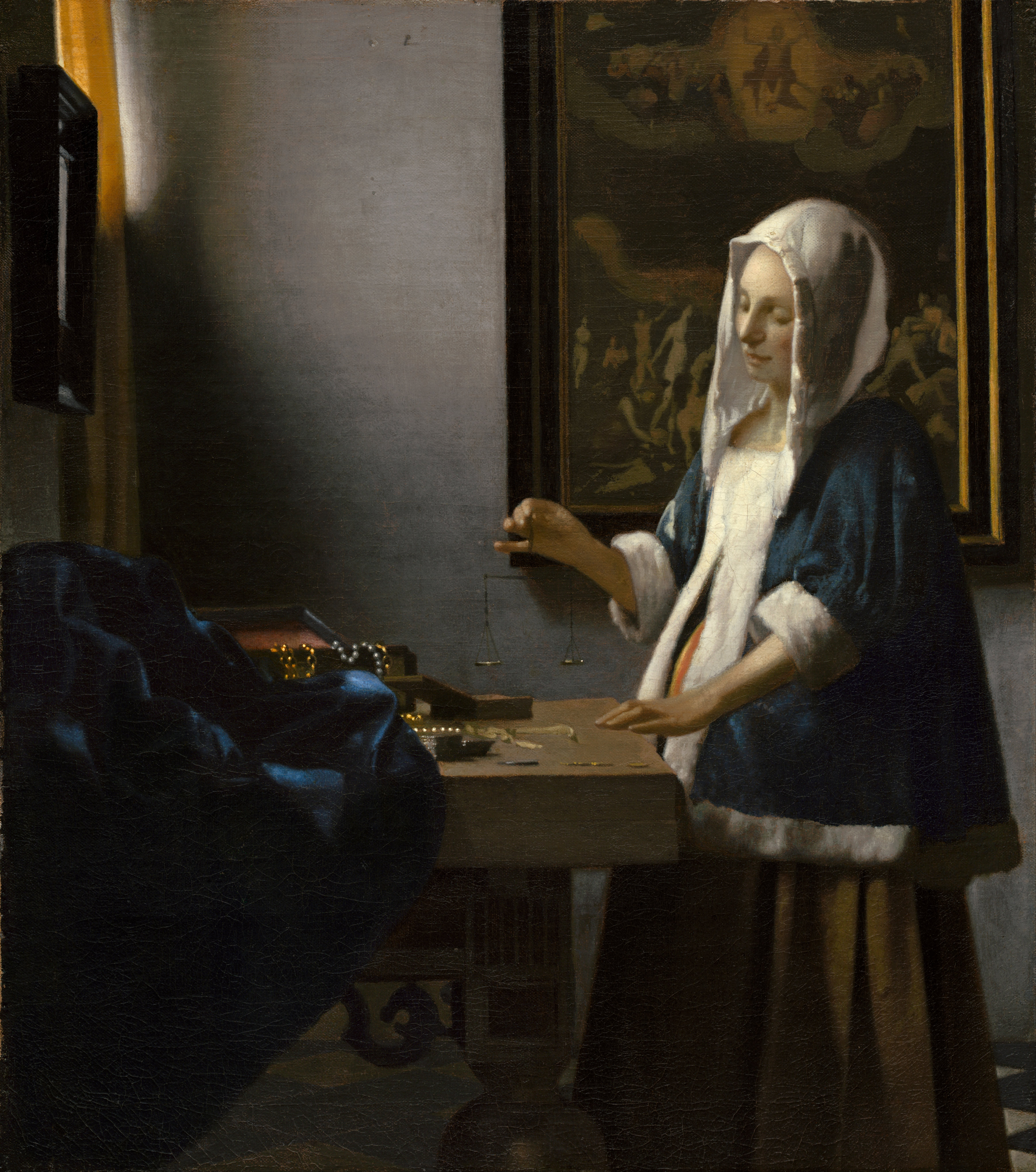
In 1910, Colnaghi and Knoedler acquired Woman Holding a Balance by Johannes Vermeer. On 11 January 1911 the painting was sold to P.A.B. Widener whose son, Joseph donated it to the National Gallery of Art in 1942.

When Andrew McKay retired in 1894, William McKay was joined in partnership by Edmund Deprez and Otto Gutekunst (1865–1947). Gutekunst was the son of Heinrich Gottlob Gutekunst, who managed the London branch of Paris art dealer Goupil & Cie in the 1860s. From the early 1860s he was working in the firm's London branch. The change of partners led to a significant change in the focus of the dealership. Colnaghi had been known primarily as a print-seller in the 19th century, but the firm started to gain a reputation as a dealer of Old Master paintings. The sale of original Old Master works accelerated for a number of reasons: the Settled Land Act 1882 allowed the breaking of entailed estates, allowing sales of aristocratic collections; the need to pay death duties, introduced in 1894, spurred the sale of works from the collections of the British aristocracy; and American collectors developed a taste for Old Master works.

With American art dealer Bernard Berenson, Colnaghi established a collection of Old Master paintings for Isabella Stewart Gardner for her house in Boston, including the Rape of Europa by Titian, acquired from Edward Bligh, 7th Earl of Darnley in 1896. The firm sold two paintings from the collection of Prince Mario Chigi Albani della Rovere—Botticelli's Madonna of the Eucharist and Titian's Portrait of Pietro Aretino—to Henry Clay Frick, now in the Frick Collection, although the sale of Italian paintings dried up after Prince Chigi was prosecuted under a new Italian law prohibiting the export of pictures. The new law also prevented the sale of Titian's Sacred and Profane Love from the Borghese collection. Berenson was offered a partnership by Colnaghi in 1901, but decided not to accept the offer and later signed a partnership agreement with Colnaghi's arch-rival, Joseph Duveen.

Colnaghi hired instead Charles Carstairs of New York gallery Knoedler instead. Colnaghi developed a fruitful relationship with Knoedler, with Colnaghi finding suitable paintings in Europe for Knoedler to sell to wealthy collectors in the United States, including Andrew Mellon. Through Knoedler, Colnaghi sold to Mellon a Rembrandt Self-portrait that Gutekunst had acquired from the Duke of Buccleuch, and Holbein's Portrait of Edward VI.

Colnaghi negotiated the sale of Lord Ashburnham's Botticelli, The Story of Lucretia to Isabella Stewart Gardner, and also the sale of Rembrandt's Preacher Anslo and his wife.

Colnaghi worked with Max Jakob Friedländer and Wilhelm von Bode on the acquisition of a selection of paintings from the Hope Collection for the Berlin State Museums.

Colnaghi sold Holbein's Christina of Denmark, Duchess of Milan to the National Gallery for a record price of £61,000, acquired from the collection of the Duke of Norfolk.

Deprez retired in 1907, and William McKay in 1911. The firm merged with Obach & Co in 1911—Gutekunst having married Charles Obach's daughter Lena in 1882—and Gustavus Mayer, formerly manager of Obach in New Bond Street, joined Colnaghi as a partner, with the firm renamed P. & D. Colnaghi and Obach. The firm moved to a new building in New Bond Street in 1912, but returned to the name P. and D. Colnaghi and Company in 1914 (perhaps due to popular sentiment against German-sounding names at the beginning of the First World War).

== Hermitage sales ==
Colnaghi was involved in the secret sales by the Soviet government of works from the Russian Imperial collection in the Hermitage in the 1920s and 1930s, along with Knoedler and Matthiesen in Berlin.

Calouste Gulbenkian had bought four sets of works from the Soviet government in 1928 to 1930, most now held by the Calouste Gulbenkian Museum in Lisbon. Colnaghi, Knoedler and Matthiesen assisted Paul Mellon to acquire many Russian works, including van Dyck's Portrait of Philip, 4th Lord Wharton, Jan van Eyck's Annunciation, Botticelli's Adoration of the Magi, Perugino's Crucifixion, Raphael's Saint George and the Dragon and Alba Madonna, Titian's Venus with a Mirror, and other works by Rembrandt and van Dyck. Mellon later donated his collection to the National Gallery of Art in Washington, DC.

== Recent history ==
In 1937, the firm became a limited company, with three directors: Otto Gutekunst, Gustavus Mayer, and James Byam Shaw. Gutekunst retired in 1939 and died in 1947; Mayer died in 1954. Meanwhile, Harold Wright and Tom Baskett became directors in 1939, and Roderic Thesiger in 1955.

Colnaghi moved from New Bond Street to Old Bond Street in 1940, to share space with Knoedler. The Old Master Drawings department became pre-eminent under the leadership of James Byam Shaw, and Byam Shaw largely determined the direction of the firm after Mayer's death in 1954 until his own retirement in 1968. The gallery was involved in the sale of an outstanding collection of prints by the Prince of Liechtenstein.

As Thesiger also wished to retire, and John Baskett wanted to start his own business, Jacob Rothschild bought the company in 1970. He sold Colnaghi to the Oetker Group in 1981, owned by a Colnaghi client Rudolf Oetker. Under Richard Knight, Colnaghi expanded in the buoyant art market of the 1980s, opening a gallery in New York in 1983. Changing market conditions led to the closure of the print and watercolour departments in 1989, followed by the closure of the Paris gallery and then Colnaghi New York in 1996. In 2001, the Oetker Group sold Colnaghi to Konrad Bernheimer, owner of Bernheimer Fine Old Masters in Munich. Colnaghi was merged with the gallery of Katrin Bellinger who took charge of Colnaghi's drawings department.

Since 2015, the CEO has been Jorge Coll. He acquired Colnaghi from Konrad Bernheimer, who had retired as chairman.

Colnaghi then moved into a custom-built gallery in St James's in London where they show European Old Master paintings and sculpture, and art from the Spanish-speaking world.

In 2017, Colnaghi opened a gallery in New York led by Carlos A. Picón, formerly curator of Greek and Roman Art at the Metropolitan Museum of Art, expanding their offering to include art of the ancient world.

Victoria Golembiovskaya, the founder of an art consultancy called House of the Nobleman, joined the firm in 2019 as Coll's co-CEO to establish Colnaghi’s first modern and contemporary department and left at the end of 2021 to set up her own independent agency. Jorge Coll remains the main dealer and shareholder of Colnaghi.

== Archives ==
Colnaghi includes a 225-foot archive of important art dealers records, currently stored outside London at the Windmill Hill Archives, Waddesdon Manor. In 2002, Katrin Bellinger Henkel and Konrad Bernheimer bought them from Christoph Graf Douglas, the former head of Sotheby's in Germany and the son-in-law of Rudolf August Oetker, whose company owned Colnaghi and its archives between 1981 and 2001. Since then, the ownership of the Colnaghi Library and Archives has been held by Colnaghi Holding Ltd.

The Department of Image Collections at the National Gallery of Art Library holds photographs documenting sales at London’s Colnaghi gallery from 1950 to 1980.
