= Bernheimer Fine Old Masters =

Coordinates: 48.1427°N 11.5764°E

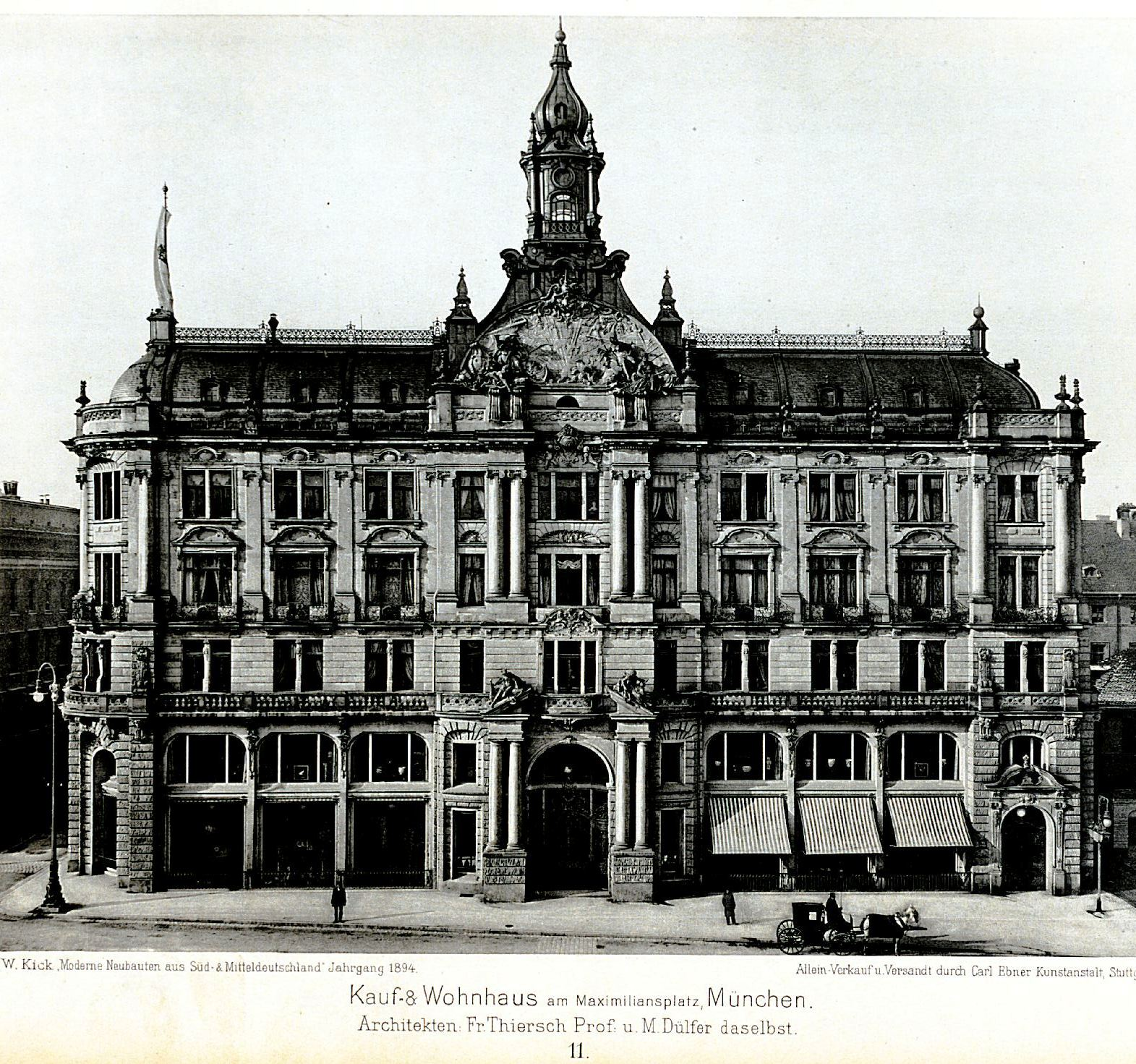
Bernheimer-Haus (before 1895)

Bernheimer Fine Old Masters was a German art gallery and dealership in Munich, owned by Konrad Bernheimer.

== History ==
In 1887, Lehmann Bernheimer bought a small coffee house and beer garden (owned and run by an Englishman) called the English Café. In its place was built the Bernheimer-Haus, which was officially opened in December 1889 by Luitpold, Prince Regent of Bavaria. Initially, the focus was on high-quality textiles, with the manufacture of luxury goods being slowly added. After a fire in 1897, the building was extended and antiques, tapestries and carpets were added.

In 1918, his son Otto Bernheimer took over the business. In the late 1930s, he and his family were sent by the Nazis to Dachau concentration camp, but they were eventually allowed to emigrate to Venezuela. After the war, Otto Bernheimer returned, and in 1948, he moved into the art trade.

Otto's grandson Konrad Bernheimer took over in 1977 and renamed the business as Bernheimer Fine Old Masters, since the company was specializing in Old Master paintings from the 16th to 19th centuries. In 1987, the Bernheimer-Haus was sold by Konrad Bernheimer to pay his co-heirs.

In 2002, he bought Colnaghi of London, the oldest existing art dealer in the world. In 2016, he shut down his business in Munich and concentrated on Colnaghi in London.
