= Junín Municipality =

Junín Municipality may refer to:

- Junín, Cundinamarca, Colombia
- Junín Municipality, Táchira, Venezuela
