= Bornheimer (surname) =

Bornheimer is a surname. Notable people with the surname include:

- Jake Bornheimer (1927–1986), American basketball player
- James Bornheimer (1933–1993), American politician
- Kyle Bornheimer (born 1975), American actor and comedian

== See also ==
- Bernheimer
