= Burg Marquartstein =

Historic 11th-century castle in Bavaria

Coordinates: 47.7567°N 12.4689°E

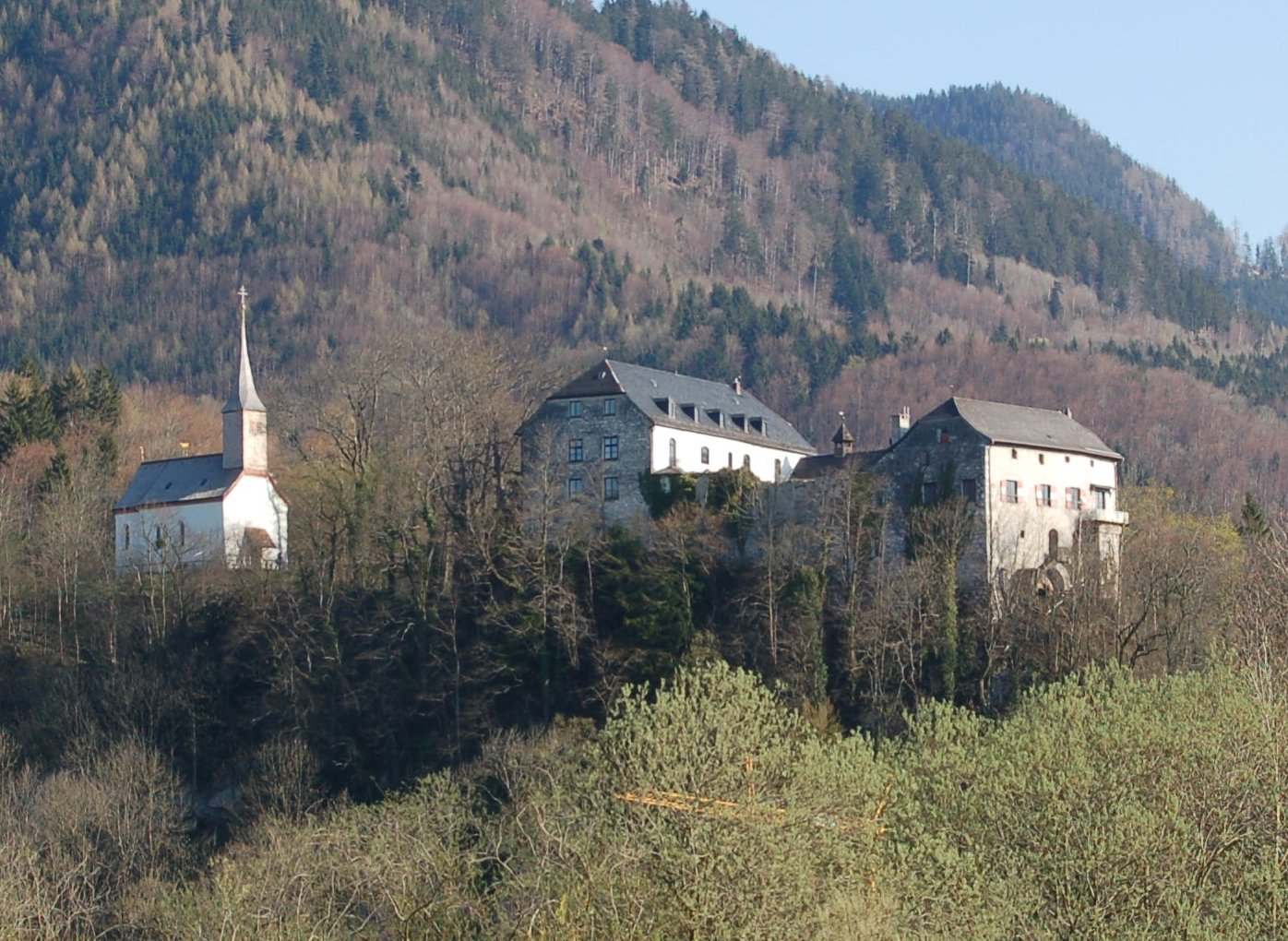
Burg Marquartstein, 2009

Burg Marquartstein is an 11th-century castle in Marquartstein, Bavaria, Germany.

The 40-bedroom castle was bought by the German art dealer and collector Konrad Bernheimer in 1987, to house his family's collection of art and antiques, as he had just sold the Bernheimer-Haus in Munich.

It is listed for sale with Sotheby's International Realty as of November 2015, with "price upon request".
