= Konrad Bernheimer =

German art dealer and collector

- Born: Konrad Otto Bernheimer; 30 August 1950 (age 75); Rubio, Venezuela
- Occupations: Art dealer and collector
- Title: Chairman and owner, Bernheimer Fine Old Masters, Munich; Former owner, Colnaghi, London
- Spouse: Barbara Schaeffer
- Relatives: Otto Bernheimer (grandfather); Lehmann Bernheimer (great grandfather)

Konrad Otto Bernheimer (born 30 August 1950) is a German Venezuelan art dealer and collector. He is the chairman and owner of Bernheimer Fine Old Masters in Munich, and was the owner of Colnaghi in London. He sold Colnaghi to the Spanish dealers Jorge Coll and Nicolas Cortés in 2016.

== Early life ==
Konrad Otto Bernheimer was born in Rubio, Venezuela, on 30 August 1950. Following Kristallnacht on 9–10 November 1938, which saw the huge plate glass windows of the Bernheimer-Haus smashed, the family was sent to Dachau concentration camp. The Mexican government intervened, as his grandfather Otto Bernheimer was the Mexican honorary consul in Munich. Hermann Göring, a Bernheimer client, did a deal whereby they bought his niece’s Venezuelan coffee plantation which was struggling, and were allowed to emigrate there, and also had to take Göring's aunt and her Jewish husband along, and support them until they died.

His father Kurt Bernheimer (1911–1954) committed suicide (which Konrad only found out about when writing his memoirs) in Venezuela, and his Venezuelan mother, Mercedes Uzcátegui Ramírez, and his two sisters joined Otto in Germany, who had returned to Munich in 1945.

== Career ==
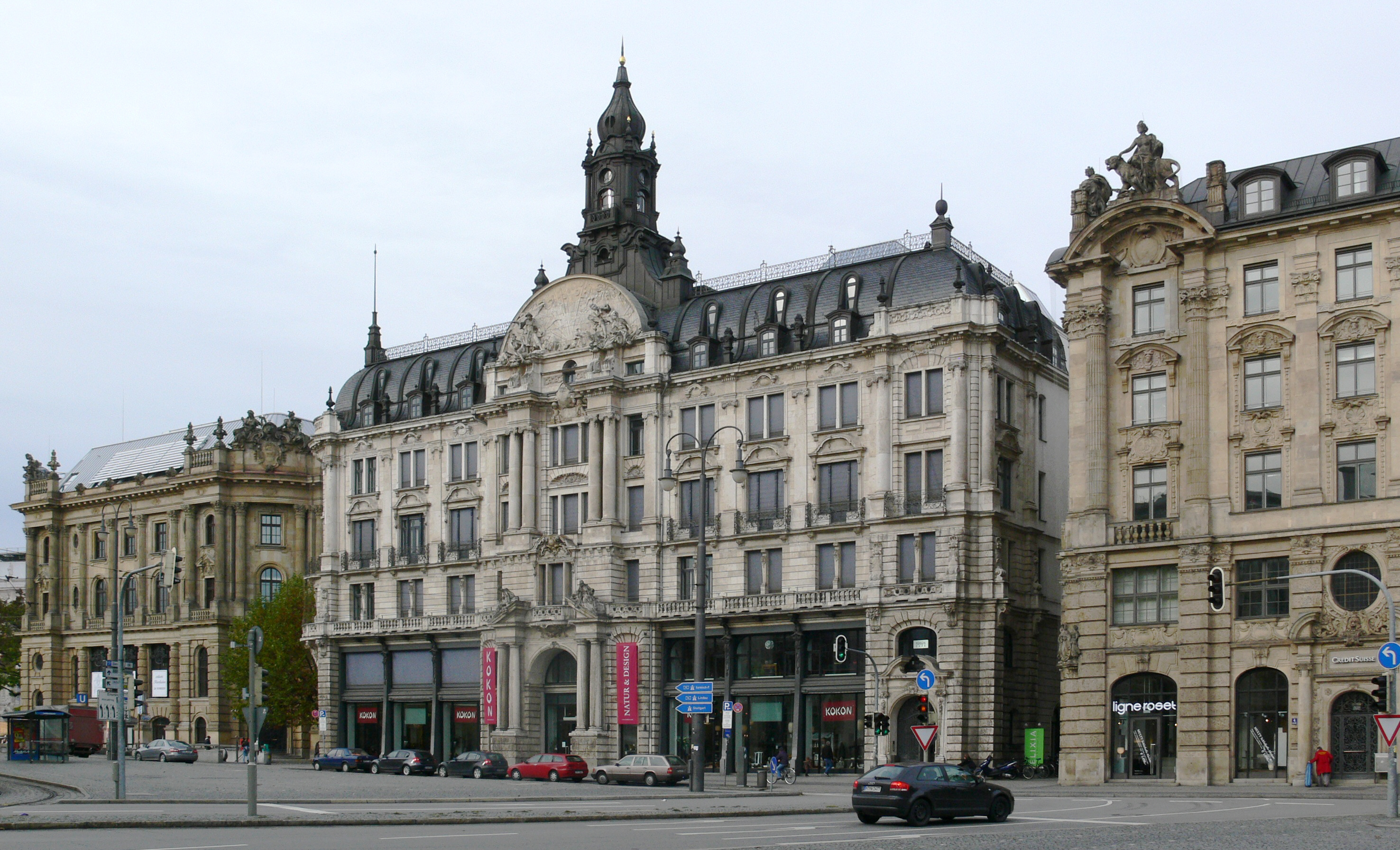
Bernheimer-Haus

Konrad O. Bernheimer is the fourth generation of a family dealing in art and antiques, founded by his great-grandfather Lehmann Bernheimer as Bernheimer in May 1864.

Bernheimer took over the family business in 1977, aged 26, and has moved it from a more broadly based art and antiques business to one dealing in Old Masters.

In 1987, he sold the Bernheimer-Haus in Munich, a "massive baroque-style, purpose-built palace ten bays wide and six storeys high".

As well as being the chairman and owner of Bernheimer Fine Old Masters, Munich, he owned Colnaghi in London, founded in 1760, and the world's oldest gallery, which he bought in 2002. He sold the company to the Spanish dealers Jorge Coll and Nicolas Cortés in 2016.

He was a board member of The European Fine Art Foundation, and chairman of its fine art division, Pictura, from 2004 until 2019.

== Publications ==
- Great Masters and Unicorns (2015)

== Personal life ==
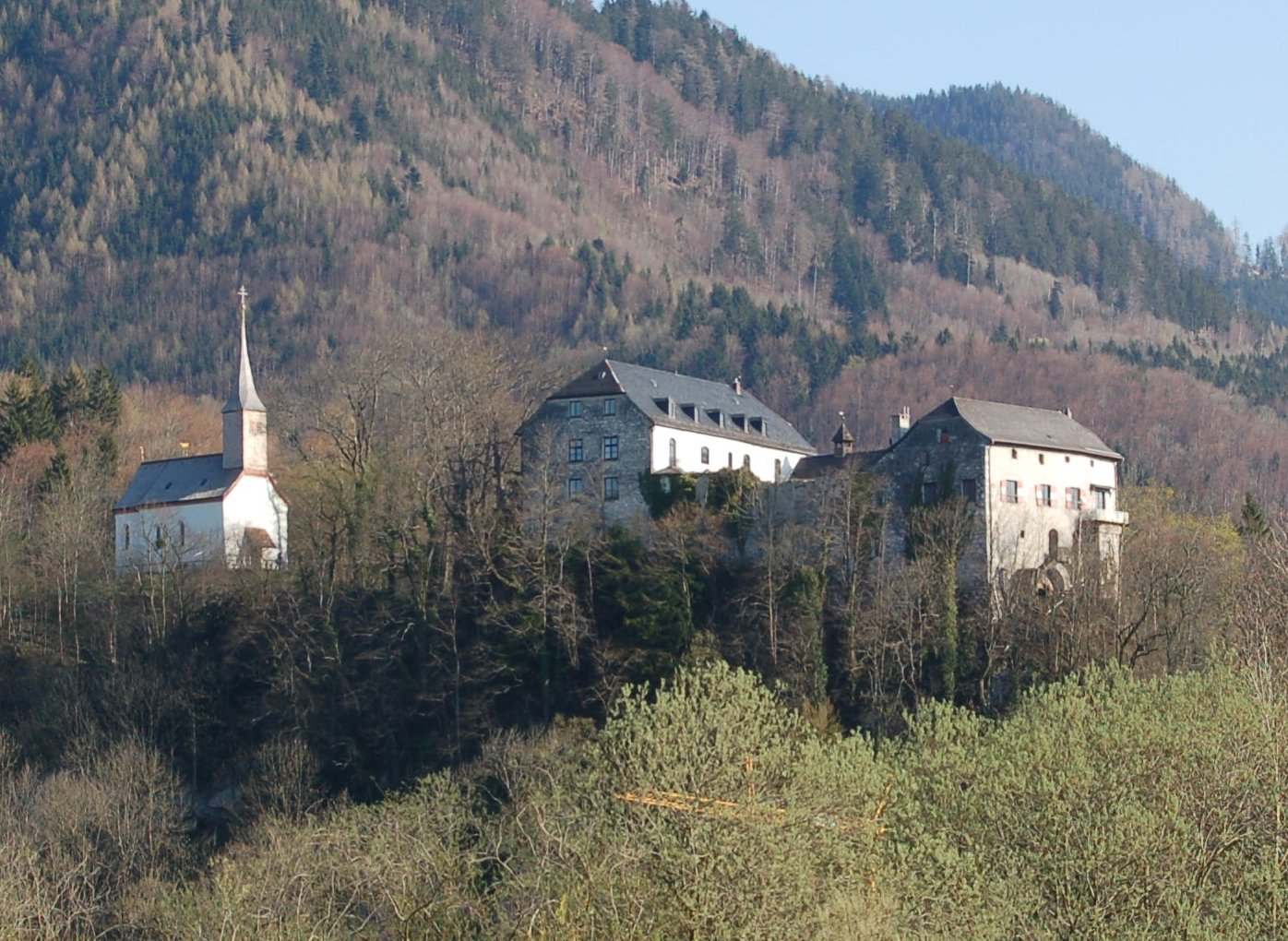
Burg Marquartstein, 2009

He owns the 11th century 40-bedroom castle, Burg Marquartstein in Marquartstein, Bavaria, which is listed for sale with Sotheby's International Realty as of November 2015, with "price upon request".

The Bernheimer sale of works of art from Burg Marquarstein at Sotheby's in London in November 2015 realised £2,371,000.

His daughter Blanca Bernheimer has dealt in fine art photography since 2005.

== Honours ==
Bernheimer has been awarded the Order of Merit of the Federal Republic of Germany. and he is Chevalier des Arts et des Lettres de la Republique Française.
