= Highlights – Internationale Kunstmesse München =

Highlights – Internationale Kunstmesse München is an exhibition of art and antiques in a wide range from ancient to modern. The art fair dates back to the "Deutsche Kunst und Antiquitätenmesse" (German art and antiques fair) initiated by Otto Bernheimer in 1956. The event, located in the Munich Haus der Kunst, is held annually in the fall and runs for 10 days. The current initiators of the exhibition are 19 art dealers who have established themselves at The European Fine Art Fair (TEFAF) in Maastricht, Netherlands, over the last two decades.

== History ==
The art collector and antique dealer Otto Bernheimer initiated the art and antique fair in 1956, at the beginning of the German economic boom and was elected president of the German art trade association. Until 1988 the art fair, which was regarded as the leading event of its kind in Germany, was held at the Haus der Kunst in Munich and later was moved to Messe München in Riem. Due to lack of attendance from both the public and retailers, the organizers began the search for a suitable alternative in the city center of Munich. The name of the exhibition, Kunstmesse München, was then passed on. In 2004 Konrad O. Bernheimer, grandson of Otto Bernheimer and Chairman of Pictura, the pictures department of TEFAF, launched the "Munich Highlights", which continues the tradition of trade from the original Munich art exhibition and its exhibitors. Art dealers and gallery owners shared their spaces around the Odeonsplatz in Munich with international colleagues and invited the audience to an artistic walk through Munich’s downtown. The name highlights was the focus on the new name of the exhibition "Highlights – Internationale Kunstmesse München" in 2010, and with the change of location back to the Haus der Kunst, the exhibition returned to the traditional location in the Munich Prinzregentenstraße.

== Divisions ==
The exhibition is divided into the following departments:

- Ancient Art
- Medieval manuscripts
- Old Master Paintings
- 19th Century Paintings
- Modern art
- Art on Paper
- Objets d'art
- Artists Union objects
- Sculptures
- Furniture
- Porcelain
- Silver
- Textile arts
- Non-European art

== Literature ==
- Emily D. Bilski (Hg.): Die Kunst- und Antiquitätenfirma Bernheimer, Ausstellung im Jüdischen Museum München, Edition Minerva 2007
- Erste Deutsche Kunst- und Antiquitätenmesse München, Haus der Kunst, München 1956
