= El Lucero =

El Lucero, Diario político, literario y mercantil
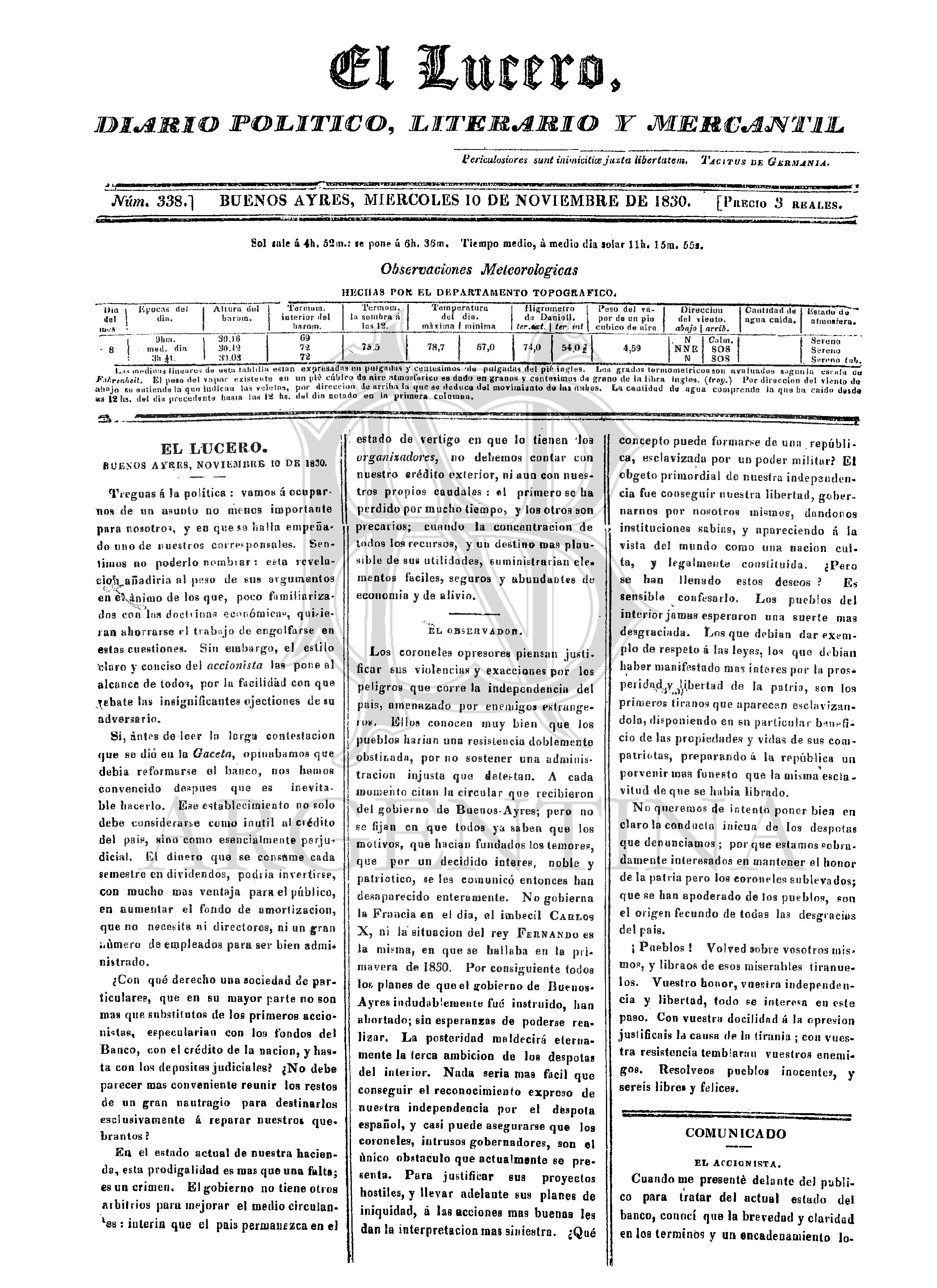
- cover of El Lucero
- Type: newspaper
- Founder: Pedro de Angelis
- Publisher: Imprenta Argentina; Imprenta de la Independencia.
- Editor: Pedro de Ángelis
- Founded: 1829
- Ceased publication: 1833
- Language: Spanish
- City: Buenos Aires
- Country: Argentina

El Lucero. Diario político, literario y mercantil was an Argentine newspaper of the 19th century, edited during the governments of Lavalle, Viamonte, Rosas and Balcarce.

== History ==
El Lucero, was a newspaper whose content was based on politics, literature and business news, founded by Neapolitan journalist Pedro de Ángelis. It was published in the Imprenta Argentina and Imprenta de la Independencia, between September 7, 1829 and July 31, 1833.

== Gallery ==
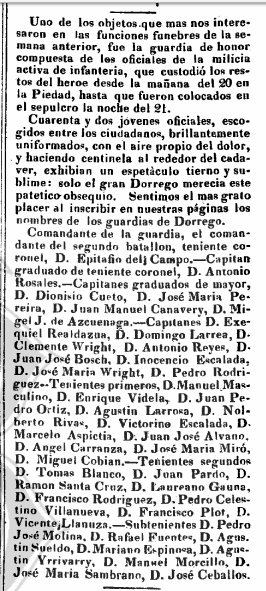
News about the transfer of the remains of Manuel Dorrego.

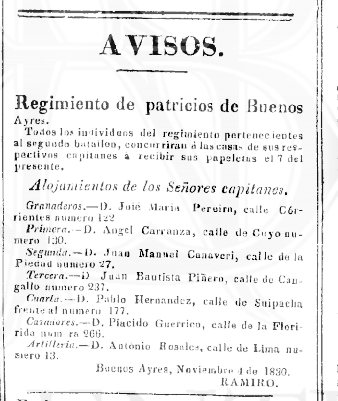
notice concerning the Regiment of Patricians.

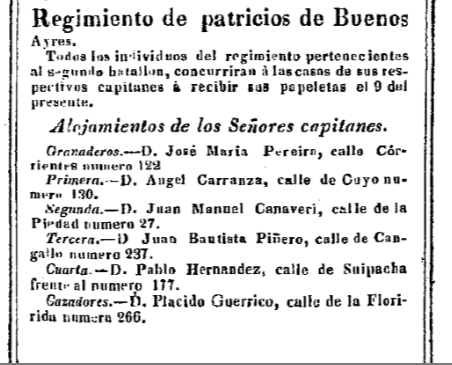
Regiment of Patricians, El Lucero, November 10, 1830.

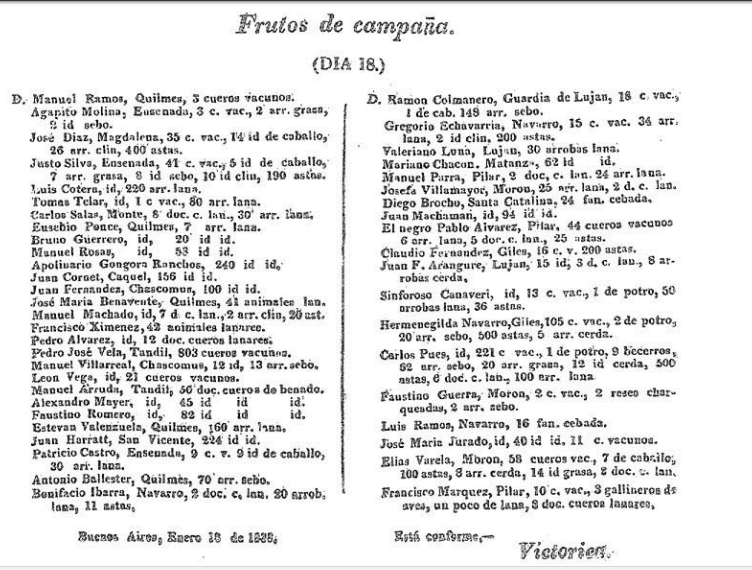
Supply of Leathers of the City.

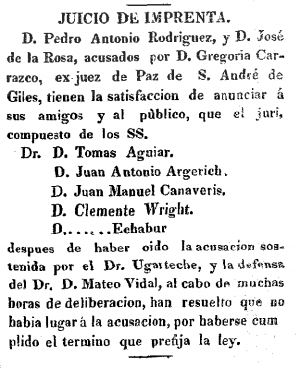
news concerning the town of San Andrés de Giles.
