= Giovanni Battista Torre =

Printer and pyrotechnist (d. 1780)

Giovanni Battista Torre (died 1780) was an Italian printer and pyrotechnist, based in Paris and London. His shops and printing house operated from 1760 to 1799, later with his son Anthony Torré, as Torre & Co. (or variously also as Torrés or occasionally as Torri).

== Family business ==
Giovanni Battista (also known as Giambattista) Torre initially worked as a pyrotechnician, manufacturing fireworks. He worked in London in 1753. In 1760, he opened a shop called "Cabinet de Physique Expérimentale", selling books, prints, barometers and other scientific instruments, on the rue St. Honoré in Paris.

His son Anthony (with another son whose name is given only as "L. Torre") moved to London and opened a shop in Market Lane, also selling prints and scientific instruments. This London business was in operation by 1767, in partnership with another Italian immigrant, Anthony Molteno. A "fire worker" named Mr. Torré is also recorded as operating at Marylebone Gardens, London, between 1772 and 1774.

== Legacy ==
After Giovanni B. Torre died in 1780, Anthony della Torre involved several other partners, before the business eventually became the current Colnaghi Gallery.

For the Paris branch, Anthony first partnered with Charles Ciceri (1780–1782), before Ciceri opened his own business and L.Torre took over the original shop, now moved to Porte St. Antoine, near the Bastille. The Paris business seems to have relied extensively on connections to other art dealers from the Italian expatriate community, across the continent, such as Joseph Zanna (Brussels) and Sebastiano Tessari (Augsburg). In 1784 Anthony hired the new Milanese immigrant, Paul Colnaghi, on Ciceri's recommendation, to run a new shop situated in Palais Royal.

The next year, however, Colnaghi handed over the Paris shop to Pascal Noseda, and moved to London to join Anthony Torre and Anthony Molteno as a third partner there in 1785. They then moved to 132 Pall Mall in 1786. Anthony Torre retired back to Milan in 1788, and after the business operated for a time as Molteno, Colnaghi & Co., Anthony Molteno also left in 1793. Although a "Torre & Dechessa", seems to have operated briefly from 50 Market Lane, according to the London Director (1790–93), the business was continued from then on by Paul Colnaghi and his successors.
