= Calixto Oyuela =

Argentine poet and essayist

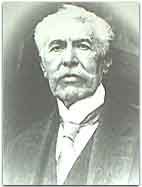

Calixto Oyuela (1857 - June 12, 1935) was an Argentine poet and essayist.

== Early life ==
Calixto was a lawyer by training. He worked for some years as a lawyer before turning to teaching and literary criticism. He then traveled across Europe, in the process earning the membership of the Argentine diplomatic corps. He also rapidly gained renown as a scholar. He became a Professor of Spanish Literature at the National College of Buenos Aires. He also held the position of director of the National Conservatory and also of the Spanish Academy of Language. He was appointed as the first president of the Academia Argentina de Letras and the Ateneo de Buenos Aires. During his lifetime Calixto was celebrated as one of Argentina's best scholars and a prominent figure in the country's cultural renewal.

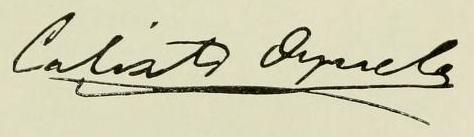
Calixto Oyuela's signature

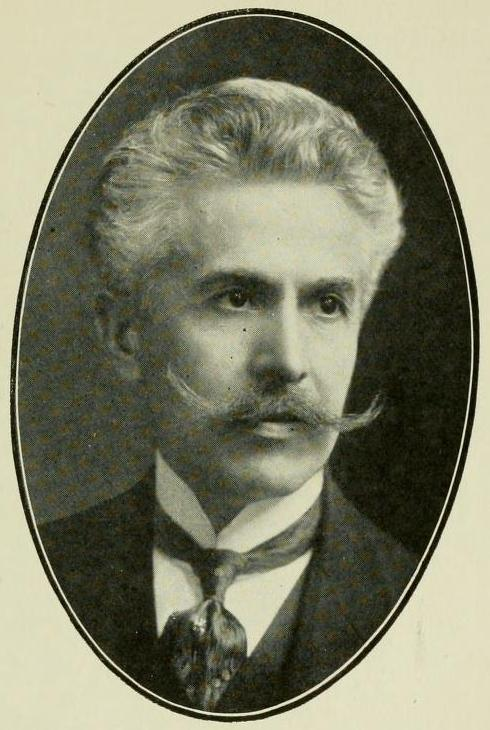
Calixto Oyuela

Cover of Oyuela's poetry collection.

== Works ==
Oyuela remains one of Argentina's most celebrated poets. Works like “Art Canto” (1881), “Eros and Songs” (1891), “Songs of Autumn and Night” reflect his poetic skill. But Oyuela's lyrical, classical yet romantic verse is overshadowed by his vigorous prose. It was prose that brought Oyuela fame. Among his most famous works of prose are Literary Theory Elements of Argentina (1880), Notes On Spanish Literature, and Latin American Poetry Anthology, which won the National Prize for Literature in 1919.

Oyuela founded and was director of the Scientific Literary Magazine. He was at the helm of cultural and literary life in Argentina. He was a member of the Royal Spanish Academy. He also held the past of president of the Academy of Arts of Argentina.

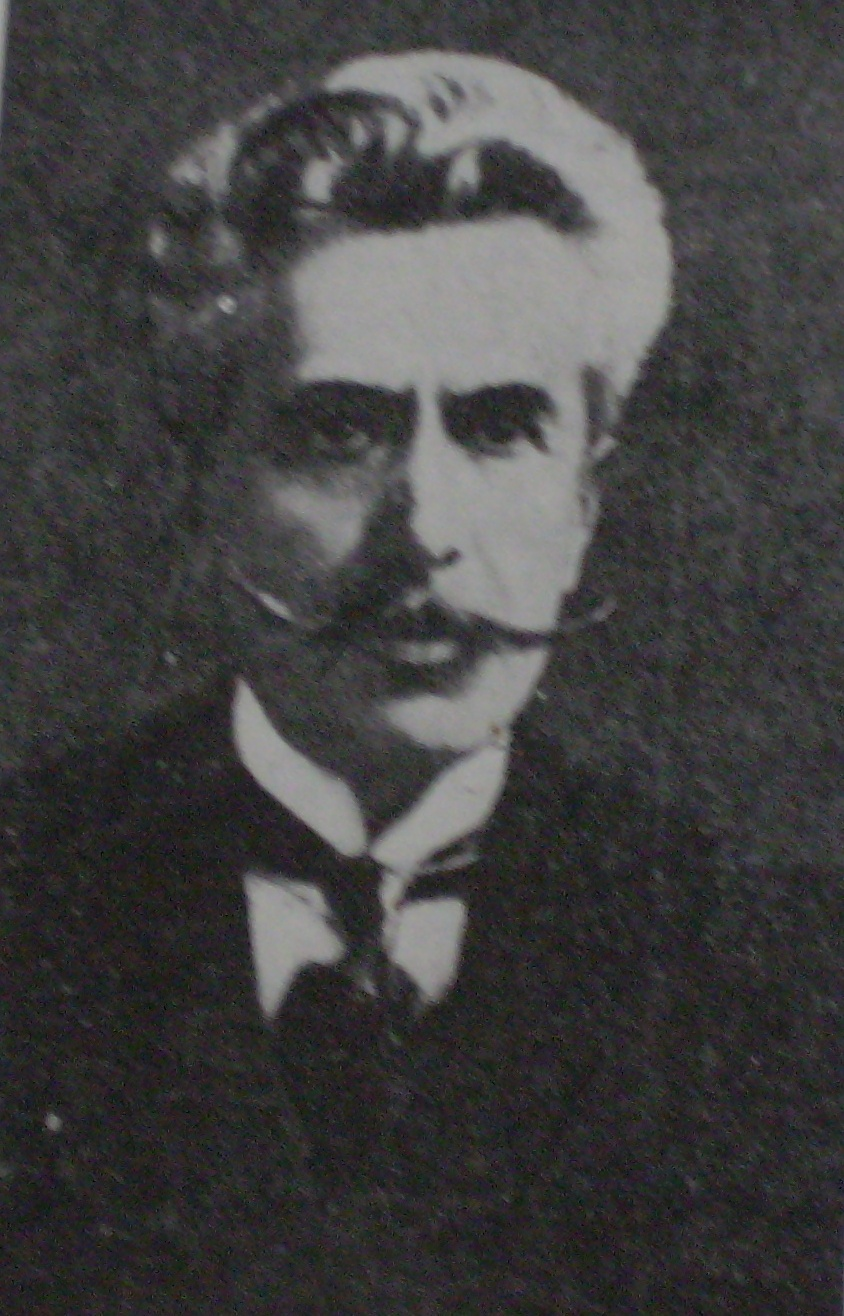
Calixto Oyuela

=== Poems ===
- Noche de Luna
- Eros
- Canta a la patria en su primer centenario
- Elegías

=== Verse ===
- Cantos (1891)
- Nuevos cantos (1905)
- Cantos de otoño (1924)
- Cantos nocturnos (1933)

=== Prose ===
- Canto al arte (1881)
- Crónicas dramáticas (1884)
- Elementos de teoría literaria (1885)
- Estudios y artículos literarios (1889)
- España (1889)
- Estudios literarios (1915)
- Antología poética hispanoamericana (1919)
