= Rubio, Venezuela =

Rubio
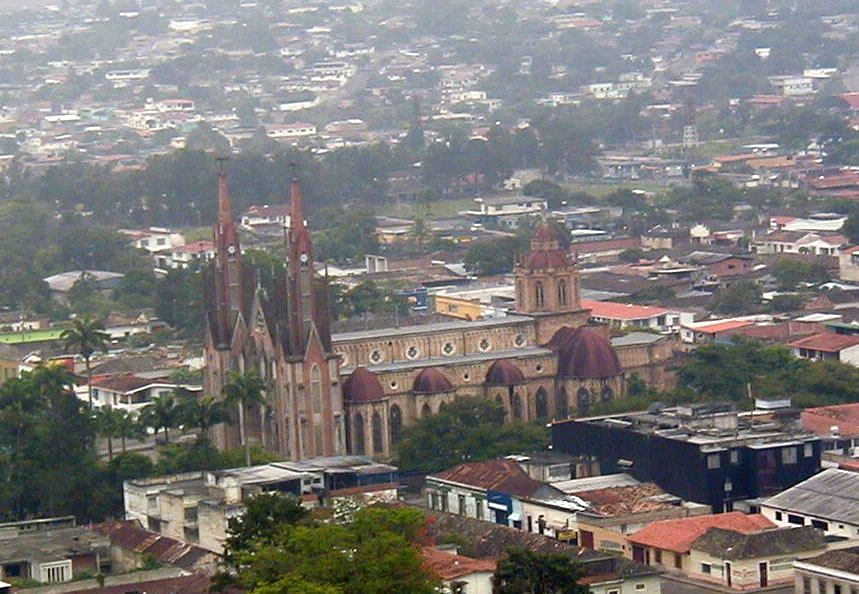
- View of Santa Barbara Cathedral (Iglesia Santa Barbara), from Rubio Community TV Station

- Flag Coat of arms
- Nickname: "La Ciudad Pontalida" (English:"The Bridge City")
- Location within Venezuela
- Coordinates: 7°42′N 72°21′W
- Country: Venezuela
- State: Táchira
- Municipality: Junín
- Founded: December 8, 1794

Government
  - Mayor: Angel Marquez (PSUV)

Area
  - Total: 315 km^{2} (122 sq mi)

Population (2010)
  - Total: 87,249
  - Density: 277/km^{2} (717/sq mi)
  - Demonym: Rubienses -o
- Time zone: UTC−4 (VET)
- Postal code: 5030
- Area code: 0276
- Climate: Aw
- Website: junin-tachira.gob.ve
- The area and population figures are for the municipality

Rubio is a town in the Venezuelan Andean state of Táchira. Founded in 1794 by Gervasio Rubio, this town is the shire town of the Junín Municipality and, according to the 2001 Venezuelan census, the municipality has a population of 68,869.

Rubio is one of the largest towns in the state of Táchira. Its importance derives from its coffee production and the nearby commerce that exists with Colombia. Venezuela's former president, Carlos Andrés Pérez, was also born in Rubio.

Rubio has beautiful natural tunnels called La Cueva de los Miagros. There are some rivers and waterfalls on the outskirts of town. The town has many bridges especially in Old Rubio. For this reason it is called "Ciudad Pontalida" or "City of Bridges." Rubio is located in the west of Estado Táchira and is a 40-minute drive from San Cristóbal, the capital of Táchira.

== History ==
Rubio was founded by Gervasio Rubio in 1794. It was then the capital of the Táchira State, before the capital was moved to San Cristóbal. Rubio is sometimes called "La Ciudad Pontalida" ("The City of Bridges") and housed Christiansen Academy, an international school. The city's economy was once based on coffee production, and today it depends on the tertiary sector and some local agricultural production. The first oil exploration in Venezuela began in 1883 in La Petrolia by the "Compañía Nacional Minera Petrolía del Táchira," and the first well exploited was named Salvador. Due to its numerous hospitals and bank offices, as well as numerous educational institutions, it is known as the educational city of Venezuela. A notable tourist attraction is the neo-Gothic Church of Santa Bárbara, featuring locally made clay bricks.

== Demographics ==
The Junín Municipality, according to the 2001 Venezuelan census, has a population of 68,869 (up from 53,981 in 1990). This amounts to 6.9% of Táchira's population. The municipality's population density is 566.2 people per square mile (218.63/km^{2}).

== Government ==
Rubio is the shire town of the Junín Municipality in Táchira. The mayor of the Junín Municipality is Angel Marquez Elected in 2017 after winning the elections against Jobel Sandoval at the end of 2017

The economy of the city is based on coffee production. The first exploitation of oil in Venezuela (1883) was in La Petrolia by the company "Compañia Nacional Minera Petrolía del Táchira" and the first well was called "Salvador" ("Savior").

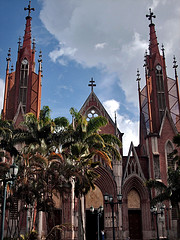
Santa Bárbara de Rubio Cathedral

== Sites of interest ==
=== Religious buildings ===
- Catedral de Santa Bárbara de Rubio

=== Squares and parks ===
- Plaza Simón Bolívar
- Parque la Petrolia
- Plaza Urdaneta
- Plaza Gervasio Rubio

== Notable people ==
- Carlos Andrés Pérez, President of Venezuela (1974–1979) and (1989–1993).
- Leonardo Ruiz Pineda, Political Leader in Venezuela Founder of AD
- Carlos Zapata, Architect.
- Konrad Bernheimer, Art Dealer and Collector
- Roberto Giusti, Journalist and Author
