= Kunstmesse München =

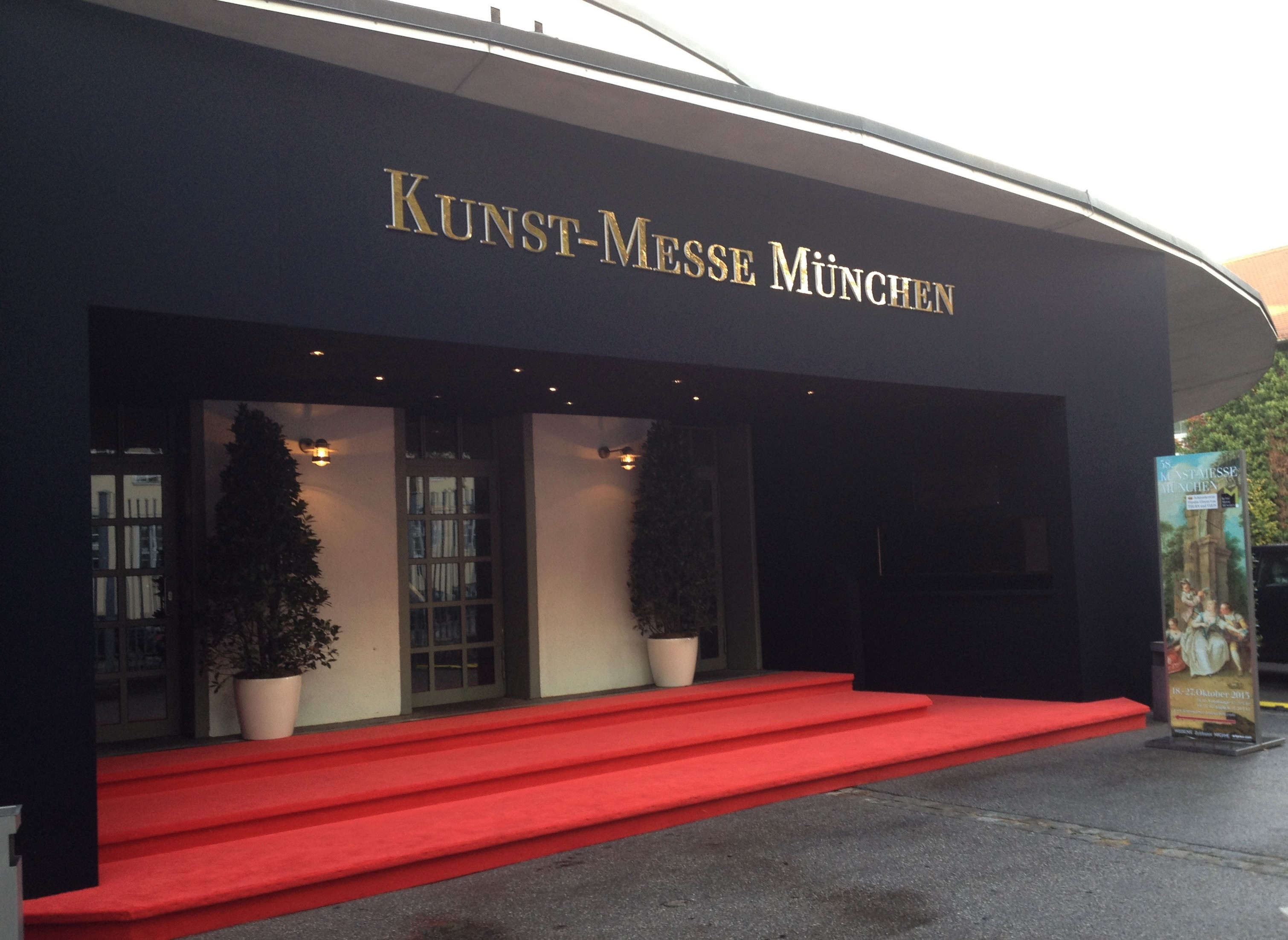
Main entrance of Kunstmesse München 58 in 2013

The Kunstmesse München (Munich Art Fair) is the oldest art and antiques fair in Germany. Held annually in the autumn with a run-time of ten days, it is a fair for the general public, attended by leading national and international exhibitors. For some time now its venue is the historic Postpalast in Munich, on Wredestraße near the Hackerbrücke. The offer ranges from Protohistory and Ancient History (such as Egypt) via the arts and crafts of the Middle Ages, and the Renaissance through to art and design of Modernism until approximately 1970, with occasional exceptions. The fair is organised by Expo Management Kiel, its conceptual sponsor is, in continuation of the Deutscher Kunsthandelsverband, the newly founded Kunsthändlerverband Deutschland (a registered association).

== History ==
The Kunstmesse München set out in 1956 as Deutsche Kunst und Antiquitätenmesse under the conceptual sponsorship of the Deutscher Kunsthandelsverband. Until 1988, the leading event of its kind, it took place in the Haus der Kunst in Munich. Thereafter it was, for reasons of space, relocated to the Messe München (Munich Trade Fair), finally in the fairground at Riem. After a re-organization (and a transitory name change to Fine Art & Antiques for legal reasons), the historic Postpalast in Munich was determined as the venue.

== Offer ==
The offer comprises all periods and basically all genres of arts and crafts are on show, although the focus may vary. Objects from art and curiosity cabinets and textile art (rugs and carpets) are included, so are vintage cars.

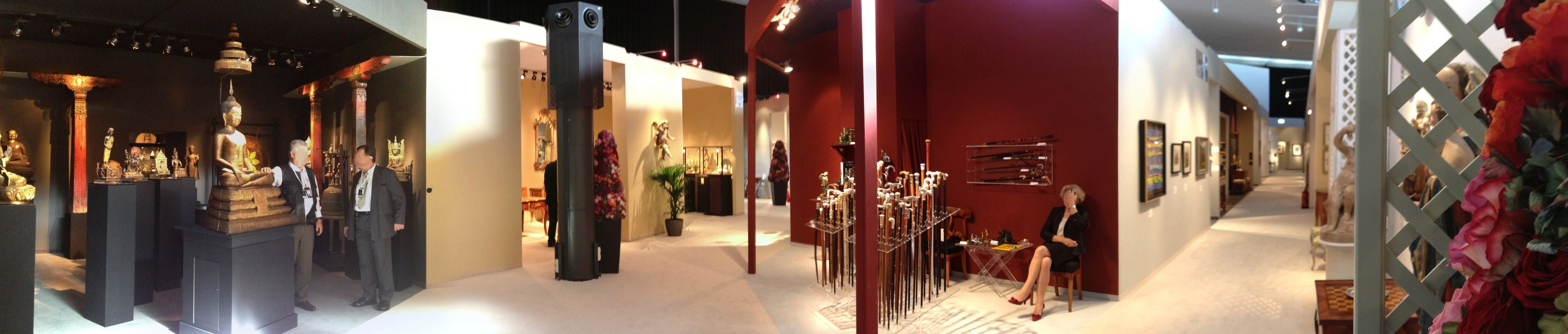
Panoramic view of Kunstmesse München 58 in Munich's Postpalast 2013

== Catalogues ==
- Erste Deutsche Kunst- und Antiquitätenmesse München, Katalog zur Verkaufsausstellung im Haus der Kunst, Haus der Kunst, mit einem Beitrag von Inge Feuchtmayr, Munich 1956
- All subsequent catalogues in WorldCat

== See also ==
- Highlights – Internationale Kunstmesse München
