= Roberto Giusti =

Venezuelan journalist (1954–2025)

Roberto Antonio Giusti Aranguren (23 June 1954 – 22 January 2025) was a Venezuelan journalist. He worked at numerous newspapers, including El Nacional and El Universal. He wrote a lot of books, including Yo Lo Viví, Memorias Inconclusas, and Pasión Guerrilla. He worked for Globovisión TV and was the host of Primera Página and Grado 33.

== Background ==
Giusti was born in Rubio, Venezuela. He died on 22 January 2025, at the age of 71.

== Death threats ==
On 13 May 2003, Giusti, host of the Radio Caracas Radio program Golpe a Golpe ("coup to coup") with Fausto Masso, filed a complaint with the Public Prosecutor's Office denouncing the death threats he had been receiving. On 2 May, a group of about fifty people entered the studios of Radio Caracas Radio and began shouting offensive slogans at the journalist and calling him a "murderer". The attackers sprayed graffiti on the building's walls and Giusti's car. Giusti called for an investigation into the incident and possible links to his reports on the presence of the government of Hugo Chávez and Colombian guerrillas in Venezuela.

== Interview With the Guerrilla ==
In the state of Táchira, Venezuela, the guerrilla was kidnapping and taking money from the farmers who lived there. Giusti, who grew up in that state, knew some of the farmers and decided to do something. He went to Táchira from Caracas and started investigating. After talking to some of the local farmers, he decided to interview some members of the Guerrilla. After a year of negotiations, the members of the Guerrilla and Giusti agreed on an interview in a Guerrilla camp. He was interviewing Commander Alexis. While interviewing him, Commander Alexis admitted to killing eight members of the Venezuelan Marine Corps in the famous Cararabo Massacre in 1995. He then crossed the border to Colombia to interview Raul Reyes, an important FARC member. Reyes said that he was like Hugo Chávez, a Marxist–Leninist. Giusti later found a Colombian Guerrilla camp in Venezuela and reported it through the El Universal newspaper. When the Government of Colombia was going to Venezuela to the reunion between Venezuelan president Hugo Chávez and Colombian president Álvaro Uribe, they invited Giusti to it in Puerto Ordaz. The Colombian Government gave him a map of all the camps of the Guerrilla in Venezuela, and he released it. He later received threats from the Venezuelan Government and the Guerrilla, but they did not mess with him.

== Books ==
- Hernández, Ramón, and Roberto Giusti. Carlos Andrés Pérez: Memorias Proscritas. Caracas: Los Libros de El Nacional, 2006
