= Marquartstein =

- Municipality
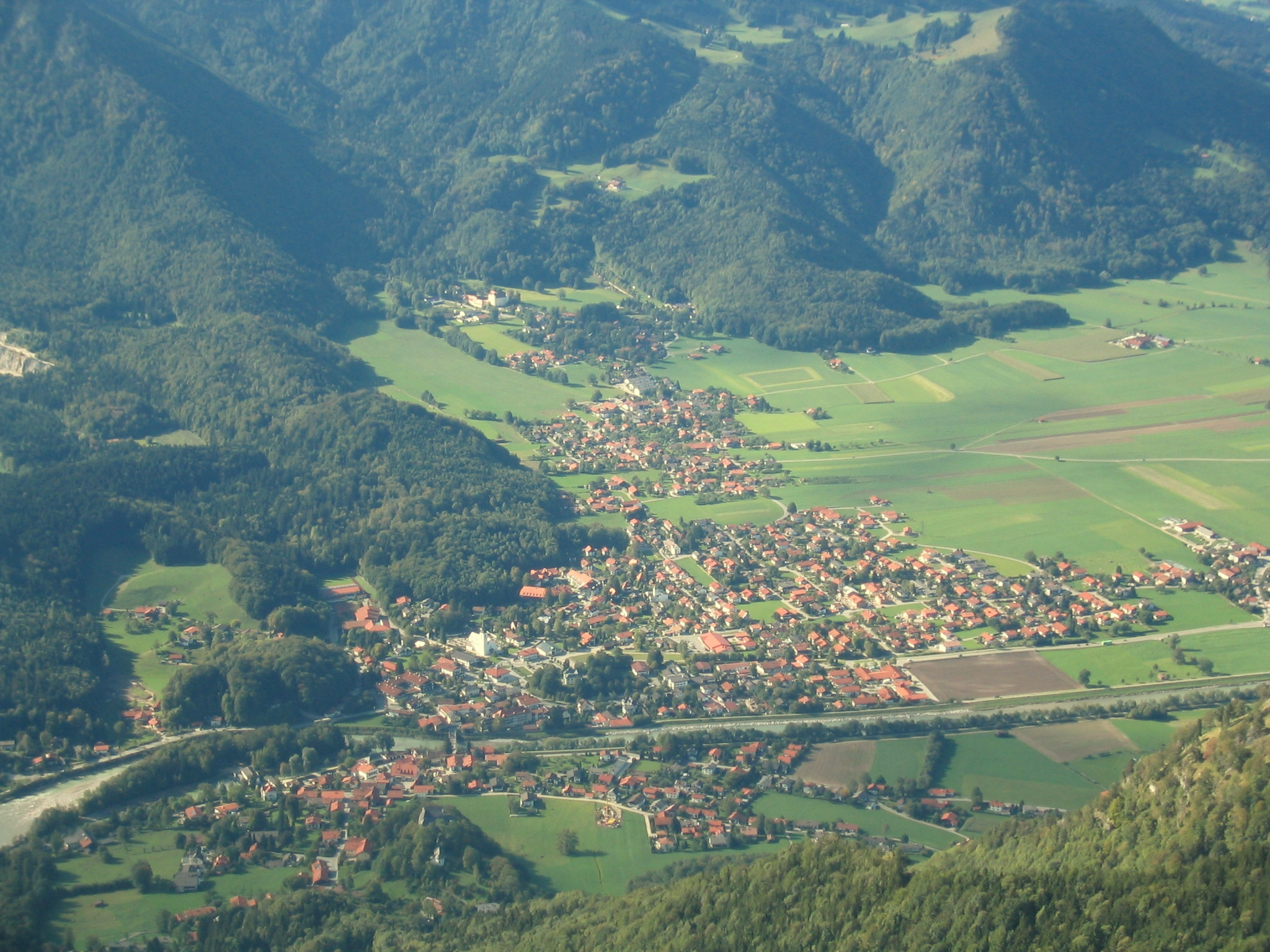
- Aerial view

- Coat of arms

- Location of Marquartstein within Traunstein district
- Interactive map of Marquartstein
- Location within Germany Location within Bavaria
- Coordinates: 47°45′31″N 12°27′42″E
- Country: Germany
- State: Bavaria
- Admin. region: Oberbayern
- District: Traunstein
- Municipal assoc.: Marquartstein

Government
  - Mayor (2020–26): Andreas Scheck

Area
  - Total: 13.4 km^{2} (5.2 sq mi)
- Elevation: 530–800 m (1,740–2,620 ft)

Population (2025-12-31)
  - Total: 3,014
  - Density: 225/km^{2} (583/sq mi)
- Time zone: UTC+01:00 (CET)
  - Summer (DST): UTC+02:00 (CEST)
- Postal codes: 83250
- Dialling codes: 08641
- Vehicle registration: TS
- Website: www.marquartstein.de

Marquartstein (German pronunciation: [ˈmaʁkvaʁtˌʃtaɪn]) is a municipality in the southeastern part of Bavaria, Germany and is part of the Verwaltungsgemeinschaft Marquartstein and Staudach-Egerndach. It is situated in a region called Chiemgau, approximately 10 km south of Lake Chiemsee between Munich and Salzburg. Most of the area is situated in the valley of the river Tiroler Achen, which separates the village into two parts. Marquartstein is at the edge of the Alps. Its geographical location is 47°46′N 12°28′E.

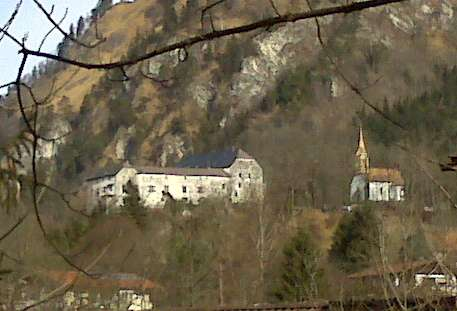
Burg Marquartstein as seen from the local riverside of Tiroler Ache

== Brief history ==
- 1075: Burg Marquartstein was founded
- 1803: Pflegamt (municipal jurisdiction) was united with the court in Traunstein
- 1857: the castle ruin was rebuilt by Cajetan Freiherr von Tautphoeus
- 1884: railway from Übersee was built
- 1890-1908 The composer Richard Strauss lived in Marquartstein
- 1958 Romanian-American actress Tala Birell was buried in the village
- 1978: Marquartstein becomes head of the Verwaltungsgemeinschaft Marquartstein and Staudach-Egerndach

== Education ==
Marquartstein plays an important role in the local education. Almost all major school types are situated in the village:

- the Landschulheim Marquartstein, a Gymnasium (highest-grade secondary school) with a boarding school
- the Achental-Realschule, a medium-level secondary school
- the Pädagogisches Zentrum Schloss Niedernfels (Pedagogic Centre Niedernfels Castle), a private catholic secondary school
