= Nursing Madonna with an Angel =

Painting by Antonio da Correggio from 1520

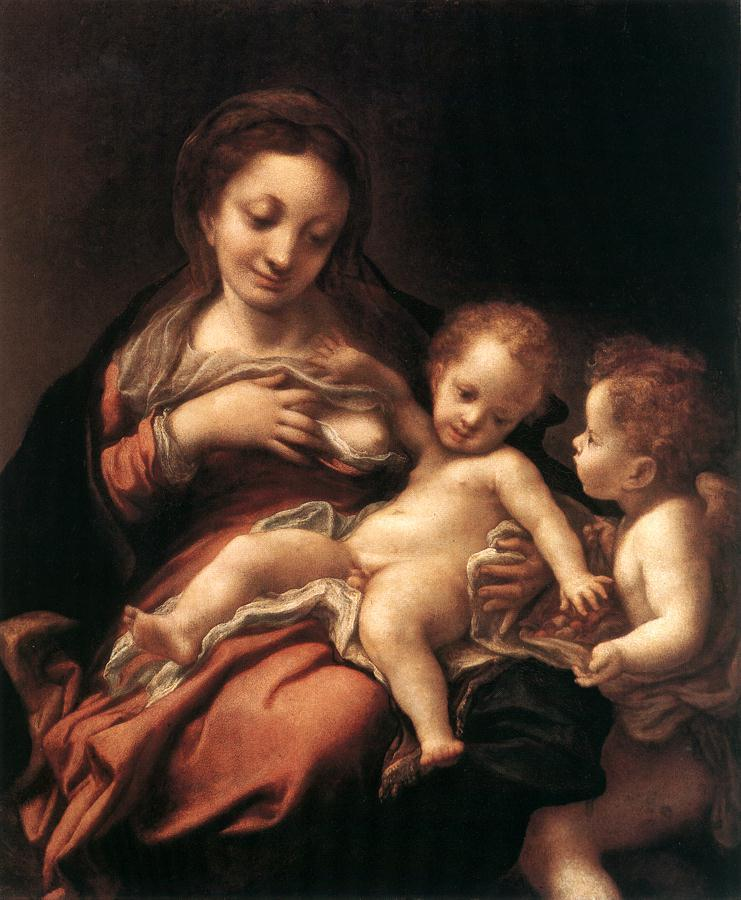
- Artist: Antonio da Correggio
- Year: c. 1524
- Type: oil paint on panel
- Dimensions: 69 cm × 57 cm (27 in × 22 in)
- Location: Museum of Fine Arts, Budapest

Nursing Madonna with an Angel is an oil painting on panel by Correggio, painted around 1524 and now in the Museum of Fine Arts in Budapest. It measures 68.5 by 87 cm and belongs to the Nursing Madonna or Madonna Lactans genre.

== History ==
The painting's style places it around the same time as the commission of paintings for the Del Bono Chapel in the abbey church of San Giovanni Evangelista, that is at the start of the 1530s. Nothing more is known about who commissioned it or when, and the first documentary evidence for it is a 1603 inventory of the Aldobrandini collection in Rome, where it was probably admired by Federico Barocci and later by the young Anthony van Dyck and Pietro da Cortona. It was praised by Giulio Ottonelli in his Trattato della Pittura e della Scultura, uso et abuso loro as a model to explain how a religious subject could succeed unlike a secular one. According to Ottonelli, the main Roman cardinals of the 17th century competed to possess the Nursing Madonna. There is an engraving of the painting and a drawing of it by Lelio Orsi.
