= Pedro de Ángelis =

Italian journalist, historian and politician

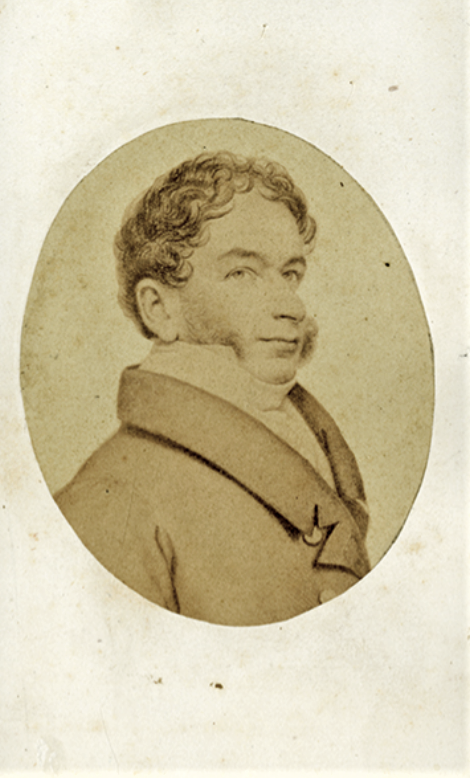
- Pedro de Ángelis

Personal details
- Born: June 29, 1784 Naples, Italy
- Died: February 10, 1859 (aged 74) Buenos Aires, Argentina
- Resting place: La Recoleta Cemetery
- Spouse: Mélanie Dayet
- Occupation: Historian; Publisher; Statesman
- Profession: Journalist

Pedro de Ángelis (1784–1859) was an Italian journalist, historian and politician. He had an outstanding performance in Argentina where he founded the newspaper El Lucero.

== Biography ==
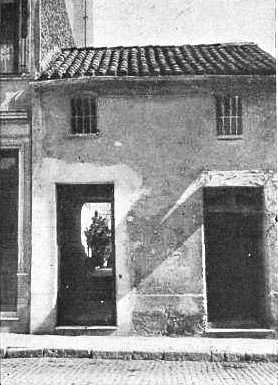
residence of Buenos Aires where Pedro de Angelis lived.

He was born in Naples, the son of Domenico de Ángelis and Juliet de Rossi, belonging to a noble Italian family. He served in the Napoleonic armies during the French occupation of Naples. He visited and then resided in some European cities, including Paris and Geneva, where he possibly met his wife, the Swiss Mélanie Dayet.

In 1827, he arrived in Buenos Aires where he was in charge of the Imprenta del Estado, and founded several newspapers, among them El Conciliador and El Lucero. From his editorials he supported the government of Juan Manuel de Rosas. In 1833, he published El Restaurador de las Leyes.

He traveled to Rio de Janeiro after the fall of the Rosas government, returning to Argentina shortly after. In 1858, he was appointed as Consul General of the Kingdom of the Two Sicilies before the Argentine Confederation.

Pedro de Ángelis was a member of the Société de Géographie of Paris, the Royal Geographical Society of London, the Massachusetts Historical Society and American Philosophical Society. He was related to the main writers of the time like Jean Charles Léonard de Sismondi, a personal friend.

Among his best works is included Colección de Obras y Documentos relativos a la Historia Antigua y Moderna de las Provincias del Río de la Plata, a book of several volumes on Argentine history from the beginning of colonization to the Revolution of May, and the Declaration of Independence.
