= Otto Bernheimer =

German art and antique dealer (1877–1960)

- Born: Otto Bernheimer; 14 July 1877; Munich, Germany
- Died: 5 July 1960 (aged 82)
- Occupations: Chairman and owner, Bernheimer Fine Old Masters
- Children: Kurt Bernheimer
- Parent: Lehmann Bernheimer
- Relatives: Konrad Bernheimer (grandson)

Otto Bernheimer (14 July 1877 – 5 July 1960) was a German collector of art, and an antique dealer.

== Life ==
Otto Bernheimer, born 1877 in Munich, was the son of a supplier to the royal Bavarian court Lehmann Bernheimer (1841–1918), who started the trading business in Munich in 1864. With his two brothers, Max and Ernst (1875–1956), Otto traveled to many European countries in search of fine art. Bernheimer's customers were European aristocrats, financiers, diplomats, and artists. They included the Krupp family and William Randolph Hearst. Bernheimer offered not only exclusive pieces, but also complete room amenities to its customers.

After the death of his father in 1918 Otto took over the company in its second generation, due to the difficult economic situation the business was suffering. After the Machtergreifung 1933, the business volume increased because of the demand for prestige items. In the Kristallnacht in 1938, the shop windows were smashed and Otto Bernheimer was imprisoned in the Dachau concentration camp. Through the intervention of the Mexican government – Bernheimer was Honorary Consul of Mexico – he and his sons were released. The family emigrated across the whole world. Otto Bernheimer was forced to purchase a rundown coffee plantation in Venezuela from a relative of Hermann Göring. The Aryanization of "Art Dealer Otto Bernheimer" (later the "Munich art market society" and "camaraderie of artists") led to the confiscation of all property including a collection of German and French paintings from the 19th century.

== After the war ==
In August 1945, Otto Bernheimer returned to Munich, rebuilt the war-damaged commercial building and his company again and fought for the restitution of the family property. In 1948, he was able to resume business with a focus on the fabric and furnishings department again. Through his initiative the "Deutsche Kunst und Antiquitätenmesse" was founded in Munich in 1956 at the beginning of the economic miracle years and Bernheimer was elected president of the German art trade association.

In addition to the office building at Lenbachplatz in Munich, the Bernheimer-Haus, Otto Bernheimer owned a villa in Feldafing at Lake Starnberg, which in 1912–13 was built by architect Max Littmann in the Höhenbergstraße. After restitution in the 1950s Otto Bernheimer gave the Villa to the community of Feldafing which since 1934 had used the building as a primary school. The school bears the name "Otto-Bernheimer-Grundschule".

== Awards ==
- 1959 Bavarian Order of Merit

== Literature ==
- Bernheimer, Otto (1957). Erinnerungen eines alten Münchners (in German). München: Kindler-Verlag.
- Pfeiffer-Belli, Erich (1964). 100 Jahre in München (in German). München.
- Walk, Josph (October 1988). Kurzbiographien zur Geschichte der Juden 1918-1945 (in German). München: K. G. Saur Verlag Gmbh & Co (October 1988). ISBN 978-3-598-10477-0.
- Bernheimer, Konrad O. (11 September 2013). Narwalzahn und Alte Meister (in German). Hamburg: Hoffmann und Campe. ISBN 978-3-455-50280-0.
