= Junín Municipality, Táchira =

Junín Municipality Municipio Junín
- Municipality
- Flag Coat of arms

- Location in Táchira

- Location in Venezuela
- Coordinates: 7°36′22″N 72°22′21″W
- Country: Venezuela
- State: Táchira
- Municipal seat: Rubio

Government
  - Mayor: Jackson Carrillo (MUD)

Area
  - Total: 308.0 km^{2} (118.9 sq mi)

Population (2011 -> 2019 projection)
  - Total: 88,699 -> 92,805
  - Density: 288.0/km^{2} (745.9/sq mi)
- Time zone: UTC−4 (VET)

The Junín Municipality is one of the 29 municipalities that makes up the western Venezuelan state of Táchira and, according to the 2011 Venezuelean census, the municipality had a population of 88,699. The mayor of the municipality is Jackson Carrillo of the MUD party since November 2021 and the town of Rubio is the municipal seat of the Junín Municipality. The municipality is divided into four parishes; Bramon, Junín, La Petrolea, and Quinimarí.

== Demographics ==
Based on the 2011 Venezuelan census, The population of the Junín Municipality was 88,699 people, accounting for 7.4% of the total population of the state of Táchira. The majority (81.66%) of the municipality's population is in the town of Rubio, the municipal seat.

By June 2019, official projections from the Venezuelan Statistics National Institute estimated the population of Junín as 92,805 people, representing an annual growth rate of 0.57% since 2011 and showing a population density of 446.2 inhabitants/km². However, these projections do not account for the impact of emigration linked to the country's recent economic and political circumstances.

The gender distribution of the population was 49.4% men (39,864) and 50.6% women (40,816). The age distribution showed that the largest segment of the population was aged 15 to 64, comprising 69.1% of the people. Younger people aged 0 to 14 made up 23.8% of the population, while those aged 65 and older accounted for 7.1%. The municipality is mostly urbanized, with 88.8% of inhabitants (71,671) living in urban centers compared to just 11.2% (9,009) in rural areas.

Ethnically, the municipality identified as predominantly White people (57.2%) and Mestizo (41.8%). Minority groups included 0.5% Afro-Venezuelans, a small indigenous population of 12 individuals, and 0.4% belonging to other ethnic groups. The literacy rate was 96.6%, with 2,309 inhabitants of Junín not able to read or write.

== Government ==
The mayor of the Junín Municipality is Jackson Carrillo of the Democratic Unity Roundtable (MUD) party. He won the election in November 2021 with 37.12% of the vote, beating the sitting mayor Ángel Márquez who received 34.86%. In July 2025, he was re-elected, receiving 56.93% of the vote. The municipality is divided into four parishes; Bramon, Junín, La Petrolea, and Quinimarí.
