= Jorge Coll =

Spanish art dealer (born 1977/8)

- Born: 1977 or 1978 (age 47–48)
- Occupation: Art dealer
- Title: CEO, Colnaghi

Jorge Coll (born 1977/1978) is a Spanish art dealer, and the CEO of Colnaghi, one of the world's oldest art galleries and dealerships.

== Early life ==
The son of a Spanish art dealer, Coll grew up in Barcelona and after finishing his studies spent four years working in his family's art dealing business.

== Career ==
In 2005, in partnership with Nicolas Cortés, he founded Coll & Cortés, an art dealership based in Madrid. In 2012 they expanded and opened a gallery in London's Mayfair district. In October 2015, Coll and Cortés merged with Colnaghi, one of the world's oldest art galleries, and Jorge assumed the role of CEO. Coll and Cortés had already sold works of art to more than 40 museums, including the Metropolitan Museum of Art, the Louvre and the Prado.

Colnaghi has since moved into a new custom-built gallery in St. James's in London and opened a gallery space in a townhouse in New York’'s Upper East Side led by Carlos A. Picón, formerly the curator in charge of the Department of Greek and Roman Art at The Metropolitan Museum of Art.

In October 2017, Coll and his business partner Nicolas Cortés established the Colnaghi Foundation, a not-for-profit organisation aiming to promote historic art to a 21st-century audience.

Coll is on the board of trustees of The European Fine Art Fair (TEFAF), and also serves on the boards of the International Council of the Wallace Collection, London Art Week and the International Advisory Council of the Hispanic Museum and Library. In 2017, he was listed in 40 Under 40 feature in Apollo Magazine. In 2018, Coll was a speaker at The New York Times' Art Leaders Network Conference in Berlin.
