= Virgin and Child with an Angel (Botticelli, Boston) =

Painting by Sandro Botticelli

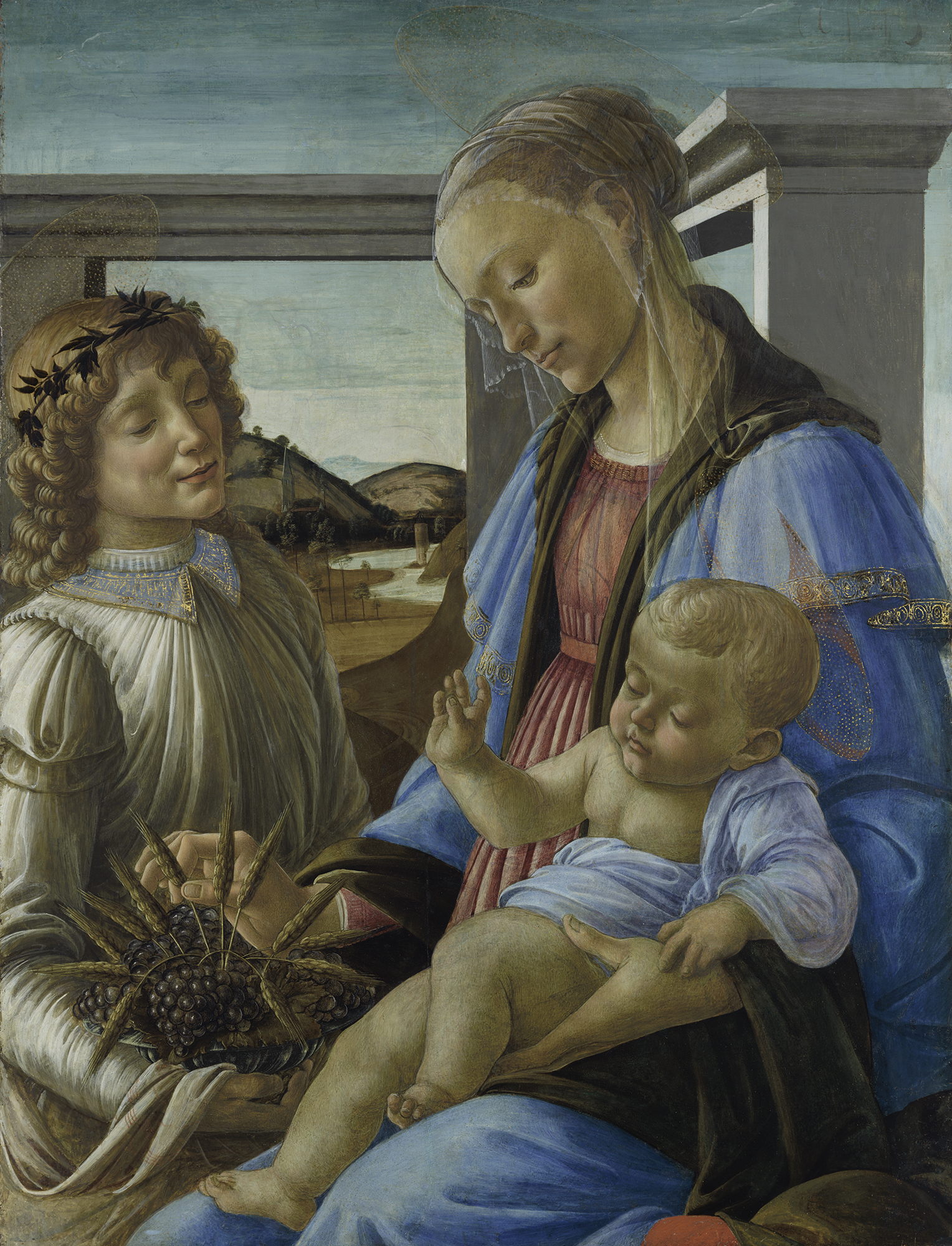

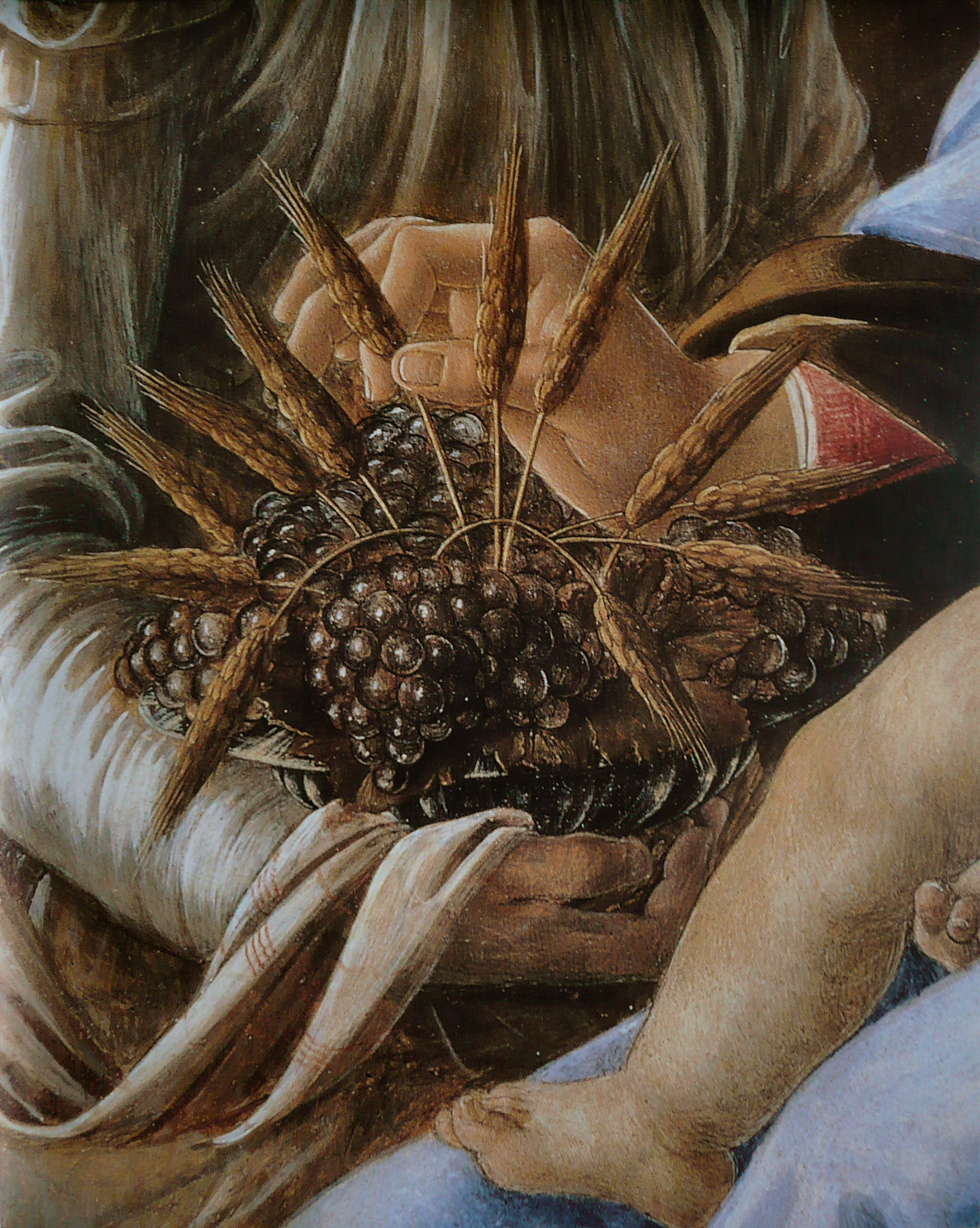
Detail

Virgin and Child with an Angel also known as Our Lady of the Eucharist (Italian: Madonna dell'Eucarestia) is a painting in tempera on wood panel by the Italian Renaissance master Sandro Botticelli, executed in c. 1470. It is now held by the Isabella Stewart Gardner Museum in Boston, Massachusetts, having been acquired from Prince Chigi in 1899. The painting measures 85.2 × 65 centimetres (33.5 × 25.6 in) and is one of a series of paintings of the Madonna produced by Botticelli between 1465 and 1470. It shows influences from Filippo Lippi's Virgin and Child with Two Angels of c. 1465 in the Uffizi.

The Virgin Mary is shown in a three-quarter view, with the Christ Child held on her lap. A smiling angel, wearing a crown of myrtle, offers them a bowl containing twelve ears of wheat and grapes. The child raises a hand in benediction, and Mary holds one of the ears of corn.

The scene may be set in a walled garden or hortus conclusus, symbolic of Mary's virginity, with a landscape of hills and a river visible through an opening in the arcade around the wall. The wheat and grapes are symbolic of the bread and wine of the Eucharist, which themselves symbolise the body and blood of the incarnate Jesus, and the number of ears possibly refer to the number of the apostles at the Last Supper.

Prince Chigi first offered the painting to Isabella Stewart Gardner in 1899 for $30,000. Although "[e]gged on relentlessly by Berenson" to purchase "the so-called Chigi Madonna", she demurred initially, and by the time she decided to buy the price was $70,000. The sale was controversial in Italy, where there was press comment that the sale was illegal, and Prince Chigi was fined. The painting was exhibited at Colnaghi in London before being transported to Boston.

== See also ==
- List of works by Sandro Botticelli
