= Bernheimer-Haus =

Building in Munich, Germany

Coordinates: 48°08′28″N 11°34′05″E

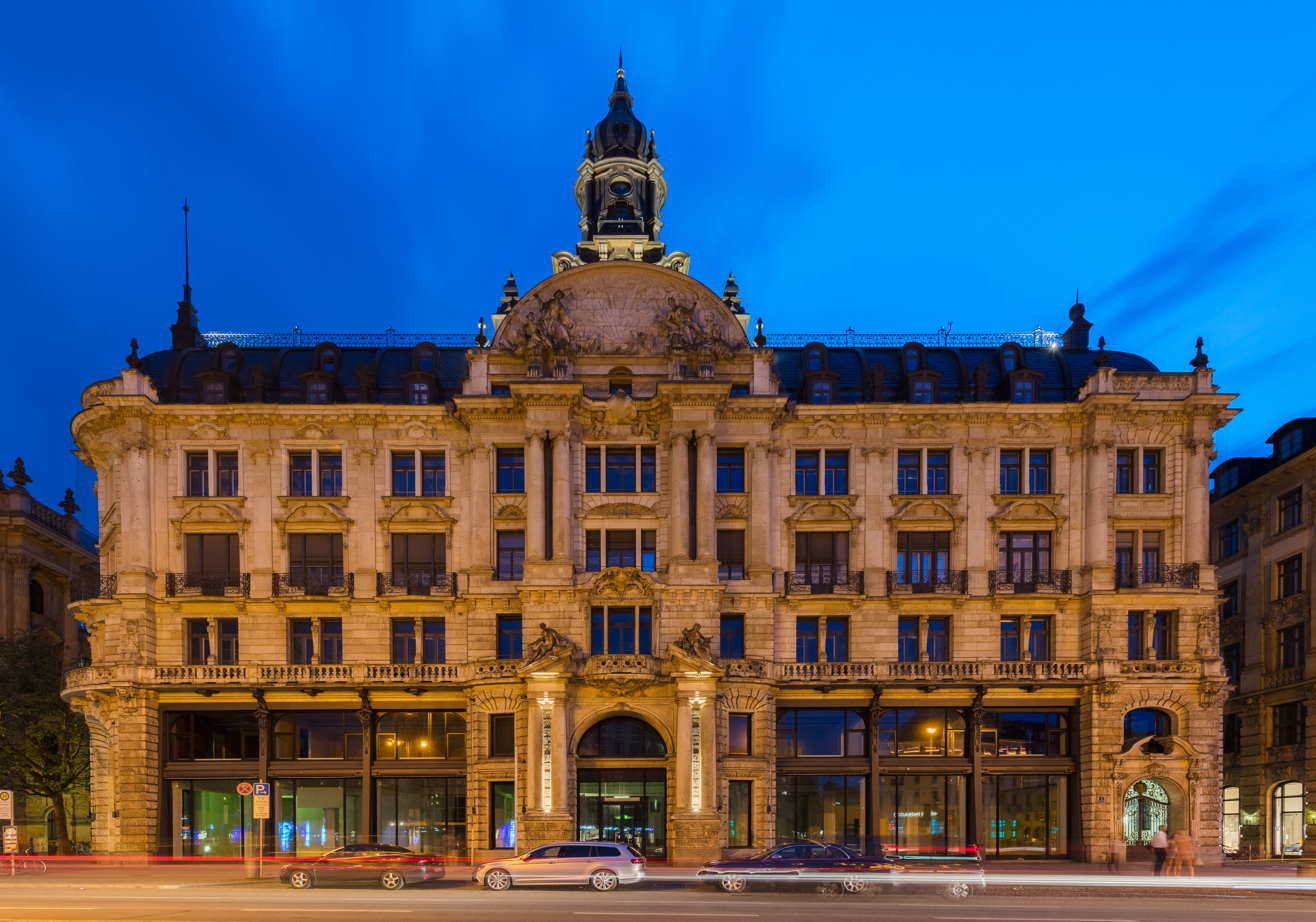
Bernheimer-Haus, 2017

The Bernheimer-Haus, also known as the Bernheimer Palace, is a residential and commercial building located on Lenbachplatz 3 in Munich. The building was built in 1888/89 by architect Friedrich von Thiersch with a neo-baroque style façade designed by his apprentice Martin Dülfer, making the building one of the first of its kind and later the most influential for all other buildings of its type in Munich. The building is protected as cultural heritage.

== History ==
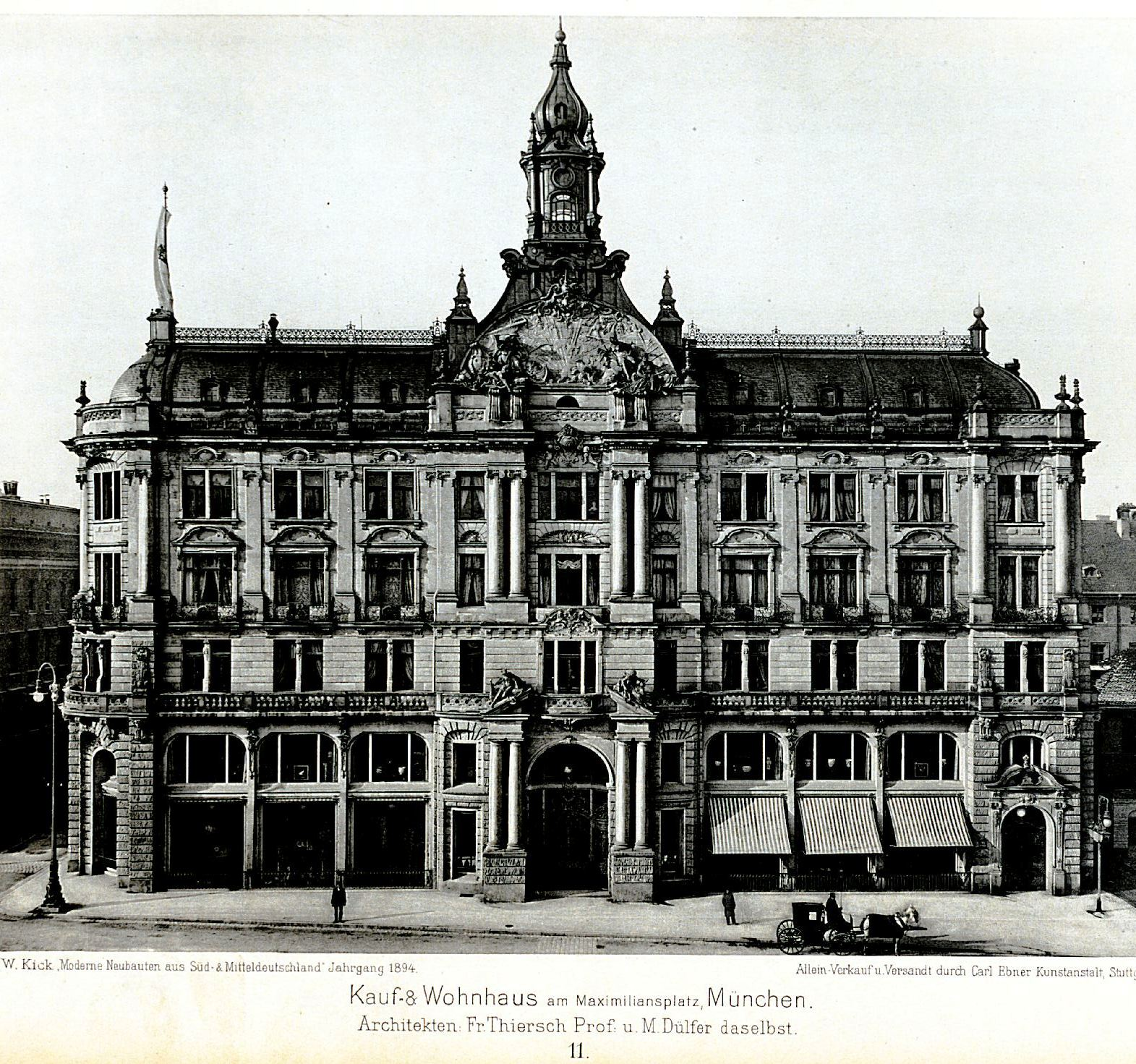
Bernheimer-Haus, before 1895

The Lenbachplatz is located on the abandoned western Munich city fortifications. It is located north of Stachus and goes northeast into the Maximiliansplatz. The western side is the location of three spacious and stylistically coherent structures from the period between 1887 and 1905. The Bernheimer Palace was the first of them to be built. As the surrounding area became more appealing, the original two neighboring buildings were torn down and replaced with new buildings in the style of the Bernheimer Palace.

In 1864, Lehmann Bernheimer founded a business for high-quality textiles in Munich’s old town and expanded his business with the manufacture of luxury goods for the living area. In 1882, he became the provider of goods to the Bavarian royal family, which allowed him to take over the old building located in the Altstadt, which still held its medieval floor plans, and planned to turn it into a representative of new architecture. In 1887, he bought a small coffee house with a beer garden, which was owned and run by an Englishman, therefore called the English Café. This stretched between Ottostraße and Lenbachplatz, where the building was set back from the Ottostraße. The beer garden covered the full width of the property from Lenbachplatz, and this is where the Bernheimer’s commercial building was built. Bernheimer was well integrated in the highest circles of Munich society, and because of this, the grand opening of his office building was made in December 1889 by Prince Regent Luitpold.

In February 1897, a fire broke out in the basement, where the inventory and portions of the building were severely damaged. The building could be reopened at the time of Pentecost in 1897. When the building was being repaired, the coffee house was integrated. Starting in 1900, Bernheimer added antiques, tapestry, and valuable carpets to the assortment. As the business grew, the existing premises were insufficient, and in 1909/10, Bernheimer-Haus was completed with the construction of a rearward building. In 1918, Lehmann Bernheimer's son, Otto Bernheimer, took over the business. During the Nazi dictatorship, the company was initially protected because Otto Bernheimer was an Honorary Consul of Mexico. In 1938/39, after destruction and threats during the November Pogrom, the company was aryanized, and the Bernheimer family was initially detained in Dachau and then forced into exile.

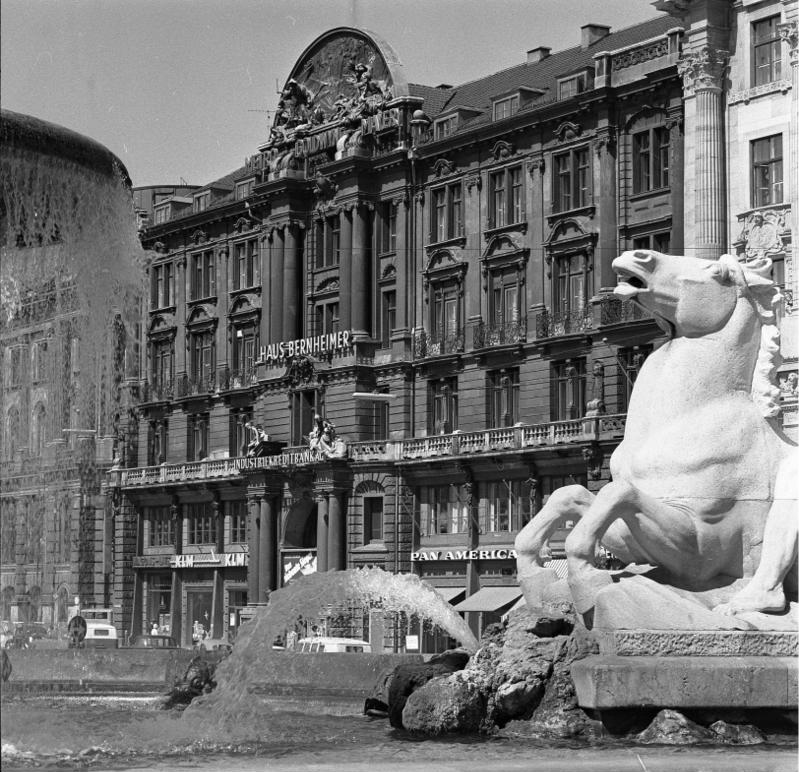
State in 1962, with a simplified roof

During the Second World War, the building was damaged, including the roof with the spire caving in. After the war, Otto Bernheimer, who had returned from Venezuela in 1946, received Bernheimer-Haus again as Wiedergutmachung. He restored the roof by building it in a simplified form. On the main floor, a movie theater was built, which later became the local dance hall. In 1948, Otto Bernheimer started with the art trade. In 1977, Otto Bernheimer's grandson, Konrad Bernheimer, took over. The company was specializing in Old Master paintings from the 16th to 19th centuries, and it was then renamed as Bernheimer Fine Old Masters.

In 1987, Konrad Berheimer sold the building in order to pay his co-heirs and to be able to finance his gallery. The building was purchased by real estate broker Jürgen Schneider, who commissioned architect Alexander von Branca to modernize and remodel the inside, as well as start the extremely complicated restoration of the historically protected exterior. In 1993, when Schneider's real estate empire collapsed because of massive fraud, Deutsche Bank took over as the main creditor for the Bernheimer Palace and allowed the completion of the renovations. The cost of reconstruction is estimated at well over DM 100 million, which included DM 32 million in unpaid manufacturers’ bills from Jürgen Schneider's bankruptcy. The reconstruction of the roof and spire has been identified as the main cause. It was not until 1999 that Deutsche Bank could resell the building to Robert Arnold, the heir and former partner of Arnold & Richter Cine Technik.
