= Colnaghi =

Colnaghi is a last name. Notable people with this last name include:

- Ignazio Colnaghi (1924–2017), Italian actor
- Luca Colnaghi (born 1999), Italian racing cyclist
- Martin Henry Colnaghi (1821–1908), British art dealer
- Mattia Colnaghi (born 2008), Italian racing driver

== See also ==
- P. & D. Colnaghi & Co., an art dealership in England
