= Lehmann Bernheimer =

German antique dealer (1841–1918)

- Born: 27 December 1841; Buttenhausen near Münsingen, Germany
- Died: 29 May 1918 (aged 76)
- Occupation: Art dealer
- Known for: Bernheimer-Haus
- Children: Otto Bernheimer
- Relatives: Konrad Bernheimer (great grandson)

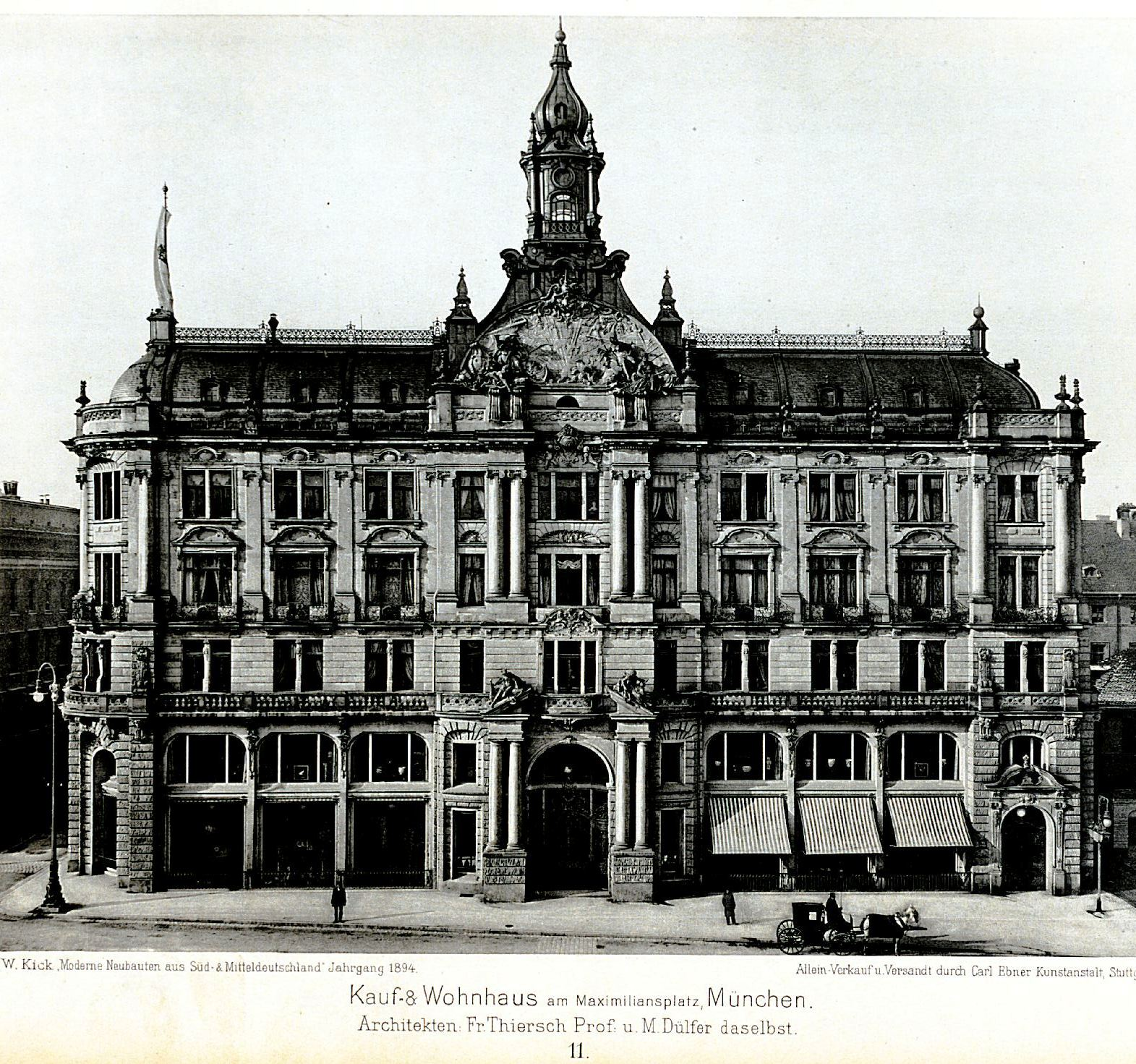
Bernheimer-Haus (before 1895)

Lehmann Bernheimer (27 December 1841 – 29 May 1918) was a German antique dealer, who built the Bernheimer-Haus in Munich.

He was born on 27 December 1841 in Buttenhausen near Münsingen, the third child of Meier Bernheimer (1801–1870) and his wife Sarah, née Kahn (1803–1881).

In 1887, Bernheimer bought a small coffee house and beer garden, owned and run by an Englishman, and called the English Café. In its place was built the Bernheimer-Haus, which was opened in December 1889 by Prince Regent Luitpold. Initially, the focus was on high-quality textiles, with the manufacture of luxury goods being slowly added. After a fire in 1897, the building was extended and antiques, tapestries and carpets were added. On his death in 1918, his son Otto Bernheimer took over.
