= Augusta Treverorum =

Ancient Roman city in Germany

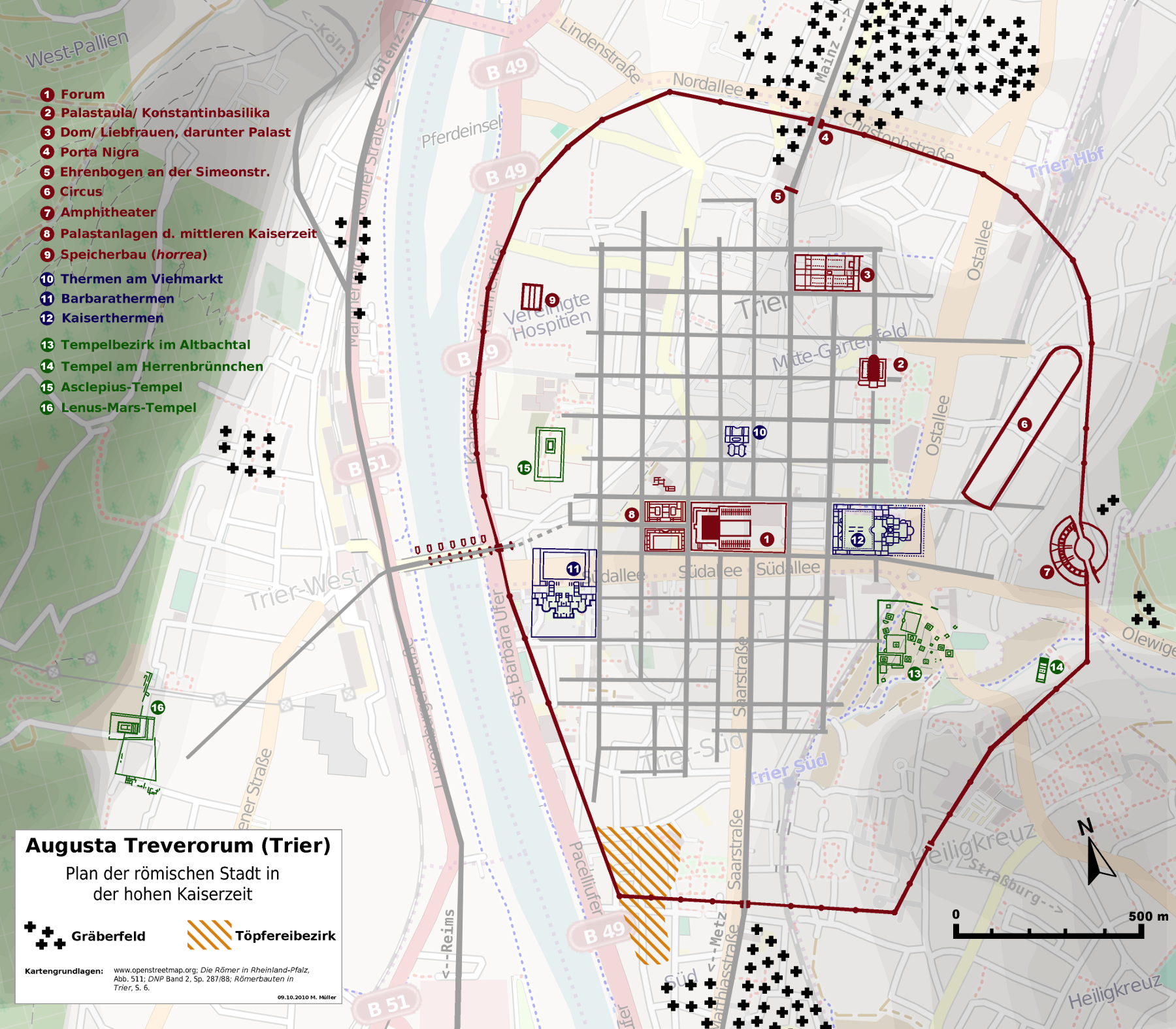
City map of Trier in the Roman Imperial period

Augusta Treverorum (Latin for "City of Augustus in the Land of the Treveri") was a Roman city on the Moselle River, from which modern Trier emerged.

The date of the city's founding is placed between the construction of the first Roman bridge in Trier (18/17 BC) and the late reign of Augustus († 14 AD). In the Roman Empire, Trier formed the main town of the civitas of the Treverians, where several tens of thousands of people lived, and belonged to the province of Gallia Belgica. Roman Trier gained particular importance in late antiquity: between the late 3rd and late 4th centuries several rulers, including Constantine the Great, used the city as one of the western imperial residences, sponsoring monumental buildings such as the Trier Imperial Baths and the Basilica of Constantine. With a high five-digit population in 300, Augusta Treverorum, now sometimes called Treveris, was the largest city north of the Alps and thus had the status of a global city.

The Roman buildings, which have survived to the present day, were designated as UNESCO World Heritage Roman Monuments, Cathedral and Church of Our Lady in Trier in 1986.

== Location ==
The two most famous landmarks of Roman Trier: the Porta Nigra ...

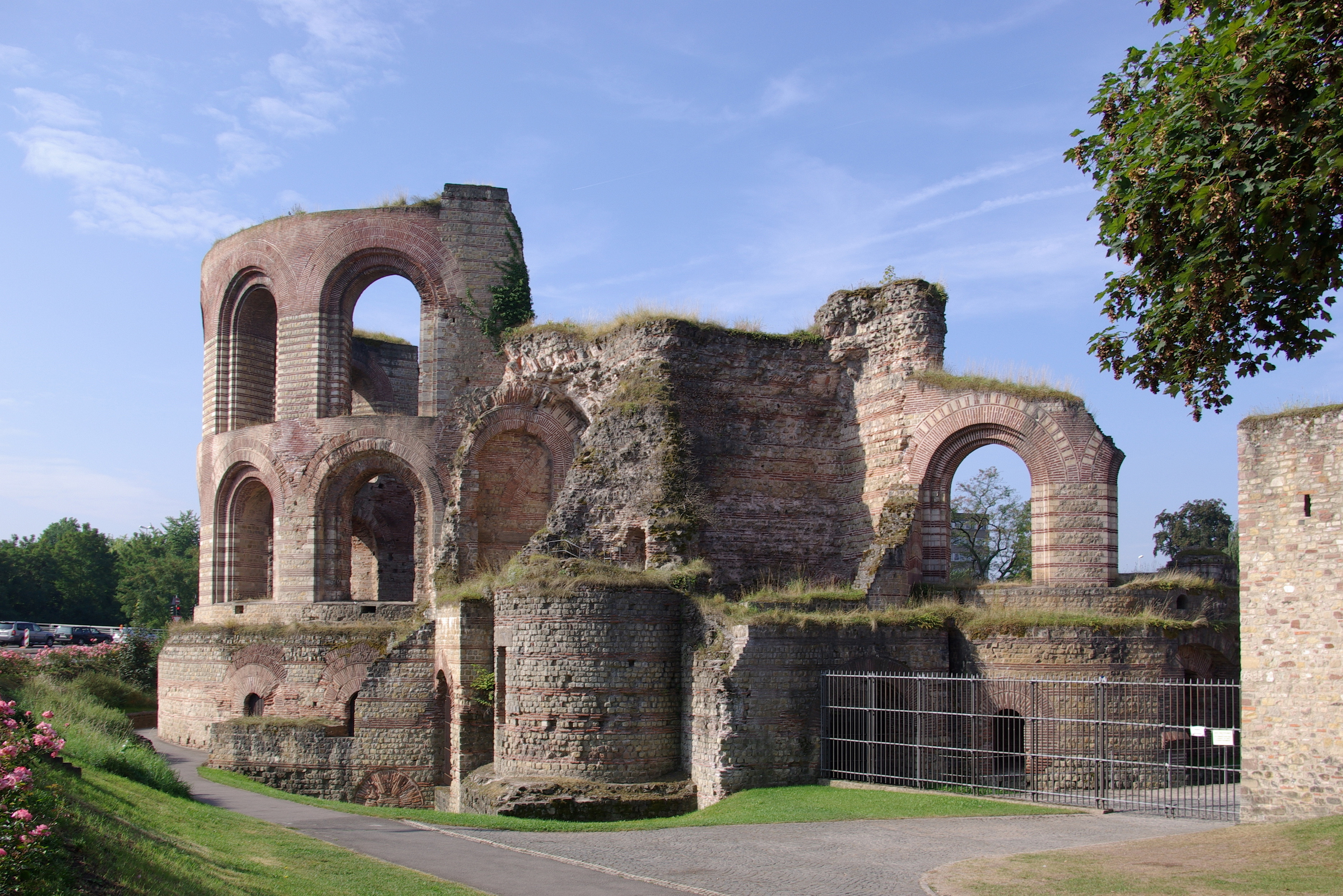
... and the Imperial Baths

Unlike almost all other Roman cities in today's Germany, Augusta Treverorum did not belong to one of the two Germanic provinces, but to Gaul. The city is located in a wide bend of the Moselle River, where a wide, flood-free valley plain lies between the river and the surrounding heights of the Hunsrück. Between the confluence of the Saar and the entrance to the entrenched meanders of the Middle and Lower Moselle, the Trier valley width between Konz and Schweich is the largest settlement chamber in the region. The location of the river is not likely to have shifted significantly since the last ice age. The deeply incised stream courses of Olewiger Bach/Altbach, Aulbach and Aveler Bach provided both fresh water and easy access to the surrounding heights. Therefore, since the Paleolithic Age, the area was repeatedly visited by humans.

== History ==
=== Pre- and early Roman times ===
The earliest settlements on Trier city territory have been proven near the later Roman potteries on the banks of the Pacelli River. These are finds of the Linear Pottery Culture. Already in the pre-Roman Iron Age, the Trier valley may have been largely cleared and settled. Before the first verifiable Roman bridge over the Moselle was built in 17 B.C., there was probably already a ford at the site. In the late Latène period, settlement seems to have been scattered along the right bank of the Moselle. A concentration of settlement features could be found during an area excavation between the Moselle, St. Irminen, Ostallee and Gilbertstraße.

The important centers of this time are not assumed to be in such valley settlements. The Treverian tribe, which gave its name to Trier, is tangible in the region mainly through important hilltop settlements (oppida), among them the oppidum on the Titelberg in Luxembourg, the Castellberg near Wallendorf, the Hillfort of Otzenhausen or the oppidum on the Martberg. The Treverian tribe was the first to settle in the region.

However, the small settlement was reason enough for a Roman military station to be established above the Trier valley width on the Petrisberg a few years after the Roman conquest of Gaul under Gaius Iulius Caesar. Few finds, among them Arretinian terra sigillata as well as a dendrochronologically dated wooden fragment, point to the time around 30 B.C. A connection with Agrippa's road building measures is suspected, which are mostly attributed to his first governorship in Gaul in the years 39/38 B.C.

=== Foundation ===
The city was probably founded in 18/17 BC by Emperor Augustus, which is primarily indicated by the name, but which is documented only in later times. The honor of being called by its name was otherwise only given to Augusta Vindelicum (Augsburg) and Augusta Raurica (Augst) in northern Switzerland in today's German-speaking world. The exact date cannot be determined from the sources and can only be approximated. The following are considered to be fixed historical points:

- The reorganization of the Gallic provinces under Augustus, which began in 27 BC with a census and concluded in 12 BC with the foundation of the altar of Roma and Augustus (ara Romae et Augusti) at Lugdunum (Lyon). Within this period, the foundation of a central place of the Treverians could also be assumed.
- The second governorship of Agrippa in Gaul in 19 BC
- The stay of Augustus in Gaul 16–13 BC.

This period can be significantly limited by archaeological finds. In the first place, the foundation piles of the first Roman wooden bridge over the Moselle are to be mentioned here. They prove that in the context of the road construction measures of this time the bridge was built in the years 18/17 B.C. Fragments of a monumental inscription for the Augustus grandsons Lucius and Gaius Caesar, who died in the years 2 and 4 A.D., show that at the latest at the end of the reign of Augustus certain urban structures were present, since such an inscription is only conceivable at public places with the function of a central place. An evaluation of the early Roman finds from the city area has shown that a large-scale settlement cannot be expected before the late Augustan period (Haltern horizon). This coincides with the abandonment of the settlement on the Titelberg, so that here possibly a transfer of the administrative tribal center of the Treverians is present. Similar building programs can be traced throughout Gallia Belgica and neighboring regions on the Rhine and Danube in this period.

=== Early and high imperial period ===
Augustus' measures in the Gallic provinces included the tripartition of the former Gallia comata into the new provinces Gallia Aquitania, Gallia Lugdunensis and Gallia Belgica, with Trier becoming part of the latter with its capital at Durocortorum Remorum (Reims). Trier was the seat of the financial procurator responsible for Belgica and later for both Germanic provinces (procurator provinciae Belgicae et utriusque Germaniae).

While only uncertain information can be given about the settlement at the time of the foundation, the development into a planned colony city is well recognizable in the 1st century. The street network deviates in the northern and southern outskirts more strongly from the regular layout of the insulae, so that for the core area a square foundation city with the width of three insulae results. Near the river, a considerable backfilling was carried out towards the end of the 1st century in order to gain flood-free usable areas. Several pillars of the Moselle bridges were filled up in the process. Also at the western bridgehead of the pile-grate bridge was a triumph arch-like gateway.

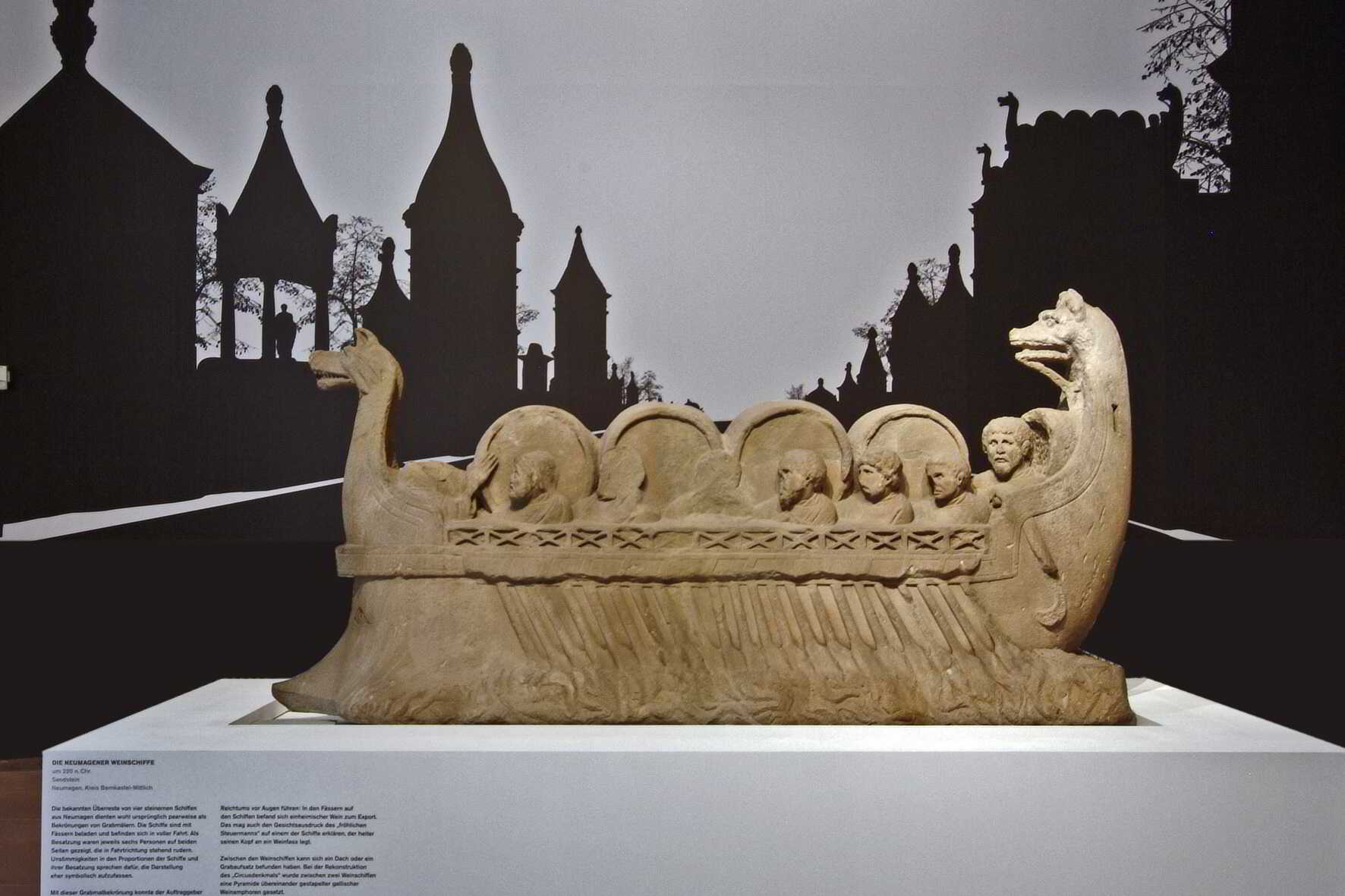
Neumagen wine ship in the Rhineland Regional Museum Trier

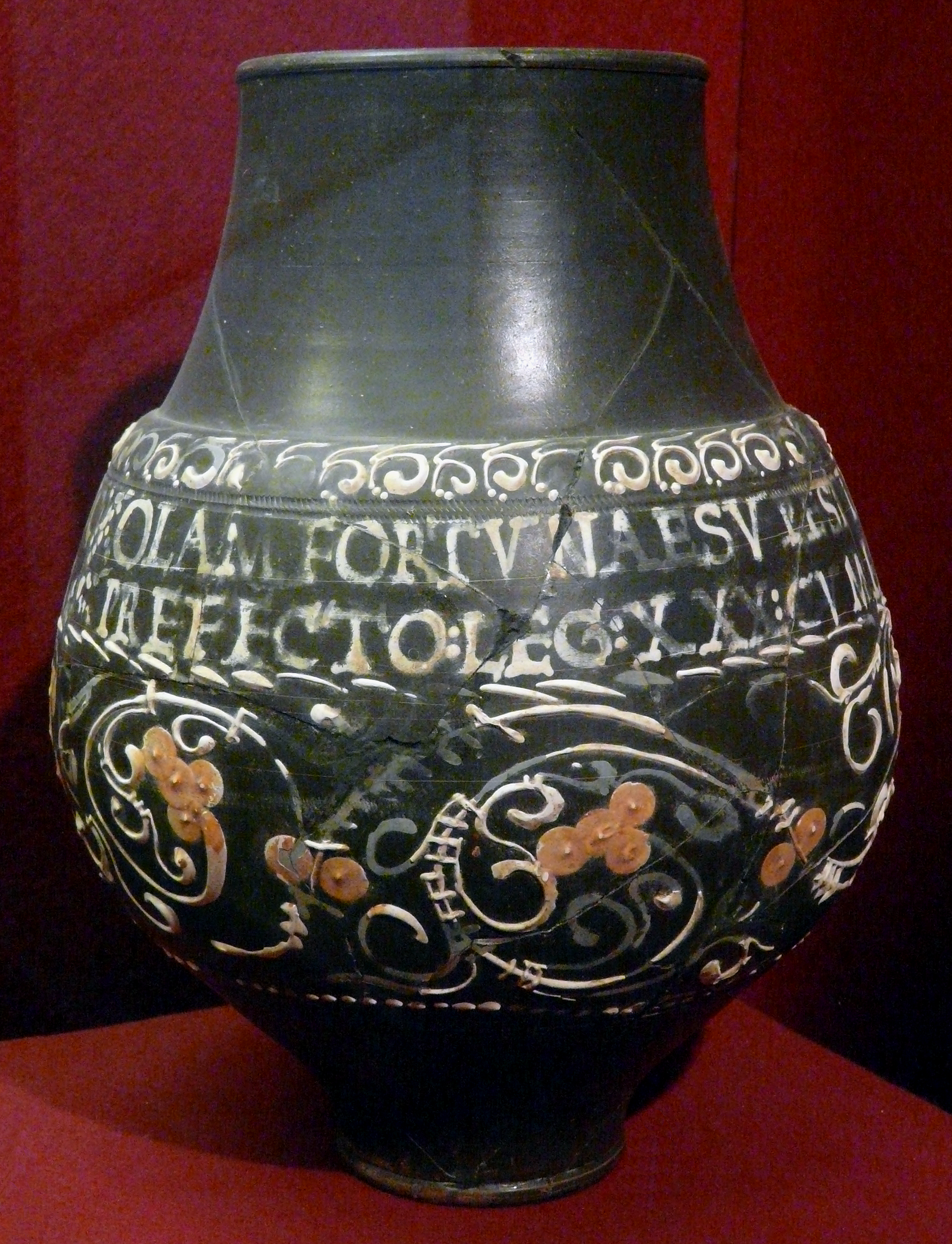
Trier saying cup, place of discovery Krefeld-Gellep (Gelduba)

The earliest mention of the stone bridge over the Moselle can be found in Tacitus' account of the Batavian Revolt of 69 A.D. Tacitus also mentions that Trier was a colony city (colonia Trevirorum). Presumably, similar to Cologne, the city had received this privileged status under Emperor Claudius. As terminus post quem can be seen a milestone from Buzenol from the year 43/44 A.D., which refers to Trier only as Aug(usta), not as colonia. However, unlike Cologne, the founding of the colony here was not connected with the settlement of legion veterans, i.e. Roman citizens. Therefore, there are basically two different views on the nature of the Trier colony status. One interpretation assumes a pure titular colony; unlike in the case of a regular colonia, the title colonia was not connected with a conferral of the civitas Romana to all free inhabitants. Opponents of this thesis have pointed out that there is no evidence for such honorary bestowals, and instead assume a bestowal of the latin rights. It is also unclear whether Tacitus used the designation in a legally precise manner or only as a general characterization.

The legal status of the city dwellers and the tribal community of the Treverians in the imperial period is thus not entirely certain. It is noticeable that, on the one hand, the designation as Treverians (Treveri or cives Treveri) continues to be used in inscriptions, which does not allow any conclusion on the civil right. On the other hand, mentions of the city (colonia) and the tribal community (civitas) suggest that both could have existed in parallel. Regardless of the legal status of the Treverians and their civitas, the city of Trier as their capital was an integral part of the Romanization. Already in the 40s of the first century, the geographer Pomponius Mela mentions Trier as a flourishing, rich city (urbs opulentissima). The value of this news is, however, controversial, since Mela still follows the tripartite division of Gaul from Caesar's Gallic War and does not mention important cities such as Lugdunum or Cologne.

However, the archaeological evidence testifies that in the 1st century the place took a rapid upswing. Numerous buildings were erected, such as the forum baths at the cattle market around 80 or the amphitheater around 100. In the middle of the second century the thermal baths at the cattle market had already become too small, so that one built over the surface of several Insulae the Barbara Baths. In their time they were considered one of the largest thermal baths in the Roman Empire. Under Marcus Aurelius and Commodus, the city fortifications were built from 170 and with them the north gate, the Porta Nigra, which underlines the importance of the city in the 2nd and 3rd centuries. Possibly, the construction measures are connected with the elevation of the city to the provincial capital of Gallia Belgica. The period when Trier replaced Reims in this function cannot be stated more precisely than before the middle of the 3rd century.

The basis of the city's rise was, in addition to its convenient location on the Moselle and the roads leading into the interior of Gaul, trade and commerce. Trier's terra sigillata manufactories, along with the potteries of Rheinzabern (Tabernae), attained a dominant position in the market in the late 2nd and 3rd centuries. The associated workshops were located mainly southeast of the city on the banks of the Pacelli. Also very popular in the northwestern provinces of the Roman Empire were the so-called Trier Spruchbecher, engobed cups inscribed with toasts. Occasional references to crafts and trades are preserved on stone monuments with which urban elites represented themselves. An indication of the trade is given by the Igel column, grave monument of the cloth merchant family Secundinius, on whose reliefs various activities of cloth production and trade are depicted. Already in Roman times, the cultivation and trade of wine may have played a not insignificant role, to which, among other things, the Neumagen wine ship refers.

In the civil war of the years 193 to 197 (Year of the Five Emperors) troops of Clodius Albinus besieged Trier, which was on the side of his rival Septimius Severus. The city was able to withstand the assault and was finally relieved by an army brought from Mainz, which the city later thanked in a preserved inscription. Both the discovery of a large Trier Gold Hoard from 196/197 and the fact that work on the Porta Nigra was apparently never fully completed are associated with this siege. It can be assumed, however, that the ultimately victorious Severus rewarded the city for its loyalty afterwards, as was customary in such cases. Due to its location in the hinterland, Trier was spared for a long time from the Germanic invasions during the so-called imperial crisis of the 3rd century, which led to the abandonment of the Upper Germanic-Raetian Limes (Limesfall). During this period, a Roman breakaway state - the Gallic Empire - controlled the region, and briefly moved the capital to Cologne; however, in the empire's latter years, and due to security concerns, the Gallic Emperor Tetricus moved the capital to Trier between 271 and 274. Since the city seems to have proven itself as an imperial residence and administrative center in the process, this measure pointed to the future. Soon after the death of Emperor Aurelian in 275, however, the city was initially sacked and partially destroyed by marauding Franks and Alamanni.

=== Late antiquity ===
Between 293 and 401, Trier was then one of the most important places in the west of the Roman Empire. As a result of the Diocletian reforms, the city became the seat of the praetorian prefect Galliarum and thus the administrative center of the diocesis Galliarum, which encompassed what is now Western Europe and parts of North Africa. The province of Belgica was divided and Trier became the capital of the Belgica prima thus created. During the Tetrarchy, first the Caesar Constantius I chose Trier as his residence in 293. Later, his son Constantine I, who stayed in the city for several years between 306 and 324, expanded it in a representative way. In order to consolidate his claim to power – which contradicted the actual rule of succession to the throne – in propaganda terms, Constantine had a monumental palace complex built (even by late antique standards) on the model of the Palatine in Rome. One of the ways in which he legitimized his rule was by deifying his father, who was buried in a mausoleum near the present-day church of St. Maximin. The construction of the Imperial Baths and the Palastaula, the largest known example of this type of building, also began during this period. On the banks of the Moselle near St. Irminen, a large double storage facility (horreum) from the 4th century was also discovered.

Attracted by the imperial court and the comitatenses stationed in the surrounding area, many people settled in the city, and the population probably multiplied. Exact figures cannot be determined due to a lack of knowledge about the built-up area within the city walls. For the middle imperial period it is assumed that there were about 20,000 inhabitants, of whom about 18,000 would have found room in the Trier amphitheater. The Circus, built in the 4th century, on the other hand, held at least 50,000, perhaps even 100,000 visitors, but in neither case can it be said whether consideration was given to the population of the surrounding countryside when these buildings were planned. More than 100,000 people will hardly have lived in Trier even in the 4th century; other considerations even assume that even in late antiquity a population of more than 30,000 could hardly have been supported in this area. With an estimated population of around 20,000, Augusta Treverorum would have had roughly the same population as ancient Cologne (Colonia Claudia Ara Agrippinensium). After the departure of the imperial court and the praetorian prefecture in the early 5th century, the city's population may have declined quite rapidly to perhaps 10,000 at last. This trend increased in the migration period and the Early Middle Ages. Around 1120 there were around 4,000 left, around 1430 the number increased again to around 10,000 inhabitants, still only half as many as in ancient times; during the same period, Cologne quadrupled its population to 40,000, twice as many as in Roman times. However, precisely because Cologne has grown significantly, many Roman buildings have disappeared under new development. We still don't know where the Cologne amphitheater was located (while the Trier one still exists).

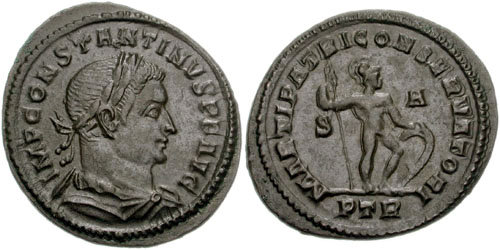
Follis of Constantine, Trier mint

Constantine's son Constantine II resided here from 328 until his death in 340, the usurper Decentius from 351 to 353. Treveris was again the residence of Roman emperors (Valentinian I, Gratian, Magnus Maximus) from 367 to 388; the young Valentinian II resided here again around 390. This period of prosperity was also reflected in the literature of the time. The imperial educators Lactantius (around 317) and Ausonius (367–388) worked in Trier; the latter set a literary monument to the landscape in his Mosella. Under Ausonius, the Trier College also achieved its greatest importance. It was one of the most important schools in the Western Empire, surpassed only by the school in Burdigala (Bordeaux). Although there are some written sources about it, an exact picture of the school cannot be gained. The most important son of the late antique city was Ambrosius of Milan.

The presence of administrative and military personnel, the court and the mint increased Trier's importance in the 4th century. Several palatial villa complexes attributed to the imperial house or high officials, such as the Palatiolum in Trier-Pfalzel, were built in the city's environs. The disadvantage of this development was a considerable forced economy to supply the city and the court; the withdrawal of the institutions around 400 left a gap that could not be closed. The proximity to the imperial residence meant a certain security in this period; in other parts of the Roman Empire, the villae rusticae, like the entire rural settlement, were severely threatened, so that only the fortified towns offered protection to the provincial Roman population.

Probably around 402, a few years after the transfer of the court to Mediolanum and the death of Theodosius I (395), the Gallic praetorian prefecture was also transferred from Trier to Arles (418 at the latest). With the departure of these important economic factors began the final decline of the once important Roman city. All that remained was the episcopal administration, with which Christianity became the bearer of the continuity of Roman culture, supported by the Gallo-Roman upper class, which continued to be influential. After repeated destruction and plundering, the city finally fell to the Franks around 480. Roman rule in northern Gaul existed only nominally at this time: while the Romanized Frank Arbogast had ruled in the area of Trier until then, the Roman rump state Kingdom of Soissons established by Aegidius in northern Gaul after 461 continued under his son Syagrius until 486/487.

==== Trier as a bishop's see ====
The earliest fixed point for a bishop's see in Trier is the year 314, when Bishop Agritius took part in the Synod of Arles. Trier is thus the oldest documented bishop's see on German soil. It is possible that Agritius already had several predecessors, which, however, have only been handed down in little credible medieval sources. The large buildings of the Trier Cathedral and the Church of Our Lady as well as the large suburban churches of St. Maximin, St. Paulin and St. Matthias still bear witness to the late antique bishop's seat. They received their names from other early Trier bishops, around whose burial grounds large early Christian cemeteries developed.

Through contemporary written sources, Trier bishops like Agritius are mentioned in the great ecclesiastical-political conflicts of the 4th century. Due to their position near the emperor's residence, they had a special importance. Accordingly, connections of prominent churchmen of this time such as Athanasius, Ambrosius and Martin of Tours to the bishop's seat of Trier on various occasions are documented. Jerome stayed in Trier for studies around 370.

==== Imperial mint ====
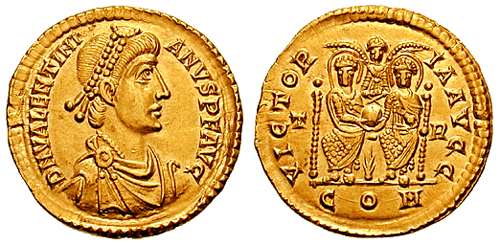
Solidus of Valentinian II, Trier Mint

According to the finding of several inscriptions it could be assumed that already the Gallic usurpers had coins struck in Trier. However, the attribution of Gallic coinage to Trier is problematic; the minting of imperial coins at the Trier mint is only certain from 293/294, under Caesar Constantius I. The Trier mint was one of the most important mints of the Late Antique Empire. During almost 150 years, 39 emperors, usurpers, empresses and emperor's sons were minted on coins in Trier, including all emperors ruling in the western part except Jovian. Known are more than 520 gold, 310 silver and 1250 bronze coins with different obverse and reverse. Trier mintages were mostly marked by the letter group TR.

The latest mintings of the Trier imperial mint are from the usurper Eugenius (392–394). It is disputed whether minting still took place under Honorius (395–423), since calibration weights with the name of the emperor have been found, but so far no corresponding coins are known. The coins of the Trier imperial mint were minted by the usurper Eugenius (392–394).

=== Franconian time ===
The frequent warlike events and changing power relations associated with the collapse of Roman rule permanently changed the settlement pattern in the 5th century. Backfills of the underground service facilities in the Imperial and Barbara Baths prove that operations were abandoned in the first half of the century. The Ruwer water conduit could also no longer be maintained and was abandoned. At first, only small parts of the previous urban residential quarters were used. Large parts of the moat in front of the northeastern city wall were filled in because it was no longer defensible due to its size. The large buildings of the former imperial residence probably served as a refuge for the population.

From the middle of the 5th century on, the finds are extremely sparse and are mostly limited to church buildings such as the double church complex Dom/Liebfrauen and the church of St. Maximin, where a gapless sequence from the late antique coemeterial building to the early medieval church can be proven. Furthermore, the cemeteries south and north of the city were used, whereby the name material of the early Christian inscriptions shows a high Romanesque population.

Finds from the older Merovingian period are rare in the urban area. In the Altbachtal a small hamlet can be proved since the 7th century, which is partly built on the ancient ruins. While the finds of the 6th century were limited to isolated finds and the area of the veneration of saints and relics around the suburban churches, an increase in population can be expected since the younger Merovingian period. In the city center, the Roman street network remained partially in place until the market was established at the Domburg in the Middle Ages.

== City plan ==
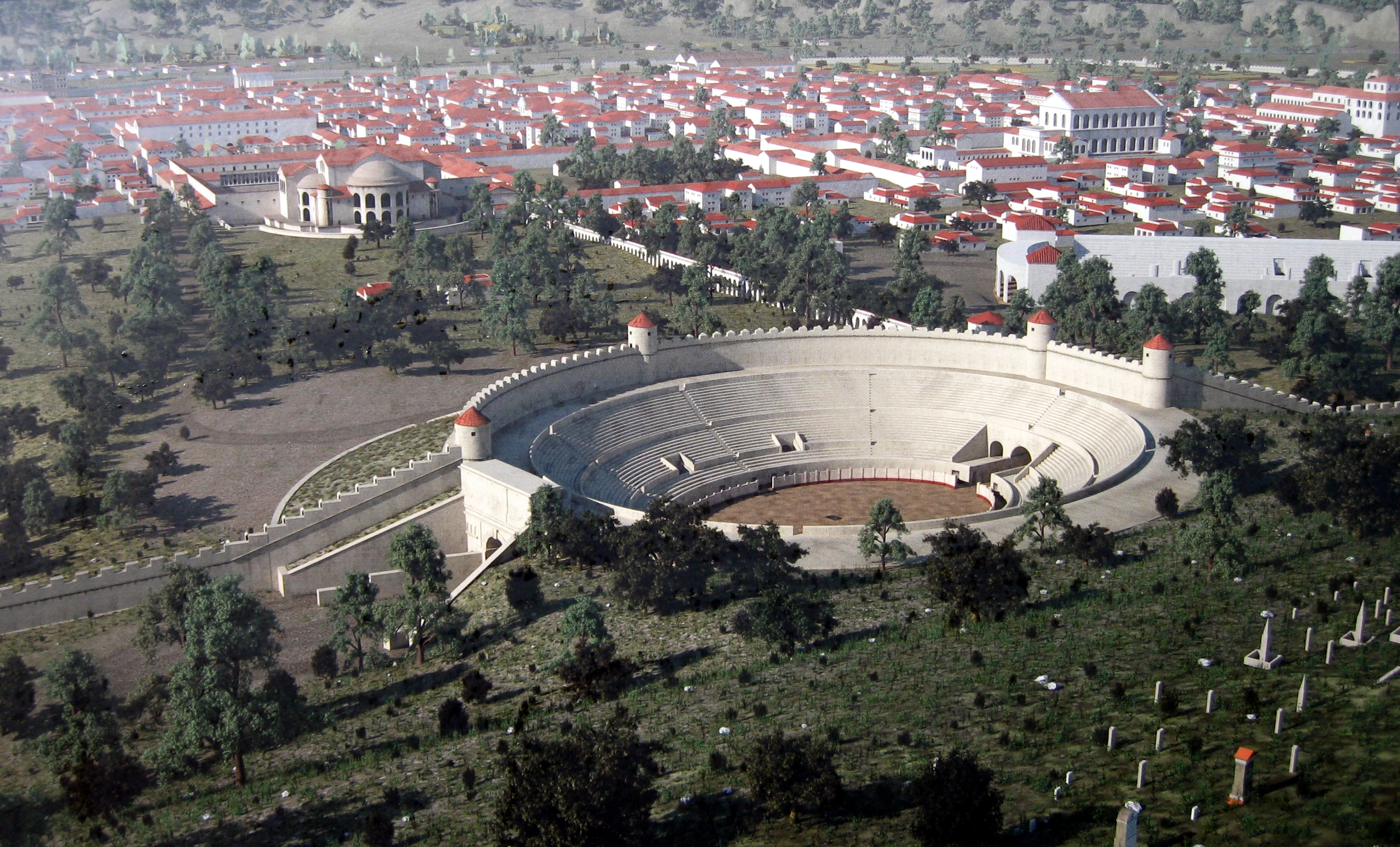
View of the late antique city from the southeast

Due to the natural location, the shape of the Roman city was largely predetermined. The decumanus maximus was oriented to the connection from the Moselle bridge to the Olewiger valley. However, it was cut through around 100 by the construction of the forum, with through traffic having to switch to the northern and southern parallel roads. This probably also explains the relocation of the Moselle bridge during the new construction of the stone pier bridge by 25 m upstream compared to the former pile grate bridge as well as the smaller cut of the insulae along the Decumanus. A grid of streets laid out at right angles resulted in insulae between 70 and 100 meters wide and a length of mostly 100 meters. In the core area the layout was more regular, while with the growth of the city in the 1st and 2nd century in the outskirts the layout varied and occasionally several insulae were combined into one long rectangular one. Also, the streets in the core area had up to 17 artificial elevations, while in the outer districts only one to four such elevations are attested. In the more representative settlement areas, they were covered with limestone slabs or polygonal basalt slabs in the 4th century.

In the outskirts of the city, mainly to the south and close to the Moselle, there were artisanal businesses. They depended on the proximity to the waterway for the transport of goods. In addition to the aforementioned potteries, these included textile manufactories, metalworking plants, and production facilities for glassware. It is difficult to fit the temple district in the Altbach valley into the regular settlement grid. The location of the area, which was used continuously from the 1st to the 4th century, was determined by the stream courses, springs and associated valley incisions there.

The residential buildings of the city initially consisted of half-timbered buildings. The earliest stone buildings were found in the area of the later Imperial Baths. After several phases of reconstruction and partly splendid decoration with mosaics and wall paintings, they were demolished after 293 AD for the construction of the baths. The succession of finishing phases, first in timber-framed construction, from the late 1st century limestone and finally red sandstone, can be observed on many private buildings, including a residential complex uncovered near St. Irminen in 1976/1977. This also included a small bath complex, which had the typical room division of Roman baths into cold bath (frigidarium), leaf bath (tepidarium) and hot bath (caldarium). In the course of time, the houses received luxurious furnishings with wall paintings, mosaics, opus signinum or ornamented tile floors. Tiles or slate were used for roofing.

=== Forum ===
The city's forum was located at the intersection of decumanus maximus and cardo maximus. Only a few statements can be made about the early period of the complex. In Vespasian times it was greatly expanded so that it occupied six quarter areas on either side of the west–east axis of the city, measuring 140 × 278 meters. During the expansion, some private residential quarters were leveled as well as the neighboring forum baths at the cattle market were added to the complex. At the western end of the forum was a basilica (100 × 25 m), which occupied the entire width of the square. East of it, on both sides of a long rectangular square along the main street, were porticoes with underground cryptoporticos and stores.

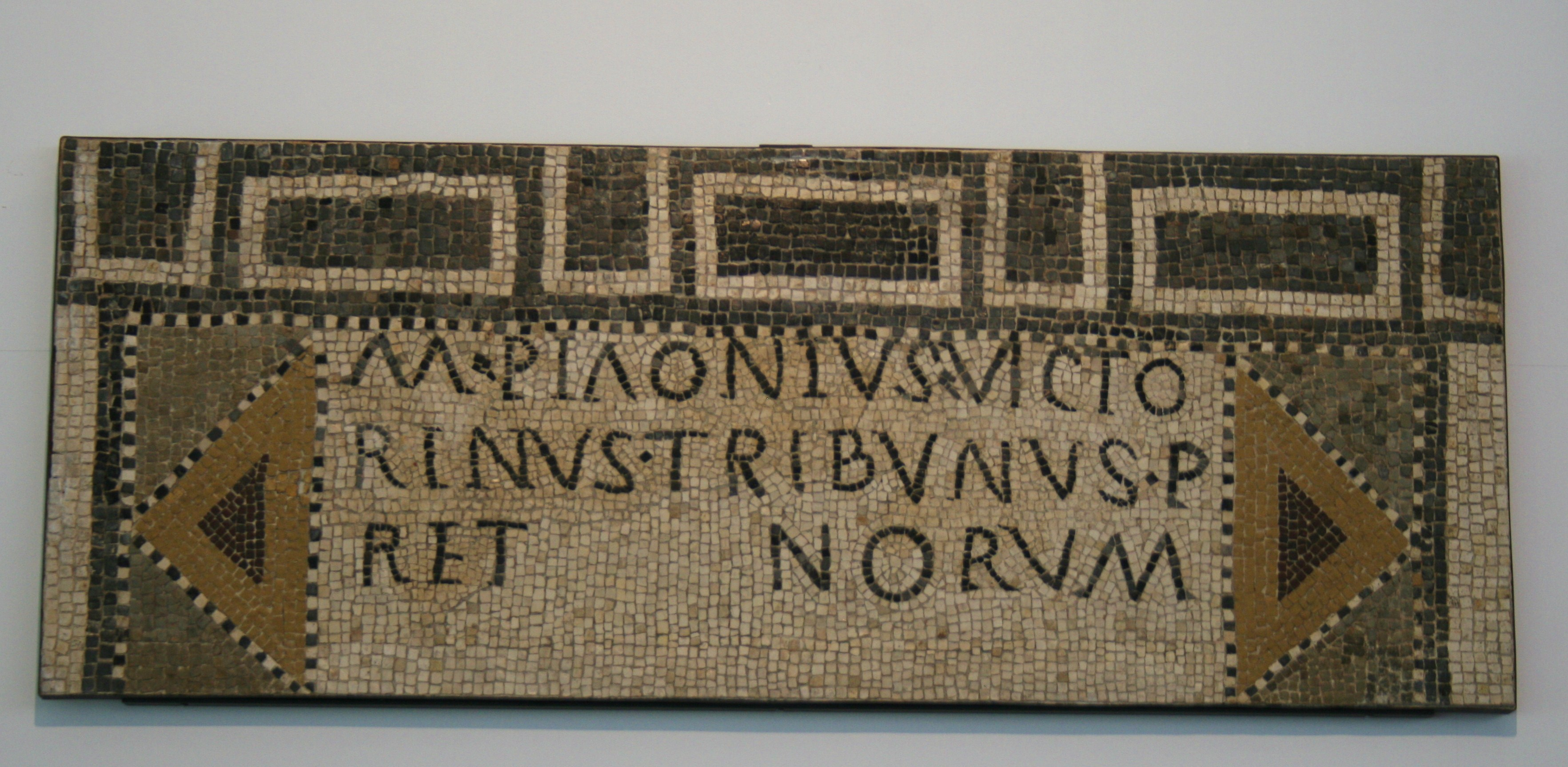
Victorinus mosaic with inscription

On both insulae west of the forum, early residential development of the 1st century was first identified. It was replaced in the northern insulae (under the present city theater) in the 3rd century by a distinguished town house. It had a large inner courtyard with portico (peristyle house) and a rich decoration with marble paneling, wall paintings and mosaics. The inscription on one of these mosaics identifies it as the residence of the Praetorian tribune Victorinus, later emperor of the Gallic Roman Empire. Mighty wall courses on the two southern insulae can be added to symmetrically adjoining buildings in this phase, so that public buildings are presumed to have been built here.

=== City fortification ===
Already the city of the 1st century A.D. had archways at the borders of the civil buildings, which, however, did not have a fortificatory character, but were designed as triumphal or honorary arches. Foundations of such buildings could be proved archaeologically at the city-side bridgehead of the Moselle bridge, between Simeon- and Moselle-street as well as a blocked rest in an arch of the imperial thermae. They probably formed the conclusion of the founding city of the 1st century even before the construction of the Circus and the amphitheater.

The 6418 m long Roman city wall then enclosed an area of 285 ha. In the past, it was often assumed that it was not built until the 3rd century, when civil wars and marauding Germanic tribes threatened the cities of Gaul. Today, however, there is a consensus that the city wall was already built in the last quarter of the 2nd century. This dating results, among other things, from the fact that it cuts through parts of the burial ground there in the north at the Porta Nigra. The latest burials within the walls date to the third quarter of the 2nd century. (The Romans generally buried their dead outside the city walls, so the graves must be older than the wall). Small finds in the wall area point to the late 2nd century. To the south, the wall cuts through the pottery district, which, however, continued to produce on both sides of the wall in the 3rd century. Markings on the stones of the Porta Nigra also refer to Emperor Marcus Aurelius (161–180) and his son Commodus (180–192). The complex appears to have been ready for defense when Clodius Albinus' troops attacked the city in 195 to no avail.

The wall was built as a typical Roman cast masonry. The core consisted of slate, small stones and abundant mortar, while sandstone or limestone ashlars were faced on the outside. The height of the walkway can be reconstructed to 6.2 m based on the preserved wall exits at the Porta Nigra. The width was up to 4 meters in the foundation area, reduced to up to 3 meters at the end. Round towers were regularly inserted, mostly at the ends of the street alignments. The total of 48 or 50 towers of the Trier city wall still protruded evenly from the wall on both sides. Later Roman fortifications, on the other hand, usually had towers projecting far outward, which allowed the lateral areas of the wall to be better protected and attackers to be caught in the crossfire. The shape of the towers also indicates that they were built in the late 2nd century.

Modern research mostly assumes that Trier's city wall – similar to those of many other Roman cities in the predominantly peaceful 1st and 2nd centuries – was not built to respond to a concrete threat; it was less a military installation than a prestige project intended to underline the importance of the site.

Of the wall, only in the north and along the Moselle are smaller sections preserved, which were integrated into the later medieval city wall (Schießgraben, at the vocational school; cellar of the house at Schützenstraße 20, visible from the outside). In the southern sections it was excavated down to the foundations. On Langstraße, a part is accessible along the length of 70 m.

The city wall had a total of five gate buildings, some of which, like the Porta Nigra, were very elaborately designed and at the time of their construction already anticipated the later widespread type of fortified gateaway. The southern gate (Porta Media) opposite the Porta Nigra was already demolished in the Middle Ages, which is why only foundations are known of it. The western gate at the Moselle bridge continued to be used in the Middle Ages and was called Porta Inclyta ("famous gate") at that time. From the east, the city was entered through a gate south of the amphitheater, which was used as a secondary entrance. In the late 4th century another southeast gate was added, which since the Middle Ages was called Porta Alba.

At the time of its construction, the spacious fortification was still designed for growth, as many open spaces in the peripheral areas show. In military terms, however, the wall was of little use. The structure hardly had to prove itself in the first 200 years of its existence – the only known exceptions are the attack of 195 and the Frankish-Alamanni attack around 275, and in the latter the wall could not stop the attackers. Then, in the 5th century, it was hardly possible to effectively defend the city with the complex designed more for representation than for defensive value. Before the attack of the Vandals as a result of the Crossing of the Rhine, the remaining population of the city, which had been cleared of court and administration, could only protect itself by entrenching itself in the amphitheater.

==== Porta Nigra ====
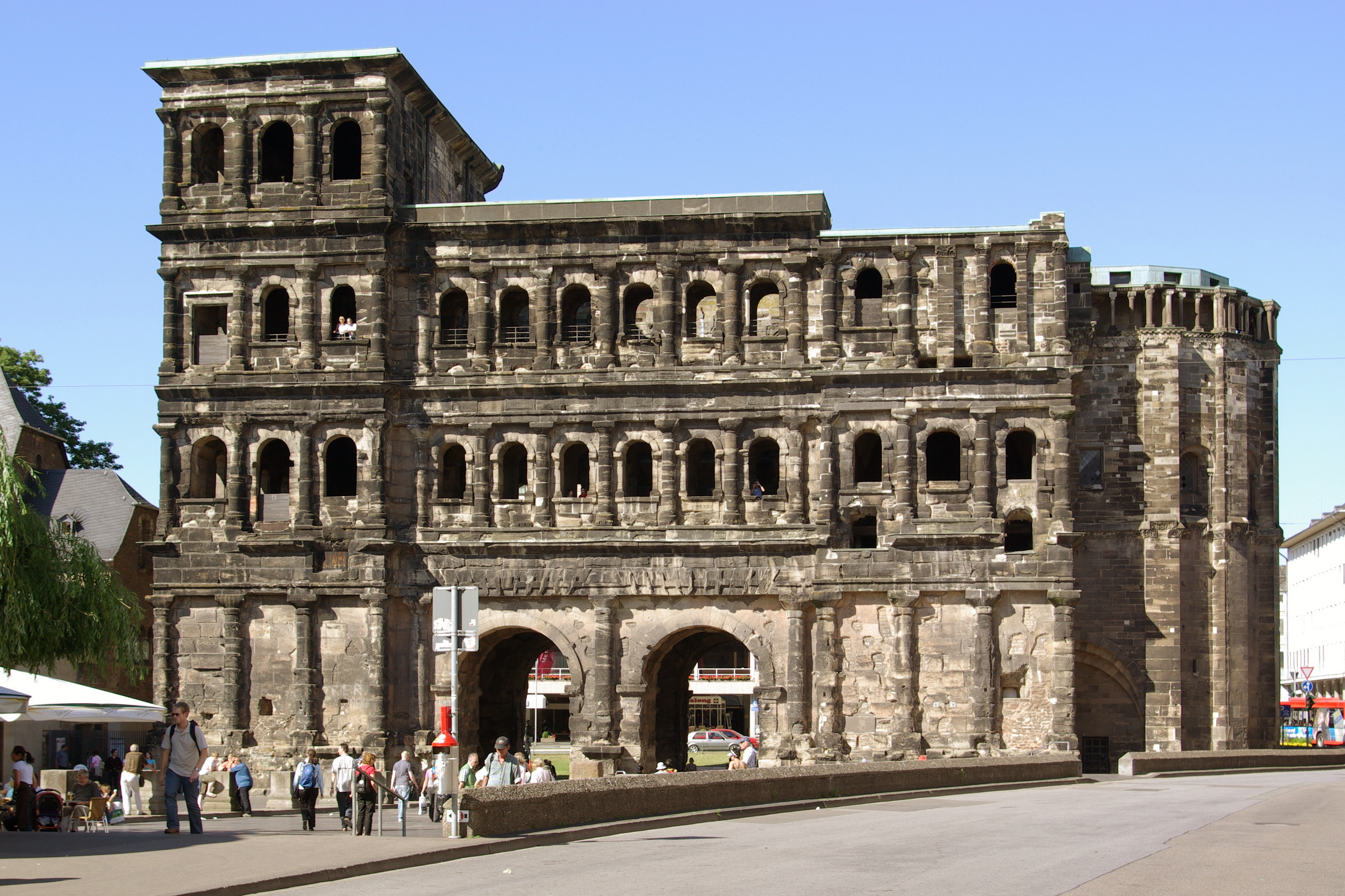
Porta Nigra, city side

The Porta Nigra is the only surviving gate of Trier's Roman city wall and, along with the Imperial Baths, probably the most famous monument. Like the city wall, it originally dates from the last quarter of the 2nd century AD; the start of construction could be dated to the year 170 by dendrochronology in 2018. It owes its preservation to the fact that in the Middle Ages Simeon of Trier settled in the building as a hermit, and the northern gate of the Roman city was subsequently converted into a church. By Napoleon's order it was freed from later additions since 1804.

==== Porta media ====
The Porta Media as the southern city gate and counterpart to the Porta Nigra was located at the end of today's Saarstraße. Only the remains of the foundations of this city gate have been found.

==== Porta Alba ====
The Porta Alba was added in the 4th century as a southeast gate and was located on the road to Strasbourg (Argentoratum). It was narrower than the older city gates and had only a simple gateway. Its name comes from the Middle Ages, when it was variously used as a protective castle.

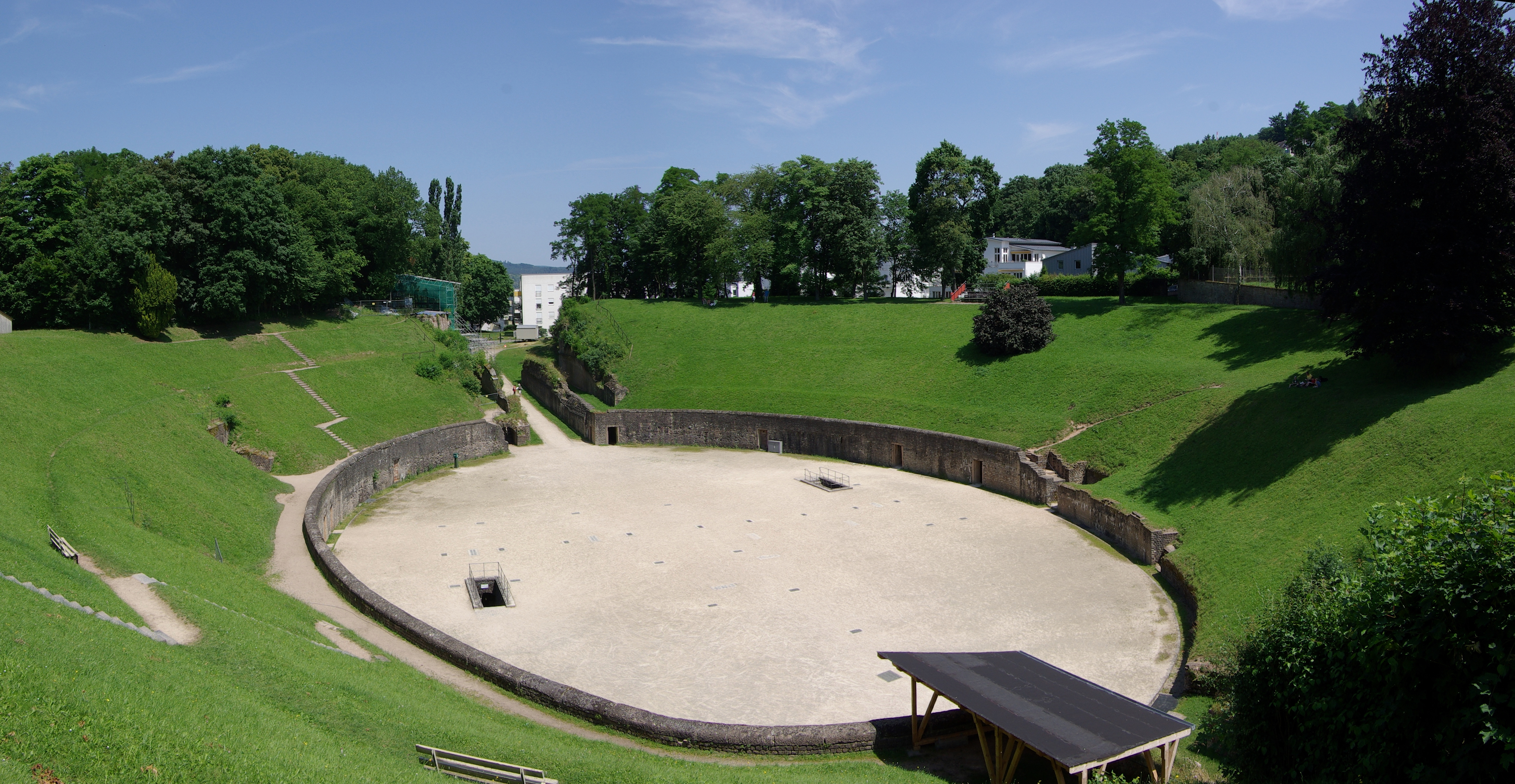
Amphitheater

=== Amphitheater ===
The amphitheater at the foot of the Petrisberg was built around 100 AD, possibly already having a smaller, wooden predecessor. The spectator tiers (cavea) were sunk into the hillside, and the resulting spoil was used to fill in the tiers on the valley side. Of the complex, which could seat up to 18,000 people, essentially the oval arena (70.5 × 49 m) with its boundaries and some underground vaults (vomitoria) have been preserved.

When the city wall was built, the amphitheater was integrated into it and served as the eastern access road. In the Middle Ages, the amphitheater fell into disrepair, was used as a quarry, and the arena was gradually flooded. Since the excavations at the beginning of the 20th century it can be used again for events. In the find material, which is kept in the Rhenish State Museum in Trier, a group of curse tablets, which were deposited here in antiquity, is particularly interesting, in addition to stone monuments. The rest of the find material dates mainly from the 4th century, which is probably related to the long period of use. Bloody games in the arena are documented as late as the time of Constantine.

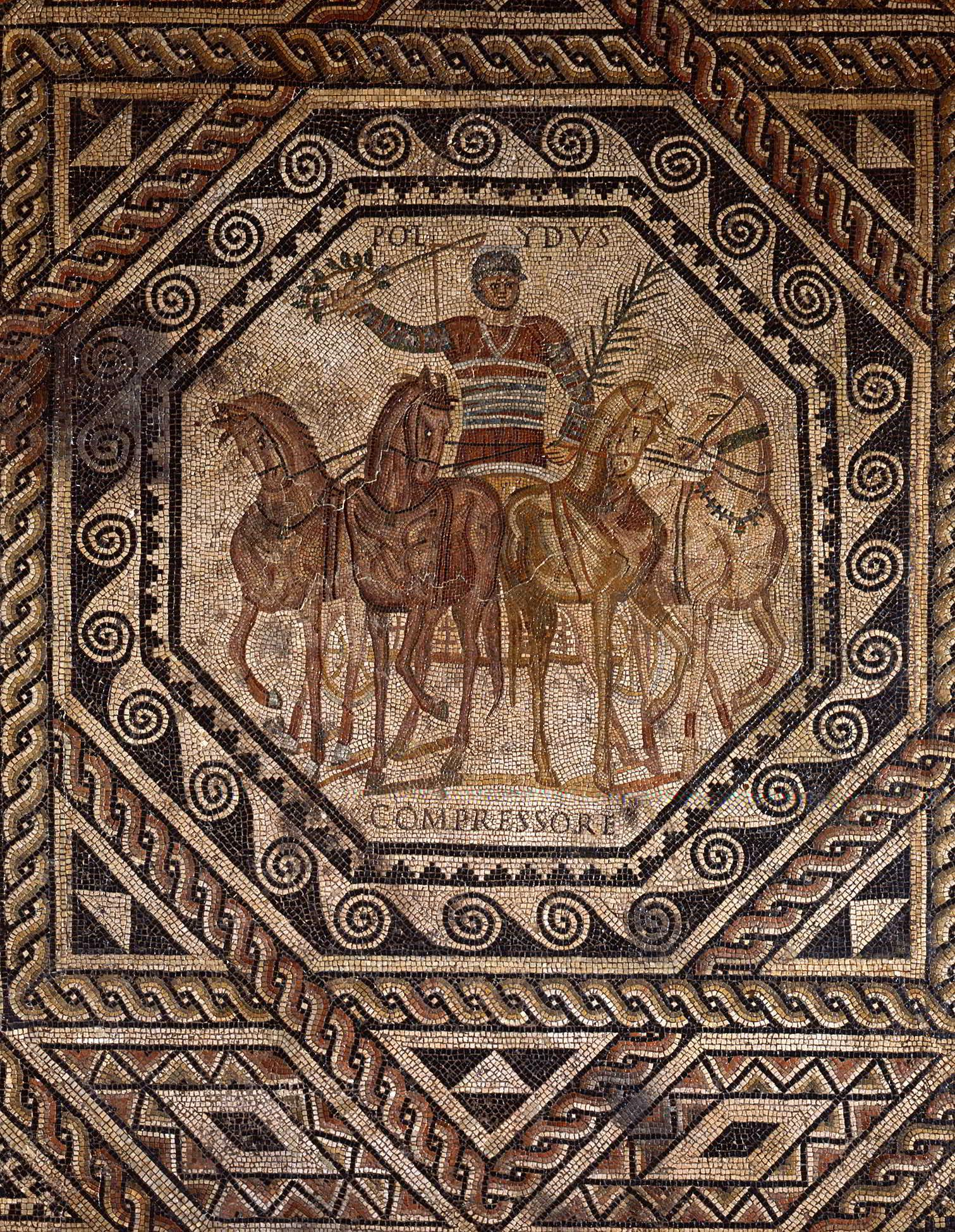
Polydus mosaic in RLM Trier

=== Circus ===
The Roman Circus of Trier has not been preserved and can only be guessed from the course of some streets below the amphitheater and Petrisberg. Its location is indicated by the clear intersection in the course of Egbert- and Helenenstraße, while the northern rounding may have been located at today's Agritiusstraße. This would result in a complex with a length of about 500 meters.

Chariot racing played an important role in the self-portrayal of the Roman emperors, especially in late antiquity, and enjoyed great popularity. Numerous pictorial representations point to the Trier Circus. First and foremost is the Polydus mosaic, which shows a charioteer with his team. A similar depiction exists on a contorniate found in Trier, and there is also a relief with a horse driver in the Neumagen funerary monuments. Since the Treverians are described in the written sources as good horsemen, it is assumed that soon after the amphitheater was built in the 2nd century, a horse racing track was also erected. At the latest, however, when the place became the emperor's residence, there must have been a circus.

Due to its location, the Circus was destroyed faster than other large Roman buildings in the early Middle Ages, the stones were reused and the area was used for agriculture. In the 19th century, the area south of Trier's main train station was developed with a residential area, and the probably very small remains of the site were not investigated.

=== Thermal baths ===
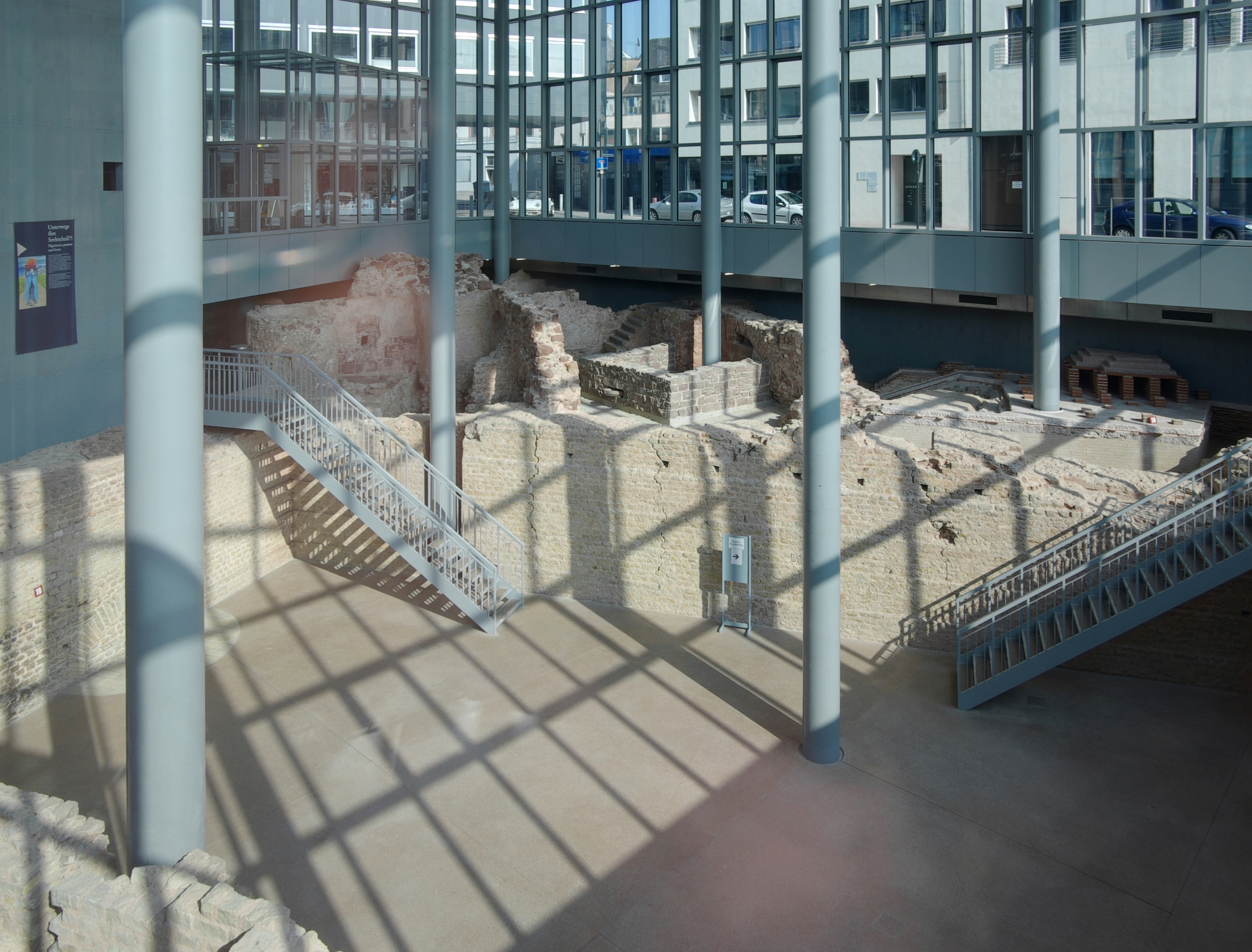
View into the reconstructed parts of the thermal complex at the Viehmarkt

==== Thermal baths at the cattle market ====
The baths at the Viehmarkt are the oldest public thermal baths of Augusta Treverorum. They occupied a complete insula north of the Roman forum in the central area of the settlement. The baths were built in place of an older residential development around the year 80. Coin and pottery finds make a use with several alterations until the 4th century probable. Whether the site is really a pure thermal complex is disputed. Remarkable is the fact that the necessary heating facilities were added only in a second construction phase, according to other information even in the 4th century.

The rooms visible today were overformed since 1615 by the construction of a Capuchin monastery. The cattle market was created only after the dissolution of the monastery from 1812. Due to smaller channel excavations and observations in the post-war period, a larger palace-like building had been expected here. During excavation work for the construction of an underground car park and the main building of the municipal savings bank, the thermal baths were discovered from October 1987. Parts of the complex are accessible today together with an exposed road in a glass protective structure designed by architect Oswald Mathias Ungers under the Viehmarkt.

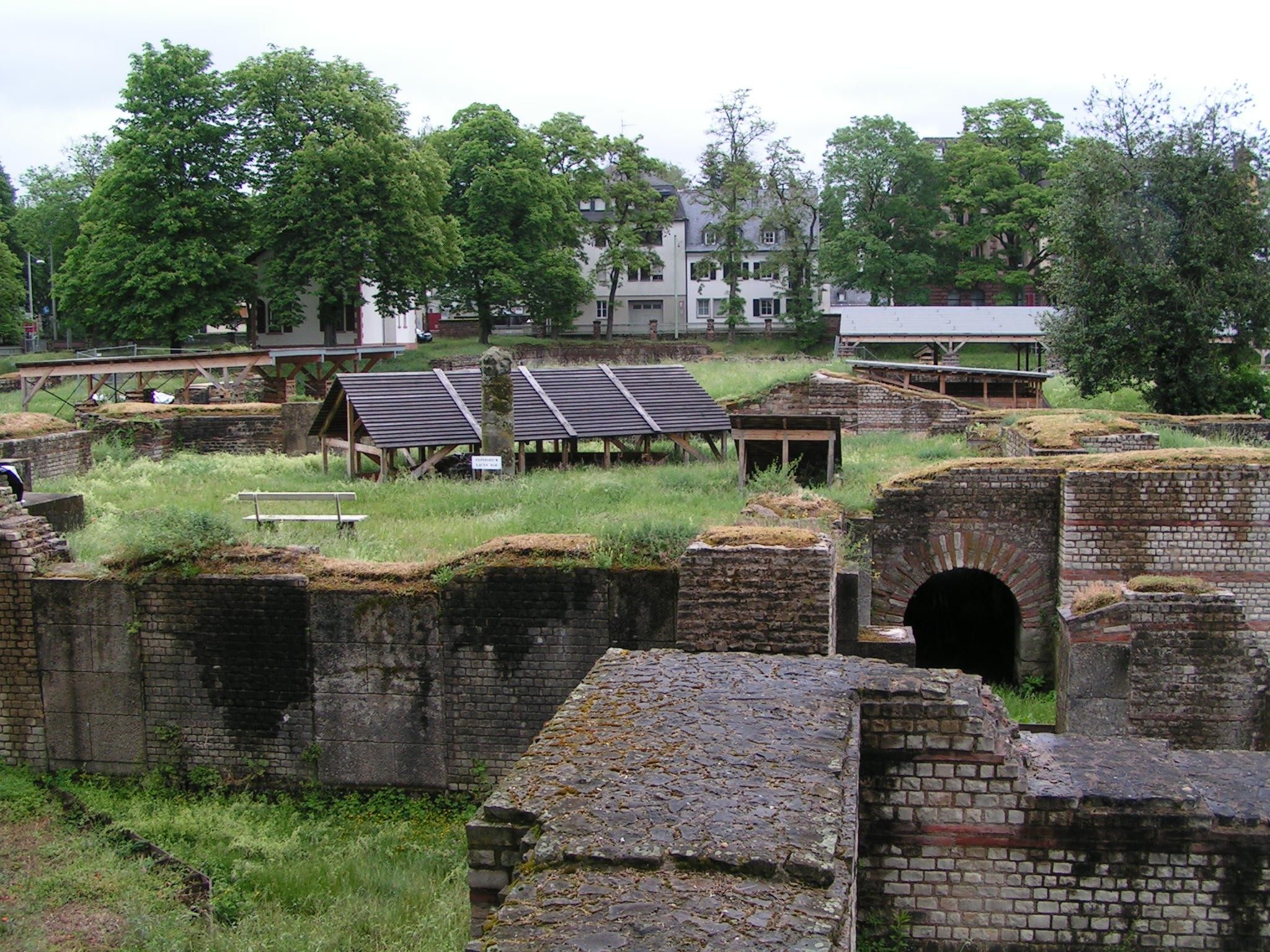
Barbara Baths, state 2007

==== Barbara Baths ====
Already around the middle of the 2nd century, the baths at the Viehmarkt had become too small for the growing city population. To the south of the decumanus maximus, the Baths of Barbara were built near the Moselle River. With an area of 172 m × 240 m (42,500 m^{2}), they occupied more than two insulae and were among the largest thermal baths of their time. They were surpassed only by the Baths of Trajan in Rome and the later thermal baths of the 3rd and 4th centuries.

The findings suggest that they were used even after the first Germanic invasions until the end of the 4th century. In the Middle Ages, the suburb of St. Barbara developed in the partially upright ruins, as well as probably the noble residence of the De Ponte family. It was only in modern times that the last upright remains were demolished. The exposed foundation walls were temporarily inaccessible due to redevelopment, but since 2015 the complex has been open to visitors again.

=== Temple ===
==== Temple district Altbachtal ====
In the valley hollow of the Altbach below the amphitheater, images of gods and terracottas have been frequently found since the 19th century. The Notgemeinschaft der deutschen Wissenschaft had excavations carried out here by Siegfried Loeschcke in 1926–1934, which yielded astonishing results under layers of alluvium up to 5 m thick. Over 70 temples, chapels, sacred precincts and priests' houses as well as a cult theater were uncovered on an area of 5 ha. The finds now in the Rheinisches Landesmuseum represent the largest collection of cult monuments from a closed district in the Roman world.

==== Temple at the Herrenbrünnchen ====
After the discovery of several architectural parts of the 1st century above the temple district in the Altbachtal, an excavation was carried out by the Rheinisches Landesmuseum on the grounds of the Charlottenau estate in 1909/1910. The remains of a monumental podium temple with a columned vestibule (pronaos), flight of steps, and altar podium were uncovered on an area of 65 × 23 m. The building had walls up to 4.1 m thick. Architectural elements found allow to reconstruct a temple front with six 15 m high columns supporting architrave and pediment. Several elaborately designed capitals in the Trier Cathedral, which were installed to replace granite columns that had been broken after a fire in the 5th century, may have come as spolia from the temple at the Herrenbrünnchen.

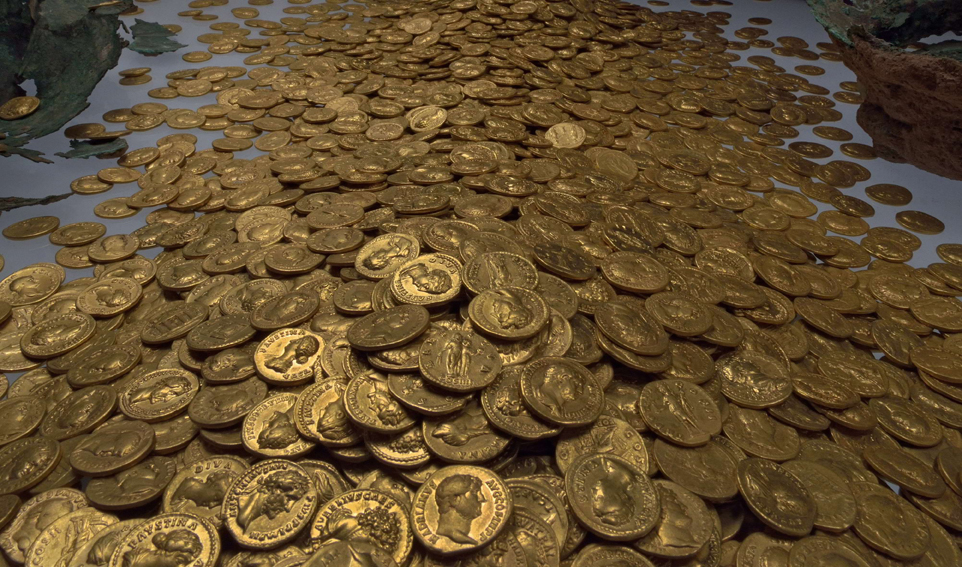
Trier gold hoard from the Feldstraße in the Rhineland Regional Museum

==== Temple of Asclepius ====
Near the Roman Bridge and north of the Barbara Baths was one of the most monumental temples of the Roman city. Its remains were uncovered in 1977–1979 during the construction of an underground car park. The complex occupied an area of 170 m × 88 m, more than a complete insula width. For its construction, considerable embankments were made along the river for flood protection. Together with the large buildings of the Barbara Baths, the temple probably dominated the cityscape above the Moselle Bridge to a large extent.

A marble sculpture, now lost, and the inscription of a financial procurator point to the dedication to the god Asclepius. An exceptionally large hoard of coins was discovered at the northern edge of the complex in 1993. It contained 2570 aureus with a total weight of 18.5 kg. The latest coins date from the reign of Septimius Severus, and the hoard of coins is now in the Rheinisches Landesmuseum. The construction of the temple itself can be placed in the last third of the 1st century A.D. based on the find material.

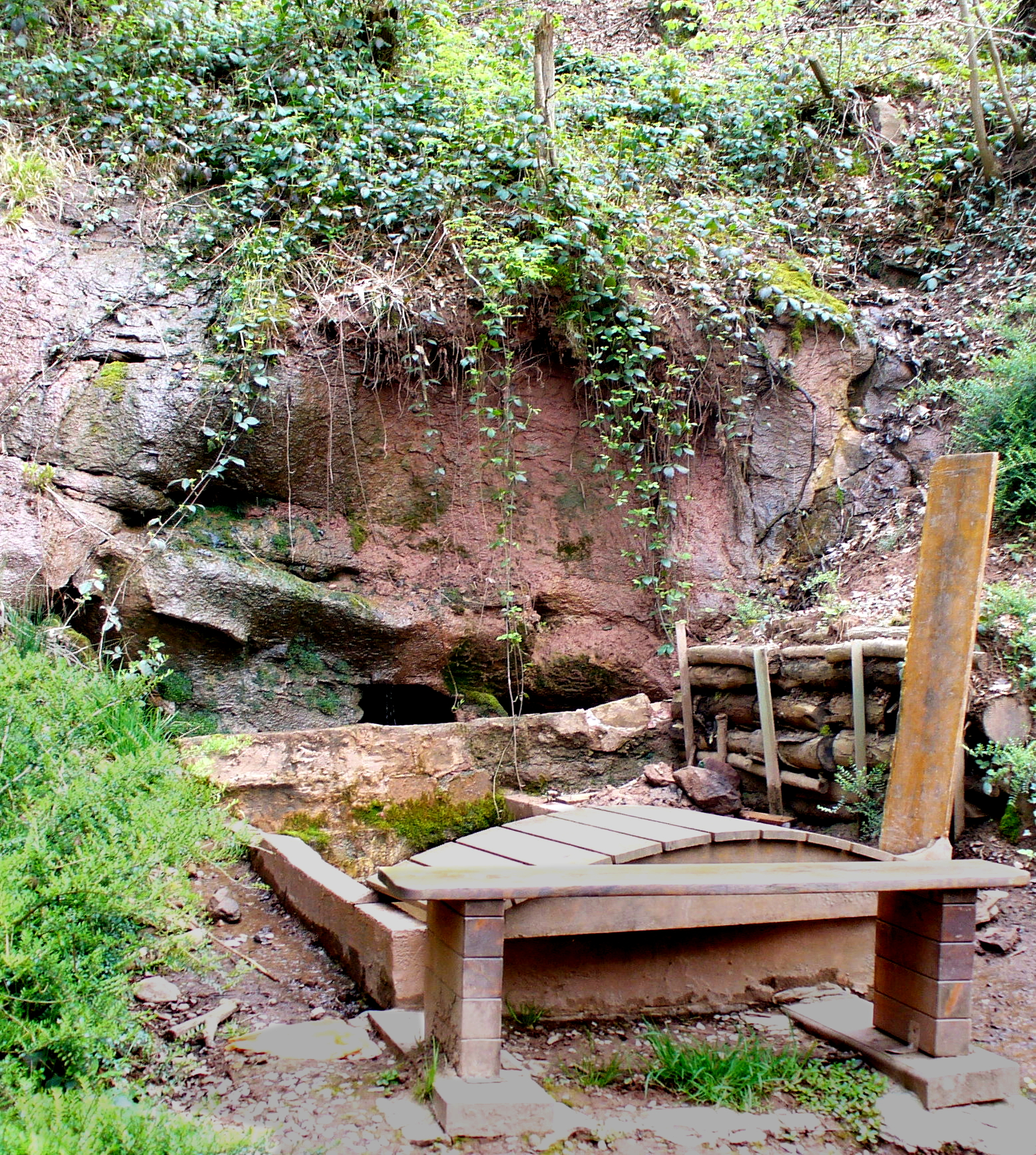
Today's spring at Irminenwingert

==== Lenus Mars Temple and Theater ====
Another large temple area was discovered on the western bank of the Moselle at the foot of the Markusberg. It was located at a slight valley incision, where the spring, later called Heideborn, which was revered as having healing powers, emerged. In the area of the Irminenwingert (therefore also called temple at the Irminenwingert) a walled district in the form of an irregular quadrangle of more than 100 meters side length could be proven.

The entire complex with hostel, main temple and cult theater is addressed as a Treverian national sanctuary with monumental furnishings. Worshipped here was the local equation of the god Mars with the Treverian Lenus, who also played an important role in other regional sanctuaries such as Martberg. The less warlike character of Lenus, who was worshipped more as a healing god, is also evident from the furnishings of the complex. According to the series of coins, the complex was used from the pre-Roman period until the time of Gratian († 383 AD).

=== Roman bridge ===
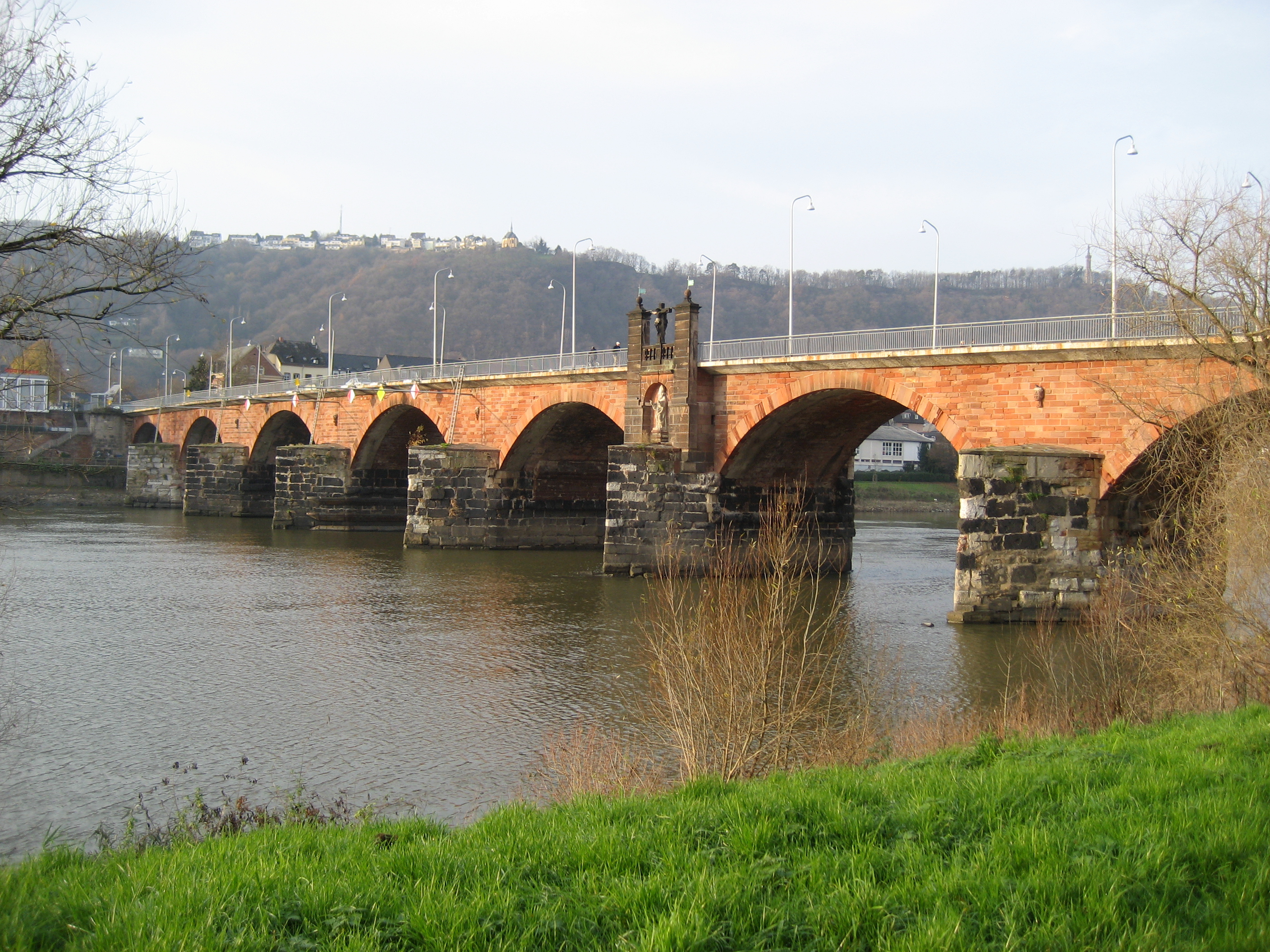
View of the Roman bridge from the east

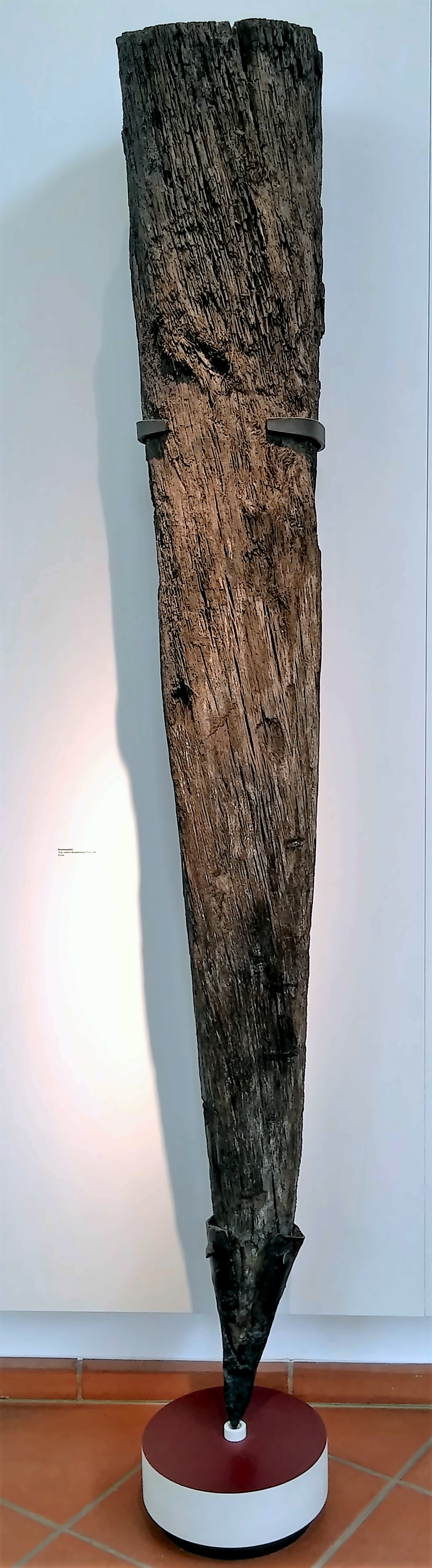
Bridge pile (Trier), second Moselle bridge, 71 AD

The Roman bridge over the Moselle, which is visible today, had at least two predecessor buildings, which have been proven archaeologically. This can be explained by its location on the Roman trunk roads, but the Roman bridge also had to accommodate inner-city traffic to the Vicus Voclanionum, which is attested in inscriptions on the western bank, as well as to the Lenus Mars temple there. The dendrochronological evidence of a bridge in 18/17 BC is thus an important fixed point for the foundation of Augusta Treverorum.

This first wooden bridge construction apparently suffered damage during the battles mentioned by Tacitus in the Batavian Revolt in 69. The construction of a pile-grate bridge can be fixed to the year 71 in the reign of Emperor Vespasian. It received mighty, pentagonal stream piers from up to 31 cm thick oak trunks, which were rammed into the river. The bridge piers were made of limestone, and the roadway was supported by a beam truss structure.

The present Roman bridge was built between 144 and 155 under Antoninus Pius. Above the existing bridge, new stream piers were erected, but they were no longer made of wooden piles but of limestone ashlars up to six courses, which is why this bridge is called a stone pier bridge. Since considerable fill was made on the city side bank in the early imperial period, this bridge required only nine piers instead of eleven. Towers and gates at both bridgeheads protected the structure. Probably due to the increased water level caused by the narrowing of the river and problems with flooding, the bridge was initially not given a solid stone arch, but a wooden deck that had to be replaced regularly. This was not added until 1343 under Archbishop Balduin of Luxembourg. Significant are the numerous river finds from the bridge area, which are exhibited in the Rheinisches Landesmuseum. Among them are tools, coins (as river sacrifices), lead seals, jewelry, small bronzes, and even stone monuments.

=== Water supply ===
The supply of drinking water to the city was particularly favored by its geographical location. In addition to the river water of the Moselle, several streams flowing into the Trier valley from the east could be used. Spring outlets in the city area were captured and connected to the local water pipes. Healing springs such as the so-called Römersprudel southeast of the city were also provided with spring catchments. On the Lower Terrace, additional wells were dug on groundwater-bearing strata in the private sector, while on the Middle Terrace these extended to strata in the slaty subsoil with water flowing down to the valley. A canal line led from a spring at Heiligkreuzberg to a distribution chamber near the temple at Herrenbrünnchen. Two successively constructed distribution basins were uncovered on the site of the Imperial Baths.

For the founding city of the 1st century, these facilities were initially sufficient. To meet the needs of the growing city, the Ruwer Valley water pipeline was built in the early 2nd century. It carried water, diverted from the Ruwer River at Waldrach, over a distance of 12.798 km to the city, which it reached at the amphitheater. It is a masonry walkable canal, which was led in sections (valley cut of Kürenz, proven at the Imperial Baths) via aqueduct constructions.

Further distribution in the city was by masonry canals lined with waterproof opus signinum aggregate; in the outer districts there is occasional evidence of pipes in wooden logs with iron dike rings. Of more upscale design are water pipes made of lead; like the wooden logs, they were usually about 10 Roman feet (3 m) long.

=== Late antique buildings ===
Already in the 2nd century, a representation and administration area had been created in the northeast of the city by merging four insulae, the core of which was a central hall, which is addressed as the Palace of the Legates. The remodeling from the beginning of the 4th century in the context of the establishment of the imperial residence is also concentrated in this area, although smaller construction measures in the forum and the streets of the city are attested. By laying down a residential quarter, space was made for the monumental building of the Imperial Baths. The Palastaula (Constantine Basilica) was built on the former legate's palace, which, with surrounding forecourts and outbuildings, formed the core of the residence.

At the same time, the backfilling with rubble of an old arm of the Moselle, which had formed a lake until this time, indicates large-scale demolition work within the city. Also near the harbor on the Moselle, a large double storage facility (horreum, ca. 70 m × 20 m) was built around 300 on the site of today's Vereinigte Hospitien, which served to supply the city and the imperial court. Several walls of it, divided by blind arcades, have been preserved.

However, construction activity already came to a standstill in Constantinian times. It was probably not completed until the reign of Gratian around 379. Basilica, Imperial Baths and the Circus formed a unit as a palace district. The juxtaposition of the Circus and the residential area was deliberately created as a parallel to the urban Roman topography (Circus Maximus and Palatine). It is repeated at the Circus Neronis (in Caesar's gardens), the Villa of Maxentius on the Via Appia, and the residence of Galerius at Thessaloniki.

==== Imperial Baths ====
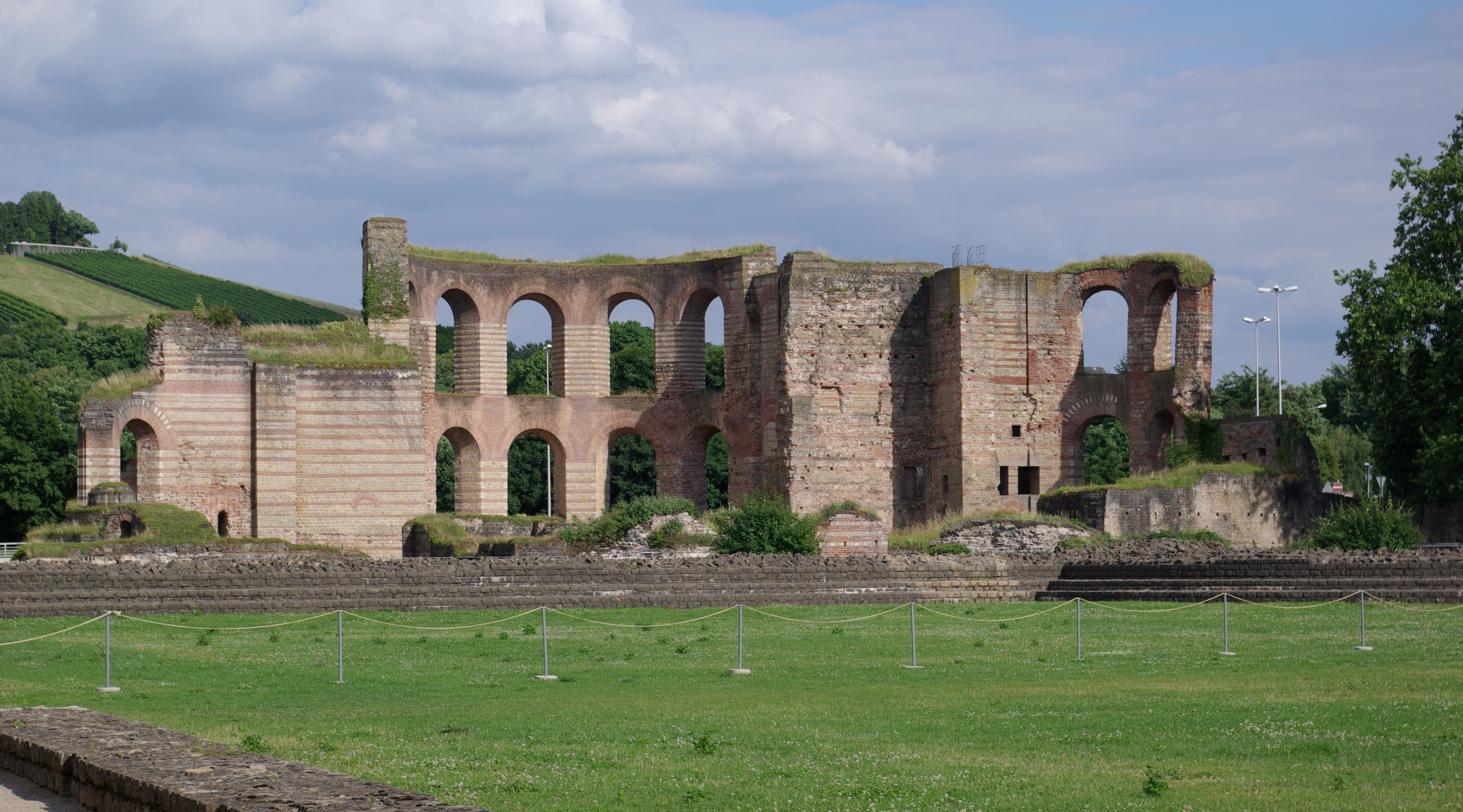
East side of the Imperial Baths

Today, the Imperial Baths are one of the most famous Roman buildings in Trier. The time of their construction is not completely clear; they were probably built after 294, when Trier was developed into a residence. Whether they were commissioned by Constantius I or his son Constantine is unknown. The oldest settlement of the area consisted of simple wooden buildings with cellars and storage pits; it can probably be dated before the middle of the 1st century. After that, two larger stone buildings were built, which were later combined into a magnificent residential building. The rich findings (including the Polydus mosaic) prove the use of the building until the second half of the 3rd century.

According to its original conception, the resulting thermal complex is one of the largest buildings of its kind in the Roman Empire; only the urban Roman thermal complexes of the emperors Trajan, Caracalla and Diocletian were larger. The ground plan corresponds to the so-called small imperial type, which is, however, already familiar from the older Baths of Barbara.

However, the Imperial Baths were never actually put into operation. Probably already with the transfer of the residence to the east after 324 the work on it stopped, although large parts of the construction were already completed beyond the first floor. It was not until Valentinian I chose Trier as his residence again that work was resumed, but with a completely different conception. The already completed bathing facilities were removed and the western part with the frigidarium was demolished. The circular hall of the tepidarium was used as an entrance hall, and the palaestra was significantly enlarged and transformed into a paved square. Interpretations vary between residential palace, imperial forum and – most likely in the opinion of the excavator – barracks for the imperial bodyguard (scholae palatinae). In the Middle Ages, large parts of the complex were integrated into the city's fortifications, preserving, for example, the eastern facade, which is over 20 meters high.

==== Constantine Basilica ====
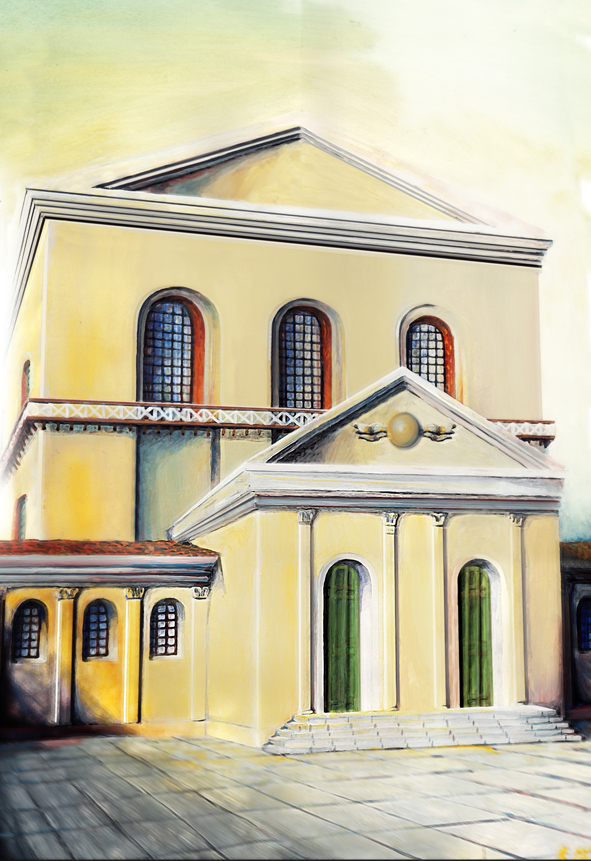
Reconstruction of the shop front with the main entrance

Although the name and appearance of today's Constantine(s) Basilica seem to refer to an ancient church building, the structure was originally built as the reception hall of the imperial residence. The frequently used name Palastaula or Aula Palatina is more accurate, but is unattested in classical Latin. The basilica has a length of 69.8 m (including the 12.4 m long apse) with a width of 27.2 m. In antiquity, it possessed a height of about 30 m. The exterior is 2.7 m thick. The 2.7 m thick exterior walls were of brick masonry and plastered on the outside. Parts made of red sandstone are modern additions.

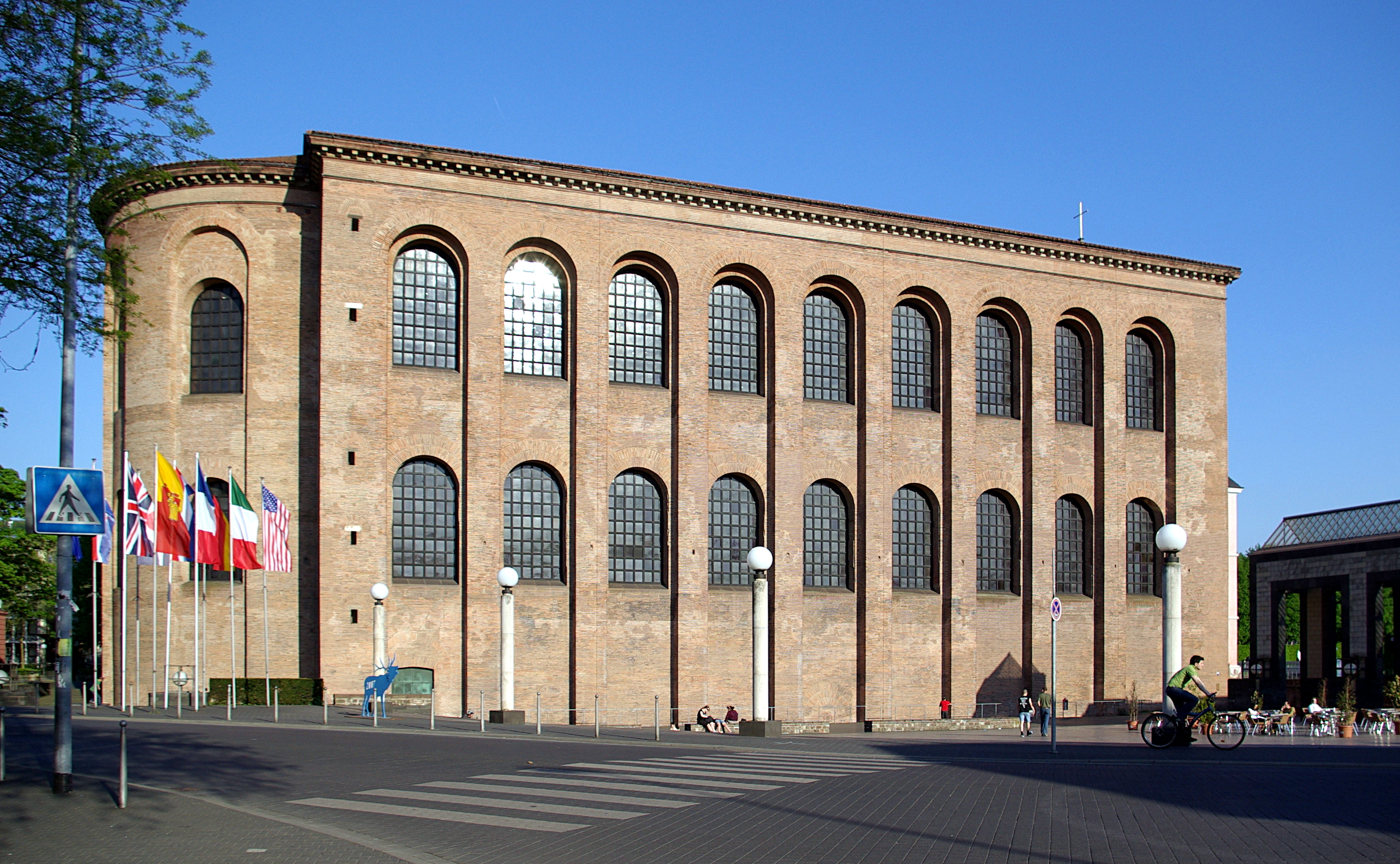
View of Palastaula from the west

The interior had a quality wall covering: The nave and apse had flooring and wall paneling of inlaid marble slabs (opus sectile) up to the height of the uppermost window cornices, of which remnants and especially the holes of the iron brackets have survived. Above this followed stucco work up to the cantilevered ceiling, which may not have been dissimilar to the present coffered ceiling inserted in 1955. Remarkable are the heating systems, through which the 1600 m^{2} interior was heatable via a three-part hypocaust with five praefurnia. The basilica was not a stand-alone building in ancient times. In the south, in front of the main entrance, there was a porch also covered with marble, and on the outside there were porticoes with courtyards leaned against them. The remains of these buildings are either preserved or marked in the pavement of the present square.

The Palastaula was probably erected as a representative building in the years 305–311 when it was converted into a residence. The monumental building served as a backdrop for audiences, receptions and court ceremonial, with the emperor's throne assumed to be in the apse. Considerable leveling was required for the large structure, which also covered a street intersection. The western block previously housed the official residence of a high imperial official.

After the end of Roman rule, the burnt-out building was added to the Frankish royal estate. In 902 the ruins were donated to the Bishop of Trier. Subsequently, the basilica was rebuilt into a castle-like complex, the apse was closed to the tower, while in the walled interior of the church economic and cellar buildings were created. After 1614, the south and east walls were demolished and the masonry was integrated into the new Electoral Palace or used as a courtyard. After being plundered by French Revolutionary troops in 1794, the complex served as barracks and a military hospital. In 1844, Prussian King Frederick William IV ordered its reconstruction as a place of worship for Trier's Protestant community. During the Second World War, the palace and basilica were severely destroyed. Reconstruction could not be started until 1954, allowing excavations and accurate recordings of the building fabric.

==== Cathedral ====
The transition of the city from Late Antiquity to the Middle Ages can be seen in the cathedral as the nucleus of

Domstein in Trier	Giant column in the late Roman quarry at Felsberg in the Odenwald forest

medieval Trier. Accordingly, it has been archaeologically explored since 1843. Larger excavations took place after the Second World War until 1981; they established as the oldest layer a noble Roman residential quarter of the 2nd and 3rd centuries AD. This included a state hall richly decorated with wall and ceiling paintings. Parts of the building are preserved under the crossing of the cathedral, and the reconstructed frescoes are exhibited in the Cathedral and Diocesan Museum. The rich decoration has led to the fact that the complex is partly attributed to a late antique palace building.

The residential buildings were demolished and leveled in the early 4th century. A double church complex with two east-facing, three-aisled basilicas was built. The columns of the north basilica were made of Odenwald granite, which was transported here from the Felsenmeer near Lautertal via the Rhine and Moselle rivers. The cathedral stone lying in front of the cathedral still indicates this. The width of the two church complexes, including the transverse buildings and peristyle courtyards, was probably between 40 (north basilica) and 30 meters (south basilica below today's Liebfrauenkirche), with a length of 150 meters each. Between the two churches there was a square baptistery, which is marked today in the paving of the cathedral courtyard. After a destruction towards the end of the fourth century, the northern basilica was rebuilt and a square building with a side length of 41.5 m was erected in the area of the crossing. Along Windstrasse on the north side of the cathedral, the associated brickwork is still visible to a height of 30 m.

=== Cemeteries ===
The cemeteries of the Middle Imperial Period have only been partially explored and their extent is largely unknown. In the earliest phase of settlement until around the middle of the 2nd century, smaller necropolises close to the settlement were established near the Moselle and along the Olewiger Straße towards the amphitheater. With the construction of the city wall these cemeteries had to be abandoned. The cemeteries to the south and north of the city were relocated, so that some earlier burials were also discovered within the later walled area. The usual form of burial at this time was cremation. Corpse burials do not appear until the 2nd century, sarcophagi are attested from the middle of the 2nd century.

After the construction of the city wall, the largest necropolises were located along the northern and southern arterial roads. In the northern cemetery, burials were initially concentrated along the road that ran slightly west of today's Paulinstraße. After the draining of an old arm of the Moselle, this area could also be used for burials up to today's Steinhausenstraße, so that burials of the 4th century in particular are found here. The southern burial ground extended along today's Matthiasstraße. From the middle imperial period more than 2000 inventories of cremation burials have come to the State Museum. Later sarcophagus burials were concentrated under the church there, in the northwest the cemetery was bordered by the pottery district.

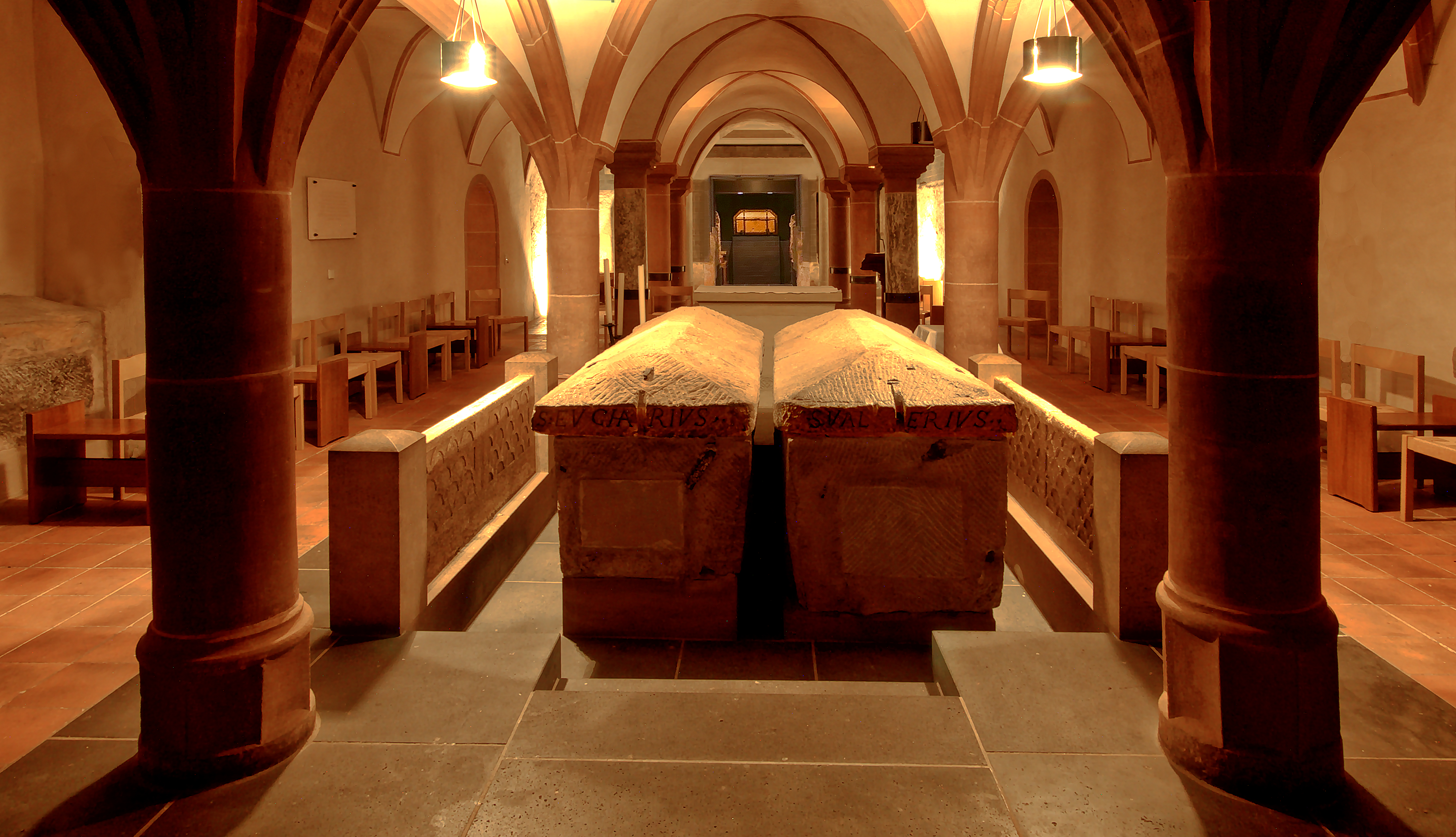
Sarcophagi of Bishops Eucharius and Valerius in St. Matthias

East of the city in front of the city wall north of the amphitheater cremation and inhumation graves were found, which are today built over. A cemetery with body burials of the 3rd and 4th centuries is located on the slope above the amphitheater. Rich grave goods of glass and ceramic vessels are known from this cemetery. On the western bank of the Moselle were cemeteries in the present-day districts of Trier-West/Pallien and Euren along the road leading to Reims.

The above-ground design of the graves could be very different. Stone monuments from the associated grave streets are known in the Trier region especially with the Neumagen stone monuments and the Igel column. Particularly wealthy people occasionally had underground burial chambers with a temple building above built, as they were preserved for example at the West Cemetery, with the burial chamber at the Reichertsberg or the Grutenhäuschen. It is not certain whether the so-called Franzensknüppchen on the Petrisberg above Trier is a monumental burial tumulus.

In late antiquity, tombs were concentrated at the burial places of saints, bishops and martyrs. Medieval churches developed from these burial chapels located outside the city walls. A parallel development can be traced in many late Roman cities; in Trier it can be grasped in three places with the late Roman tombs under the Paulinus Church, the St. Matthias' Abbey and the St. Maximin's Abbey.

=== Surrounding area ===
Already in the middle imperial period, larger Villa Rustica were built in the surrounding area of the city, which profited from the short distances to the markets and were therefore – as in the immediate vicinity of many Roman cities – significantly larger. Examples of such complexes can be found in Mehring and Villa Otrang. While at the time of their foundation the complexes were still designed for agriculture and cattle breeding, vineyards increased considerably in the course of the 3rd and 4th centuries. In many complexes a larger wine press house was added at this time. This may be related to the presence of the imperial court. However, Emperor Probus is also said to have issued a provision at the end of the 3rd century lifting old restrictions on vine cultivation in the provinces.

The presence of the imperial administration led to the fact that some of these complexes were particularly magnificently expanded or monumental complexes were newly built in the 4th century. An outstanding example is the Villa von Welschbillig, in front of whose main front there was a large water basin with originally 112 herms. Its location in the area of the long wall indicates an imperial domain. Similar functions are also assumed for the important late antique palace complexes of Konz (Kaiservilla von Konz) and Trier-Pfalzel (Palatiolum).

The oldest Roman road in the region is considered to be the connection from Lyon via Metz to Trier, which was laid out by Agrippa. The road, which was well preserved in places, continued as the Roman road from Trier to Cologne across the Eifel to the Rhine. The best known Roman road to Trier is the Ausonius Road, named after the Roman poet and statesman Ausonius, who was active in Treveris for a long time. It ran over the Hunsrück to Bingium, where it reached the Roman Rhine Valley Road. Further road connections led, among others, via Coriovallum (Heerlen in the Netherlands) to Colonia Ulpia Traiana (near Xanten), to Strasbourg and along the Moselle to Koblenz (Confluentes). In late antiquity, these roads had to be additionally protected with fortifications, for example at Neumagen, Bitburg and Jünkerath.

== The exploration of the Roman city ==
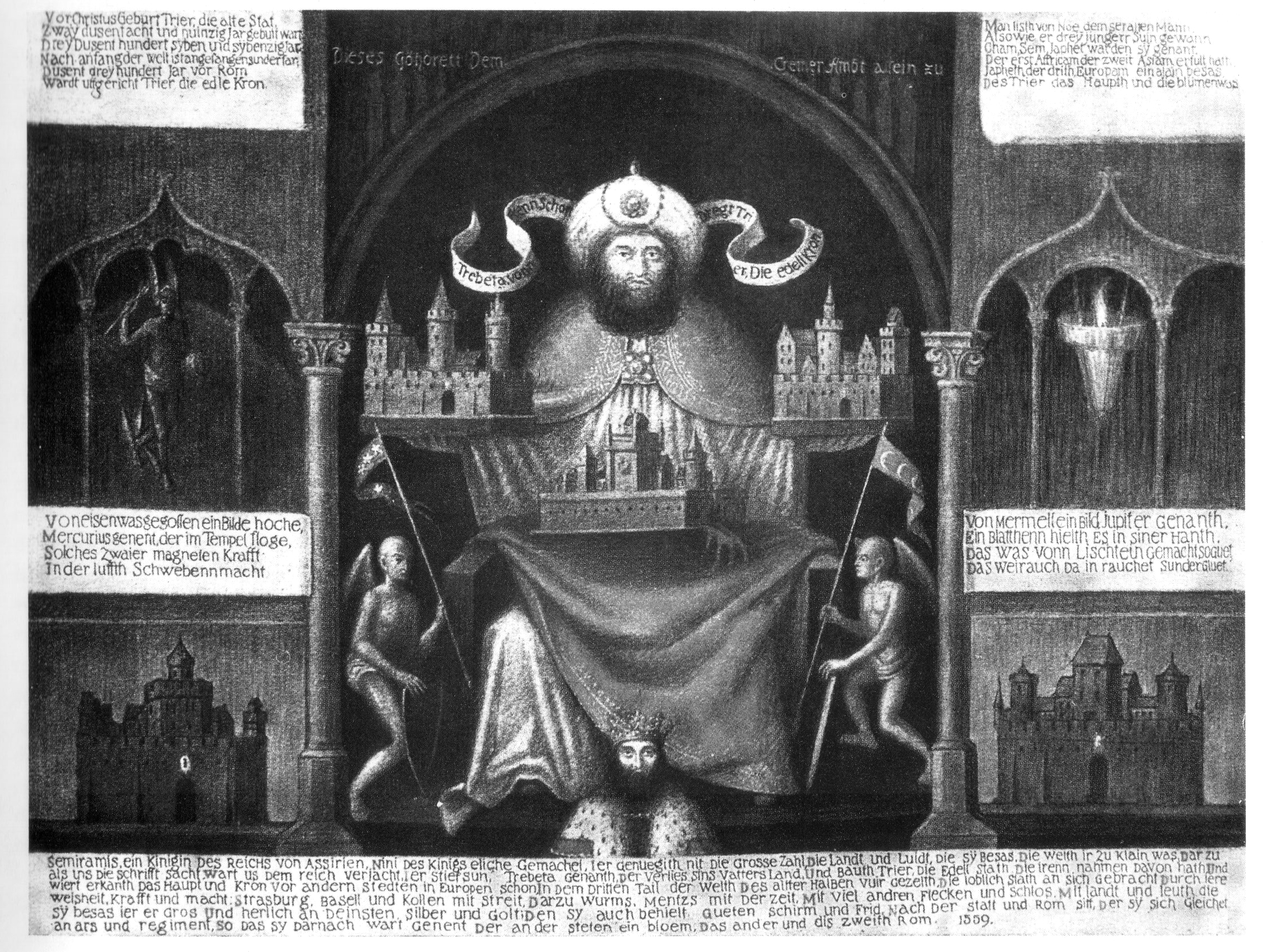
Painting of the legendary founder of the city of Trier Trebeta from 1559, destroyed in the Second World War

The ruins of the Roman city, visible for centuries, caused the Roman past to be studied in all subsequent eras. Neighboring cities with a Roman past, such as Reims, Toul and Metz, tried in the Middle Ages to trace their mythological foundation back to Remus or the kings Tullus Hostilius or Mettius Rufus. Probably to emphasize the primacy of Trier, the legend arose according to which Trier was founded by Trebeta, a son of Ninus, who is said to have been driven out of Assyria by his stepmother Semiramis. According to Orosius this happened 1300 years before the foundation of Rome. The tomb of Trebeta was believed to be recognized in the so-called Franzensknüppchen on the Petrisberg.

The supposed tomb inscription of Trebeta is documented in Trier manuscripts since about 1000 and was later adopted in the Gesta Treverorum and the chronicle of Otto von Freising. In the 15th century, it was turned into the hexameter Ante Romam Treveris stetit annis mille trecentis, which was first inscribed on the Steipe; today it is found on the Red House on Trier's Main Market Square.

As early as humanism, the Trebeta legend was doubted, first by Willibald Pirckheimer in 1512. At the same time, a more intensive examination of the Roman legacy began, especially the sculptures and inscriptions. The collection of Count Peter Ernst I von Mansfeld in Clausen included some Roman finds from Trier. Likewise, Trier is mentioned in the travelogue of geographers Abraham Ortelius and Johannes Vivianus in the 16th century. Of great importance and far ahead of its time was the work of the Jesuit Alexander Wiltheim, who mapped Roman sites with great accuracy and included sections on Augusta Treverorum, topography and economic geography of the Ardennes, Roman roads and villas. At the beginning of the 17th century, the Archbishop of Trier Philipp Christoph von Sötern ordered the opening of the Ruwer water conduit, Karl Kaspar von der Leyen had excavations carried out in the Barbara Baths.

Archaeology in Trier received significant impetus after the French Revolution and during the Napoleonic period. In 1801, the Society for Useful Research on Trier was founded from the Trier educated middle class, which soon devoted itself especially to the study of the Roman period. With the Porta Nigra, work began in Napoleonic times to uncover the ruins of the Roman period. In the Prussian period, archaeology was promoted by the Crown Prince and later King Frederick William IV. In 1820, the Prussian government and building councilor Carl Friedrich Quednow had the government's own collection of Roman stone monuments displayed in the Porta Nigra and the Imperial Baths. Also in 1820, the self-taught Quednow published a description of the antiquities in Trier and its surroundings from the Gallo-Belgian and Roman eras. The government collection was not merged with the collection of the Society for Useful Research until 1844.

At that time, there was still a conflict between the Catholic educated middle class and the Prussian administration. This conflict was only overcome in 1877 with the founding of the Provinzialmuseum Trier (today Rheinisches Landesmuseum Trier). With this, the research, preservation and museum presentation of the Roman finds of Trier had finally become a state task. The function of the Rhenish Provincial Museum as a "digging museum" continues to this day and is anchored in the Rhineland-Palatinate monument protection law.

From the end of the 19th century until the Second World War, major excavation campaigns brought the monuments of Trier into the public eye. Among them were the excavations of the amphitheater, the Imperial and Barbara Baths, and the temple district in the Altbach Valley. The construction of Trier's sewer system in 1899–1906 allowed a more detailed exploration of the city plan of the ancient metropolis. The excavations of this period are associated with the names of well-known pioneers of ancient research who worked at the Provinzialmuseum, including Felix Hettner, Hans Lehner, Wilhelm von Massow and Siegfried Loeschcke.

The extensive destruction caused by bomb damage made some areas accessible to archaeology in the post-war period that had previously been overbuilt, such as in the cathedral and the Palastaula. The traffic-oriented expansion of Trier's city center since the 1960s and other large-scale projects led to the stagnation of scientific reappraisal while financial and personnel resources remained unchanged. On the occasion of the city's 2000th anniversary in 1984, two special volumes were published on the foundation of Augusta Treverorum and on the late antique imperial residence. As a result of the increased attention, an expansion of the Landesmuseum was realized in the years 1984–1991. At the same time, however, the museum was busy with large-scale excavations (Viehmarkt 1986/87, large-scale excavation St. Maximin 1978–1994). Often the usual excavations had to be replaced by investigations during construction, although far-reaching building measures such as the construction of the underground car park at the Horten department store and behind the district administration in the Palastgarten involved rapid excavations of large inner-city areas down to below the Roman feature-bearing layers.The previously annual chronicle of finds in the Trierer Zeitschrift ceased between 1964 and 1998 for the city area, and important publications of excavation results and collection holdings were omitted. Only since 1997 has the museum been able to ensure regular publication of the results thanks to increased state and third-party funding. In order to obtain sufficient lead time for excavations, since 1998 more and more investor contracts have been concluded with building owners, which on the one hand guarantee sufficient time for scientific investigations, and on the other hand guarantee binding deadlines for the release of the building ground.

== See also ==
- List of Roman sites

== Bibliography ==
Overall presentations

- Heinz Heinen: Trier und das Trevererland in römischer Zeit. 2. leicht überarbeiteter und um einen bibliografischen Nachtrag erweiterter Nachdruck, 3. unveränderter Nachdruck. Spee, Trier 1993, ISBN 3-87760-065-4.
- Heinz Cüppers (Hrsg.): Die Römer in Rheinland-Pfalz. Lizenzausgabe, Nikol, Hamburg 2005, ISBN 3-933203-60-0, pp. 577–647.
- Franz Schön: Augusta [6] Treverorum. In: Der Neue Pauly (DNP). Band 2, Metzler, Stuttgart 1997, ISBN 3-476-01472-X, pp. 285–290.
- Hans-Peter Kuhnen: Trèves – Augusta Treverorum. In: Didier Bayard, Jean-Luc Collart, Noël Mahéo (Hrsg.): La marque de Rome. Samarobriva et les villes du nord de la Gaule. Musée de Picardie, Amiens 2006, pp. 63–72 (= Ausstellungskatalog Musée de Picardie Amiens) ISBN 978-2-908095-38-8.
- Gabriele Clemens, Lukas Clemens: Geschichte der Stadt Trier. C.H. Beck, München 2007, ISBN 978-3-406-55618-0, pp. 7–63.
- Frank Unruh: Trier: Biographie einer römischen Stadt von Augusta Treverorum zu Treveris. Philipp von Zabern, Darmstadt 2017. ISBN 978-3-8053-5011-2.

Archaeological guides and Roman buildings

- Hans-Peter Kuhnen (Hrsg.): Das römische Trier. Theiss, Stuttgart 2001, ISBN 3-8062-1517-0 (= Führer zu archäologischen Denkmälern in Deutschland 40).
- Römerbauten in Trier. Schnell & Steiner, Regensburg 2003, ISBN 3-7954-1445-8 (= Führungsheft 20, Edition Burgen, Schlösser, Altertümer Rheinland-Pfalz).
- Rheinisches Landesmuseum Trier (Hrsg.): Rettet das archäologische Erbe in Trier. Zweite Denkschrift der archäologischen Trier-Kommission. Trier 2005, ISBN 3-923319-62-2 (= Schriftenreihe des Rheinischen Landesmuseums Trier 31).
- Rheinisches Landesmuseum Trier (Hrsg.): Führer zu archäologischen Denkmälern des Trierer Landes. Trier 2008, ISBN 978-3-923319-73-2 (= Schriftenreihe des Rheinischen Landesmuseums Trier 35).

Early days

- Edith Mary Wightman: Roman Trier and the Treveri. Rupert Hart-Davis, London 1970, ISBN 0-246-63980-6
- Rheinisches Landesmuseum Trier (Hrsg.): Trier – Augustusstadt der Treverer. 2. Auflage. Philipp von Zabern, Mainz 1984, ISBN 3-8053-0792-6.
- Hans-Peter Kuhnen: Die Anfänge des römischen Trier – Alte und neue Forschungsansätze. In: Gundolf Precht (Hrsg.): Genese, Struktur und Entwicklung römischer Städte im 1. Jahrhundert n. Chr. in Nieder- und Obergermanien. Kolloquium vom 17. bis 19. Februar 1998 im Regionalmuseum Xanten. Von Zabern, Mainz 2001, ISBN 3-8053-2752-8 (= Xantener Berichte, Band 9), S. 143–156.

Late antiquity

- Rheinisches Landesmuseum Trier (Hrsg.): Trier – Kaiserresidenz und Bischofsstadt. 2. Auflage. Mainz 1984, ISBN 3-8053-0800-0.
- Margarethe König (Hrsg.): Palatia. Kaiserpaläste in Konstantinopel, Ravenna und Trier. Trier 2003, ISBN 3-923319-56-8 (= Schriftenreihe des Rheinischen Landesmuseums Trier 27).
- Alexander Demandt, Josef Engemann (Hrsg.): Konstantin der Große. Imperator Caesar Flavius Constantinus. Philipp von Zabern, Mainz 2007, ISBN 978-3-8053-3688-8.

Religion and temple

- Siegfried Loeschcke: Die Erforschung des Tempelbezirkes im Altbachtale zu Trier. Mittler, Berlin 1928.
- Erich Gose: Der Tempelbezirk des Lenus Mars in Trier. Mann, Berlin, 1955 (= Trierer Grabungen und Forschungen 2).
- Erich Gose: Der gallo-römische Tempelbezirk im Altbachtal zu Trier. Zabern, Mainz 1972 (= Trierer Grabungen und Forschungen 7).
- Markus Trunk: Römische Tempel in den Rhein- und westlichen Donauprovinzen. Ein Beitrag zur architekturgeschichtlichen Einordnung römischer Sakralbauten in Augst. Römermuseum Augst, Augst 1991, ISBN 3-7151-0014-1, S. 219–230 (= Forschungen in Augst 14) (Digitalisat).
- Rheinisches Landesmuseum Trier (Hrsg.): Religio Romana. Wege zu den Göttern im antiken Trier. Ausstellungskatalog Rheinisches Landesmuseum Trier 1996, ISBN 3-923319-34-7 (= Schriftenreihe des Rheinischen Landesmuseums Trier 12).
- Marcello Ghetta: Spätantikes Heidentum. Trier und das Treverer Land. Kliomedia, Trier 2008, ISBN 978-3-89890-119-2.

Imperial Baths

- Daniel Krencker: Die Trierer Kaiserthermen 1: Ausgrabungsbericht und grundsätzliche Untersuchungen römischer Thermen. Filser, Augsburg 1929 (= Trierer Grabungen und Forschungen 1).
- Ludwig Hussong, Heinz Cüppers: Die Trierer Kaiserthermen 2: Die spätrömische und frühmittelalterliche Keramik. Filser, Augsburg 1972, ISBN 3-923319-88-6 (= Trierer Grabungen und Forschungen 1, 2).
- Wilhelm Reusch, Marcel Lutz, Hans-Peter Kuhnen: Die Ausgrabungen im Westteil der Trierer Kaiserthermen 1960–1966. Der Stadtpalast des Finanzprocurators der Provinzen Belgica, Ober- und Niedergermanien. Marie Leidorf, Rahden/ Westfalen 2012 (= Archäologie aus Rheinland-Pfalz 1), ISBN 978-3-86757-651-2.

Roman bridges

- Heinz Cüppers: Die Trierer Römerbrücken. von Zabern, Mainz 1969, ISBN 3-923319-91-6 (= Trierer Grabungen und Forschungen 5).

Coin finds

- Maria Radnoti-Alföldi: Die Fundmünzen der römischen Zeit in Deutschland (FMRD). IV 3/1–2: Stadt Trier. Zabern, Mainz 1970–2006, ISBN 3-7861-1014-X (IV, 3/1), ISBN 3-8053-3727-2 (IV, 3/2).
- Maria Radnoti-Alföldi: Die Fundmünzen der römischen Zeit in Deutschland (FMRD). IV 3/6: Stadt Trier, Nachträge und Ergänzungen. Zabern, Mainz 2008, ISBN 978-3-8053-3903-2.
- Karl-Josef Gilles: Der römische Goldmünzschatz aus der Feldstraße in Trier. Trier 2013, ISBN 978-3-923319-82-4 (= Trierer Zeitschrift Beiheft 34).
- Karl-Josef Gilles: Das Münzkabinett im Rheinischen Landesmuseum Trier. Ein Überblick zur trierischen Münzgeschichte. Trier 1996, ISBN 3-923319-36-3 (= Schriftenreihe des Rheinischen Landesmuseums Trier 13).

Trier ceramic production

- Ingeborg Huld-Zetsche: Trierer Reliefsigillata: Werkstatt I. Habelt, Bonn 1972 (= Materialien zur römisch-germanischen Keramik 9).
- Ingeborg Huld-Zetsche: Trierer Reliefsigillata: Werkstatt II. Habelt, Bonn 1993 (= Materialien zur römisch-germanischen Keramik 12).
- Susanna Künzl: Die Trierer Spruchbecherkeramik. Dekorierte Schwarzfirniskeramik des 3. und 4. Jahrhunderts. Trier 1997, ISBN 3-923319-35-5 (= Beihefte Trierer Zeitschrift 21).

Mosaics

- Peter Hoffmann, Joachim Hupe, Karin Goethert: Katalog der römischen Mosaike aus Trier und dem Umland. Rheinisches Landesmuseum Trier (= Trierer Grabungen und Forschungen 16). Zabern, Mainz 1999, ISBN 3-8053-2610-6 / ISBN 3-923319-42-8.
- Peter Hoffmann: Römische Mosaike im Rheinischen Landesmuseum Trier. Führer zur Dauerausstellung (= Schriftenreihe des Rheinischen Landesmuseums Trier 16). Trier 1999, ISBN 3-923319-44-4.

Findings

- Wolfgang Binsfeld, Karin Goethert-Polaschek, Lothar Schwinden: Katalog der römischen Steindenkmäler des Rheinischen Landesmuseums Trier. 1. Götter- und Weihedenkmäler. Zabern, Mainz 1988, ISBN 3-8053-0286-X (= Corpus signorum Imperii Romani. Bd. 4, 3 Trier und Trierer Land. Zugleich: Trierer Grabungen und Forschungen 12).
- Antje Krug: Römische Gemmen im Rheinischen Landesmuseum Trier. Trier 1995, ISBN 3-923319-32-0 (= Schriftenreihe des Rheinischen Landesmuseums Trier 10).
- Karin Goethert: Römische Lampen und Leuchter. Auswahlkatalog des Rheinischen Landesmuseums Trier. Trier 1997, ISBN 3-923319-38-X (= Schriftenreihe des Rheinischen Landesmuseums Trier 14).
- Hans-Peter Kuhnen (Hrsg.): abgetaucht, aufgetaucht. Flussfundstücke. Aus der Geschichte. Mit ihrer Geschichte. Trier 2001, ISBN 3-923319-48-7 (= Schriftenreihe des Rheinischen Landesmuseums Trier 21).
- Rheinisches Landesmuseum Trier (Hrsg.): Fundstücke: von der Urgeschichte bis zur Neuzeit. Theiss, Stuttgart 2009, ISBN 978-3-8062-2324-8 (= Schriftenreihe des Rheinischen Landesmuseums Trier 36).

Research History

- Hans-Peter Kuhnen (Hrsg.): Propaganda. Macht. Geschichte. Archäologie an Rhein und Mosel im Dienst des Nationalsozialismus. Begleitbuch zur Ausstellung, Trier 2002 (= Schriftenreihe des Rheinischen Landesmuseums Trier 24).
- Hans-Peter Kuhnen: Forschungsgeschichte und Antikenrezeption in Trier. In: M. Landfester (Hrsg.), Der Neue Pauly. Enzyklopädie der Antike. Rezeptions- und Wissenschaftsgeschichte. Bd. 15,3 (Stuttgart – Weimar), Sp. 565–578.
- Hans-Peter Kuhnen: Trèves – une métropole gallo-romaine confrontée à la sauvegarde du patrimoine archéologique. In: Didier Bayard, Jean-Luc Collart, Noël Mahéo (Hrsg.): La marque de Rome. Samarobriva et les villes du nord de la Gaule. Musée de Picardie, Amiens 2006, S. 190–194 (= Ausstellungskatalog Musée de Picardie Amiens) ISBN 978-2-908095-38-8.
