= Emmerting (Verwaltungsgemeinschaft) =

- Verwaltungsgemeinschaft
- Location of Emmerting within Altötting district
- Interactive map of Emmerting
- Location within Germany Location within Bavaria
- Coordinates: 48°12′N 12°46′E
- Country: Germany
- State: Bavaria
- Admin. region: Upper Bavaria
- District: Altötting
- Seat: Emmerting
- Subdivisions: 2 municipalities

Area
  - Total: 37.45 km^{2} (14.46 sq mi)

Population (2025-12-31)
  - Total: 6,709
  - Density: 179.1/km^{2} (464.0/sq mi)
- Time zone: UTC+01:00 (CET)
  - Summer (DST): UTC+02:00 (CEST)
- Website: www.gemeinde-emmerting.de

Emmerting is a Verwaltungsgemeinschaft (municipal association) in the district of Altötting in Bavaria, Germany. Its seat is in Emmerting. It consists of the following municipalities:

- Emmerting
- Mehring
