= Emmerting =

- Municipality
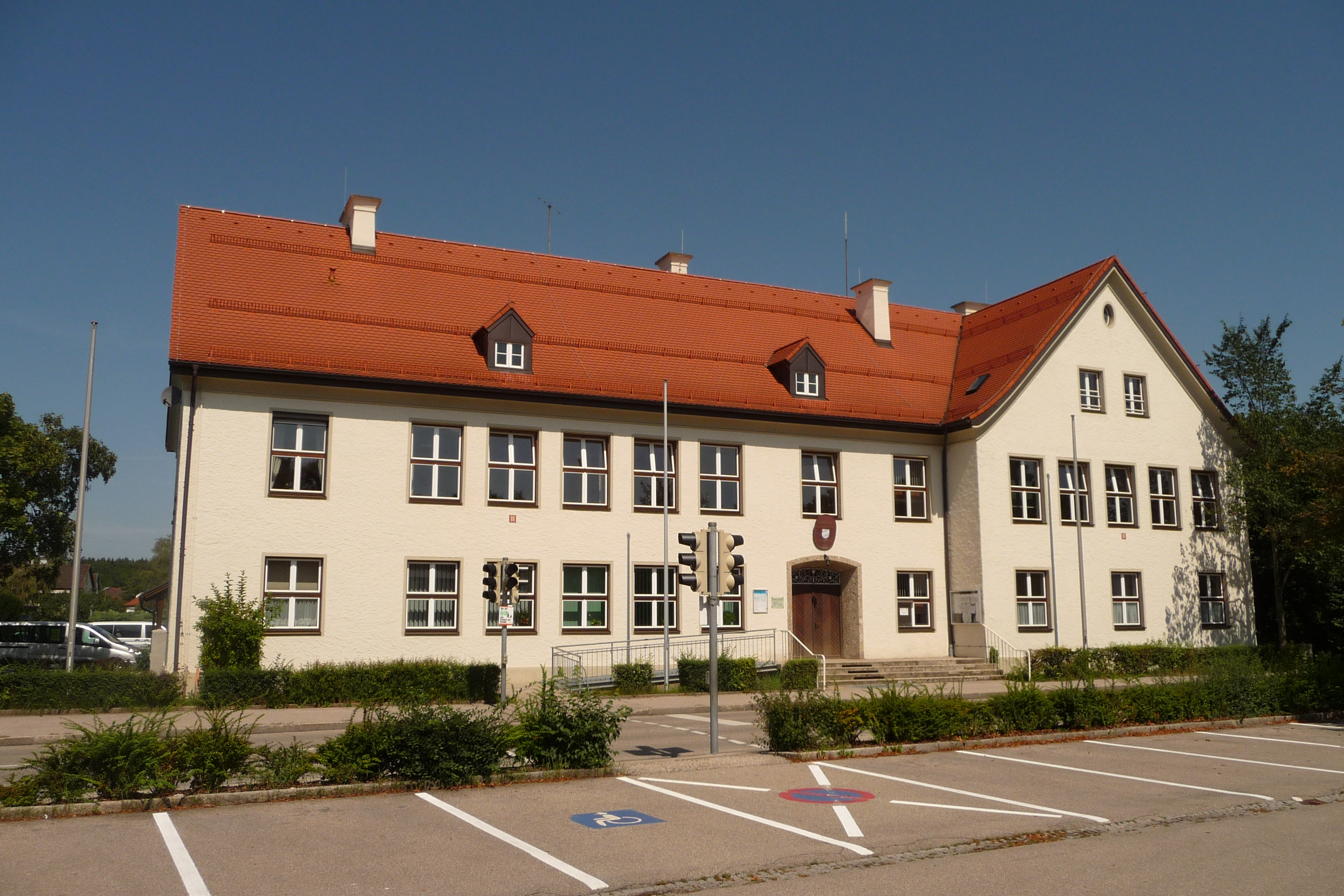
- Town hall

- Coat of arms

- Location of Emmerting within Altötting district
- Interactive map of Emmerting
- Location within Germany Location within Bavaria
- Coordinates: 48°12′N 12°46′E
- Country: Germany
- State: Bavaria
- Admin. region: Oberbayern
- District: Altötting
- Municipal assoc.: Emmerting
- Subdivisions: 4 Ortsteile

Government
  - Mayor (2020–26): Stefan Kammergruber (CSU)

Area
  - Total: 14.07 km^{2} (5.43 sq mi)
- Elevation: 390 m (1,280 ft)

Population (2025-12-31)
  - Total: 4,320
  - Density: 307/km^{2} (795/sq mi)
- Time zone: UTC+01:00 (CET)
  - Summer (DST): UTC+02:00 (CEST)
- Postal codes: 84547
- Dialling codes: 08679
- Vehicle registration: AÖ
- Website: www.gemeinde-emmerting.de

Emmerting (German pronunciation: [ˈɛmɐtɪŋ]) is a municipality in the district of Altötting in Bavaria in Germany and member of the administrative association of the same name.

== Geography ==
=== Geographical Location ===
Emmerting is located in the southeast of Upper Bavaria.

=== Structure of the municipality ===
Emmerting is divided into four parts:

- Bruck
- Oberemmerting
- Seng
- Unteremmerting

There are also the subdistricts Altöttinger Forst, Alzgerner Forst, Emmerting and Holzfelder Forst.

== History ==
=== Until the municipality foundation ===
Emmerting was first documented in 815 as Ehemutingen in a barter agreement of the Bishop of Salzburg. Emmerting belonged to the Rentamt Burghausen and to the regional court Neuötting of the Electorate of Bavaria. In the course of administrative reform in Bavaria, today's municipality came with the municipality edict of 1818

=== 19th and 20th century ===
The place is listed on cards in the 19th to the 20th century as Egmating.

In 1960 Emmerting became its own parish. As part of the Territorial Reform Emmerting and Mehring merged in 1978 to form an administrative community.

=== Spin-Off ===
In 1955 the spin-off of the district Gendorf with its industrial park to Burgkirchen an der Alz took place.

=== Population Development ===
year	1970	1987	1991	1995	2000	2005	2010	2015
population	2005	3285	3625	3894	3957	4037	4138	4130

== Politics ==
=== Mayor ===
Mayor is Stefan Kammergruber (independent). He was elected at the local election in 2014, and was re-elected in 2020.

=== Parish Council ===
The council has 16 members.

The past municipal elections on March 16, 2014 and March 3, 2008 produced the following result:

Parties	2014				2008	
Parties	Proportion	Seats	±Proportion	±Seats	Proportion	Seats
CSU	50,8 %	8	+4,2 %	±0	46,6 %	8
SPD	12,5 %	2	+2,2 %	+1	10,3 %	1
Grüne	9,1 %	2	+2,7 %	+1	6,4 %	1
Freie Wähler	27,6 %	4	−9,1 %	−2	36,7 %	6
voter turnout	51,4 %		−14,9 %		66,3 %	

Another member and chairman of the parish council is the mayor.

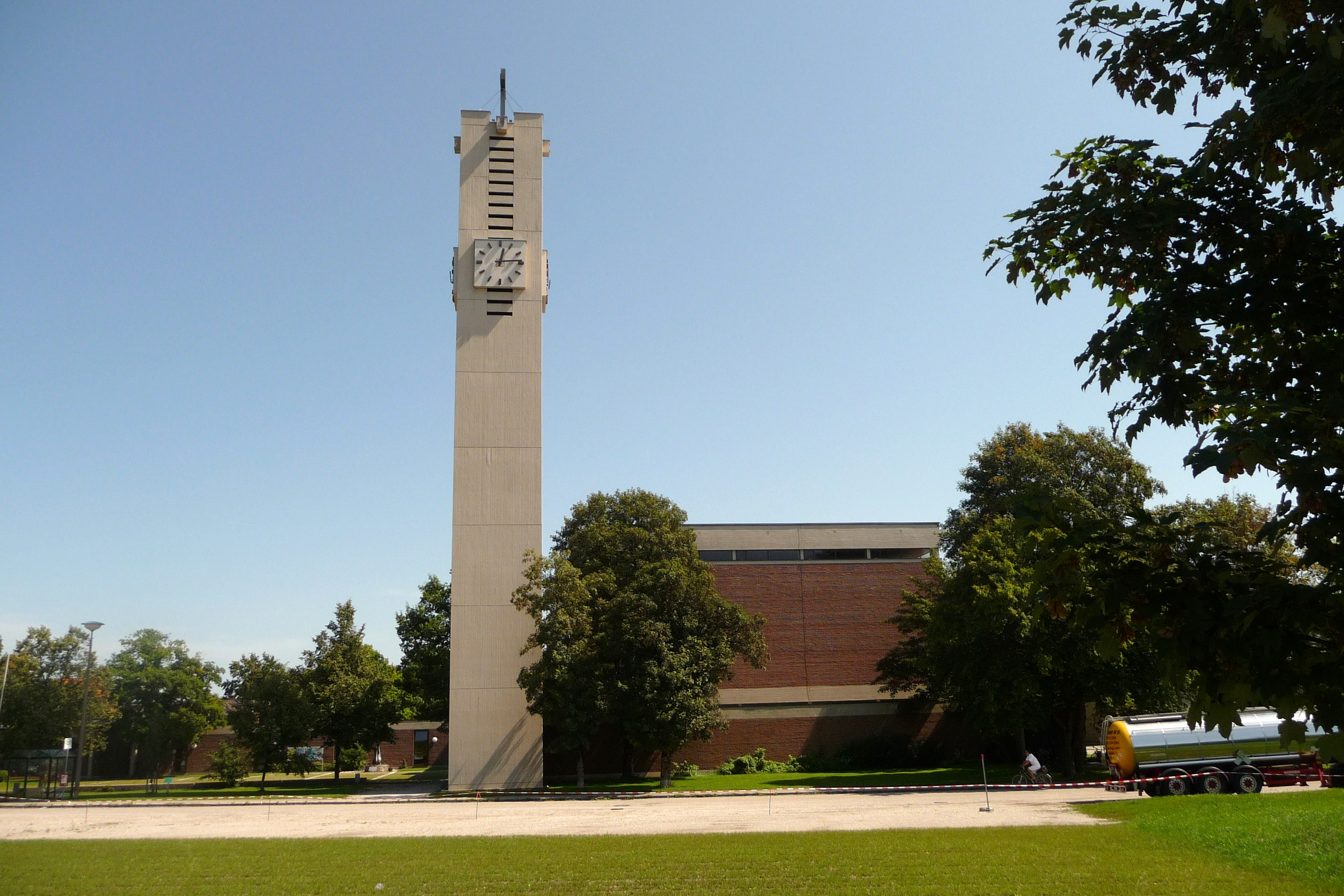
The parish church Hl. Geist

== Culture and Sights ==
The Catholic parish church Hl. Geist is a modern cubic building with a freestanding tower.

It was built from 1965 to 1967 according to plans by architect Karl Habermann and has the equipment of Wolf Hirtreiter.

== Economy and Infrastructure ==
=== Economy ===
In 2014, according to official statistics, there were 101 employees in the manufacturing industry and 44 in the area of trade, transport and hospitality industry. In other sectors of the economy, 144 persons were employed by the social insurance system at the place of work. There were a total of 1712 employees subject to social insurance at the place of residence. There were no businesses in the manufacturing sector and three companies in the construction industry. In addition, in 2010 there were seven farms with a total agricultural area of 142 ha, of which 89 ha were arable land and 53 ha were permanent green areas.

=== Education ===
There are the following institutions (state: 2015):

- Kindergartens: two institutions, 150 kindergarten places with 130 children
- Elementary school: one with 14 teachers and 228 students

Since due to small numbers of students the required minimum number for the formation of a school class was not reached, the elementary school Emmerting-Mehring was dissolved in 2009 and distributed the main students to the surrounding secondary schools Burghausen and Burgkirchen. The elementary school Emmerting remained.
