= Mehring =

- Municipality
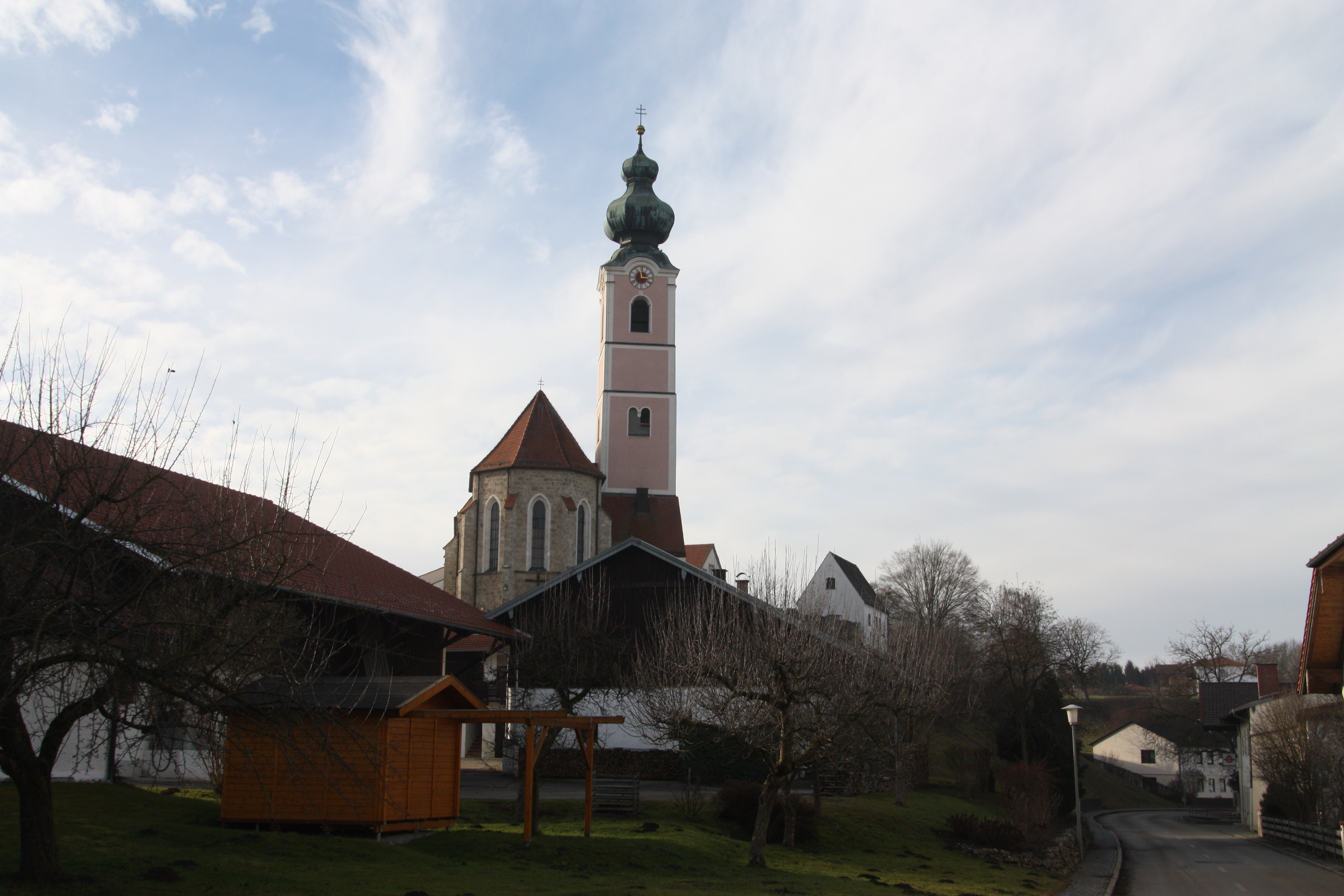
- Church of Saint Martin

- Coat of arms

- Location of Mehring within Altötting district
- Interactive map of Mehring
- Location within Germany Location within Bavaria
- Coordinates: 48°11′N 12°47′E
- Country: Germany
- State: Bavaria
- Admin. region: Oberbayern
- District: Altötting
- Municipal assoc.: Emmerting

Government
  - Mayor (2020–26): Robert Buchner

Area
  - Total: 23.37 km^{2} (9.02 sq mi)
- Elevation: 432 m (1,417 ft)

Population (2025-12-31)
  - Total: 2,389
  - Density: 102.2/km^{2} (264.8/sq mi)
- Time zone: UTC+01:00 (CET)
  - Summer (DST): UTC+02:00 (CEST)
- Postal codes: 84561
- Dialling codes: 08677
- Vehicle registration: AÖ
- Website: www.gemeinde-mehring.de

Mehring (German pronunciation: [ˈmeːʁɪŋ]) is a municipality in the district of Altötting in Bavaria in Germany.
