= Falkenseebach =

River in Germany

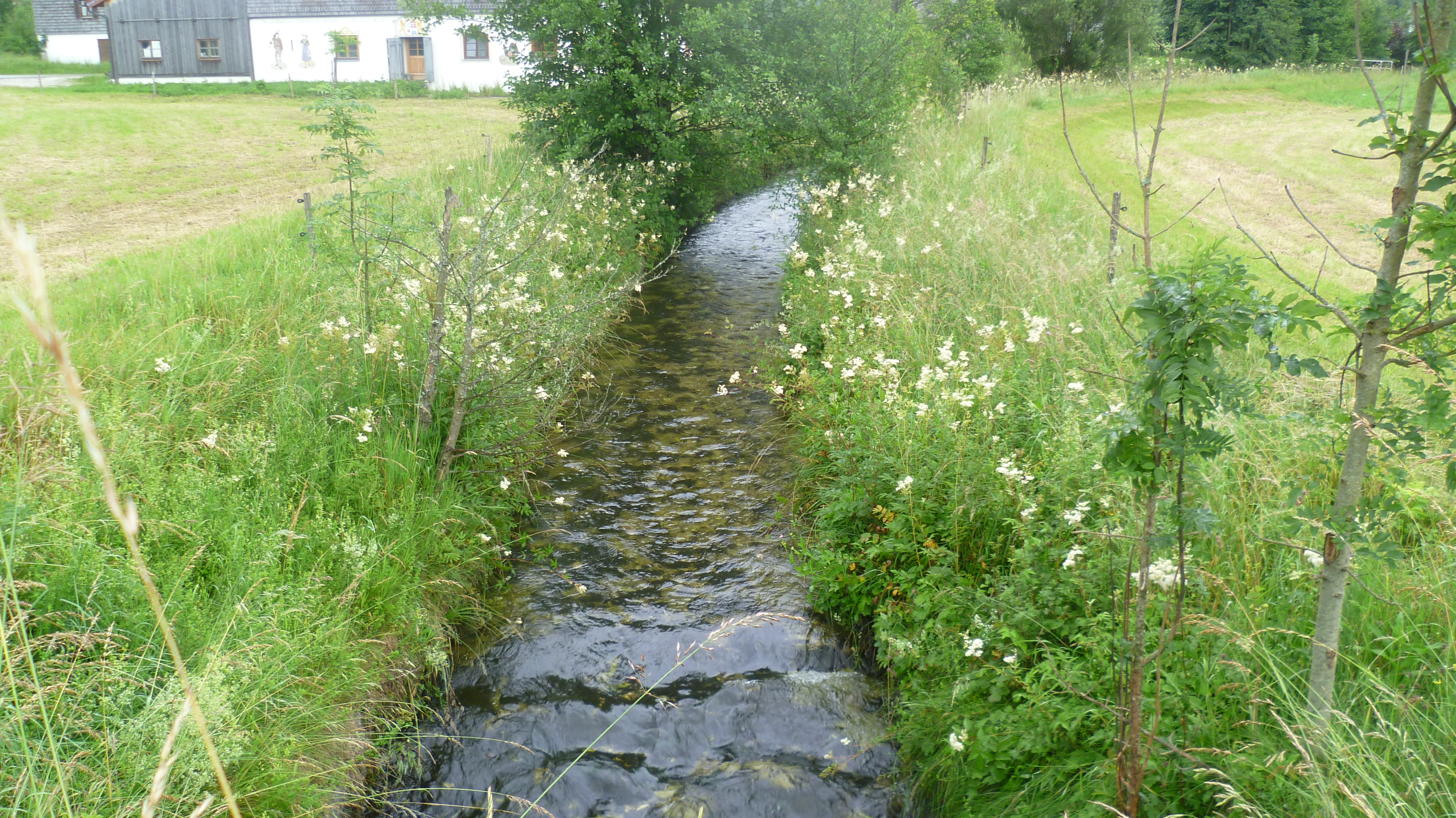
- The Falkenseebach at Inzell

Location
- Country: Germany
- State: Bavaria

Physical characteristics
- Mouth
  - location: Rote Traun
  - coordinates: 47.7640°N 12.7525°E
- Length: 4.6 km (2.9 mi)

Basin features
- Progression: Rote Traun→ Traun→ Alz→ Inn→ Danube→ Black Sea

The Falkenseebach is a river in Bavaria, Germany. Its source is about 600 m (2,000 ft) southwest of the lake Falkensee between the mountains Falkenstein (1,181 m (3,875 ft)) and Großer Turm (1,120 m (3,670 ft)) in the Eastern Chiemgau Alps. It flows northeast and then turns west where at its confluence with the Großwaldbach in Inzell, the Rote Traun is formed.

== Course ==
The Falkenseebach rises from several springs located within the Eastern Chiemgau Alps Nature Reserve. It flows through the Falkensee and continues northeast through the Weittal valley. Before reaching Inzell, it turns westward and joins the more voluminous Großwaldbach to form the Rote Traun. The Weißbach, which drains via the Saalach and Salzach, rises 200 metres (660 ft) south of the Falkenseebach.

== Gallery ==
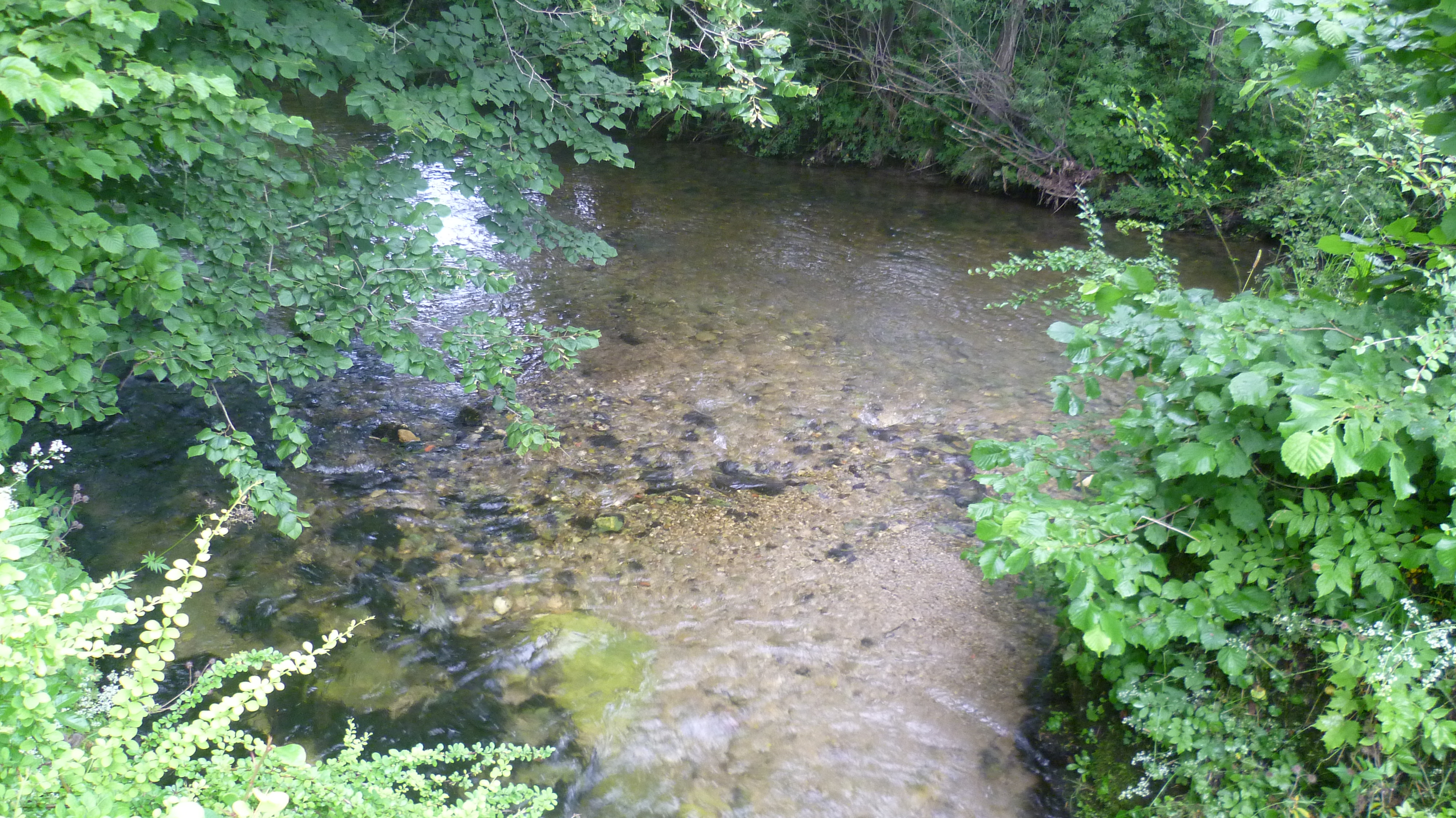
Falkenseebach (in the front), Großwaldbach (right), and Rote Traun (left)

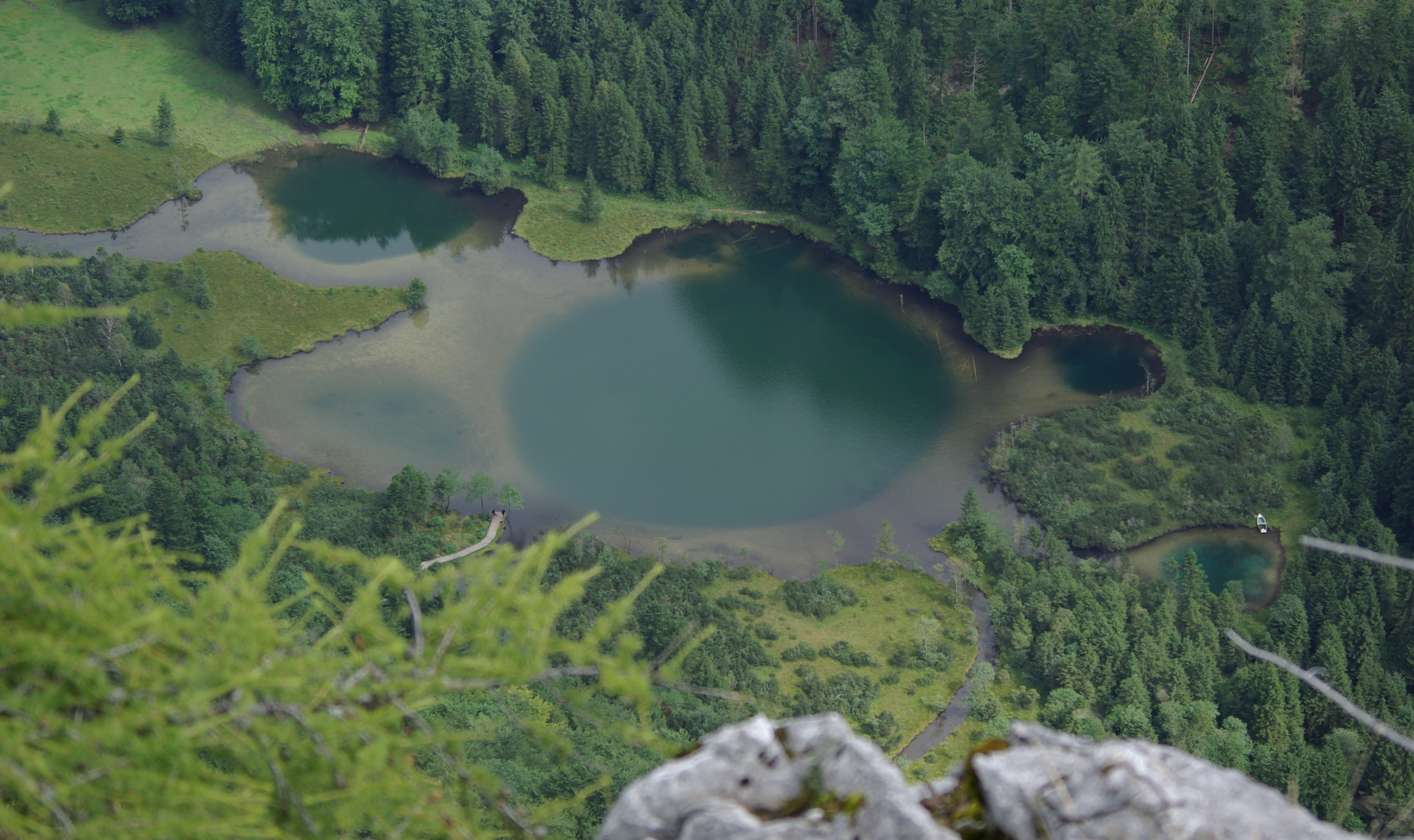
Falkensee seen from the summit of Falkensteins, looking eastwards

== See also ==
- List of rivers of Bavaria
