= Fischbach (Weiße Traun) =

River in Germany

Location
- Countries: Germany and Austria
- States: Bavaria and Salzburg

Physical characteristics
- Mouth
  - location: Weiße Traun
  - coordinates: 47.7271°N 12.6601°E
- Length: 11.8 km (7.3 mi)

Basin features
- Progression: Weiße Traun→ Traun→ Alz→ Inn→ Danube→ Black Sea

The Fischbach (German pronunciation: [ˈfɪʃˌbax]) is a river of Bavaria, Germany and of Salzburg, Austria.

The source of the river lies in the Austrian area. After 11.8 kilometres (7.3 mi), together with the Seetraun it forms the Weiße Traun in Ruhpolding's district Laubau in Bavaria, Germany.

== See also ==
- List of rivers of Bavaria
