= Großwaldbach =

River in Germany

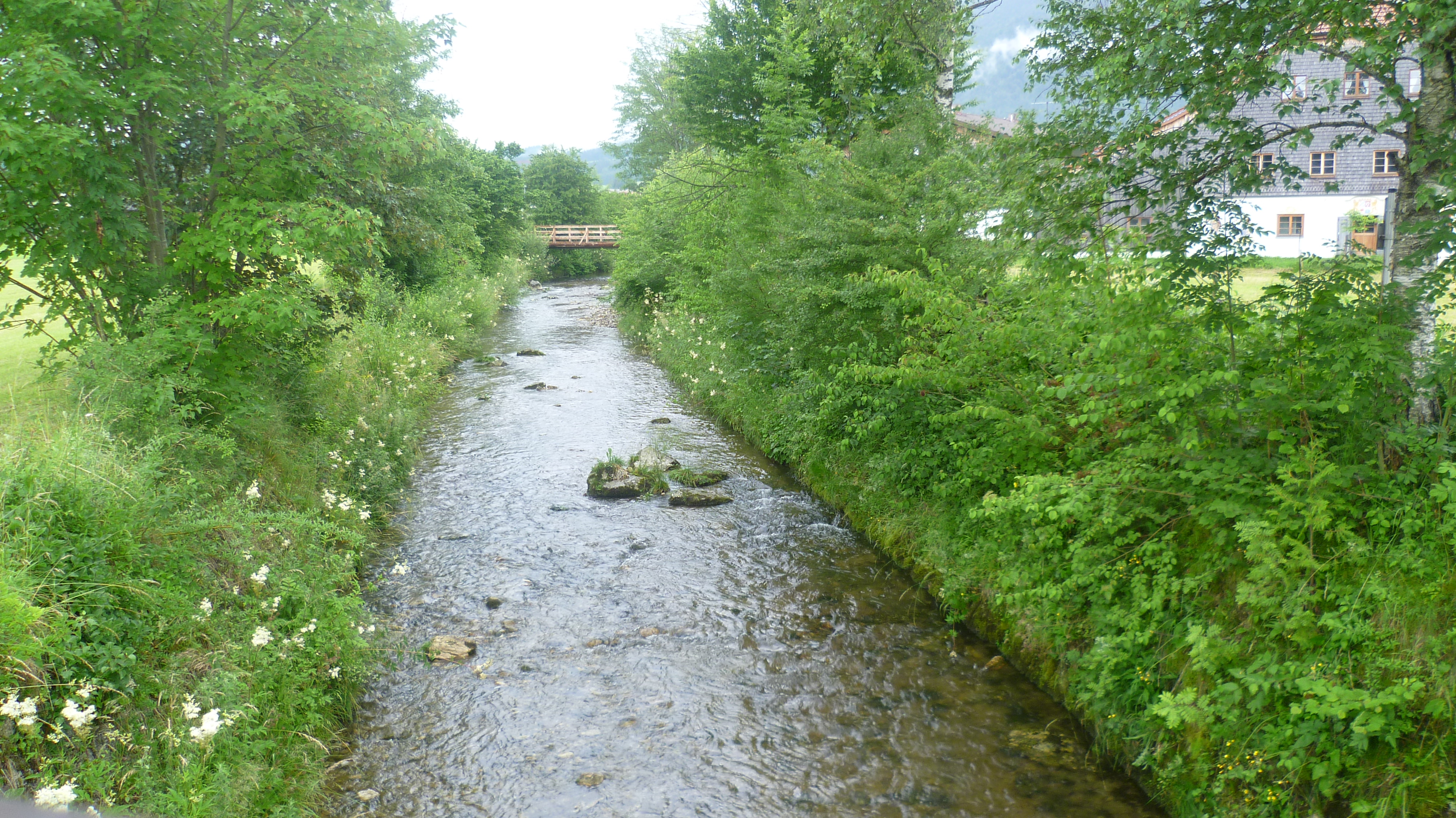
- The Großwaldbach in Inzell

Location
- Country: Germany
- State: Bavaria

Physical characteristics
- Mouth
  - location: Rote Traun
  - coordinates: 47.7640°N 12.7525°E
- Length: 7.2 km (4.5 mi)

Basin features
- Progression: Rote Traun→ Traun→ Alz→ Inn→ Danube→ Black Sea

The Großwaldbach is a river of Bavaria, Germany. At its confluence with the Falkenseebach in Inzell, the Rote Traun ( Red Traun) is formed.

== See also ==
- List of rivers of Bavaria
