= Röthelbach =

Röthelbach may refer to

- Röthelbach (Traun), a river of Bavaria, Germany, tributary of the Traun
- Röthelbach (Saalach), a river of Bavaria, Germany, tributary of the Saalach
