= Weiße Traun =

River in Baveria

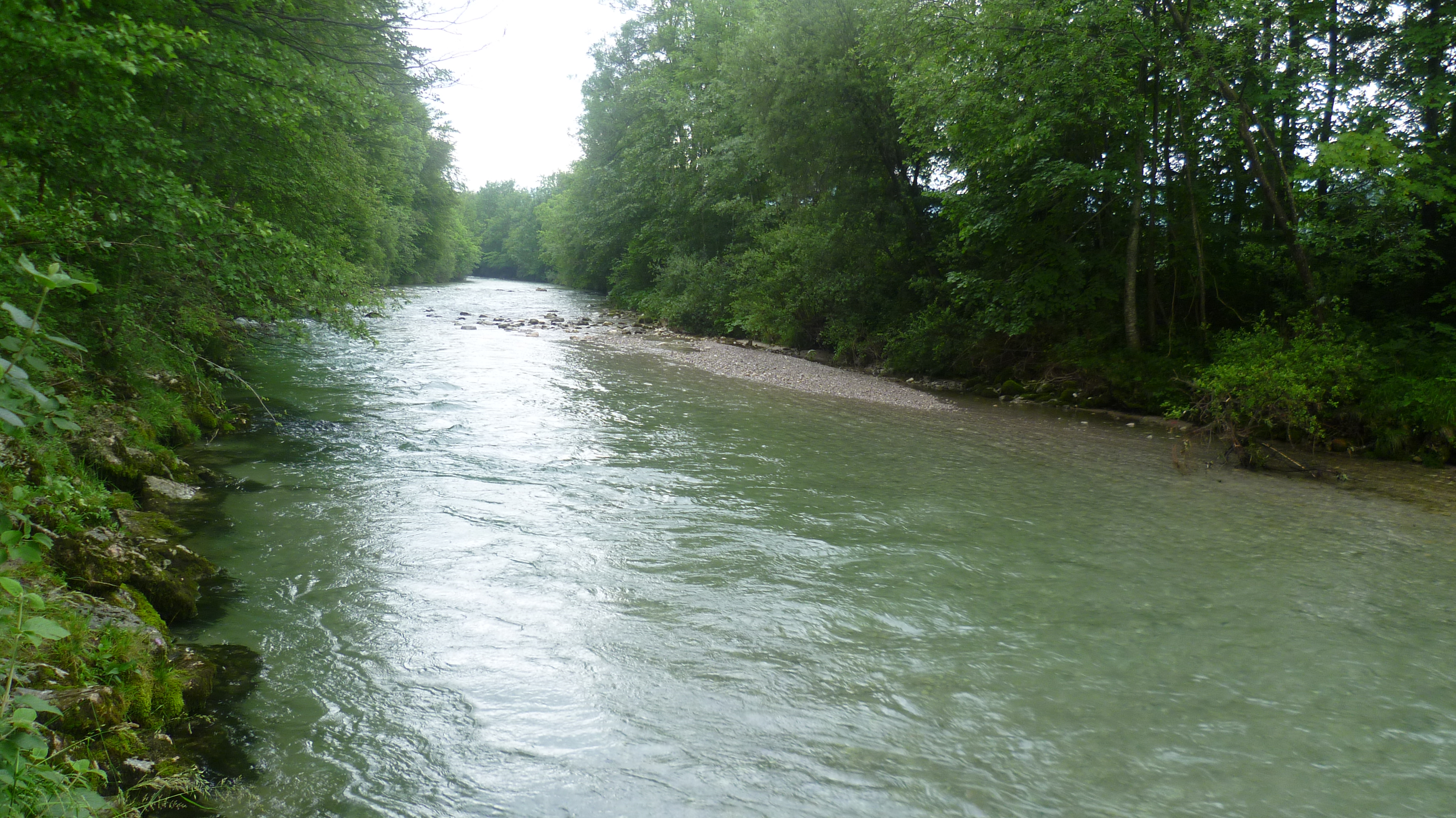
- The Weiße Traun near Siegsdorf

Location
- Country: Germany
- State: Bavaria

Physical characteristics
- Mouth
  - location: Traun
  - coordinates: 47.8328°N 12.6464°E
- Length: 13.8 km (8.6 mi)

Basin features
- Progression: Traun→ Alz→ Inn→ Danube→ Black Sea

The Weiße Traun (German pronunciation: [ˈvaɪsə ˈtʁaʊn], lit. 'White Traun') is a river of Bavaria, Germany. The nearly 14 kilometers (8.7 mi) long river is formed at the confluence of the Fischbach and the Seetraun south of Ruhpolding. At its confluence with the Rote Traun (Red Traun) near Siegsdorf, the Traun is formed.

== See also ==
- List of rivers of Bavaria
