= Rote Traun =

River in Germany

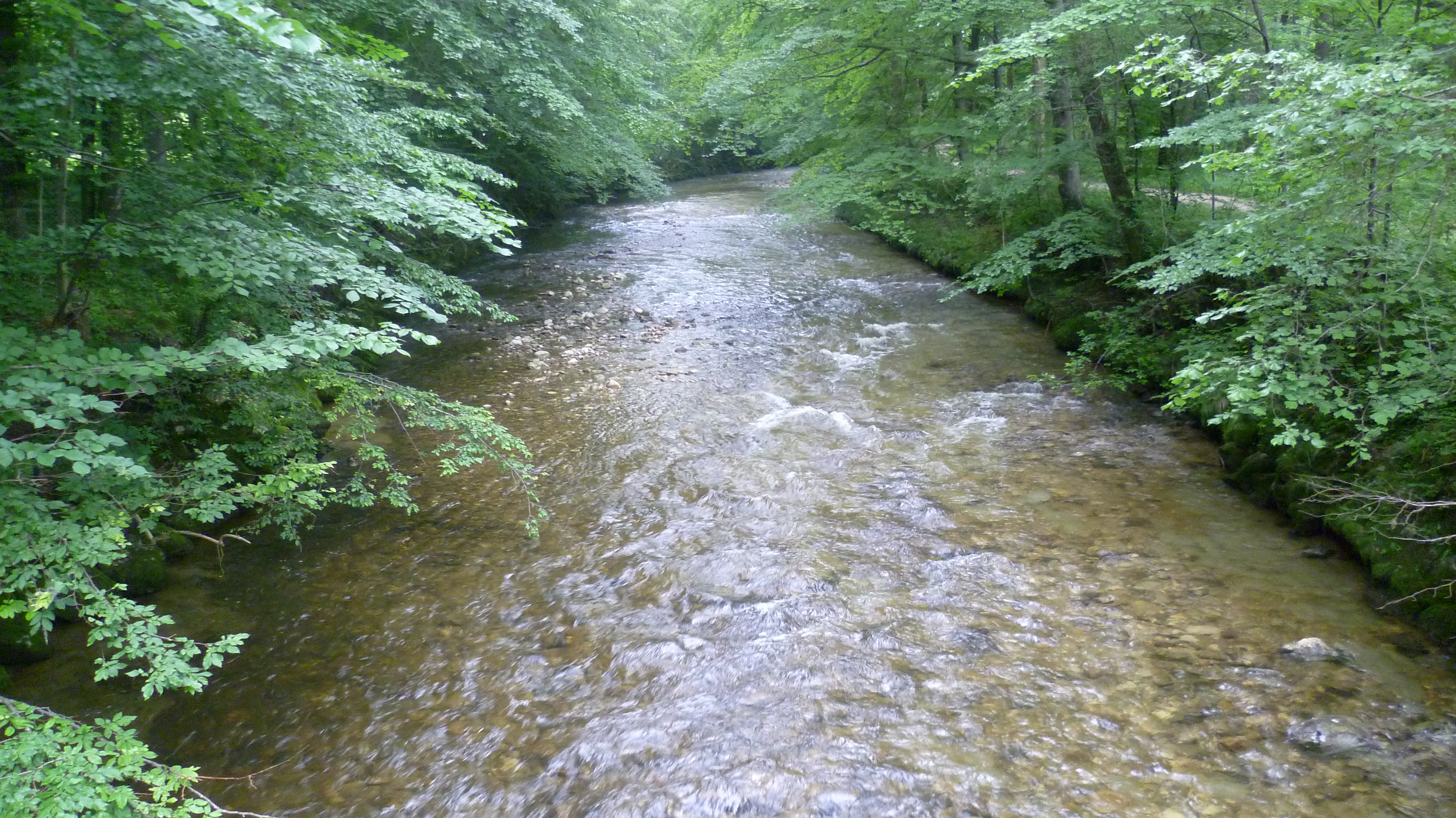
- The Rote Traun near Siegsdorf

Location
- Country: Germany
- State: Bavaria

Physical characteristics
- Mouth
  - location: Traun
  - coordinates: 47.8328°N 12.6464°E
- Length: 14.1 km (8.8 mi)

Basin features
- Progression: Traun→ Alz→ Inn→ Danube→ Black Sea

The Rote Traun (German pronunciation: [ˈʁoːtə ˈtʁaʊn], lit. 'Red Traun') is a river of Bavaria, Germany. The 14 kilometers (8.7 mi) long river is formed at the confluence of the Falkenseebach and the Großwaldbach in Inzell. At its confluence with the Weiße Traun near Siegsdorf, the Traun is formed.

== See also ==
- List of rivers of Bavaria
