= Seetraun =

River in Germany

Location
- Country: Germany
- State: Bavaria

Physical characteristics
- Mouth
  - location: Weiße Traun
  - coordinates: 47.7271°N 12.6601°E
- Length: 12.2 km (7.6 mi)

Basin features
- Progression: Weiße Traun→ Traun→ Alz→ Inn→ Danube→ Black Sea

The Seetraun (German pronunciation: [ˈzeːtʁaʊn]) is a river of Bavaria, Germany. At its confluence with the Fischbach south of Ruhpolding's Laubau district, the Weiße Traun is formed.

== See also ==
- List of rivers of Bavaria
