= Röthelbach (Traun) =

River in Germany

Location
- Country: Germany
- State: Bavaria

Physical characteristics
- Mouth
  - location: Traun
  - coordinates: 47.8621°N 12.6427°E
- Length: 5.9 km (3.7 mi)

Basin features
- Progression: Traun→ Alz→ Inn→ Danube→ Black Sea

Röthelbach is a small river of Bavaria, Germany. It springs southeast of Traunstein. It is a right tributary of the Traun in Traunstein.

== See also ==
- List of rivers of Bavaria
