= Kalkberg (Weismain) =

Mountain located in Franconian Alb

- Location within Bavaria

Highest point
- Elevation: 454 m (1,490 ft)
- Prominence: 18m
- Coordinates: 50°4′31″N 11°14′25″E

Geography
- Location: District of Lichtenfels, Upper Franconia, Bavaria, Germany
- Topo map: Topographische Karte; 1:25000 Weismain 5933 (Ausschnitt mit Kalkberg)

Geology
- Mountain type: Butte

Climbing
- Easiest route: from the Weismainer Kastenhof in 40 minutes

The Kalkberg is a high mountain located in the Franconian Alb near Weismain in the Upper Franconian district of Lichtenfels (Bavaria), Germany. It stands at an elevation of 454 metres (1,490 ft) above sea level.

== Geographical location and description ==
The Kalkberg rises approximately 138 metres (453 ft) above Weismain and the Weismain Valley funnel in the Weismain-Alb, which is a northern foothill of the Franconian Alb. It slopes down to the west towards the foothills of Kleinziegenfeld Valley and to the east into the Krassach Valley, which is the foothills of the Bärental Valley. The Kalkberg is about 0.7 kilometres (0.43 mi) dominant compared to the next higher mountain, the Teisenberg. The prominence between the Kalkberg and the Teisenberg has an elevation difference of 18 metres (59 ft). There is also a secondary peak that has an altitude of 450 metres (1,480 ft) above sea level. In the past, pits in the area of the two peaks indicate that lime marl was extracted to produce building lime. A mobile phone mast is located on the mountain's northeast slope.

== Geology ==
=== Brown Jurassic ===
Geologically, the mountain is composed of stratified deposits from the Brown Jurassic (Dogger) β to δ. As its name suggests, the mountain predominantly consists of brown rock and soil colors. The rock formations primarily consist of fine-grained light beige, yellow, or brown sandstone and soil-sandstone mixtures, often limonitic, with clay layers.

The upper three Brown Jurassic layers γ, δ, and ε, form an ornate clay layer about 10 m thick, rising from 395 to 405 metres (1,296 to 1,329 ft) above sea level. This layer is visible as a gently rising terrace-like slope, typically 20 to 100 metres (66 to 328 ft) wide, with a distinct upper edge separating it from the iron sandstone and the steeply rising White Jurassic formations. Due to the extensive afforestation of this area, it no longer stands out as prominently as it did in past centuries, when it was consisted primarily of fields and meadows. The ornate clay layer appears gray and contains numerous limestone shards from the overlying rock. Due to limited exposure, the tripartite division of the layer can only be discerned occasionally. The lower gamma layer, about two to three meters thick, consists of calcareous sandstone beds and clay interbedded with sand lenses. The middle delta layer, two to four meters thick, is composed of iron-oolite limestones, which are relatively hard limestone balls with brown rind and bluish core. After frost weathering, they are typically only present as fragments. The remaining Brown Jurassic-ε layer, nearly ten meters thick, emerges as light gray, stiffly plastic, calcareous clay. In its unweather state, below the ground surface, it has a semi-solid to solid consistency and contains fossil-rich layers. All three layers are characterized by the presence of large brown iron ooids, which are visible to the naked eye. The youngest layer of the Brown Jurassic, ζ, either did not deposit in the whole Upper Main area or exists only in very small remnants.

=== White Jurassic ===
The upper layers of the Kalkberg, as well as its two peaks, represent White Jurassic reefs. The lowest two White Jurassic levels α and β form a uniform stock of approximately 25 metres (82 ft) in thickness throughout the Weismain area, including the Kalkberg. However, these layers are composed of different types of rock. The Alpha Formation, also known as Lower Marl Limestone, consists mainly of marls. On the other hand, the Beta Formation is composed of fine-grained, smooth-crushed bench limestone. It is rich in fossils such as ammonites, belemnites, thin-shelled bivalves, and calcite crystals that have formed within cavities. The common name Werkkalk 'factory limestone' used for this layer is misleading in the upper main area since the bank limestones found there are not frost-resistant and therefore not suitable as a material. At the Kalkberg, the alpha and beta levels are located at an altitude of 405 to 430 metres (1,329 to 1,411 ft) above sea level. At the boundaries of the layer, the iron layer silicate glauconite also occurs. Furthermore, the layer is abundant in calcite crystals.

Above the β stage, which is already becoming more flat but still easily distinguishable, the White Jurassic γ layer begins from 430 metres (1,410 ft) above sea level. This layer is also referred to as Upper Marl Limestone and consists of clayey marl. It exhibits a gentle to moderate slope. Occasionally, larger limestone layers can be found within this formation.

== Flora and fauna ==
=== Flora ===
At Kalkberg, two distinct vegetation areas can be observed. The lower elevations are predominantly covered by forests, with the species diversity influenced by the sandy soils of the brown Jurassic rocks of the Dogger β to ε. From an altitude of about 395 metres (1,296 ft) above sea level, the geological composition of the mountain also changes the vegetation, which is now dominated by the calcareous soils of the White Jurassic α and β rocks.

The slopes of the limestone mountain feature mixed forest areas, fields, and meadows. The forests are characterized by tree species such as spruce, Scots pine, oak, linden, and common beech. Along the forest edges and waysides, there are also diverse woody plants with black elder, red dogwood, hazelnut, bird cherry, hawthorn, blackthorn, quaking poplar, crab apple, wild pear, various species of rowan, common whitebeam, and wild service tree, wild gooseberry, and red honeysuckle. Non-woody plants in the shrub and herb layer include ivy, clematis, cynomolgus, wood avens, euonymus, corydalis, liverwort, windflower, wood anemone, wood sorrel, hazelwort, viburnum opulus and viburnum lantana, garlic mustard, golden dead-nettle, and celandine. As the elevation increases and the soils become more calcareous, hornbeam and field maple become more prevalent.

On the sparsely vegetated summits of Kalkberg, where calcareous soils dominate, larger plants are less common. However, sporadic growth of Scots pines, common juniper, and hackberry can be observed in the extensive areas of rough grassland. These grasslands are characterized by wildflowers such as calcareous aster, silver thistle, thyme, oregano, German fringed gentian as well as another species of gentian, golden thistle, bear's pod, St. John's wort, and golden-aster. Another rather rare species that thrives on the mountain is Prunella vulgaris (Prunella x spuria), which is a hybrid of the parent plant Prunella grandiflora.

=== Fauna ===
The fauna in the vicinity of Kalkberg is similar to other areas with mixed forest and open spaces in the Franconian Alb. It supports a diverse range of species, including insects, vertebrates, small mammals, songbirds, and birds of prey, as well as larger mammals such as red deer and wild boar. Certain habitats on Kalkberg are of particular importance for specific species. For instance, the "bat cellar" ("Fledermauskeller") mentioned in the nature trail section provides shelter and refuge for native bat species. The reading stone bars and dry-stone walls also serve as valuable habitats, supporting various amphibians, insects, and the mouse weasel. Notably, the summit area is home to the common tiger beetle, a species that is endangered and facing extinction in Germany.

== Landscape conservation ==
The Kalkberg is located entirely within the multi-part Fauna-Flora Habitat (FFH) area of dry grasslands, meadows, and forests around Weismain (FFH No. 5933-371). It is also located in the northern part of the 1,021.64 km^{2} (394.46 sq mi) landscape conservation area of the Franconian Switzerland-Veldenstein Forest Nature Park (LSG No. 322697), which was established in 2001. These designations contribute to the protection of the Kalkberg as a natural and biodiversity-rich area.

The preservation of insects and plants at the Kalkberg is closely linked to the traditional practice of grazing in the meadows with sheep. To ensure the grazing of the meadows in this traditional form, the landscape conservation association of the district of Lichtenfels has been actively involved for over 15 years in uncovering old sheep herds and creating driving paths. Approximately 600 sheep and goats from the Roß sheep farm in Middle Franconia are used for grazing purposes. The Landscape Management Association of the Lichtenfels district is responsible for the conservation of these old sheep herds.

In 2010, the existing dry grassland areas were further enhanced through landscape management measures implemented by the Landscape Conservation Association of the Lichtenfels district. These measures included enlarging the grassland areas, which significantly improved the habitat for endangered species and contributed to their conservation.

== Nature trail Kalkberg ==
In the mid-2000s, the Kalkberg nature trail was built by the Environmental Station of the Lichtenfels district. It is a circular hiking trail approximately 3.6 km long and designed as a nature trail that offers visitors an opportunity to explore and learn about the natural features of the area. The trail has a walking time of about 40 minutes. The path leads from the office of the Environmental Station in the Weismainer Kastenhof and follows a right-turning route over the Kalkberg and through the historic town center of Weismain before returning to the Kastenhof. Occasionally, guided hikes lasting 2 to 3 hours are offered along the trail. The natural trail consists of 16 stations, each providing information and insights about various aspects of the surroundings.
