= Zipser Berg =

Hill in Bavaria, Germany

- Location within Bavaria

Highest point
- Elevation: 552 m (1,811 ft)
- Coordinates: 49°45′51″N 11°34′46″E

Geography
- Location: Bavaria, Germany

The Zipser Berg is a hill in the Franconian Jura in the German state of Bavaria.
