= Inzell =

Place in Bavaria, Germany

- Municipality
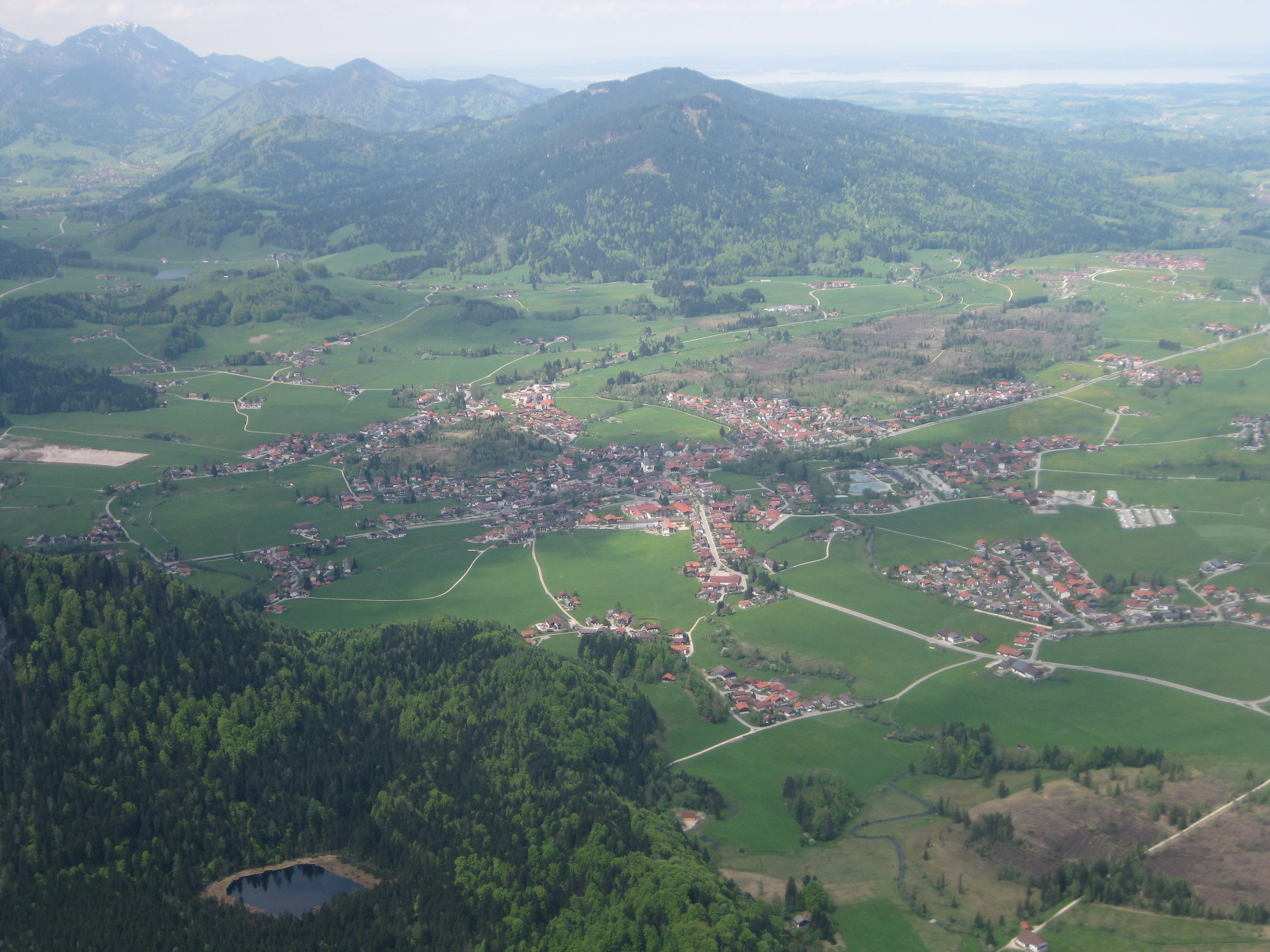
- Inzell from the southeast

- Coat of arms

- Location of Inzell within Traunstein district
- Interactive map of Inzell
- Location within Germany Location within Bavaria
- Coordinates: 47°45′45″N 12°44′57″E
- Country: Germany
- State: Bavaria
- Admin. region: Oberbayern
- District: Traunstein

Government
  - Mayor (2024–30): Michael Lorenz (CSU)

Area
  - Total: 45.35 km^{2} (17.51 sq mi)
- Elevation: 693 m (2,274 ft)

Population (2025-12-31)
  - Total: 4,668
  - Density: 102.9/km^{2} (266.6/sq mi)
- Time zone: UTC+01:00 (CET)
  - Summer (DST): UTC+02:00 (CEST)
- Postal codes: 83334
- Dialling codes: 08665
- Vehicle registration: TS
- Website: www.inzell.de

Inzell (German pronunciation: [ˈɪntsɛl]) is a municipality in the district of Traunstein in Bavaria, Germany. It is known for the Eisstadion Inzell, a former outdoor artificial ice rink that has been used for many international speed skating championships. It is now an indoor oval.

== Geography ==
Inzell lies in a wide valley floor in the Chiemgau Alps, framed by the mountains of Rauschberg, Zinnkopf, Teisenberg and the massif of Staufen. In the municipality, the confluence of the Großwaldbach and Falkenseebach rivers forms the Rote Traun river. Inzell is also known as the gateway to Berchtesgaden National Park due to the Zwing, a mountain passage between Inzell and Weißbach, which separates the Chiemgau from Berchtesgaden.

== History ==
Historical population
Year	Pop.	±%
1840	980	—
1871	936	−4.5%
1900	1,060	+13.2%
1925	1,464	+38.1%
1939	1,671	+14.1%
1950	2,413	+44.4%
1961	2,315	−4.1%
1970	3,007	+29.9%
1987	3,736	+24.2%
2009	4,483	+20.0%
2013	4,527	+1.0%

The independent municipality of Inzell was created in 1818 as a result of administrative reform in Bavaria. The mining and smelting of ores was an important source of income in the village, as can still be seen in the coat of arms (above right).

== Transport ==
From Inzell runs the Federal Highway 306 and as part of the German Alpine Road, the Federal Highway 305. The nearest motorway is Federal Motorway 8 near Siegsdorf.

== Economy and infrastructure ==
In 2009 there were, according to official statistics, 872 social insurance employed persons, including 268 in the manufacturing sector, 308 in trade and transport, and 296 in other economic sectors (agriculture and services). In the manufacturing sector, there were 13 construction companies. In addition, in 2007 there were 71 farms with an agricultural area of at least 2 ha (4.9 acres).

=== Sports ===
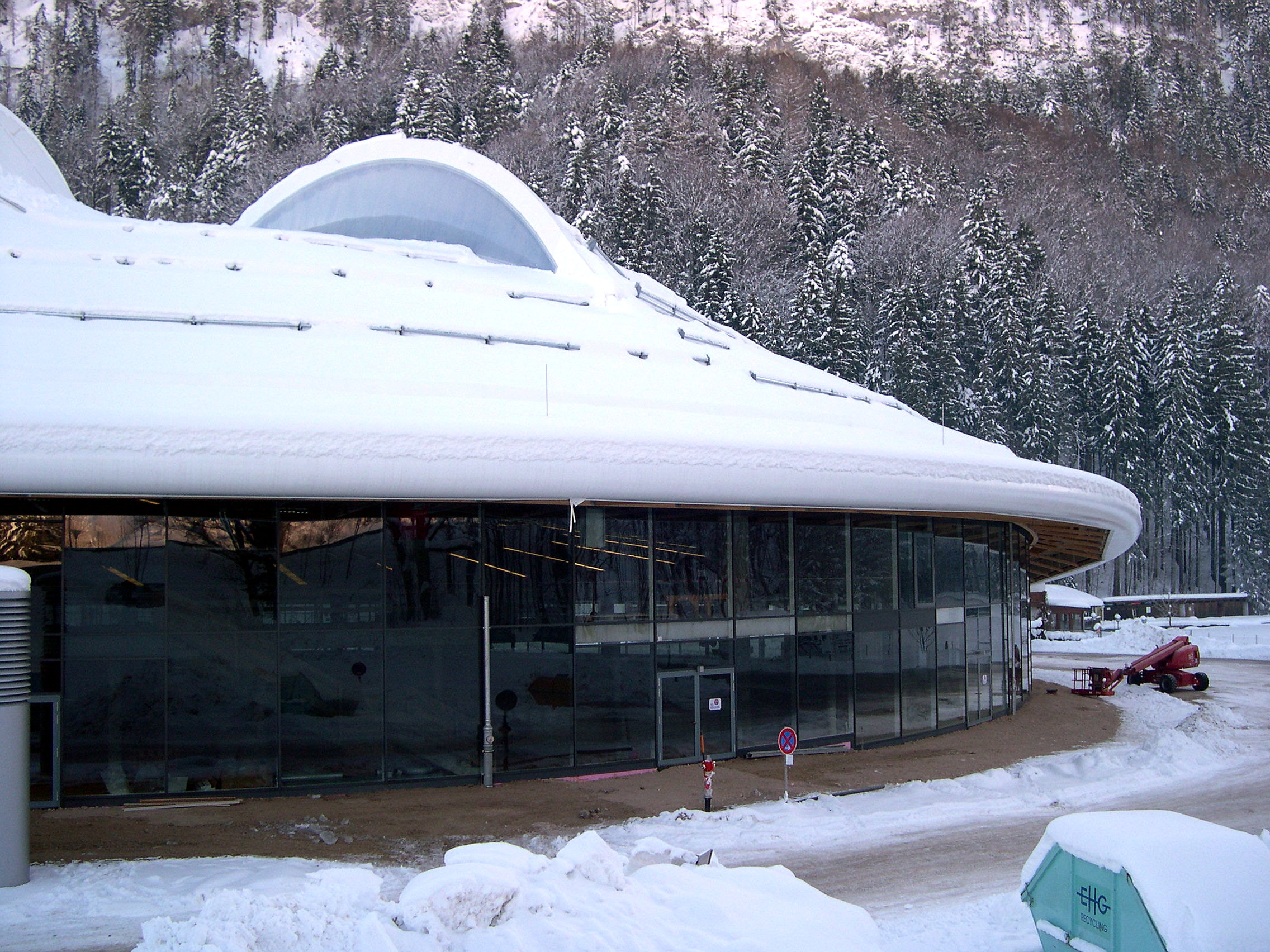
The new indoor speed skating arena, Eisstadion Inzell

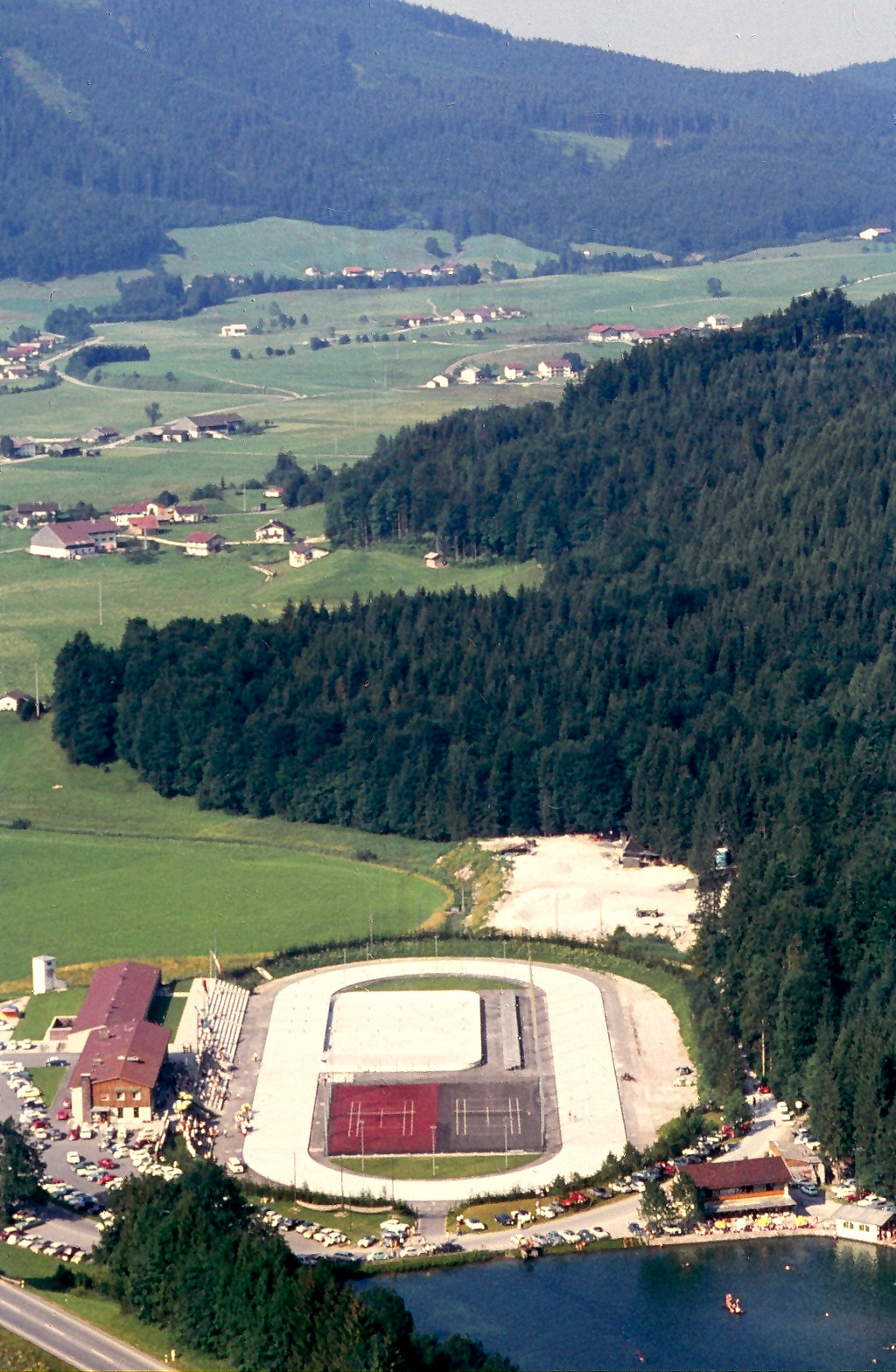
Inzell's former outdoor ice rink (c. 1963)

In the winter of 1959/1960 an ice- and speed-skating competition was held on the Frillensee near Inzell. From 1963 to 1965 the Ludwig Schwabl Stadium was built. In 1974, the world skating championships were held in Inzell, won by Norwegian Sten Stensen. In 1986 and 1996, the world skating championships were again held in Inzell.

In May 2009, after a long debate with the German Speed Skating Association, the Bavarian government and the municipality of Inzell, it was decided to build a roof over the ice rink. The work was started in 2009 and completed in 2010. The covering was important to continue accommodating large skating events, such as the ISU Speed Skating World Cup in March 2011 and other national and international competitions. After the roof was finished, the Ludwig Schwabl Stadion was renamed the Max Aicher Arena.

== Education ==
The following educational institutions are located in Inzell:

- St. Michael Catholic Kindergarten
- Elementary school (elementary school) with 186 students in 11 classes (2010/11). The students of the 7th and 9th secondary school class attend school in Ruhpolding.
- Cajetan-Adlgasser Music School, since 1969
- Kritische Akademie, an educational institution of the IG Metall

== Notable people ==
- Anton Cajetan Adlgasser (1729–1777), Director of Music in Salzburg
- Johannes M. Hoeck (1902–1995), Benedictine abbot of Ettal and Scheyern, a Council Father
- Michael Hoeck (1903–1996), clergyman
- Ludwig Schwabl (1921–2007), Bavarian SPD member of parliament
- Robert Hültner (born 1950), mystery writer
- Regine Mösenlechner (born 1961), alpine skier
- Thomas Dufter (born 1966), a Nordic combined skier
- Anni Friesinger-Postma (born 1977), speed skater
