= Franconian Switzerland–Veldenstein Forest Nature Park =

Franconian Switzerland-Veldenstein Forest Nature Park
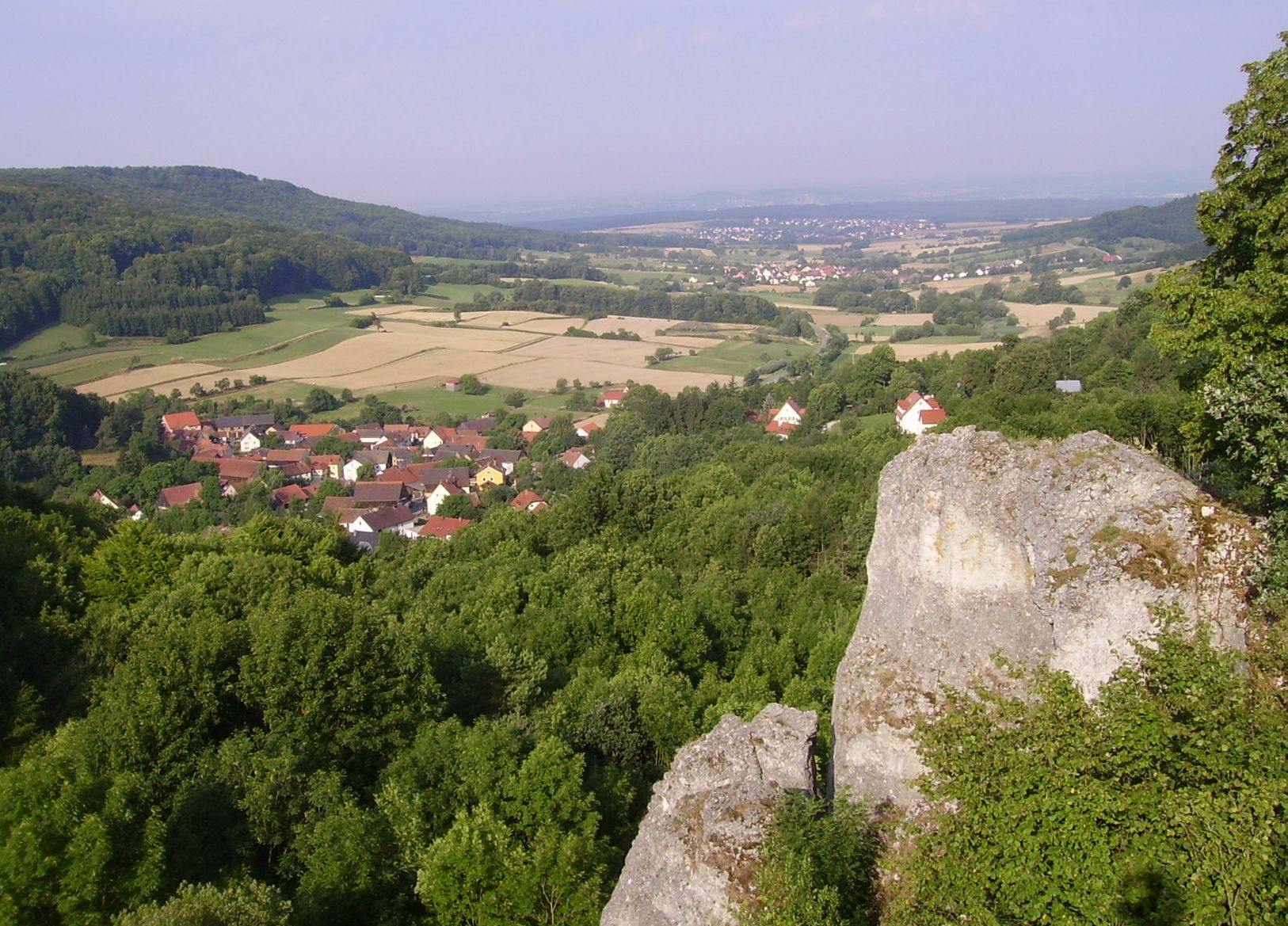

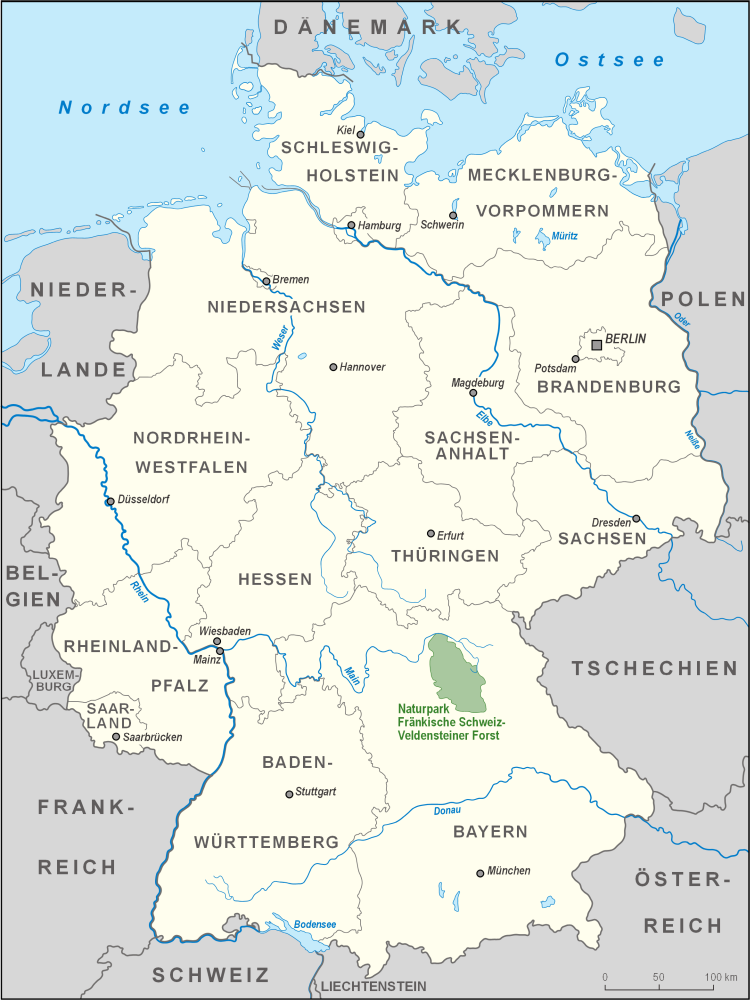
- Location in Germany
- Location: Upper Franconia, Middle Franconia, Upper Palatinate
- Coordinates: 49.76931°N 11.40676°E
- Area: 2,335.44 km^{2} (901.72 sq mi)
- Designation: NP-00009
- Established: 1995
- Administrator: Verein Naturpark Fränkische Schweiz-Veldensteiner Forst e.V.
- Website: Development of the nature park

Franconian Switzerland–Veldenstein Forest Nature Park (German: Naturpark Fränkische Schweiz – Veldensteiner Forst) is a nature park in North Bavaria. The nature park was established in 1995 and it covers an area that is almost coextensive with the natural region major unit of Northern Franconian Jura, the park being slightly larger.

With an area of 2,346 km^{2} (906 sq mi) it is the second largest nature park in Bavaria after the Altmühl Valley Nature Park. The park's sponsors are the Franconian Switzerland–Veldenstein Forest Nature Park Society (Verein Naturpark Fränkische Schweiz – Veldensteiner Forst), founded in 1968, with its head office in Pottenstein.

The park covers much of the regions of Franconian Switzerland and the Veldenstein Forest from which it derives its name.

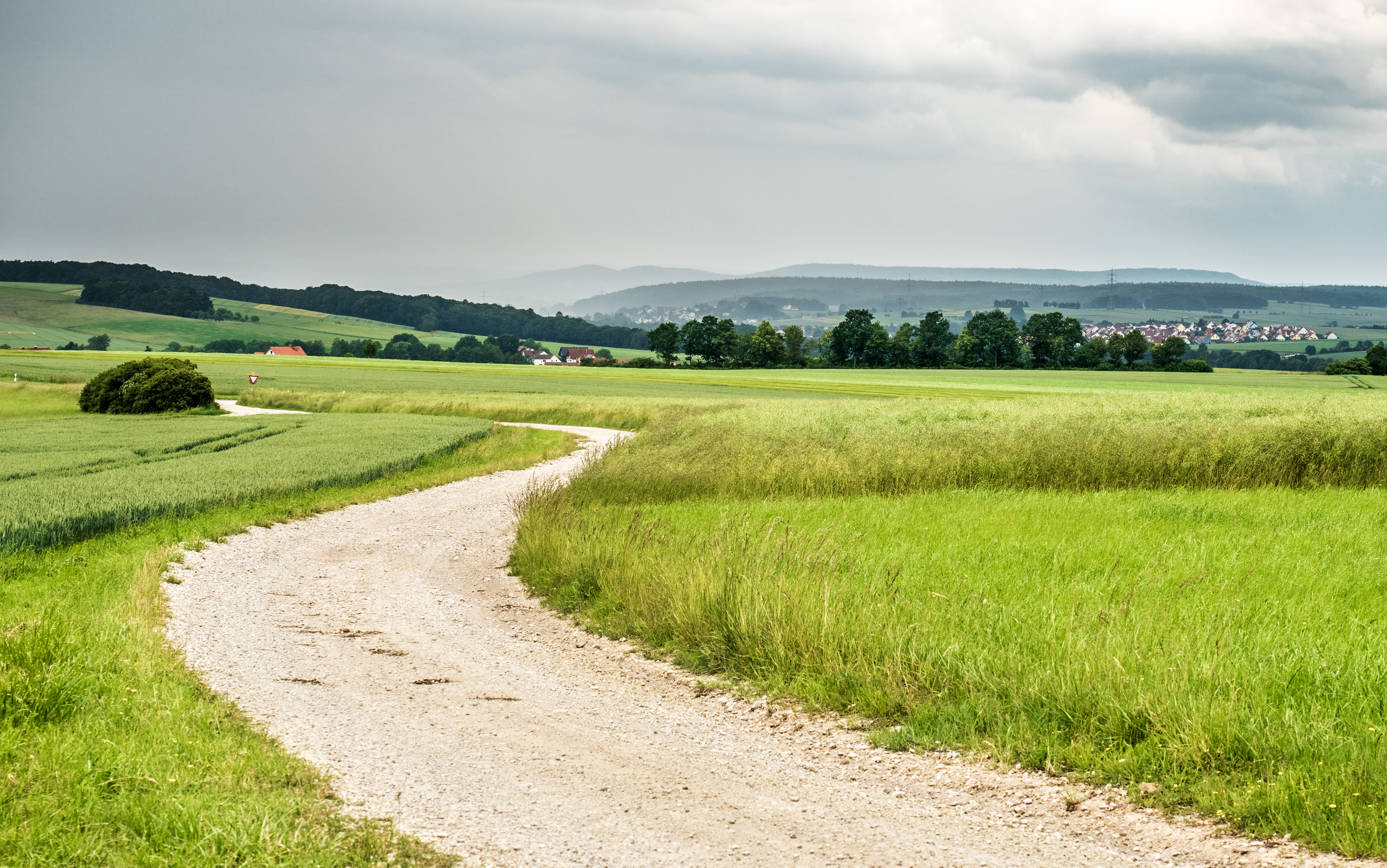
Cultural landscape

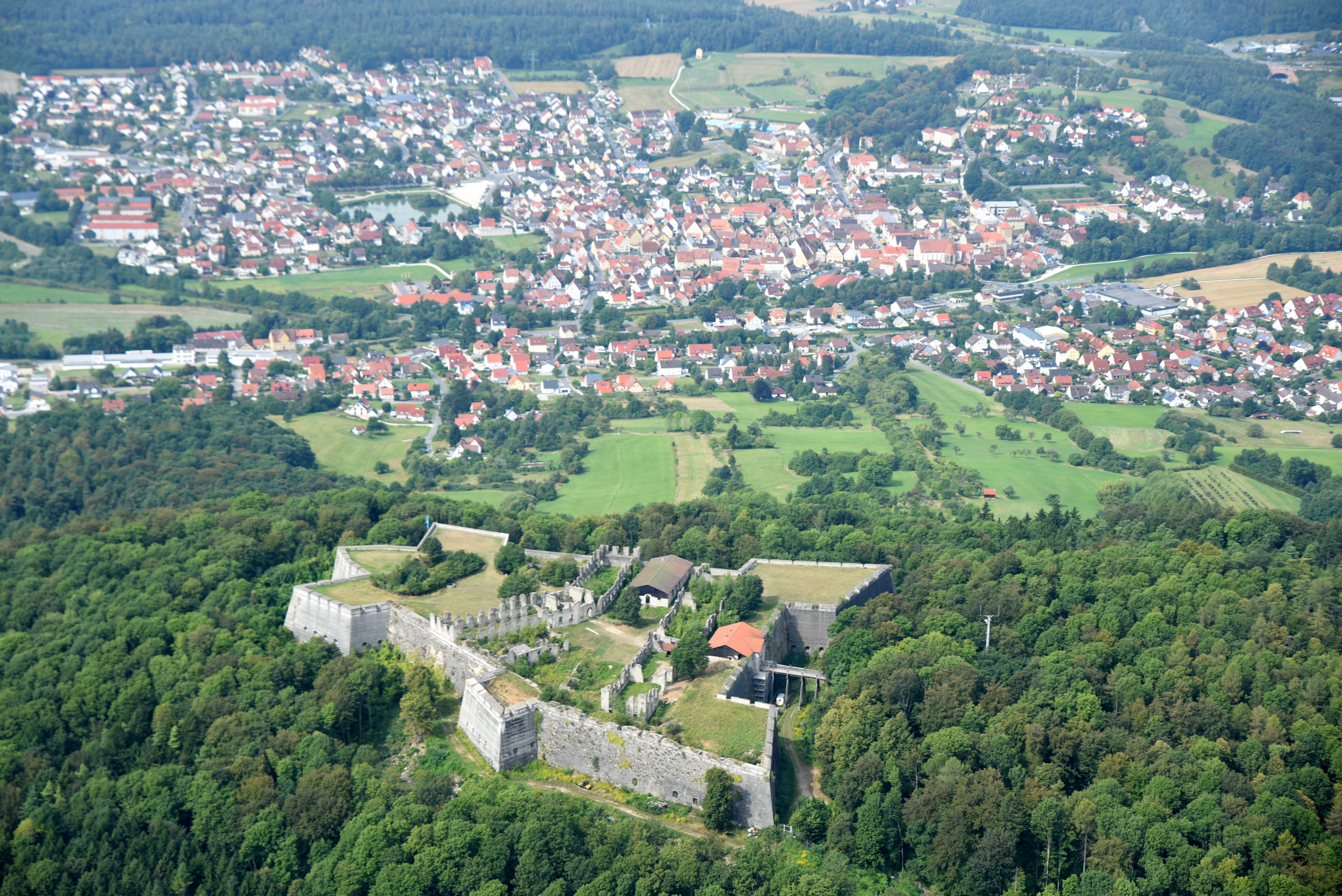
Festung Rothenberg

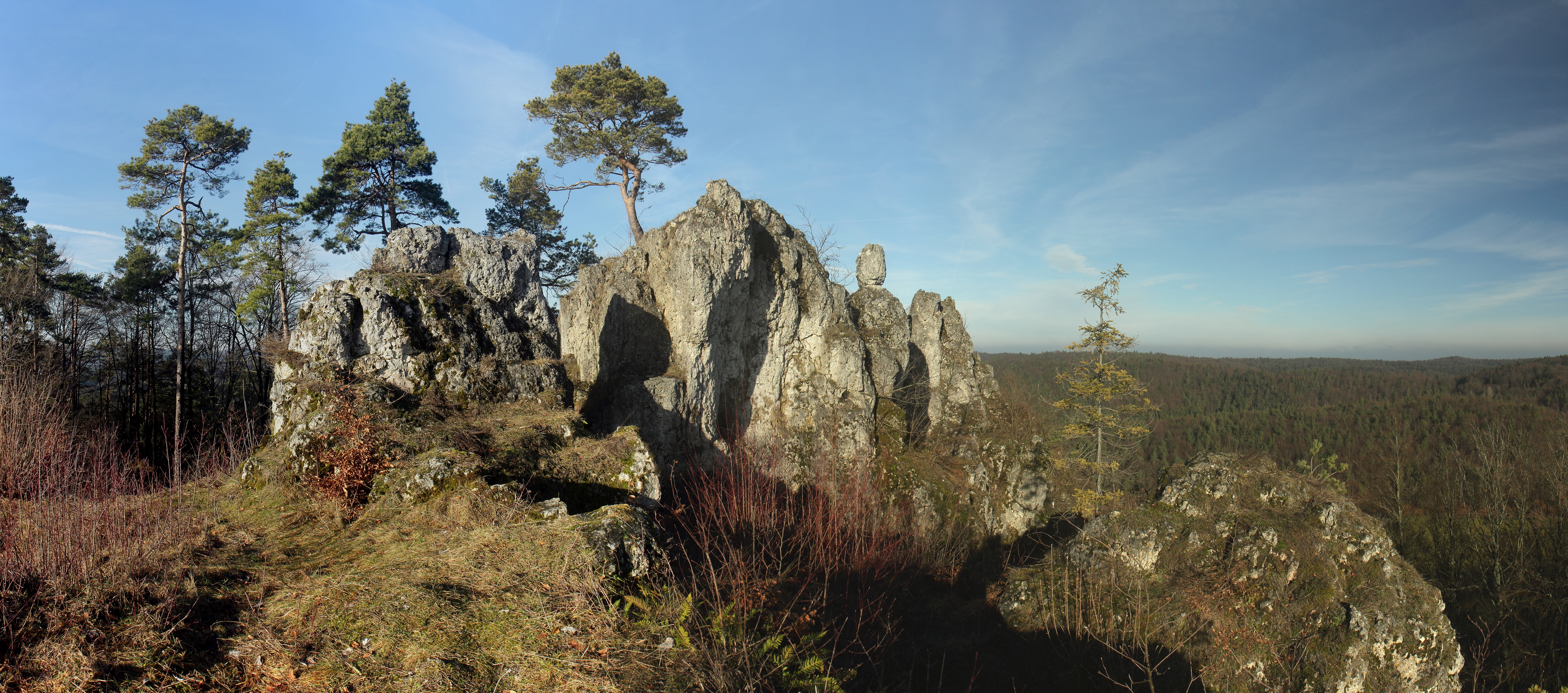

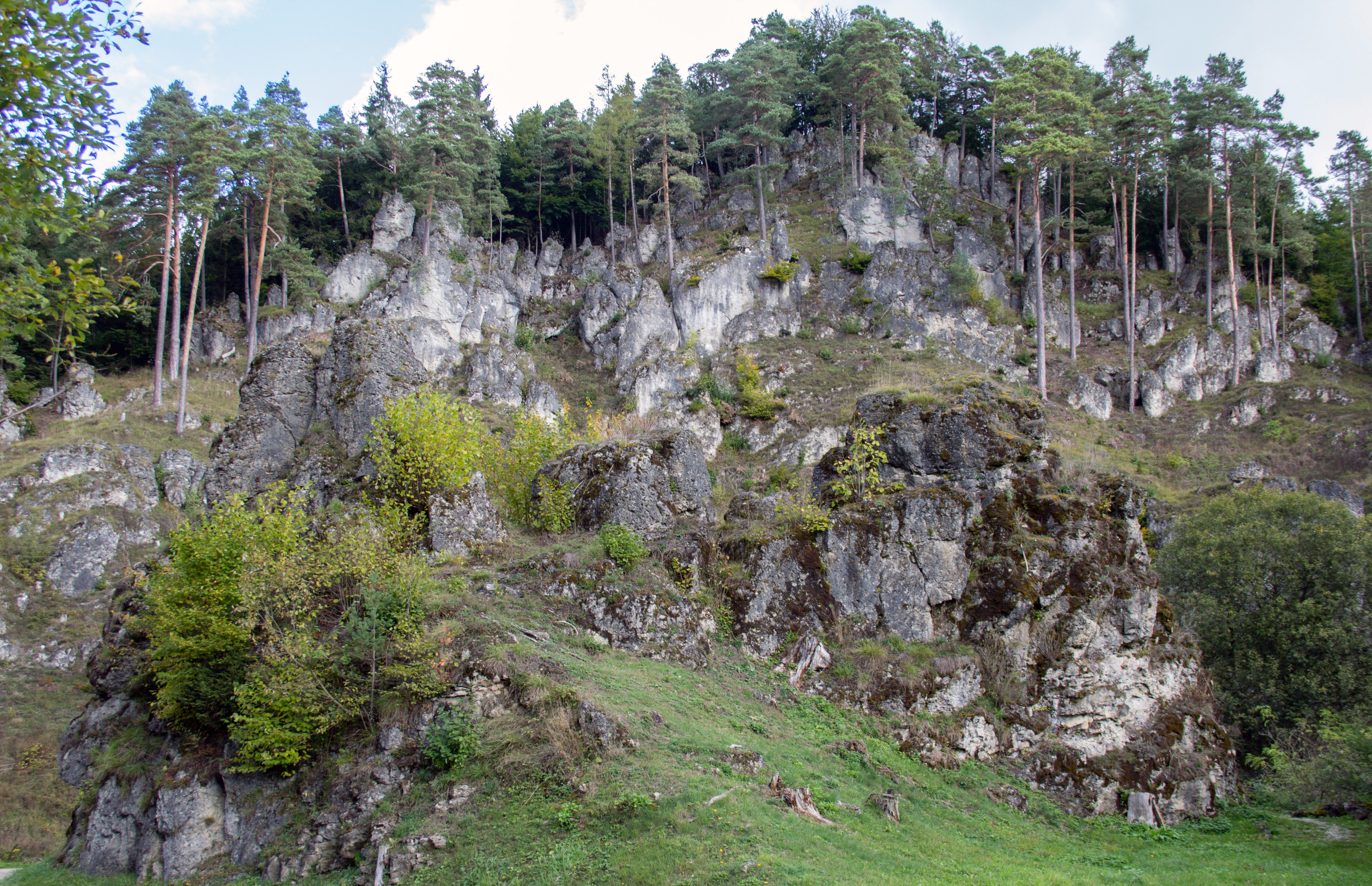

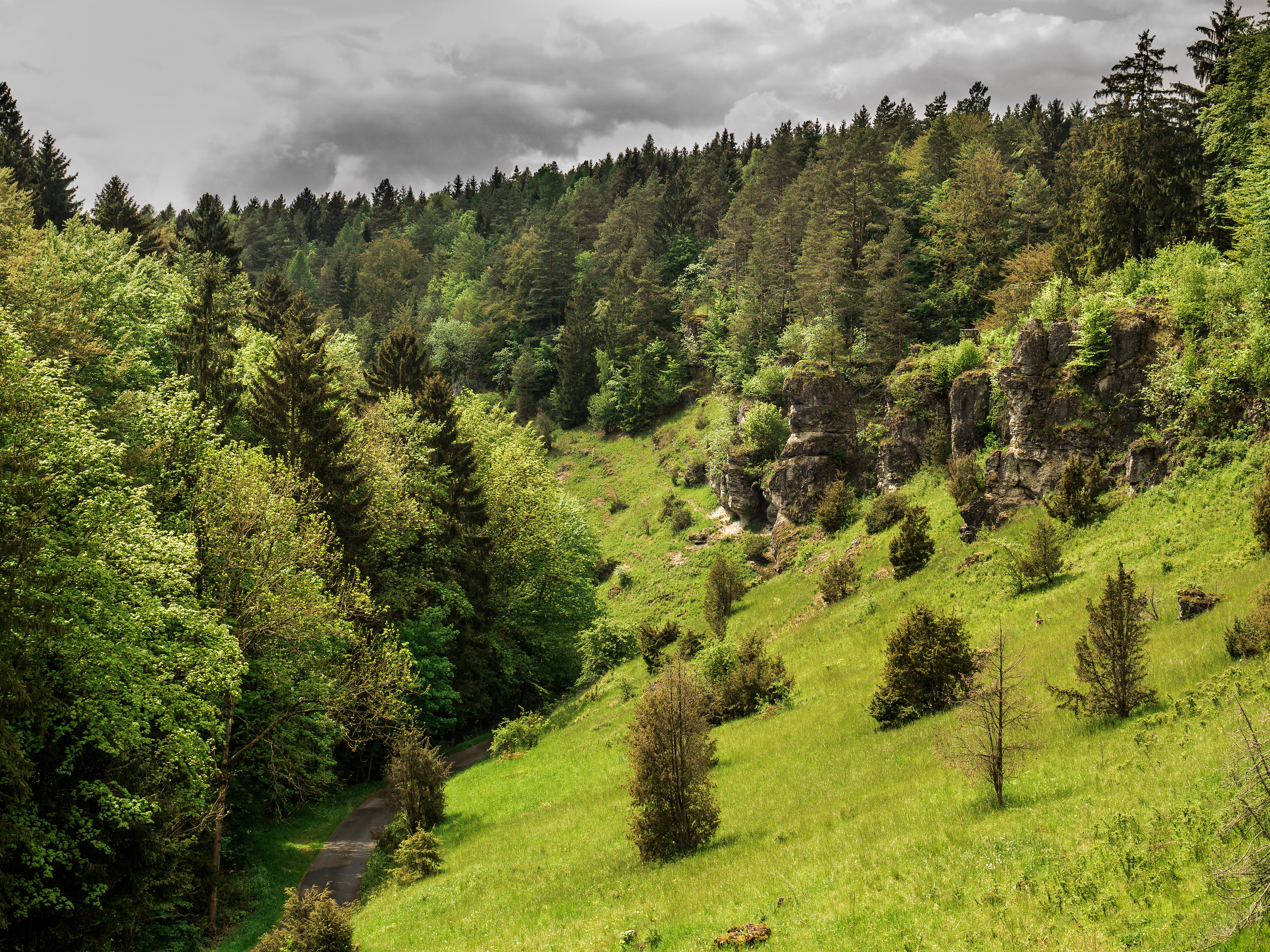

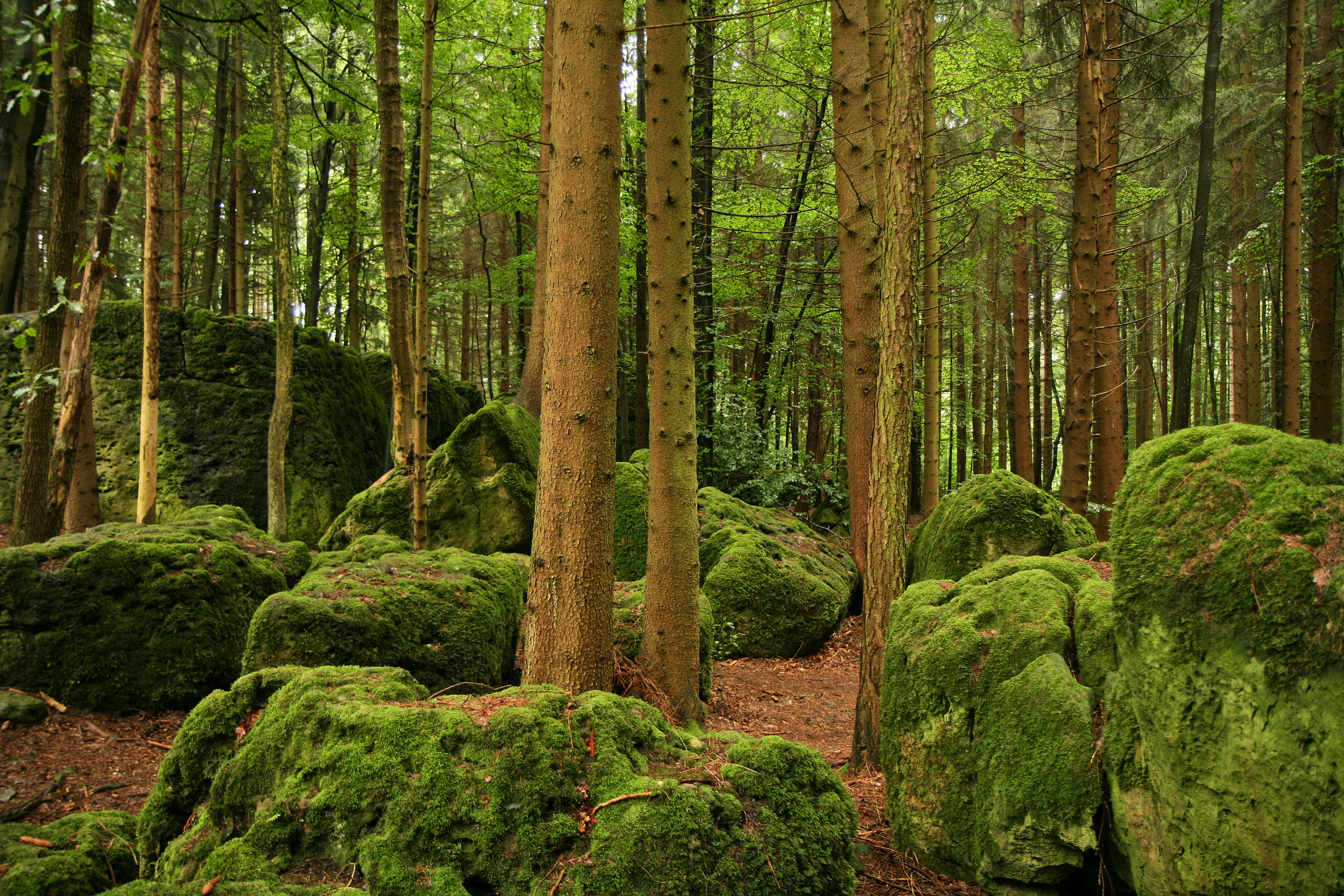
Druidenhain

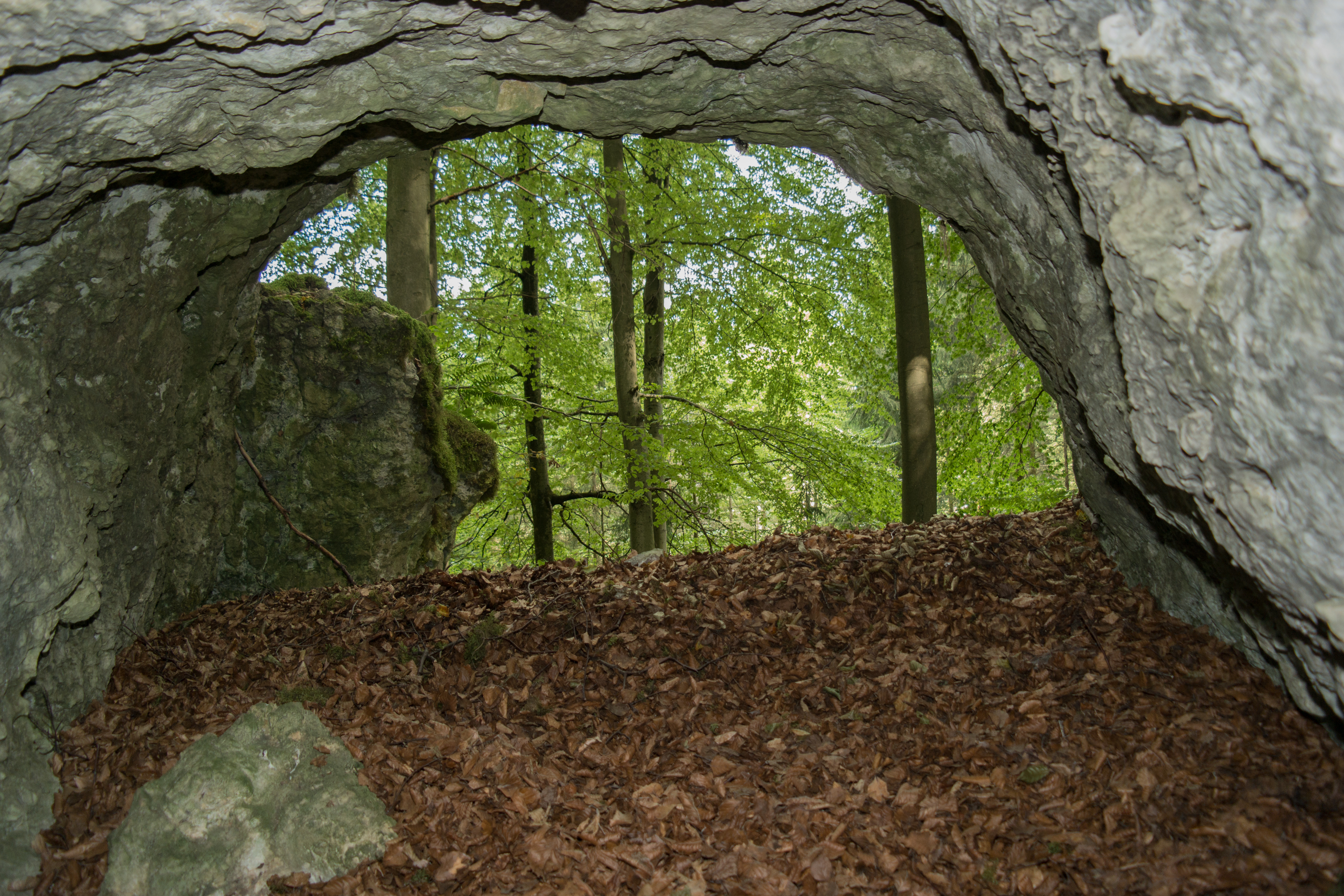
Cave-systems

== See also ==
- List of nature parks in Germany
- Kalkberg (Weismain)
