= Burgkirchen an der Alz =

Burgkirchen a.d.Alz
- Municipality
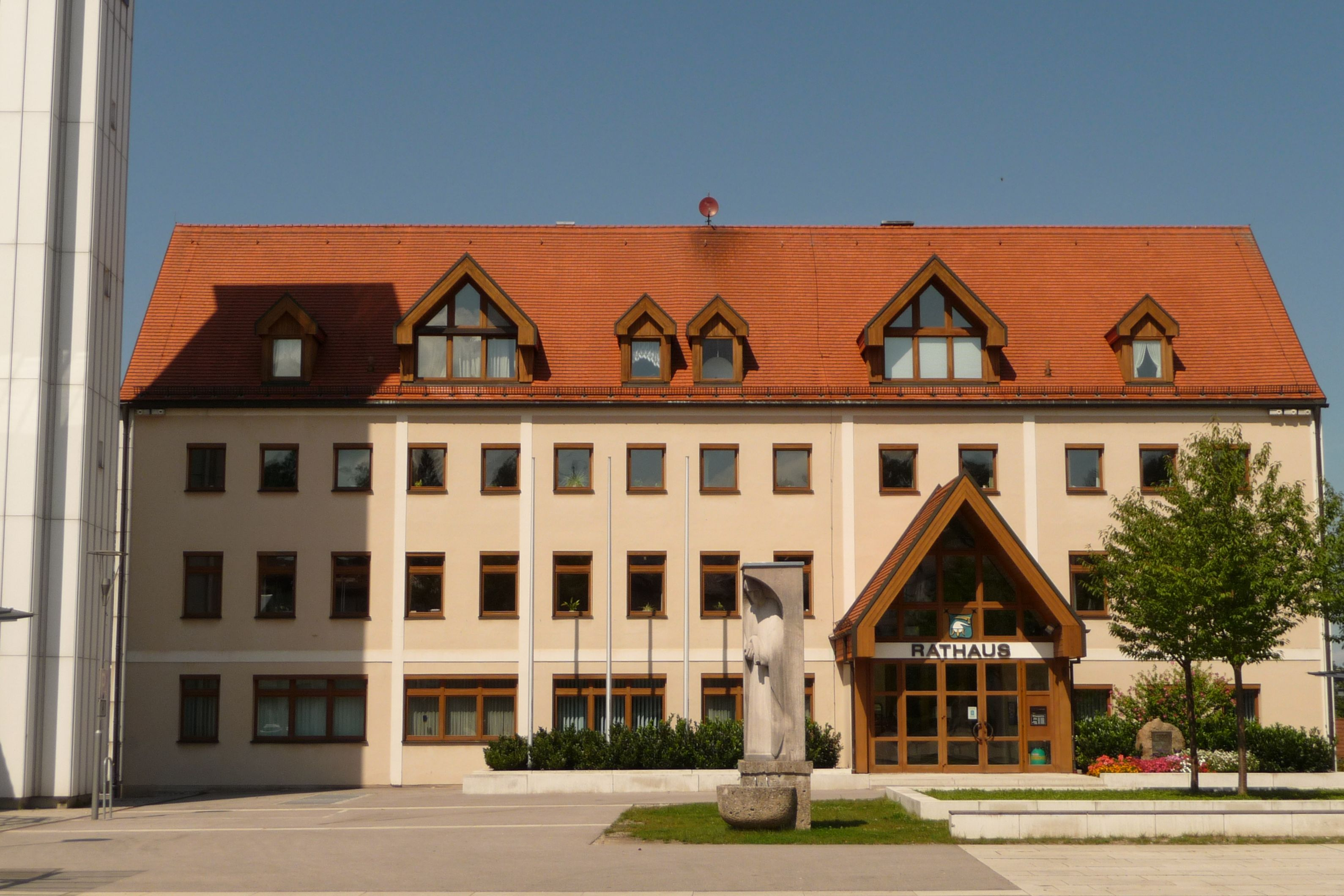
- Town hall

- Coat of arms

- Location of Burgkirchen a.d.Alz within Altötting district
- Interactive map of Burgkirchen a.d.Alz
- Location within Germany Location within Bavaria
- Coordinates: 48°10′N 12°43′E
- Country: Germany
- State: Bavaria
- Admin. region: Oberbayern
- District: Altötting

Government
  - Mayor (2020–26): Johann Krichenbauer (FW)

Area
  - Total: 46.19 km^{2} (17.83 sq mi)
- Elevation: 391–530 m (1,283–1,739 ft)

Population (2025-12-31)
  - Total: 10,963
  - Density: 237.3/km^{2} (614.7/sq mi)
- Time zone: UTC+01:00 (CET)
  - Summer (DST): UTC+02:00 (CEST)
- Postal codes: 84508
- Dialling codes: 08679
- Vehicle registration: AÖ
- Website: www.burgkirchen.de

Burgkirchen an der Alz (German pronunciation: [bʊʁkˈkɪʁçn̩ ʔan deːɐ̯ ˈʔalts], lit. 'Burgkirchen on the Alz') is a municipality in the district of Altötting, in Bavaria, Germany. It is situated on the river Alz, 8 km west of Burghausen.
