= Weißbach (Schneizlreuth) =

River in Germany

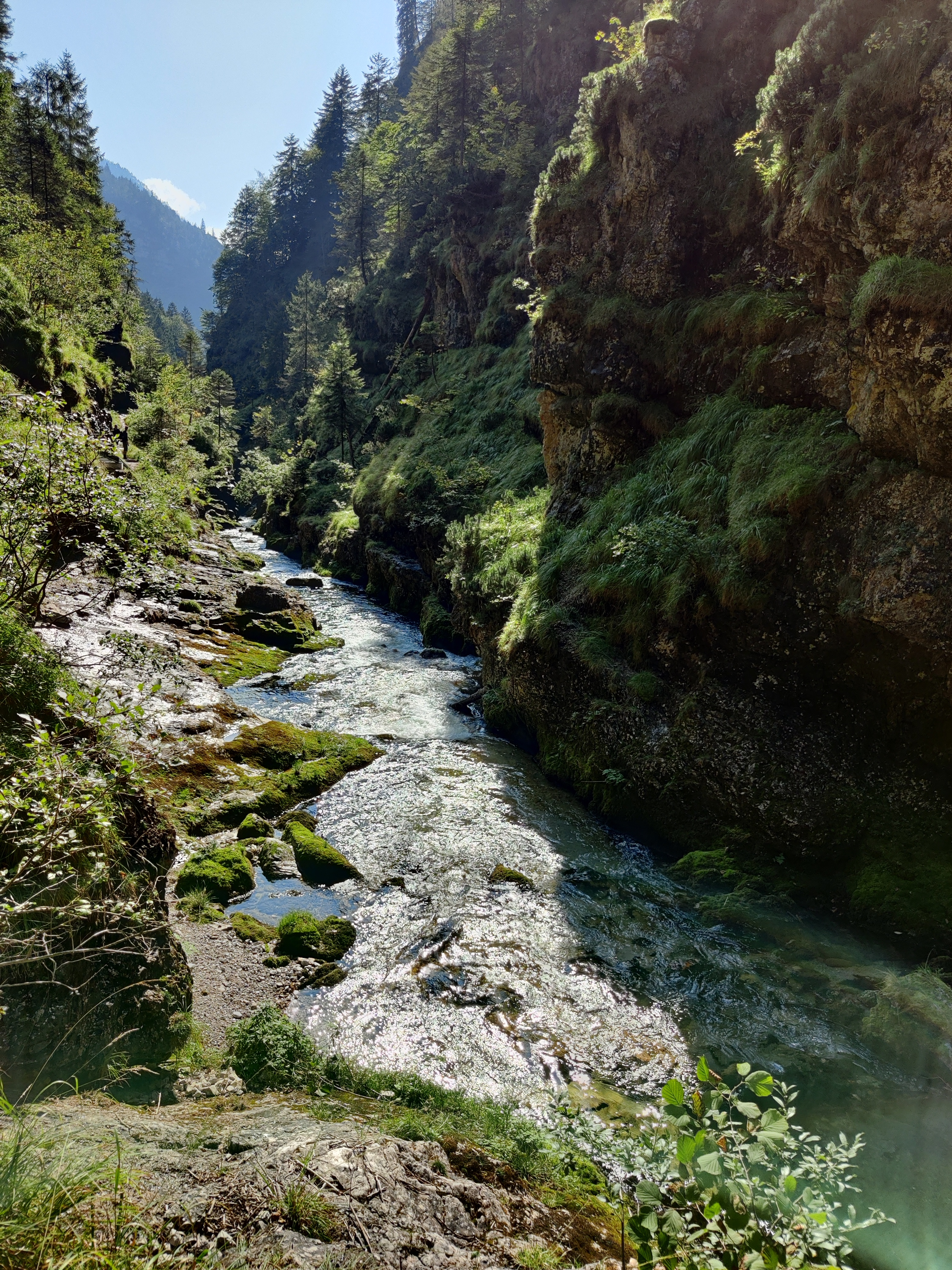
- The Weißbach gorge

Location
- Country: Germany
- State: Bavaria

Physical characteristics
- Mouth
  - location: Saalach
  - coordinates: 47.6884°N 12.8022°E
- Length: 8.6 km (5.3 mi)

Basin features
- Progression: Saalach→ Salzach→ Inn→ Danube→ Black Sea

Weißbach is a river of Bavaria, Germany. It is a left tributary of the Saalach. It flows in the areas of the municipalities Inzell and Schneizlreuth.

== See also ==
- List of rivers of Bavaria
