= Frillensee =

Lake in Bavaria, Germany

Coordinates: 47°45′57″N 12°49′02″E

- Interactive map of Frillensee
- Location: Inzell, Bavaria, Germany
- Type: Glacial lake
- Max. length: 280 m (920 ft)
- Max. width: 165 m (541 ft)
- Surface area: 4.30 ha (10.6 acres)
- Average depth: 7.50 m (24.6 ft)
- Surface elevation: 922–923 m (3,025–3,028 ft)

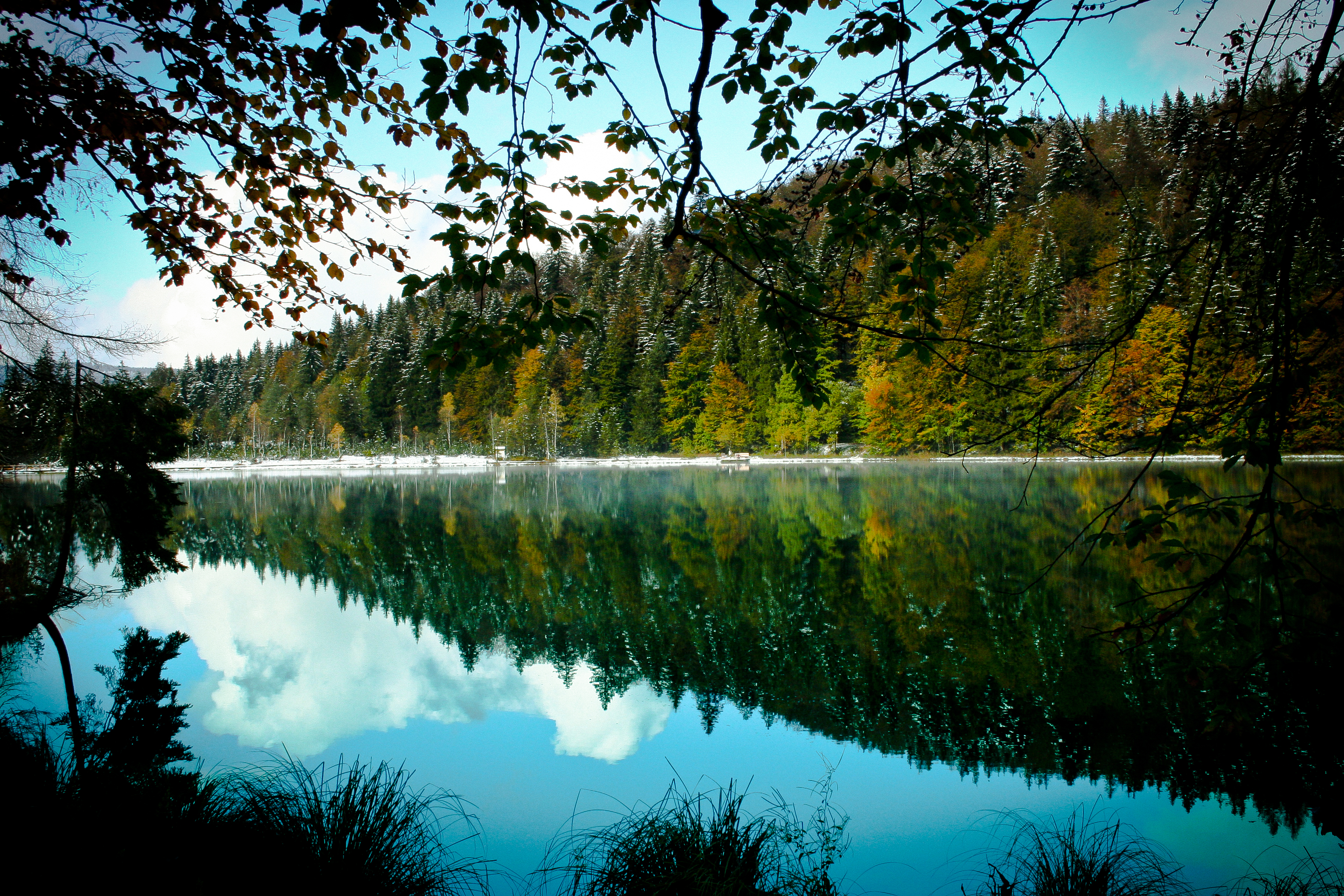
Frillensee in 2012

Frillensee is a lake near Inzell in the Chiemgau Alps of Bavaria, Germany. It lies at an elevation of about 922–923 metres and is regarded as the coldest lake in Germany and one of the coldest lakes in Central Europe. The lake covers 4.30 hectares and is about 280 metres long and 165 metres wide.

The lake is a remnant of the last Ice Age. It is surrounded by mountains including the Hochstaufen, Zwiesel and Gamsknogel. Its surroundings are protected as a landscape, and the northern shore contains a raised bog with diverse vegetation. The lake is also notable for its early ice formation; the ice can become stable as early as November.

Nowadays, Frillensee is used primarily as a destination for walking and recreation. It can be reached on foot from the car park at the Adlgaß forester's lodge, with the walk taking about 45 minutes. Swimming is not permitted.

== Speed skating ==
Frillensee became associated with speed skating in the late 1950s. In 1959, the German Ice Sports Association inspected the lake as a possible training and competition centre. Its clear ice, often around 20 centimetres thick, and cold conditions made it suitable for ice sports, although heavy snowfall and severe winter weather presented major difficulties.

The first training course for German elite speed skaters took place at Frillensee in December 1959. On 23–24 January 1960, the Bavarian and German Speed Skating Championships were held there, attracting several thousand spectators. The competitions also served as qualifying events for the 1960 Winter Olympics in Squaw Valley, United States. In 1961 the speed skating club DEC Frillensee was founded and named after the lake.

The extreme winter conditions eventually ended the era of major competitions at the lake. The last German Speed Skating Championships at Frillensee were held on 26–27 January 1963. In the same year, Inzell constructed a natural-ice stadium named Ludwig-Schwabl-Stadion at Zwingsee, which was converted into an artificial-ice stadium in 1965 and became a federal performance centre. Still the lake remains closely connected with speed skating in Inzell, with the competition "Frillensee Cup" named after the lake.
