= Trostberg =

- Town
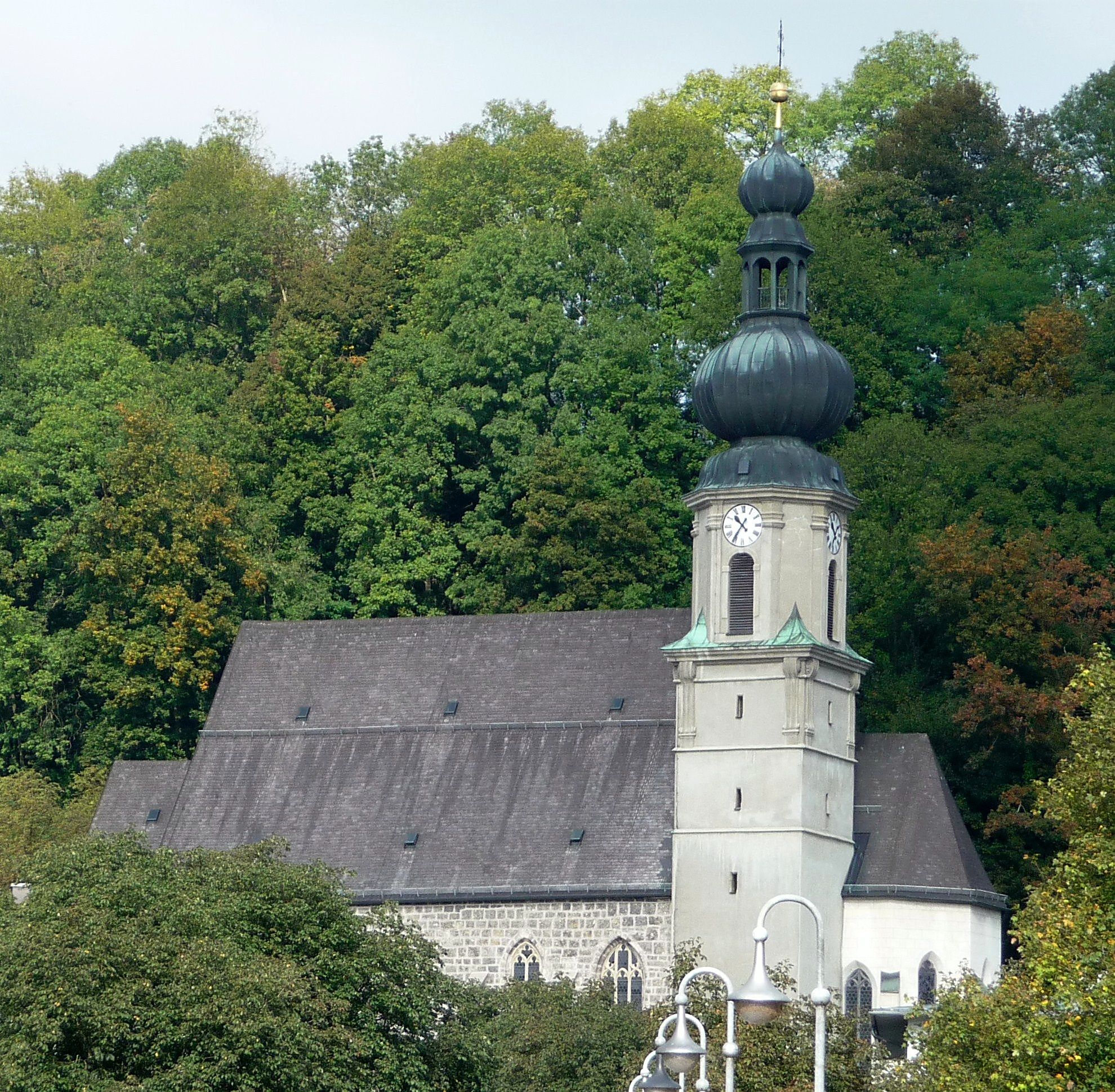
- Church of Saint Andrew

- Coat of arms

- Location of Trostberg within Traunstein district
- Interactive map of Trostberg
- Location within Germany Location within Bavaria
- Coordinates: 48°1′N 12°33′E
- Country: Germany
- State: Bavaria
- Admin. region: Oberbayern
- District: Traunstein

Government
  - Mayor (2020–26): Karl Schleid (CSU)

Area
  - Total: 51.36 km^{2} (19.83 sq mi)
- Elevation: 493 m (1,617 ft)

Population (2025-12-31)
  - Total: 11,442
  - Density: 222.8/km^{2} (577.0/sq mi)
- Time zone: UTC+01:00 (CET)
  - Summer (DST): UTC+02:00 (CEST)
- Postal codes: 83308
- Dialling codes: 08621
- Vehicle registration: TS
- Website: www.trostberg.de

Trostberg (German pronunciation: [ˈtʁoːstˌbɛʁk]]; Central Bavarian: Droschberg or Troschtberg) is a town in the district of Traunstein, in Bavaria, Germany. It is situated on the river Alz, 19 km northwest of Traunstein. As with other 'old towns' in the region, it is a popular local tourist spot.

== Economy ==
About 1,400 people are employed at the Chemiepark Trostberg, a large chemical industrial area near the town. The two main companies are AlzChem and BASF Bauchemie (construction chemistry). The Chemiepark Trostberg originated from a calcium cyanamide production plant, founded in 1908. Between 1978 and 2000, the company was called SKW Trostberg AG.

== History ==
During World War II, a subcamp of Dachau concentration camp was located in the town.
