= Altenmarkt an der Alz =

Altenmarkt a.d.Alz
- Municipality
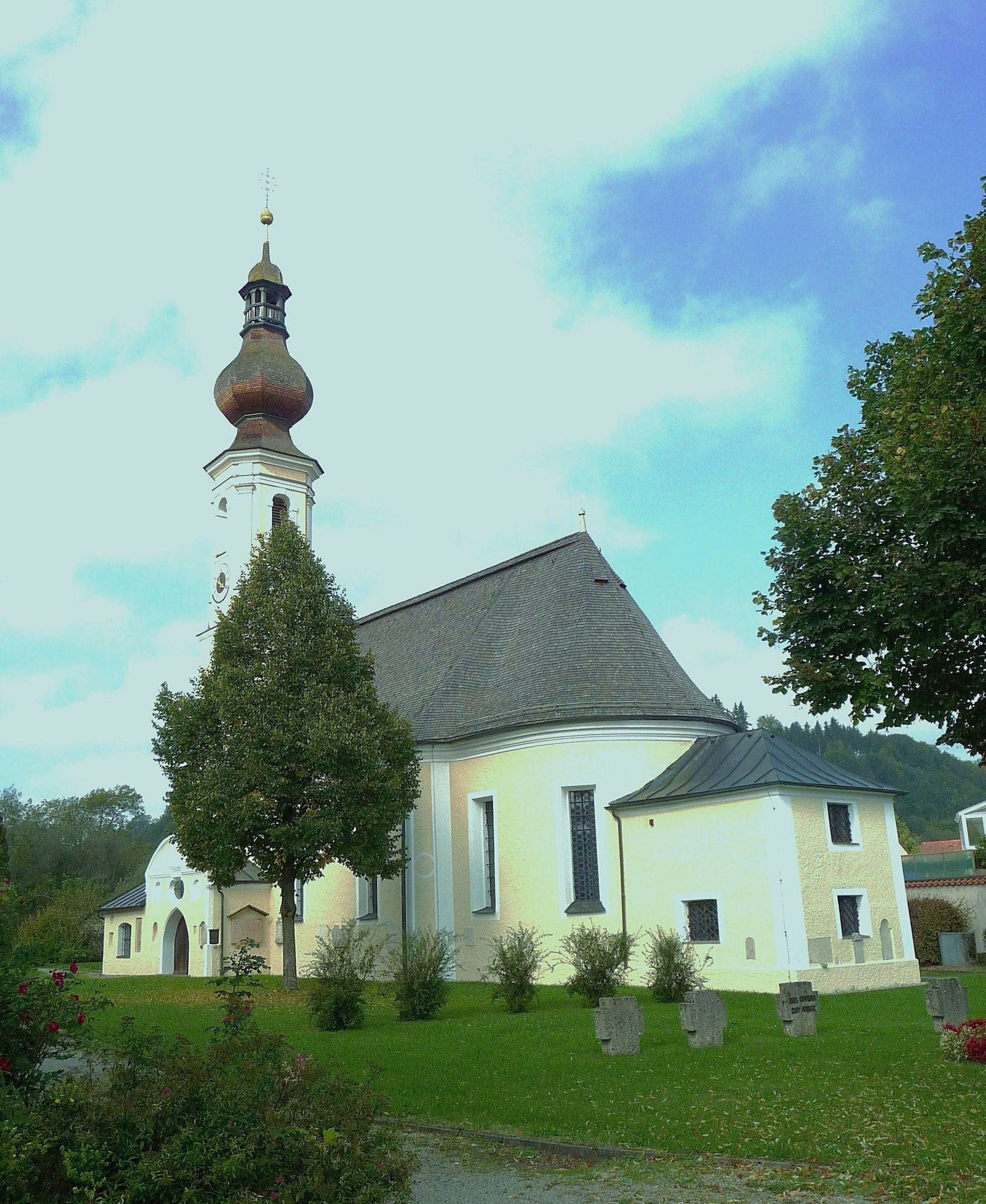
- Kirche St. Ägidius

- Coat of arms

- Location of Altenmarkt a.d.Alz within Traunstein district
- Interactive map of Altenmarkt a.d.Alz
- Location within Germany Location within Bavaria
- Coordinates: 48°0′N 12°31′E
- Country: Germany
- State: Bavaria
- Admin. region: Oberbayern
- District: Traunstein

Government
  - Mayor (2020–26): Stephan Bierschneider (CSU)

Area
  - Total: 26.1 km^{2} (10.1 sq mi)
- Elevation: 499 m (1,637 ft)

Population (2025-12-31)
  - Total: 4,124
  - Density: 158/km^{2} (409/sq mi)
- Time zone: UTC+01:00 (CET)
  - Summer (DST): UTC+02:00 (CEST)
- Postal codes: 83352
- Dialling codes: 08621
- Vehicle registration: TS
- Website: www.altenmarkt.de

Altenmarkt an der Alz (German pronunciation: [ˈaltn̩maʁkt ʔan deːɐ̯ ˈʔalts], lit. 'Altenmarkt on the Alz') is a municipality in the district of Traunstein in Bavaria, Germany.
