= Zinnkopf =

Mountain in Bavaria, Germany

Coordinates: 47°46′53″N 12°40′39″E

Highest point
- Elevation: 1,227 m (4,026 ft)

Geography
- Location: Bavaria, Germany

Zinnkopf is a mountain of Bavaria, Germany. It rises 1,227 m above sea level.
