= Röthelbach (Saalach) =

River in Germany

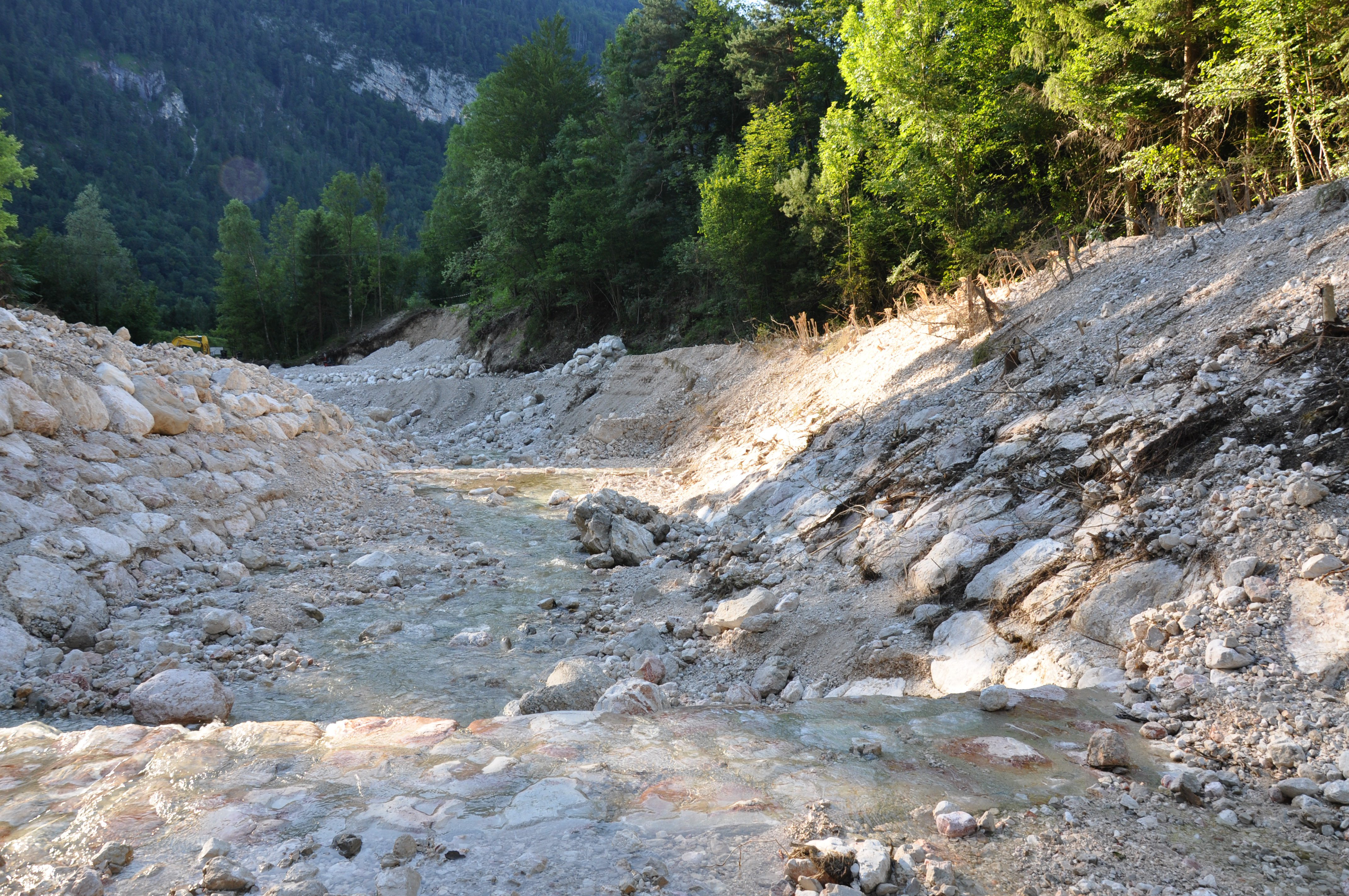
- The Röthelbach shortly before the B 21

Location
- Country: Germany
- States: Bavaria

Physical characteristics
- Mouth
  - location: Saalach
  - coordinates: 47°41′58″N 12°51′01″E

Basin features
- Progression: Saalach→ Salzach→ Inn→ Danube→ Black Sea

Röthelbach is a river of Bavaria, Germany. It is a right tributary of the Saalach near Bad Reichenhall.

== See also ==
- List of rivers of Bavaria
