= Teisenberg =

Mountain in Bavaria, Germany

Coordinates: 47°48′20″N 12°46′06″E

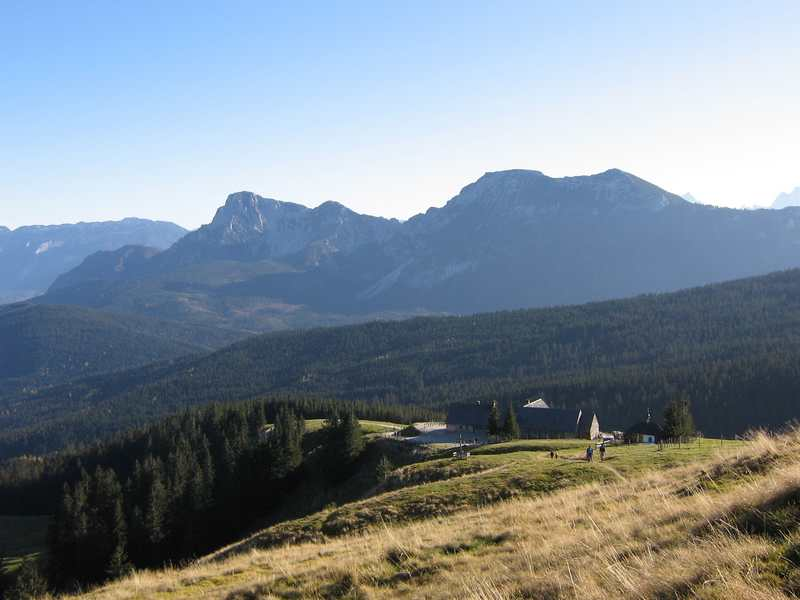
- View from the Schneid to the Stoißer Alm, behind the Staufen, on the left in the background the Untersberg.

Highest point
- Elevation: 1,333 m (4,373 ft)

Geography
- Location: Bavaria, Germany

Teisenberg is a mountain in Bavaria located between the villages Inzell, Anger and Teisendorf. It's the northernmost thousand-metre peak in the German Alps and belongs to the Chiemgau Alps. It offers a view of the Northern Limestone Alps, which tower over it here by about 500 metres in altitude. Below the summit at an altitude of 1270 m is the Stoißer Alm, popular among hikers and mountain bikers. It is open all year round. Also located on the Teisenberg is the Bäcker Alm at 1067 m above sea level, which is open from May to October.

Routes:

Five routes to the Teisenberg are supervised by the DAV section Teisendorf. The summit can be reached in 1½ - 2 hours.

Feilenreit - large tiled stone - Schneid

Seiberstadt - shortest way to Stoißer Alm / summit

Neukirchen/Lochmühle - joins the trail from Seiberstadt at 1000 m.

Hub - possible via Achterhütte or Schneid

Numerous smaller paths and forest roads offer the possibility to determine your own tours. Other well-known trails are the Klostersteig and the Zickzackweg.
