= Franconian Jura =

Highland region in Germany

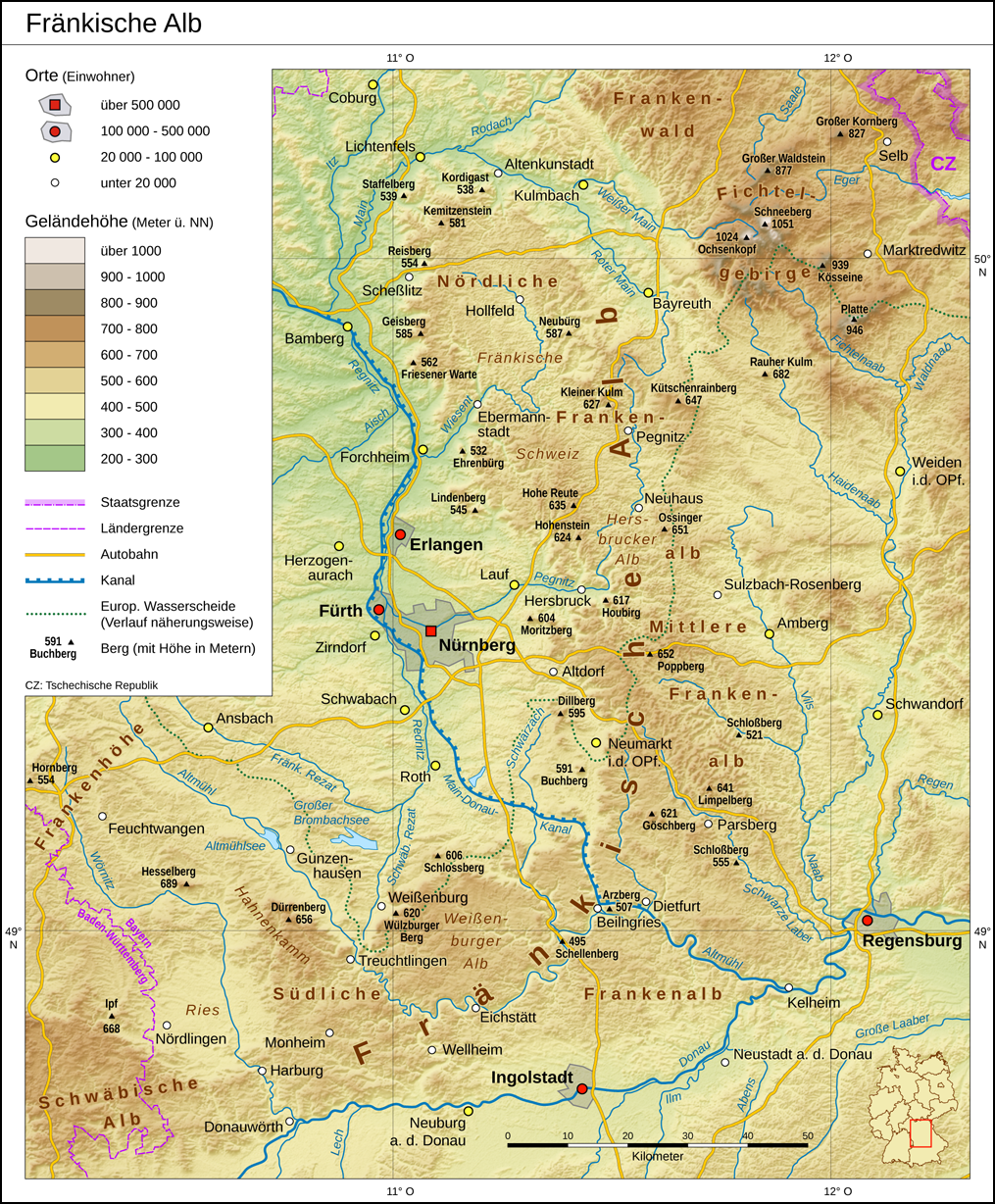
- The Franconian Jura

Highest point
- Peak: Dürrenberg
- Elevation: 656.4 m above NN

Dimensions
- Area: 7,053.8 km^{2} (2,723.5 mi^{2})

Naming
- Native name: Fränkische Alb (German); Frankenalb (German); Fränkischer Jura (German); Frankenjura (German)

Geography
- State(s): Bavaria, Germany
- Range coordinates: 49°00′56″N 10°45′43″E
- Parent range: South German Scarplands

Geology
- Orogenies: low mountains, cuesta

The Franconian Jura (German: Fränkische Alb [ˈfʁɛŋkɪʃə ˈʔalp], Fränkischer Jura, Frankenalb or Frankenjura) is an upland in Franconia, Bavaria, Germany. Located between two rivers, the Danube in the south and the Main in the north, its peaks reach elevations of up to 600 metres (2,000 ft) and it has an area of some 7053.8 km^{2}. It is part of the Table Jura (Tafeljura).

Large portions of the Franconian Jura are part of the Altmühl Valley Nature Park. The scenic meanders and gorges formed by the river Altmühl draw tourists to visit the region.

Geologically, the Franconian Jura is the eastern continuation of the Swabian Jura. The mountain chains are separated from each other by the impact crater of the Nördlinger Ries.

The northern part of the Franconian Jura is known as Franconian Switzerland (German: Fränkische Schweiz).

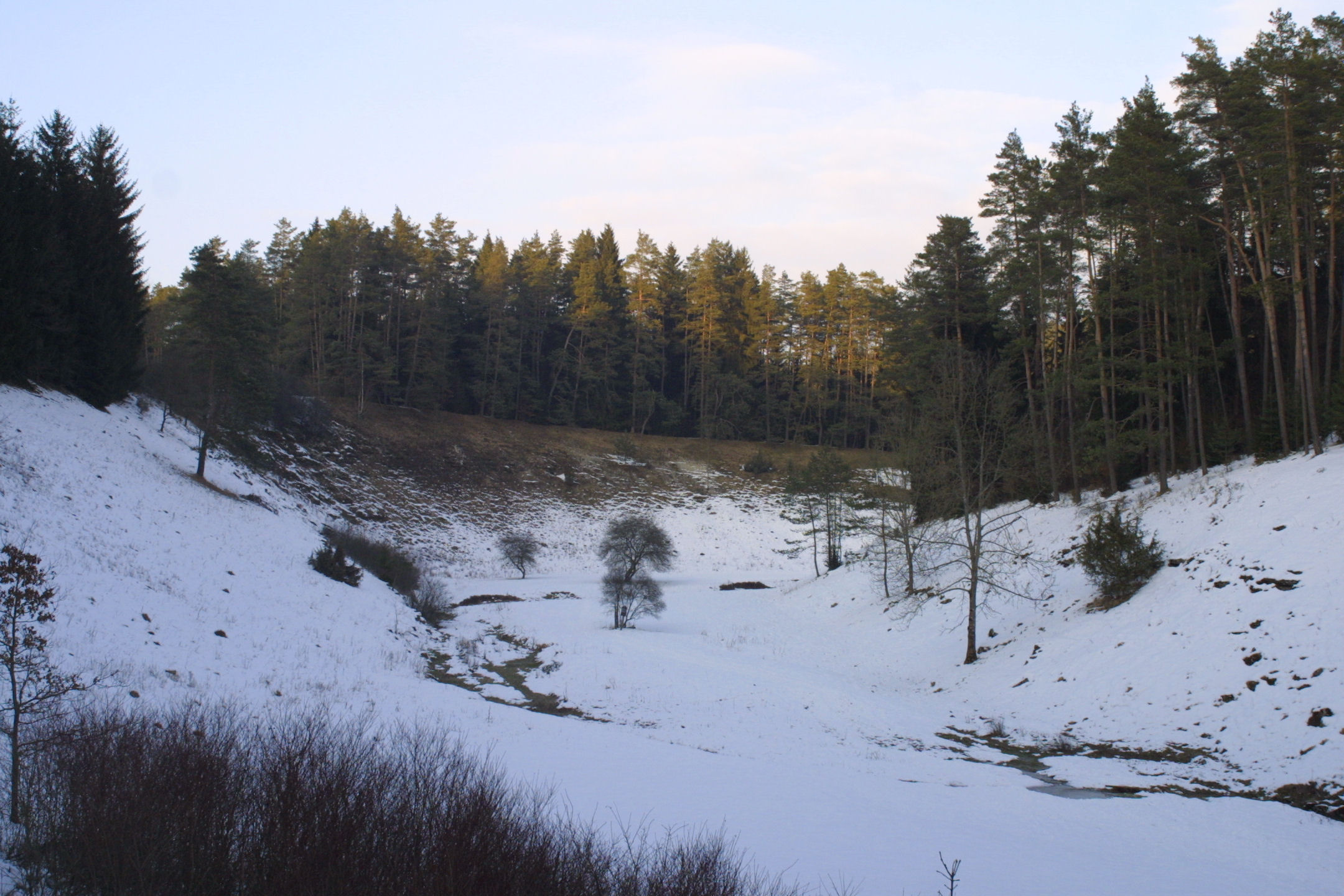
Valley in Franconian Switzerland

== See also ==
- Bärental (Upper Franconia)
- Kalkberg (Weismain)
