= Siegsdorf =

- Municipality
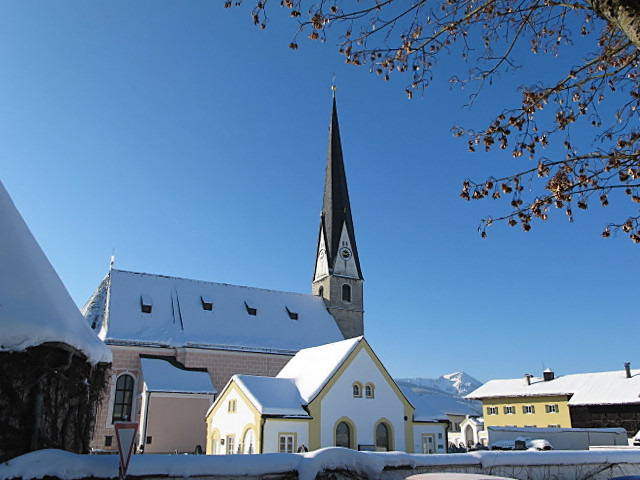
- Church of the Immaculate Conception of the Virgin Mary

- Coat of arms

- Location of Siegsdorf within Traunstein district
- Interactive map of Siegsdorf
- Location within Germany Location within Bavaria
- Coordinates: 47°49′N 12°39′E
- Country: Germany
- State: Bavaria
- Admin. region: Oberbayern
- District: Traunstein
- Subdivisions: 6 Ortsteile

Government
  - Mayor (2020–26): Thomas Kamm

Area
  - Total: 57 km^{2} (22 sq mi)
- Elevation: 615 m (2,018 ft)

Population (2025-12-31)
  - Total: 8,318
  - Density: 150/km^{2} (380/sq mi)
- Time zone: UTC+01:00 (CET)
  - Summer (DST): UTC+02:00 (CEST)
- Postal codes: 83313
- Dialling codes: 08662
- Vehicle registration: TS
- Website: www.siegsdorf.de

Siegsdorf (German pronunciation: [ˈziːksdɔʁf]) is a municipality in the district of Traunstein in Bavaria, Germany.

== Notable residents ==
Ski jumper Markus Eisenbichler and murderer Christian Gerhartsreiter were both born in Siegsdorf, and. Jimmy Carl Black of Frank Zappa's Mothers of Invention died there.
