= Traun (Alz) =

River in Germany

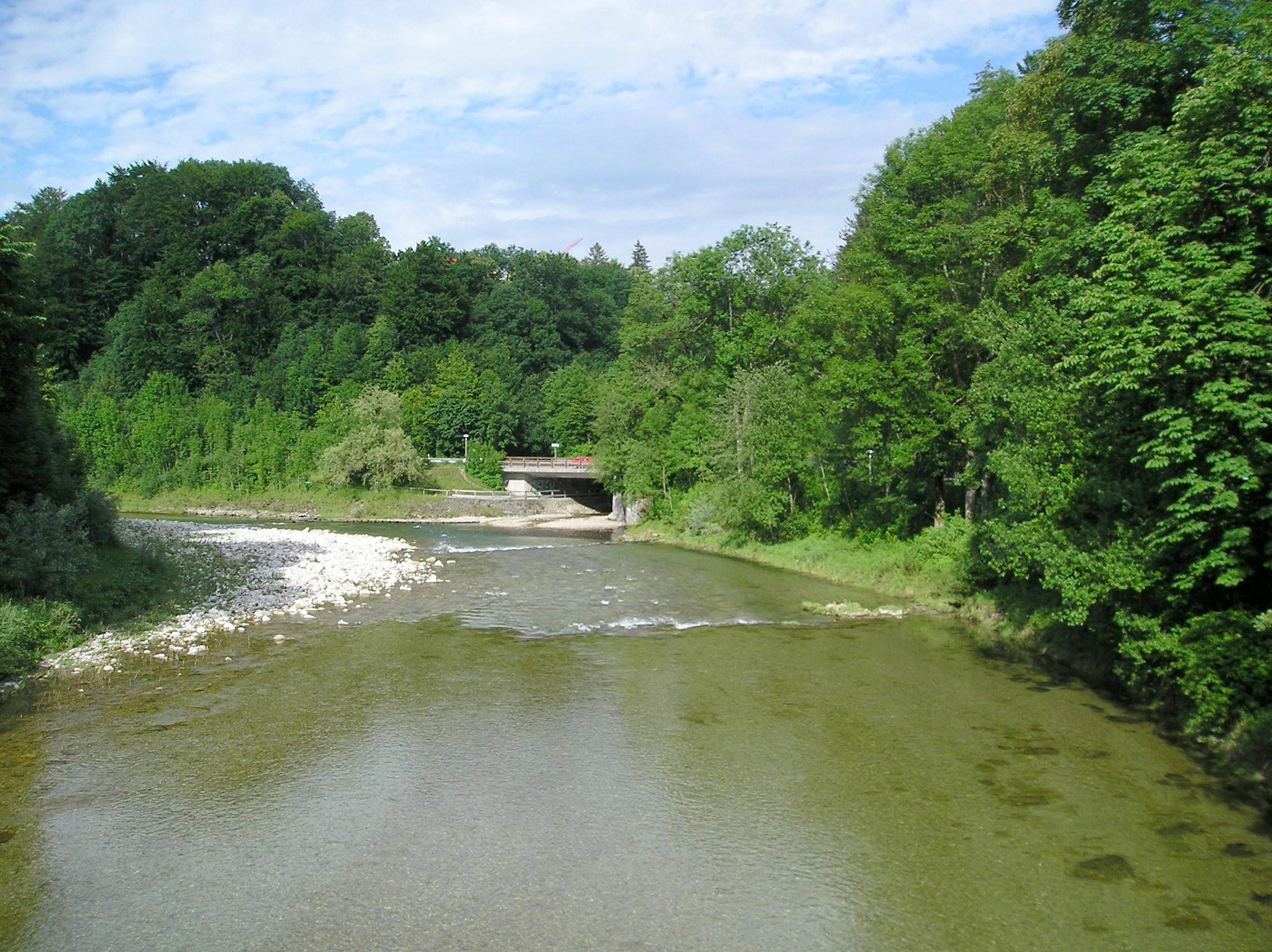
- The Traun in Traunstein

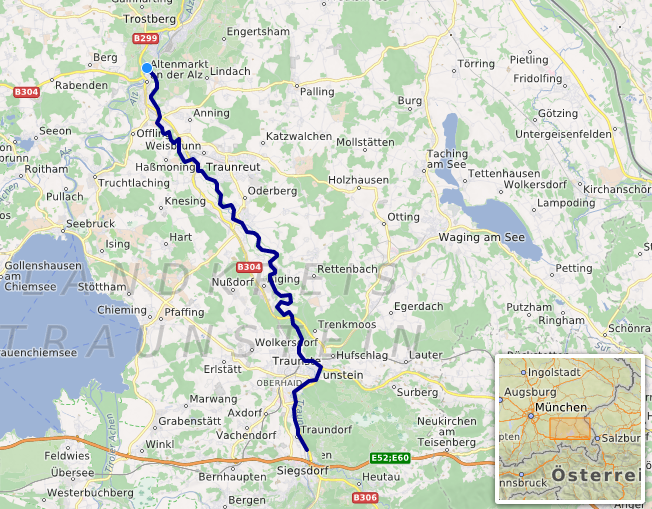
- Course of the Traun (interactive map)

Location
- Country: Germany
- State: Bavaria
- District: Traunstein
- Reference no.: DE: 1848

Physical characteristics
- Source
  - location: origin: confluence of the Weiße and Rote Traun near Siegsdorf
  - coordinates: 47°49′58″N 12°38′47″E
  - elevation: ca. 600 m
- Mouth
  - location: near Altenmarkt an der Alz into the Alz
  - coordinates: 48°00′31″N 12°32′11″E
  - elevation: 487 m
- Length: 28.9 km (18.0 mi) (including the Weiße Traun and Fischbach 54.5 km)
- Basin size: 380 km^{2} (150 sq mi)

Basin features
- Progression: Alz→ Inn→ Danube→ Black Sea
- Landmarks: Large towns: Traunreut; Small towns: Traunstein

The Traun (German: [tʁaʊn]) is a river in Upper Bavaria, Germany. The nearly 29 kilometer long river is formed by the confluence of the Weiße Traun (White Traun), also considered its upper course) and the Rote Traun (Red Traun) near Siegsdorf. It passes through Traunstein and Traunreut, and flows into the Alz near Altenmarkt an der Alz.

== See also ==
- List of rivers of Bavaria
