= Alz =

River in Germany

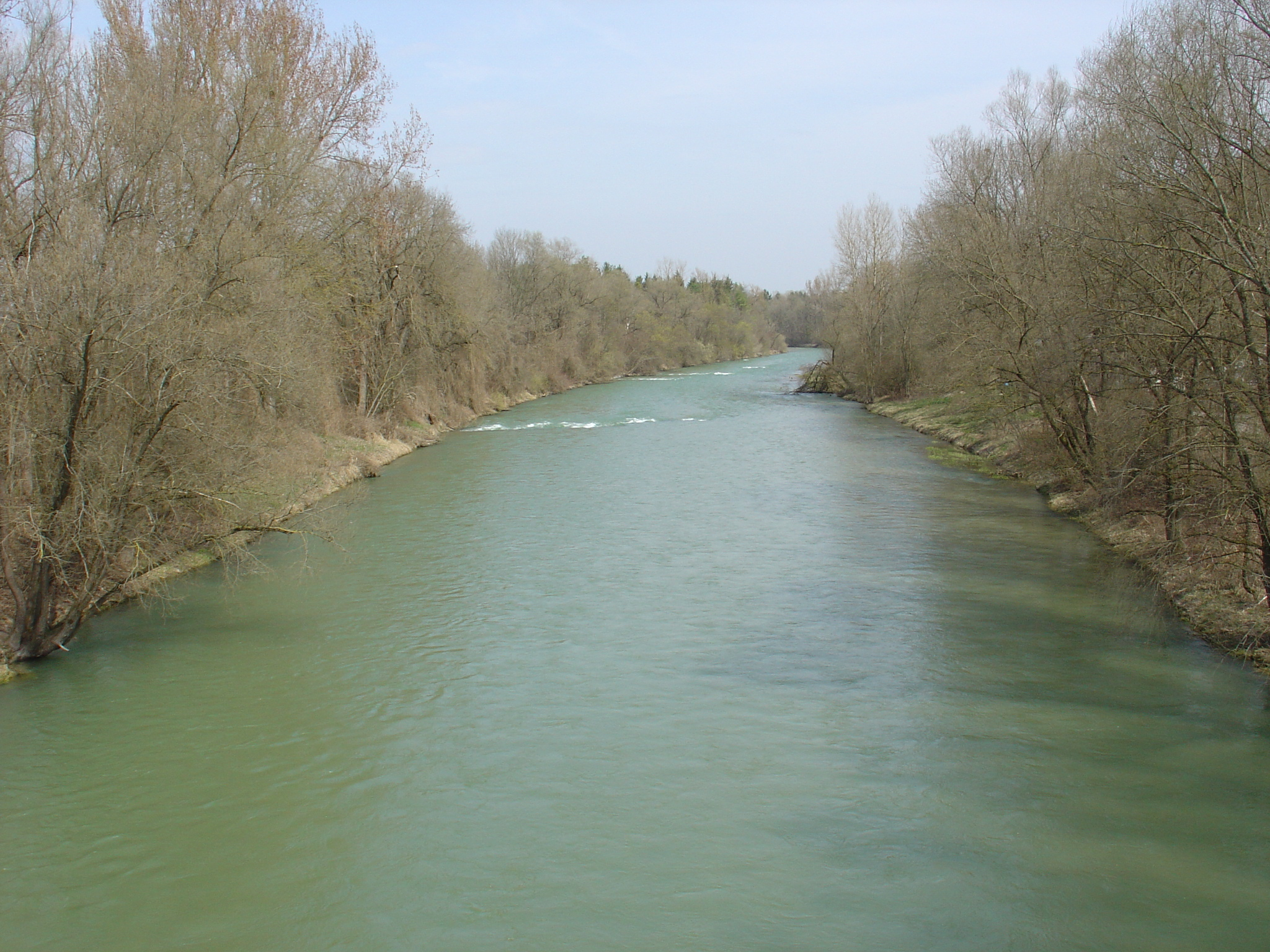
- The Alz at Emmerting

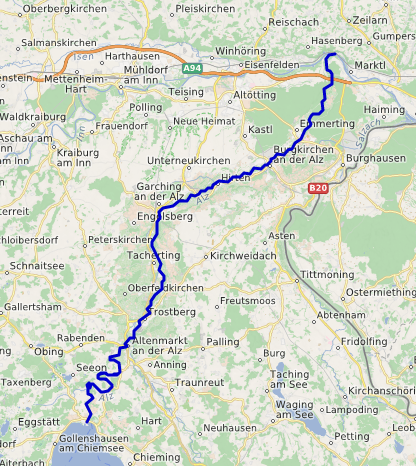

Location
- Country: Germany

Physical characteristics
- Source
  - location: Chiemsee
  - elevation: 518 m (1,699 ft)
- Mouth
  - location: Inn
  - coordinates: 48°16′12″N 12°49′3″E
- Length: 67.3 km (41.8 mi)
- Basin size: 2,239 km^{2} (864 sq mi)
- Discharge
  - average: ±75 m^{3}/s (2,600 cu ft/s)

Basin features
- Progression: Inn→ Danube→ Black Sea

The Alz (German: [alts]) is a river in Bavaria, southern Germany, the only discharge of the Chiemsee. Its origin is on the northern shore of the lake near Seebruck. It is a right tributary of the Inn, into which it flows in Marktl. Other towns on the Alz are Altenmarkt an der Alz, Trostberg, Garching an der Alz and Burgkirchen an der Alz.

The Alz is divided into the Obere Alz (upper Alz) and the Untere Alz (lower Alz). The section from the Chiemsee down to Altenmarkt is called the Obere Alz. From Altenmarkt to the mouth in Marktl, it is called the Untere Alz.

The Traun, a 29 km (18 mi) river flowing past the regional administrative center of Traunstein, is a tributary of the Alz.

== Name ==
The river was first documented between 785 and 798 as Alzus. Later sources call it Alezussa, Alzissa, or Alzussa.

== Pollution ==
In the Lower Alz region, the river is characterized by heavy industrial use on its way through the Bavarian Chemical Triangle. From Trostberg onwards, multiple canal diversions mean that only a fraction of the water volume remains in its original bed. In the Burgkirchen area, for example, the average discharge of the Alz is 12.7 m³/s, and in the Alz Canal it is approximately 55 m³/s (up to 75 m³/s). The diverted water is used primarily for cooling and as process water and for generating electricity. Large power plants are located in Laufenau and at the waterfall near Altenmarkt, Trostberg, Wajon near Tacherting, Wald near Garching, Hirten near Burgkirchen, and north of Burghausen. Unlike the Alz, the Alz Canal does not flow into the Inn, but into the Salzach near Burghausen.

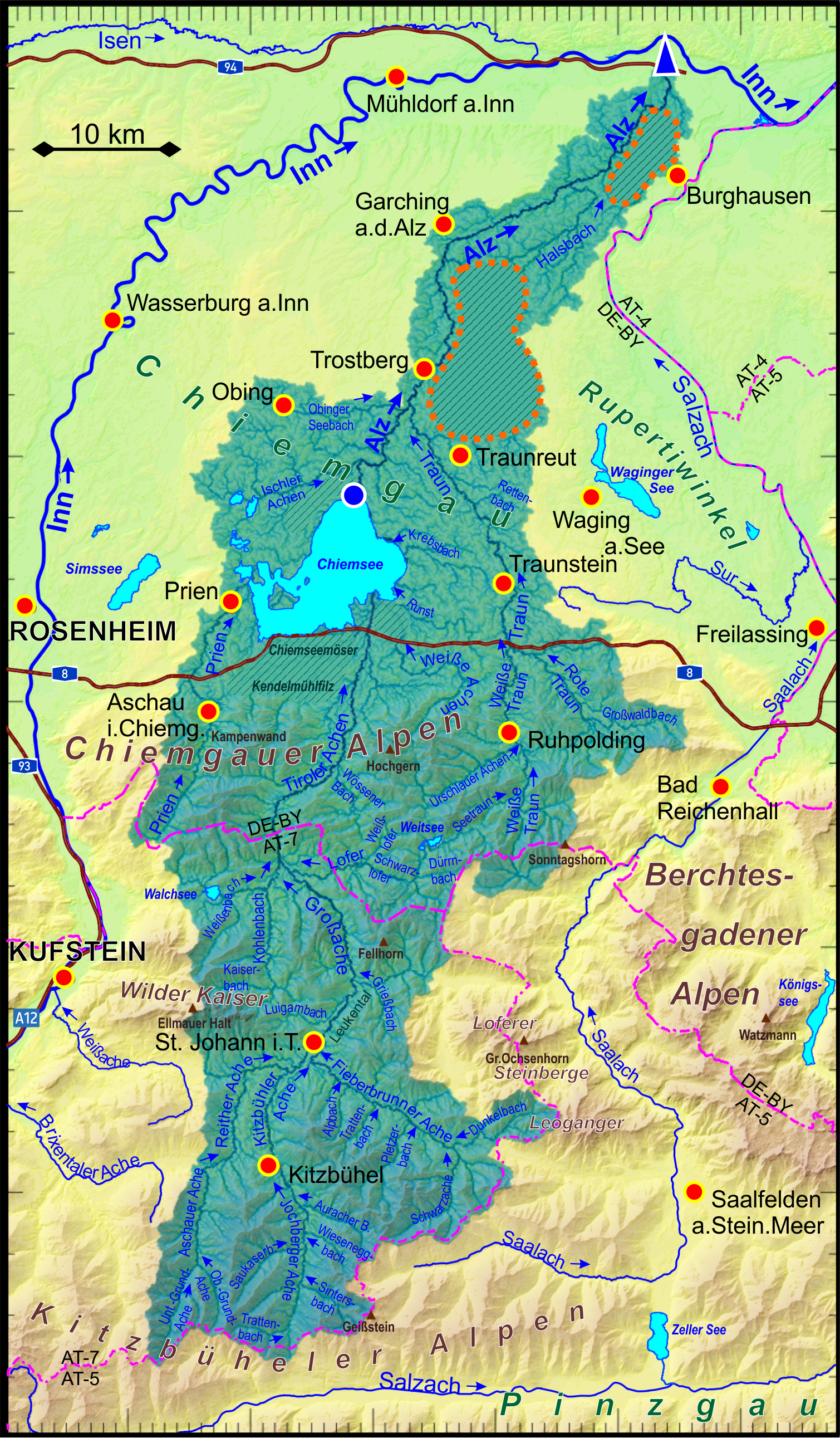

Overall, water quality has improved significantly since the 1980s. The modernization or construction of new wastewater treatment plants that use the Alz River as a receiving watercourse has made a significant contribution to this. One of the largest projects was the ring sewer system for all the towns bordering Lake Chiemsee, which was commissioned in 1989. Industrial pollutant discharges decreased due to optimized use and treatment of process water, as well as changes in product ranges. Nevertheless, in the fall of 2006, the Fraunhofer Institute for Molecular Biology and Applied Ecology (IME) in Aachen measured concentrations of perfluorooctanoic acid up to 56.1 μg/l and Perfluorooctanesulfonic acid up to 14.1 ng/l below Gendorf.

== Etymology ==
From pre-indoeuropean *alz "swamp, alder".

== See also ==
- List of rivers of Bavaria
