= Collegiate Church of Saints Philip and James, Altötting =

Coordinates: 48°13′32″N 12°40′34″E

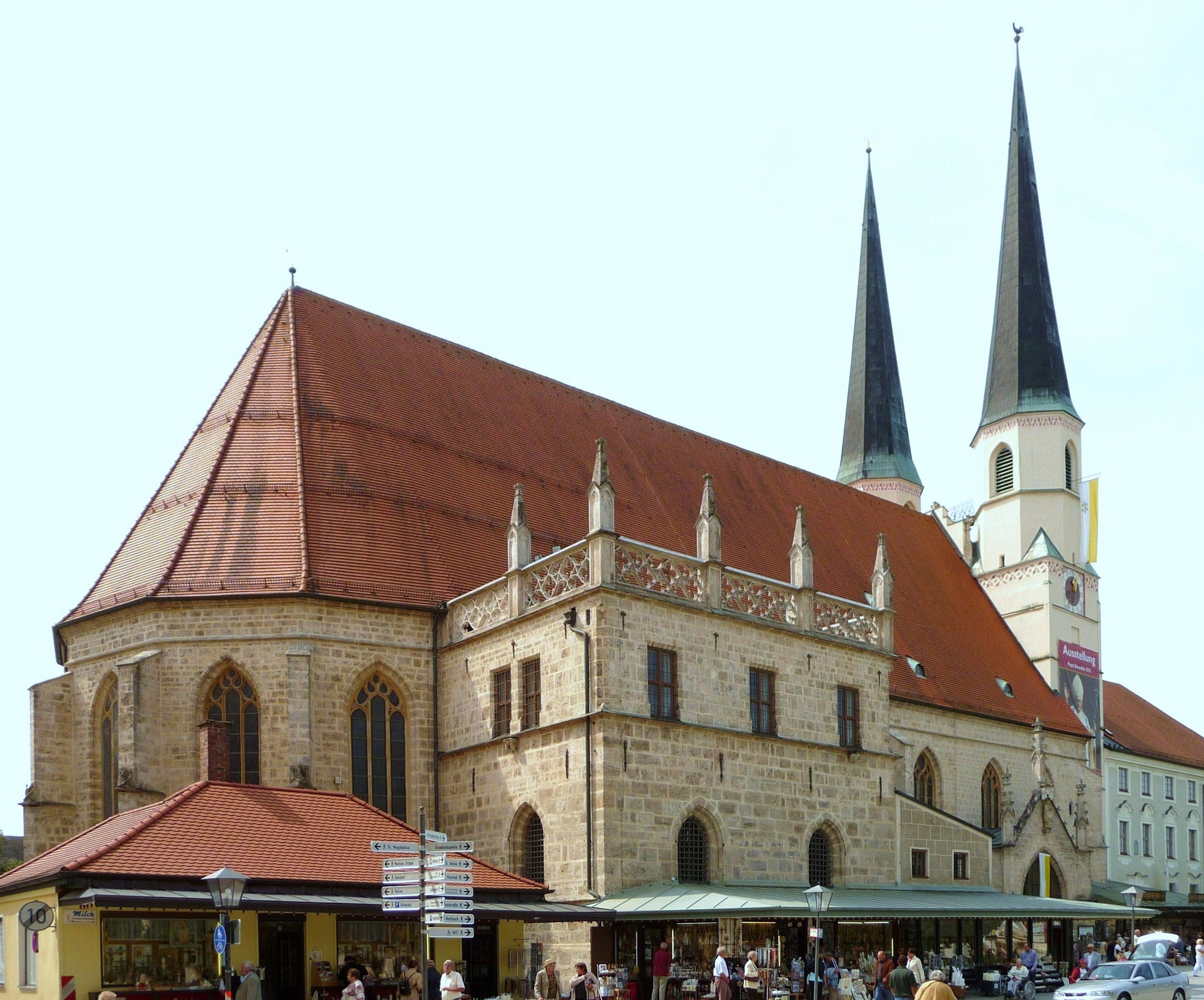
Collegiate church

The Collegiate Church of Saints Philip and James, Altötting (German: Stiftspfarrkirche St. Philipp und Jakob), with the associated college or community of secular canons (German: Kollegiatstift Altötting), was founded in about 1228 in Altötting, Bavaria, southern Germany.

== Monastery ==
The first foundation on the site was a monastery, Ötting or Altötting Abbey (German: Kloster Ötting or Altötting), founded in 876/877 by King Carloman, to which he entrusted the palatine chapel of Altötting and also Mattsee Abbey, and where he was later buried. The monastery apparently survived the Hungarian invasions of the early 10th century but ceased to function some time later in the 10th or possibly the early 11th century.

== Collegiate church ==
On the same site in about 1228 Louis I, Duke of Bavaria, established a community of 12 secular canons attached to the collegiate church. The canons were given the livings of the parishes of Altötting, Waldötting (now Kastl) and Unterneukirchen. In 1382 the number of canons was reduced to 8. In 1401 were added the livings of the parishes of Neuötting, Alzgern, Burgkirchen am Wald, Perach, Hirschhorn and Rogglfing (both in Wurmannsquick), in 1404 Eggenfelden, and in 1424 Oberaichbach.

The collegiate church was built on the site of the earlier monastic church and in 1265 was dedicated to Saints Philip and James. From 1489 however the rapidly growing importance of Altötting as a place of pilgrimage made a bigger church urgently necessary and it was largely rebuilt between 1499 and 1511 in its present form as a late Gothic hall church.

The college of canons was secularised in 1803, when the parishes became financially independent.

== Re-foundation ==
In 1930 the community was refounded, with new accommodation built, as the Kollegiatstift St. Rupertus in Altötting. The canons are retired clergymen and their ministry is to the pilgrims.

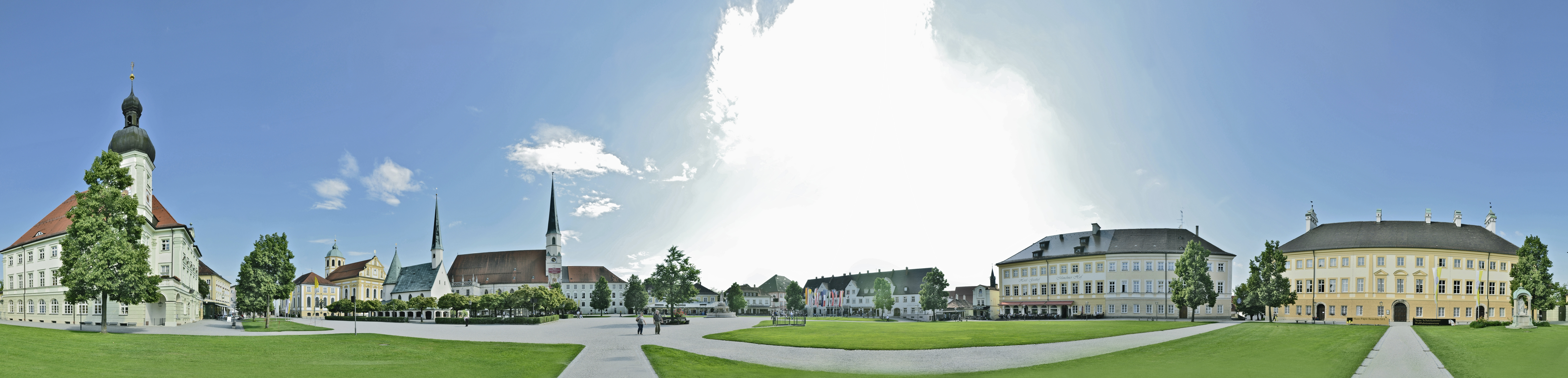
Kapellplatz

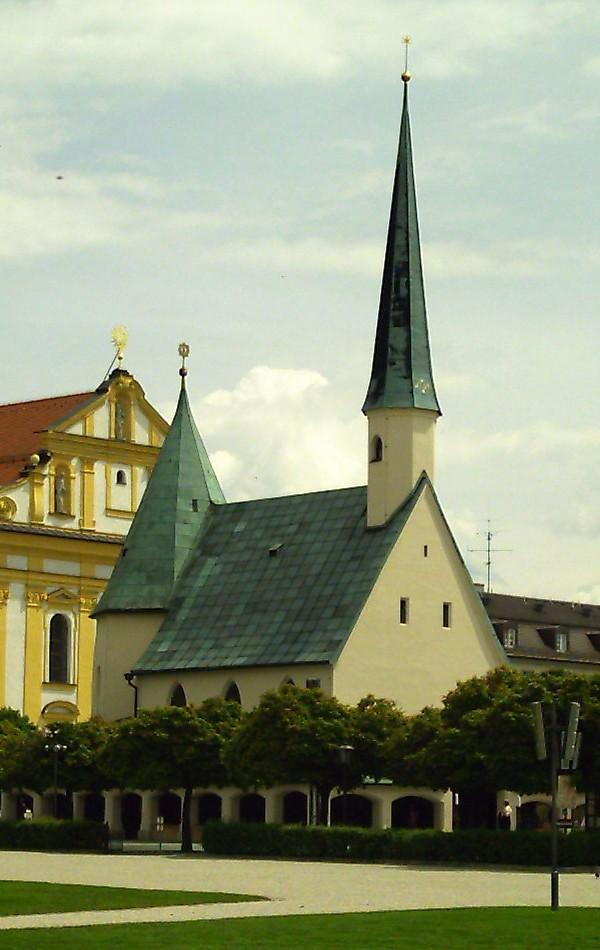
Gnadenkapelle

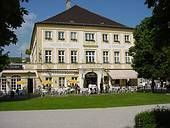
Hotel zur Post
