= Tyrlaching =

- Municipality
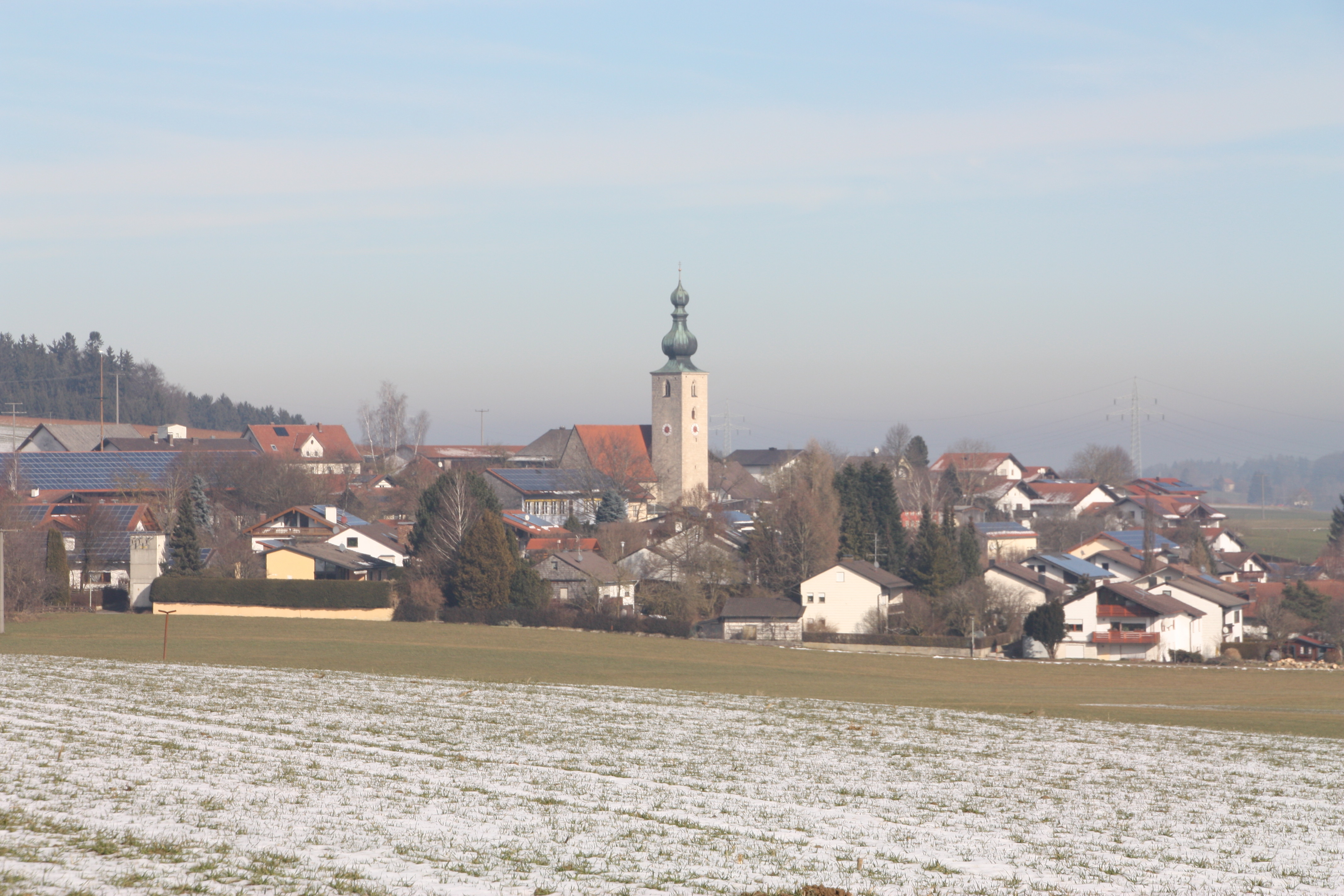
- General view of the municipality

- Coat of arms

- Location of Tyrlaching within Altötting district
- Interactive map of Tyrlaching
- Location within Germany Location within Bavaria
- Coordinates: 48°4′N 12°40′E
- Country: Germany
- State: Bavaria
- Admin. region: Oberbayern
- District: Altötting
- Municipal assoc.: Kirchweidach

Government
  - Mayor (2020–26): Andreas Zepper

Area
  - Total: 20.54 km^{2} (7.93 sq mi)
- Elevation: 520 m (1,710 ft)

Population (2025-12-31)
  - Total: 1,057
  - Density: 51.46/km^{2} (133.3/sq mi)
- Time zone: UTC+01:00 (CET)
  - Summer (DST): UTC+02:00 (CEST)
- Postal codes: 84558
- Dialling codes: 08623
- Vehicle registration: AÖ
- Website: tyrlaching.de

Tyrlaching is a municipality in the district of Altötting in Bavaria, Germany. It is part of the municipal association (Verwaltungsgemeinschaft) Kirchweidach.

== Geography ==
Tyrlaching is situated on the northern edge of the historic Rupertiwinkel region, near the border with Austria. It is the district's southernmost municipality, located at the boundary with Traunstein district. The municipal area comprises the Rainbichl hill, with 544 metres (1,785 ft) the highest point of Altötting district, offering a panoramic view to the mountain chain of the Northern Limestone Alps in the south.

== History ==
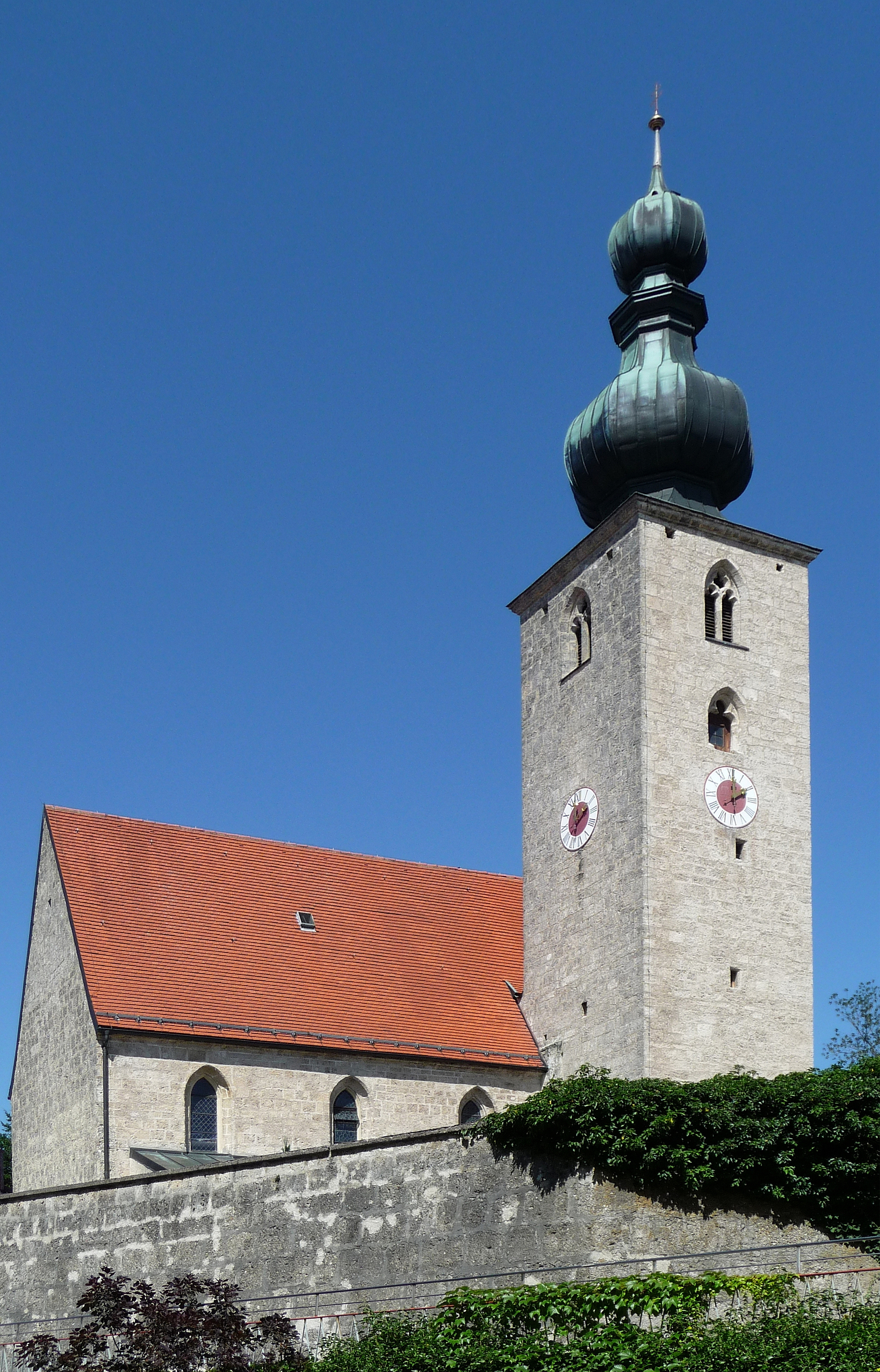
Parish church of St John the Baptist

The settlement of Deolekingas in the German stem duchy of Bavaria was first mentioned about 790 AD, then a possession of St Peter's Abbey, Salzburg. Temporarily the seat of a local Amt administration of the episcopal lands, it became part of the immediate Prince-Archbishopric of Salzburg in the late 13th century.

Upon the German mediatization of 1803, Tyrlaching and the whole Rupertiwinkel region passed to the short-lived Electorate of Salzburg under Grand Duke Ferdinand III of Tuscany and fell to the newly established Austrian Empire according to the 1805 Peace of Pressburg. In 1809/10 Austria had to cede the Salzburg Rupertiwinkel to the Kingdom of Bavaria.

The Tyrlaching municipality was incorporated into Altötting district in the course of a 1972 administrative reform.
