= Ronald Schmidt =

Ronald Schmidt may refer to:

- Ronald Schmidt (footballer), German footballer
- Ronald V. Schmidt, American computer network engineer
