= Fredl Fesl =

German musician (1947–2024)

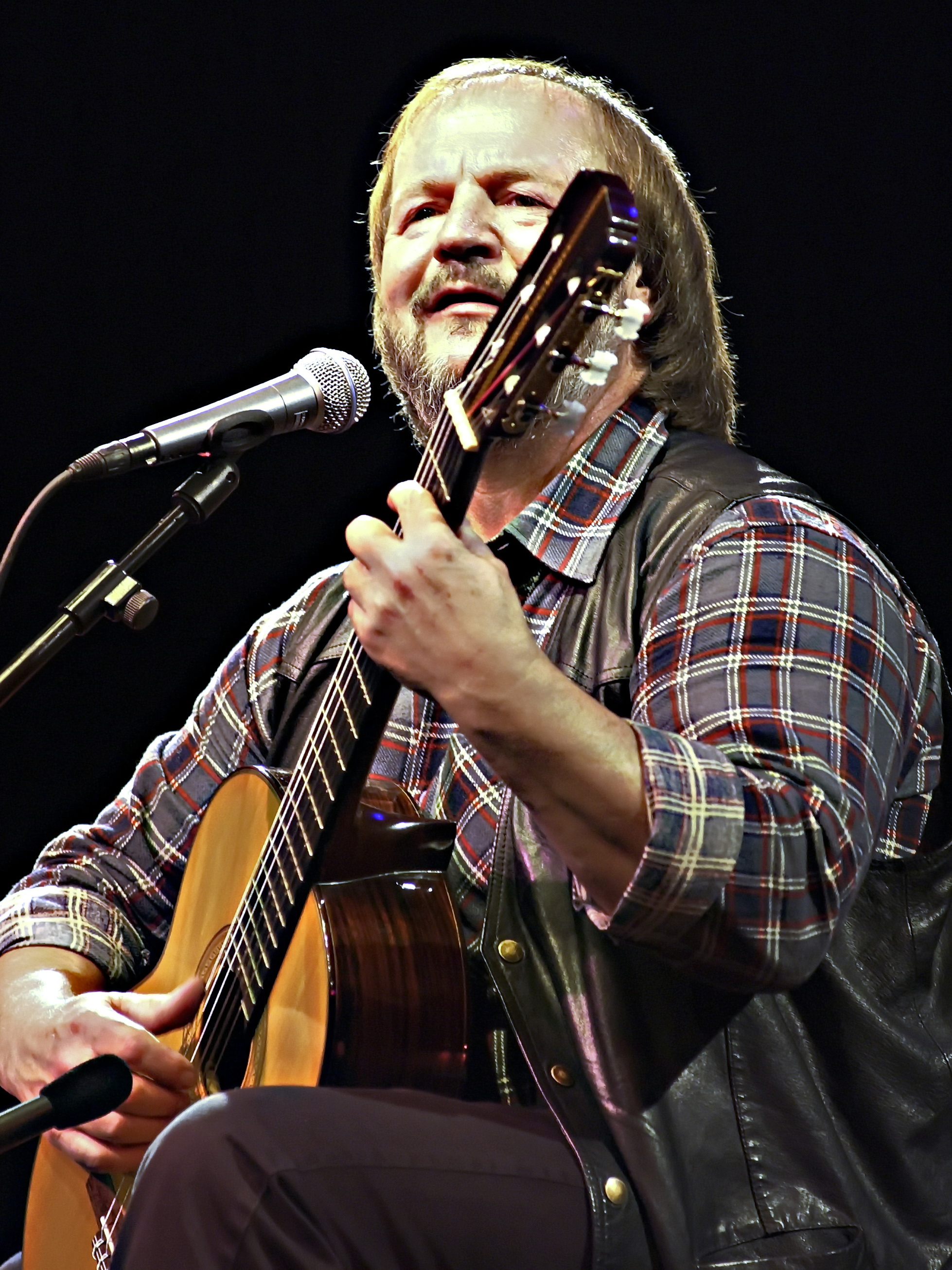
- Fesl in 2005

Background information
- Born: Alfred Raimund Fesl; 7 July 1947; Grafenau, Bavaria, Allied-occupied Germany
- Died: 25 June 2024 (aged 76) Pleiskirchen, Bavaria, Germany
- Genres: Bavarian musical Kabarett
- Occupation: Musician
- Instruments: Guitar, trumpet, tuba, alto horn, piano
- Years active: 1976–2006
- Spouse(s): Karin (divorced) Monika Fritzsch (m. 2005–2024)

Alfred Raimund Fesl (7 July 1947 – 25 June 2024), better known as Fredl Fesl, was a Lower Bavarian musician and singer who was said to be the one who invented Bavarian musical Kabarett.

== Early life ==
Fesl grew up in the town of his birth, Grafenau in the Bavarian Forest and then moved with his parents to Greding in Middle Franconia. There, Fesl's parents ran an inn, Zum Bayerischen. In his childhood, Fesl was, according to the story, once expelled from a school for replying to a box on the ear from a teacher by boxing the teacher's ear back. Further academic endeavours, though, were somewhat more successful. After finishing at the Volksschule, he passed the intake examination for the Oberrealschule in Ingolstadt (now called the Christoph-Scheiner-Gymnasium), where he lived at boarding school. In 1959, the family moved to Munich, where Fesl learnt from his father how to play the trumpet — this after his earlier failed attempts in Greding to teach his son to play the clarinet and the accordion. Fesl was, in both 1966 and 1967 the Upper Bavarian Junior Champion Weightlifter for the club ESV (Note: ESV stands for Eisenbahner-Sportverein ("railwaymen's sport club"), a club specifically for (then) Deutsche Bundesbahn and (now) Deutsche Bahn employees.) München Ost, to which he had belonged since 1962. Fesl did an apprenticeship as an artist blacksmith. He learnt to play guitar while he was in the Bundeswehr, where he also became the joker in the background in his outfit, the Gebirgsjägertruppe ("Mountain Infantry"), which somewhat irked his superiors.

== Career ==
After Fesl had tried his hand at various occupations (by his own word, he worked as a furrier, a film set builder, an extra, a locksmith, a fashion jewellery seller, a bulky-waste collector, an antique dealer and a beer lorry driver), he wanted to establish himself as an artist blacksmith, setting himself up a workshop in Freising. According to Fesl himself, his career as a musician began when he found that he could get into cabaret theatres ("Kleinkunstbühnen") in Munich free if he showed up with a guitar and told the staff that he was one of the musicians who were to appear. One evening, when the actual artistes failed to show up, Fesl was asked to get up on the stage himself and perform. With his funny, chatty manner, he quickly won the audience's favour. In 1976, at the Theater im Fraunhofer in Munich, he made his first record, entitled simply Fredl Fesl. After its release, he got his own television programme, Fredl und seine Gäste ("Fredl and his Guests").

One of Fesl's trademarks in his live appearances was the detailed speeches that he gave before each number, which by his own admission were sometimes longer than the songs themselves. He ended his concerts by doing a handstand on the chair on which he had been sitting and playing his songs. Fesl was often associated with the song "Der Königsjodler" ("The King's Yodeller"), which he had earlier regularly performed. Other well known songs in Fesl's repertoire were "Der edle Rittersepp", "Anlass-Jodler", the "Taxilied" and the "Fußball-Lied". In the media, he was sometimes called "Bajubarde" ("Bayou Bard") or "Bayerns bester Barde" ("Bavaria's Best Bard").

For a few years, Fesl could regularly be heard in radio advertisements for the beer brand Veldensteiner. In 2008, there was a civil court case arising from the mention of Jürgen Klinsmann in one advertisement, which the brewer, Kaiser Bräu, lost. Klinsmann's actual complaint was that the Denglisch word "clean" was being used in the advertisement to refer to the first syllable in his last name. The presiding judge in the case stressed that it was "certainly not the worst case of violating personal rights, but name rights have been fundamentally violated." (Note: The judge's actual words in German were "...sicher nicht der schlimmste Fall von Persönlichkeitsrechtsverletzung, aber das Namensrecht ist grundsätzlich verletzt.") The offending beer commercial was banned, as well. Fesl had this to say about the proceedings: "There are worse things, mushy Semmelknödel for instance."

== Later years ==
Beginning in 1997, Fesl found that he was suffering from Parkinson's disease and thus in late 2006, he had to cut his well attended farewell tour short. In 2009, to alleviate his Parkinson's symptoms, he had a "brain pacemaker" surgically implanted. His life with this illness was documented within the framework of the ZDF series 37°. In 2015, his autobiography "Ohne Gaudi is ois nix" came out. The book contained memories from Fesl himself, along with some from companions such as Zither-Manä, Mike Krüger, Konstantin Wecker, Hans Well, Willy Astor and Martina Schwarzmann.

Fesl was also an inventor of sorts. Later in life, he came up with something called the Schunkelhilfe (roughly, "sway helper"), a modified, concave chair seat that was designed to make it easier for the sitter to sway back and forth in time to music. Fellow Kabarett artist Claudia Pichler called it Fesl's "possibly most pointless invention". Fesl explained his thinking thus:

Es gibt Heerscharen von Ingenieuren, die sich überlegen, was die Leute noch alles brauchen könnten. Da ist es schwierig, einen Fuß in die Tür zu kriegen. Auf dem Sektor „Was der Mensch ganz dringend überhaupt nicht braucht" dagegen hat man noch Chancen!

(There are loads of engineers thinking about all the things that people still might need. That makes it hard to get one's foot in the door. In the sector "what mankind quite urgently does not need at all," on the other hand, one still has a chance!)

He marketed his invention online.

== Personal life and death ==
Fesl's first wife was Karin, with whom he had two children. This marriage, however, did not last. Fesl never made public the exact nature of his marital woes, saying that the "yellow press" would be hounding him at once should he ever yield up the "fodder" that they sought.

Fesl lived with his second wife Monika (née Fritzsche) in Häuslaign, an outlying centre of the Upper Bavarian municipality of Pleiskirchen consisting of only one homestead (called an Einöde in southern Germany). He had two daughters, Daniela and Stefanie, by his first wife, Karin.

Outside his musical and humorous work, Fesl also owned an excavator. This was publicly known because Ottfried Fischer mentioned it in several episodes of his programme Ottis Schlachthof. He reportedly bought it for work on his estate. Fesl himself mentioned using it to dig ponds.

After a year long battle with Parkinson's disease, Fesl died on 25 June 2024, at the age of 76.

== Music ==
Fesl called his works "Bavarian and melancomical songs" (Note: Fesl used the words melankomische Lieder in German. The word melancomical represents the contributor's best attempt to "translate" the non-standard adjective.) (the subtitle to his fourth album), which are sung in Lower Bavarian dialect, often have their roots in folk music and do not seldom contain puns. Fesl played guitar, tuba, trumpet, alto horn and piano. Ottfried Fischer described him in his Kabarett talk show Ottis Schlachthof ("Otti's Slaughterhouse"} on Bayerisches Fernsehen in 1999 as a member of the uppermost guild of Bavarian singer-songwriters, as a genuine Pfundskerl (roughly, "great fellow") and as a rebel of the rather gentler kind with background and droll humour.

== Distinctions ==
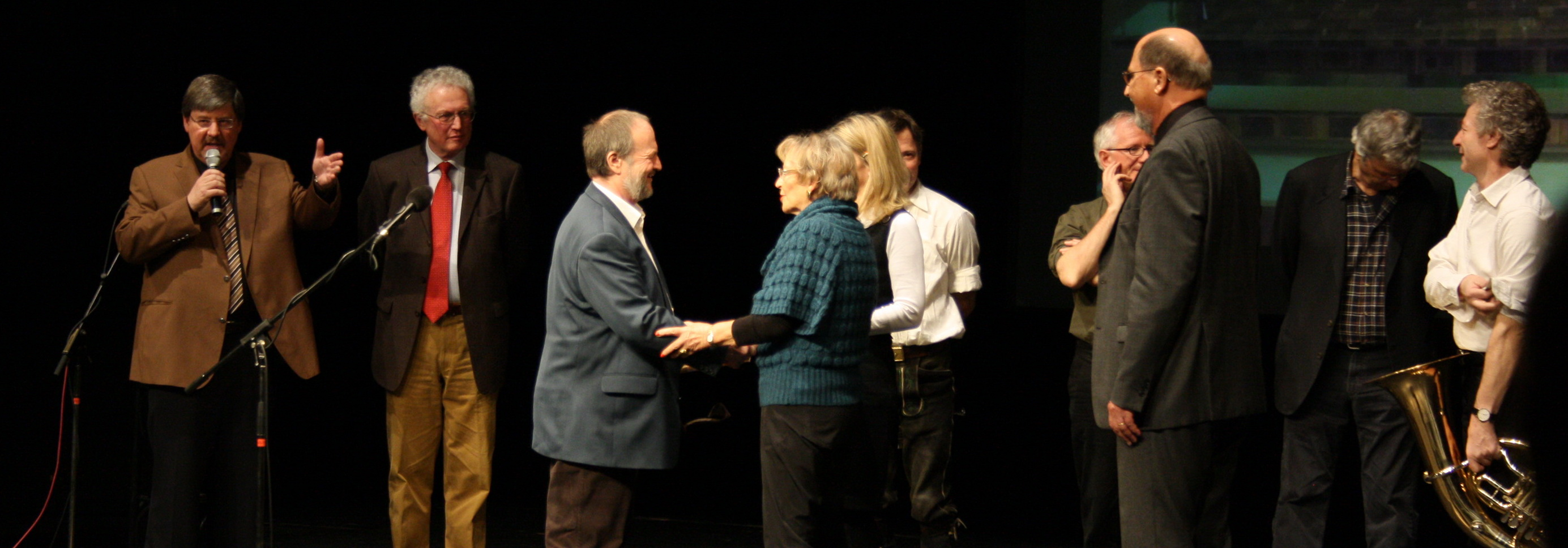
Fesl being awarded the Großer Karl-Valentin-Preis, 2010

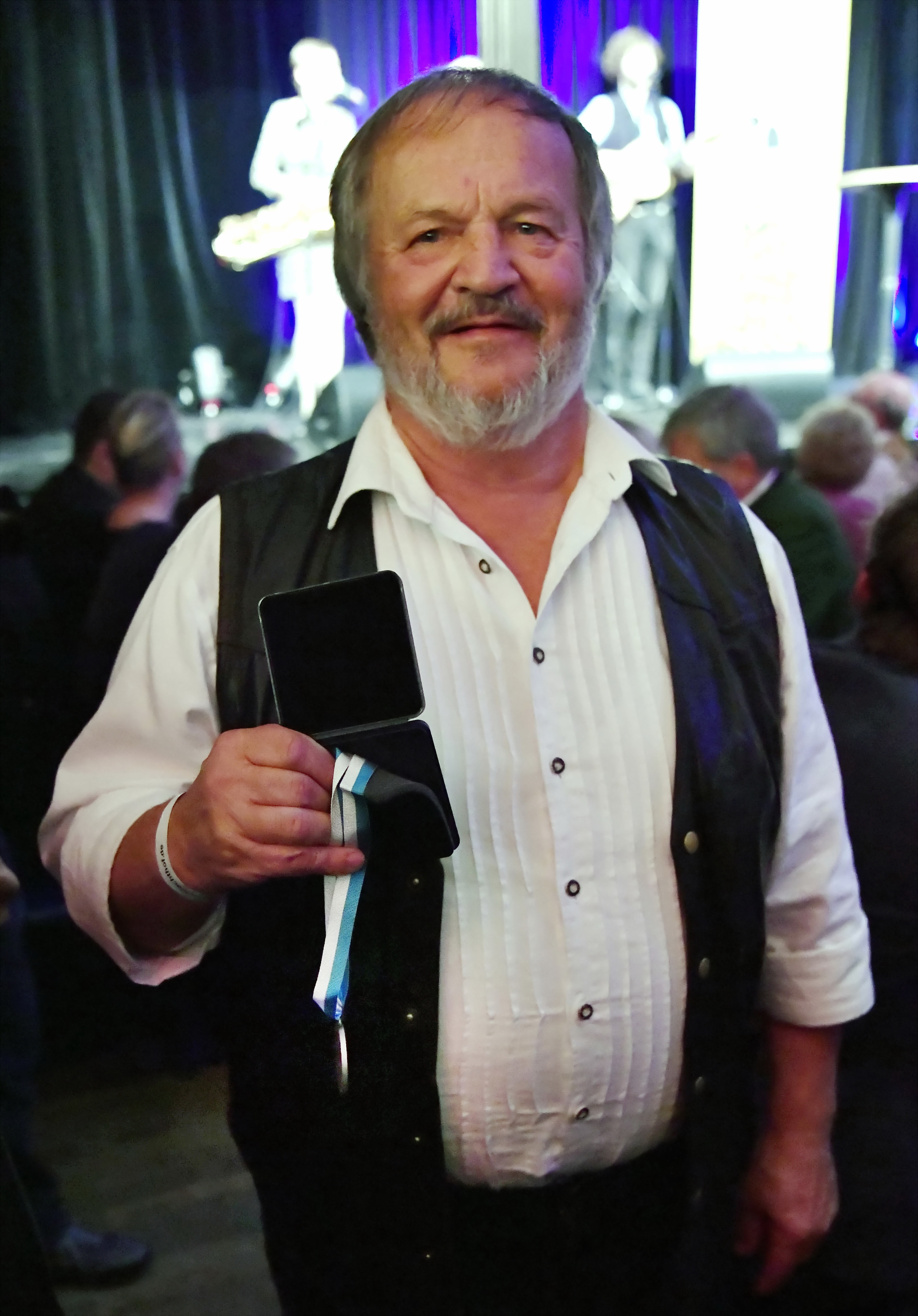
Fredl Fesl, Bayerischer Poetentaler ("Bavarian Poet's Medallion"), 2017

- 2002: Bayerischer Kabarettpreis – music
- 2004: München leuchtet – Den Freunden Münchens silver medal
- 2004: Sigi-Sommer-Taler from Narhalla München (a carnival company)
- 2007: Kulturpreis des Landkreises Altötting (Cultural Prize of the District of Altötting)
- 2007: Kulturpreis der Bayerischen Landesstiftung (Cultural Prize of the Bavarian State Foundation)
- 2010: Großer Karl-Valentin-Preis
- 2016: Großer Morisk der Würmesia
- 2017: Bayerischer Poetentaler
- 2020: Reiherorden der Narrhalla Erding
- 2022: Bavarian Order of Merit

== Well known titles ==
- 1976 Ritter Hadubrand
- 1976 Taxilied (often presented live as Ich will nicht nach Dachau)
- 1976 Der Königsjodler
- 1977 Der edle Rittersepp
- 1978 Anlass-Jodler
- 1978 Fußball-Lied
- 1978 Der Bi-Ba-Butzemann
- 1978 Preiß’n-Jodler
- 1978 Schulmeisterei
- 1981 Sepp bleib’ da (sung to the tune of Adelita by Francisco Tárrega)
- 1983 Ein Pferd hat vier Beiner
- 1983 Weil i net mog
- 2000 Riesenneger im Nieselregen

== Discography ==
=== Albums ===
- Fredl Fesl (1976)
- Fredl Fesl 2 (1977)
- Fredl Fesl – Drei (1978)
- Fredl Fesl 4 – Bayrische und melankomische Lieder (1981)
- Die Fünfte von Fredl Fesl (1983)
- Fredl Fesl 6 – D’ Welt hat an Vogel (1993)

=== Compilations ===
- Fredl Fesl – Meine schönsten Lieder & Sprüche (1985 LP [CBS Records], 2006 CD [MVC])
- Fredl Fesl – Eine Stunde mit Fredl Fesl (1989)
- Fredl Fesl – Ein bayerischer Abend (1997)
- Fredl Fesl – Anlass-Jodler (2003, double album)
- Fredl Fesl – Der bayerische Stier – Seine schönsten melankomischen Lieder (2005, double album)
- Fredl Fesl – Fußball-Lied und andere Erfolge (2005, 3 CDs)
- Fredl Fesl – Ritter, Wirtsleut, Preiss’n und i (2007, 3 CDs, albums 1–3)

== Other work ==
- In 1977, Fesl played a singer in the film Die Jugendstreiche des Knaben Karl (about the younger Karl Valentin) and sang in a beergarden from his Bibel-Gstanzl’n (Amen).
- For the made-for-television film Wunderland (1983), the song Ich bin der Räuber Hotzenplotz was written.
- In 1989, Fesl made a guest appearance in the children's series Meister Eder und sein Pumuckl in the episode Pumuckl und die Musik.
- From 1997 to 1998, Fesl worked together with others in 10 episodes of the Austrian Kabarett series Tohuwabohu.
- The documentary from the series Lebenslinien entitled Fredl Fesl: I bin wia i bin (2003) shows the artist's life by using many interviews and clips of his appearances.
