= Haiming =

Haiming may refer to:

- Haiming, Austria
- Haiming, Germany
