= Teising =

- Municipality
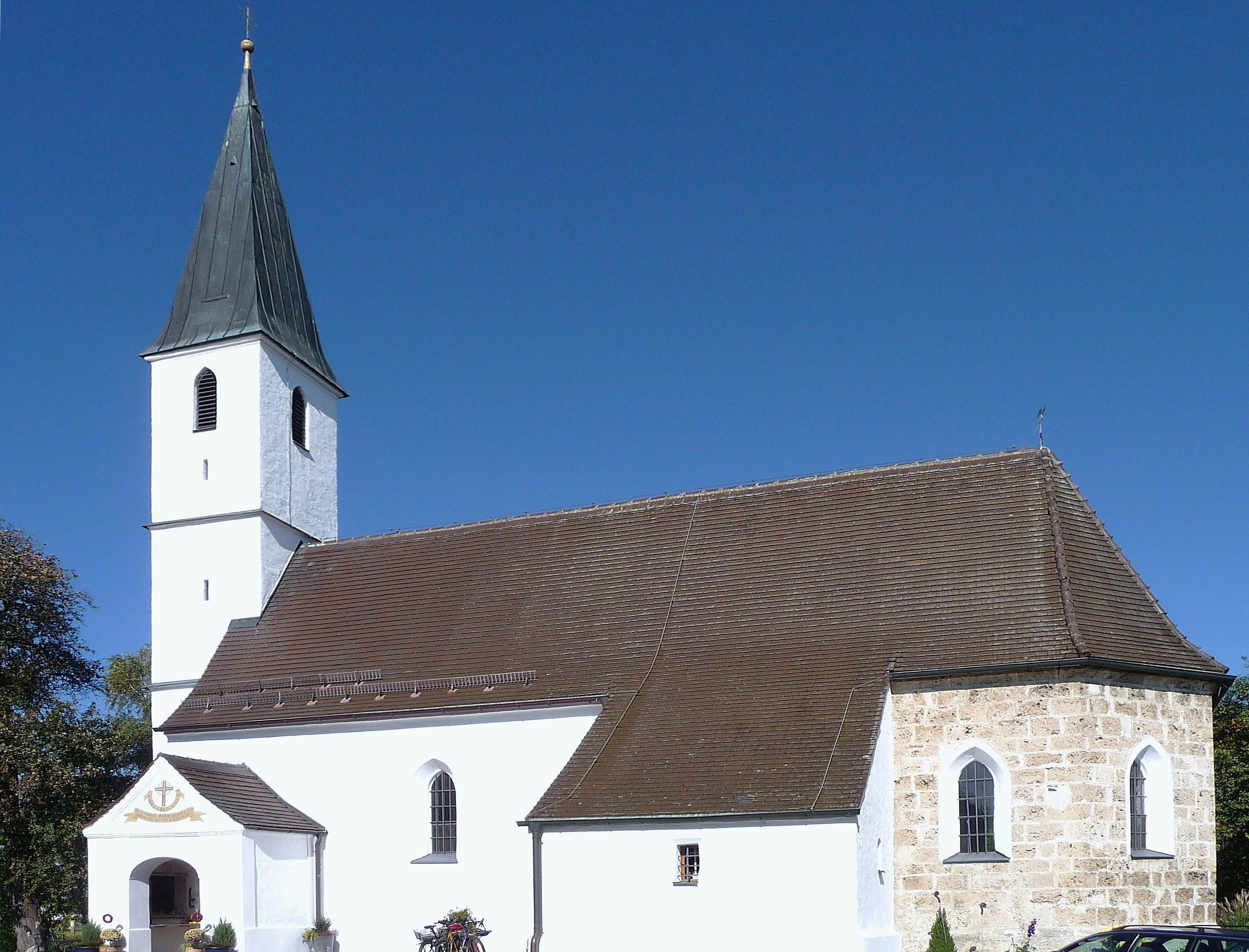
- Church of Saint John the Baptist

- Coat of arms

- Location of Teising within Altötting district
- Interactive map of Teising
- Location within Germany Location within Bavaria
- Coordinates: 48°14′N 12°37′E
- Country: Germany
- State: Bavaria
- Admin. region: Oberbayern
- District: Altötting

Government
  - Mayor (2020–26): Johann Hiebl

Area
  - Total: 5.38 km^{2} (2.08 sq mi)
- Elevation: 405 m (1,329 ft)

Population (2025-12-31)
  - Total: 1,736
  - Density: 323/km^{2} (836/sq mi)
- Time zone: UTC+01:00 (CET)
  - Summer (DST): UTC+02:00 (CEST)
- Postal codes: 84576
- Dialling codes: 08633
- Vehicle registration: AÖ
- Website: www.teising.de

Teising (German pronunciation: [ˈtaɪzɪŋ]) is a municipality in the district of Altötting in Bavaria in Germany and belongs to the parish Burgkirchen am Wald. The village is located very centrally between the towns of Altötting and Mühldorf am Inn. Since 2008 most traffic is rerouted to the nearby freeway A94, which help the village center gain considerably in attractiveness.

Teising is one of the oldest settlements in the area. Its first documented mention dates back to the year AD 710. There is evidence of Celtic settlements close by, of a main Roman road which connected Italy to the northern border of the Noricum province.

Once a dreamy village, it expanded rapidly when local farmers started selling land for new construction in the 1970s. Teising gained nationwide fame in 2000 as "debt-free" village. A recently opened business park has attracted many businesses to Teising, who value its easily accessible location, skilled workforce, and the high recreational value of Upper Bavaria.

Teising has two banks, a bakery, a butcher, two restaurants, two pubs, but no post office.
