= Pleiskirchen =

- Municipality
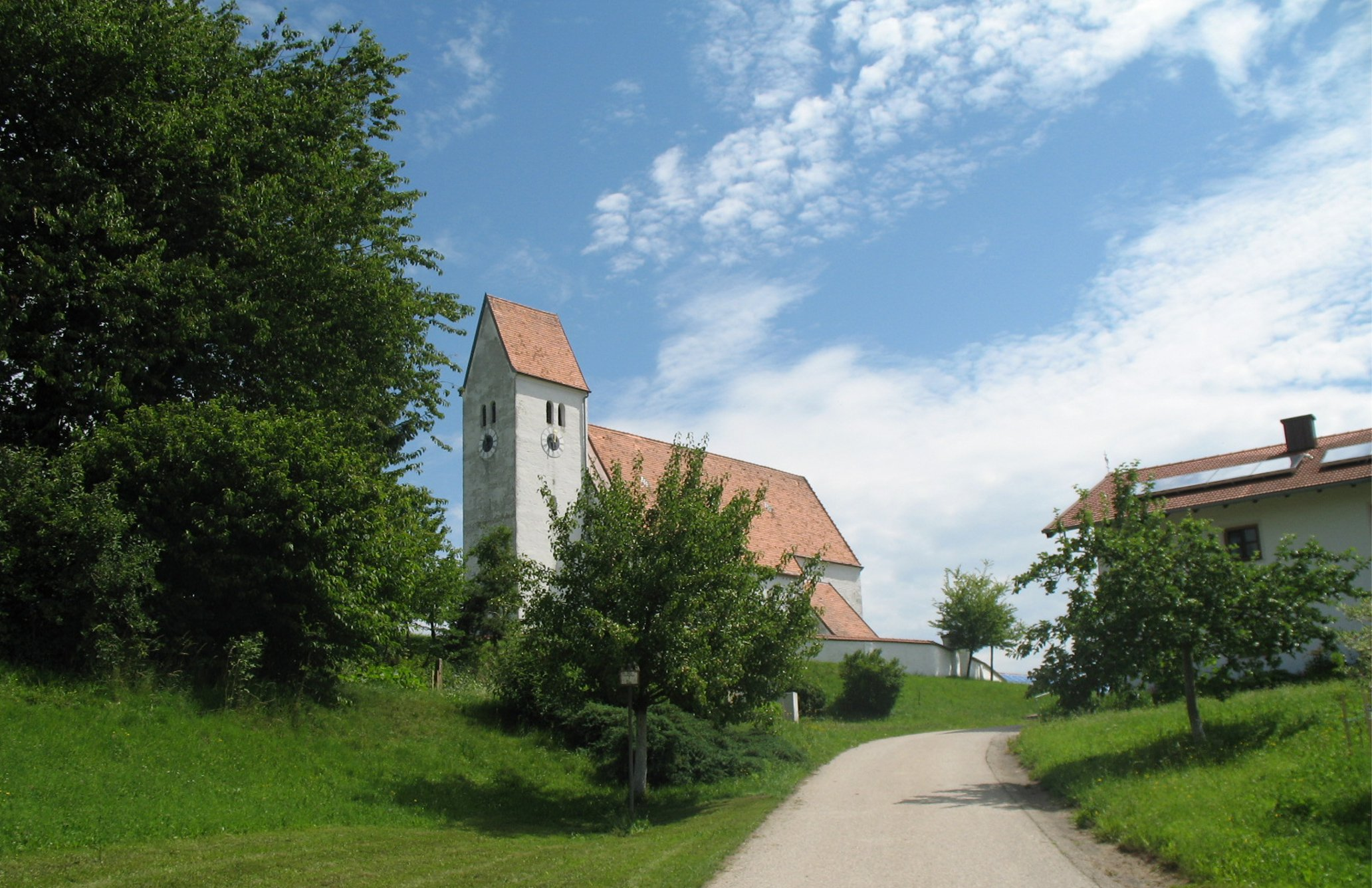
- Church of Saint George in Georgenberg

- Coat of arms

- Location of Pleiskirchen within Altötting district
- Interactive map of Pleiskirchen
- Location within Germany Location within Bavaria
- Coordinates: 48°18′N 12°36′E
- Country: Germany
- State: Bavaria
- Admin. region: Oberbayern
- District: Altötting

Government
  - Mayor (2020–26): Konrad Zeiler (FW)

Area
  - Total: 52.62 km^{2} (20.32 sq mi)
- Elevation: 450 m (1,480 ft)

Population (2025-12-31)
  - Total: 2,432
  - Density: 46.22/km^{2} (119.7/sq mi)
- Time zone: UTC+01:00 (CET)
  - Summer (DST): UTC+02:00 (CEST)
- Postal codes: 84568
- Dialling codes: 08635
- Vehicle registration: AÖ
- Website: www.pleiskirchen.de

Pleiskirchen (German pronunciation: [plaɪsˈkɪʁçn̩]) is a municipality in the district of Altötting in Bavaria in Germany.

== Notable people ==
- Fredl Fesl (1947–2024), Lower Bavarian musician and singer, lived and died at the outlying homestead Häuslaign.
