= Georg Lankensperger =

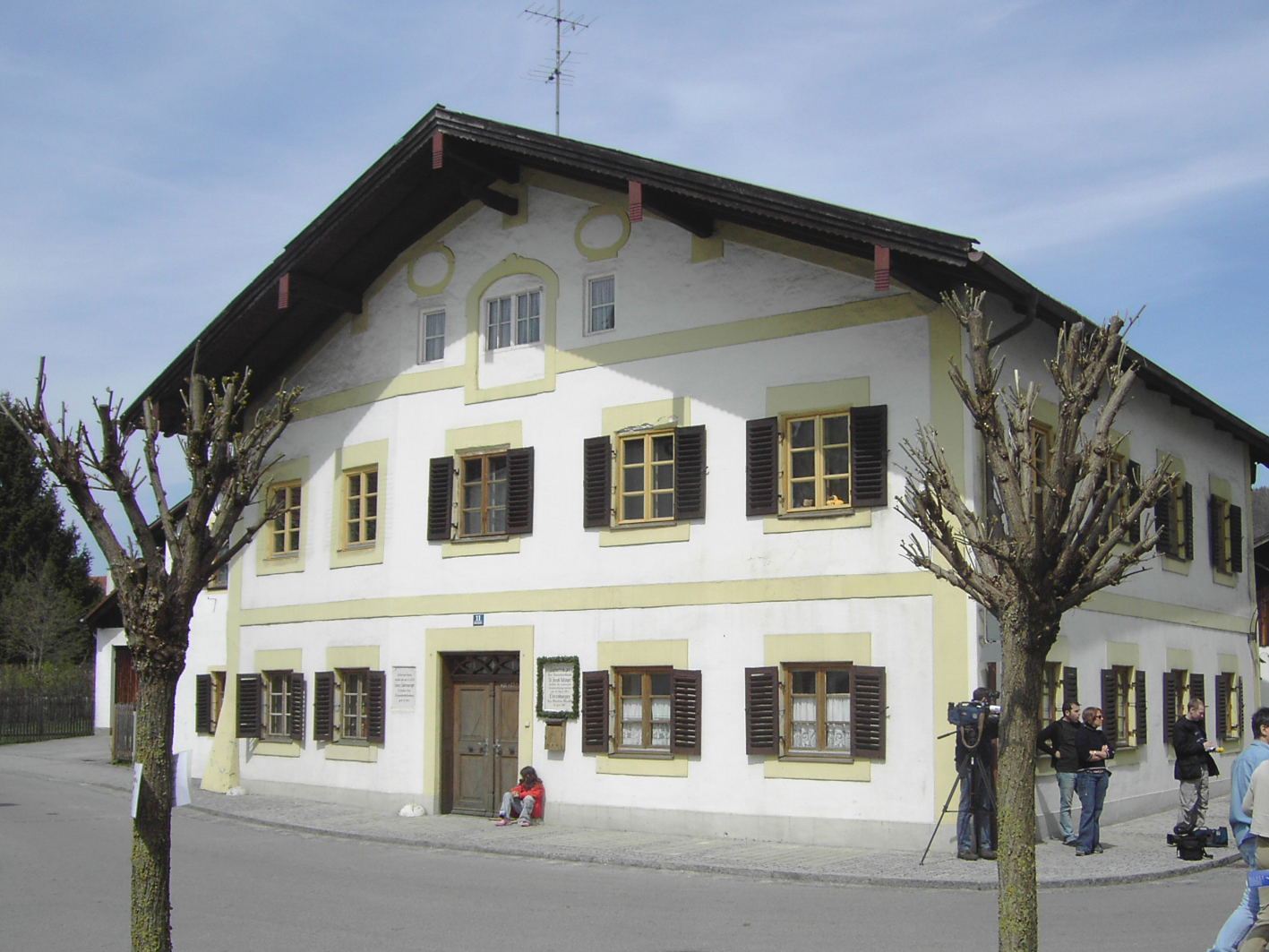
The Mauthaus (Toll house) in Marktl am Inn in the south-east Bavaria. Birthplace of Georg Lankensperger. Also the birthplace of Pope Benedict XVI (Joseph Ratzinger) in 1927.

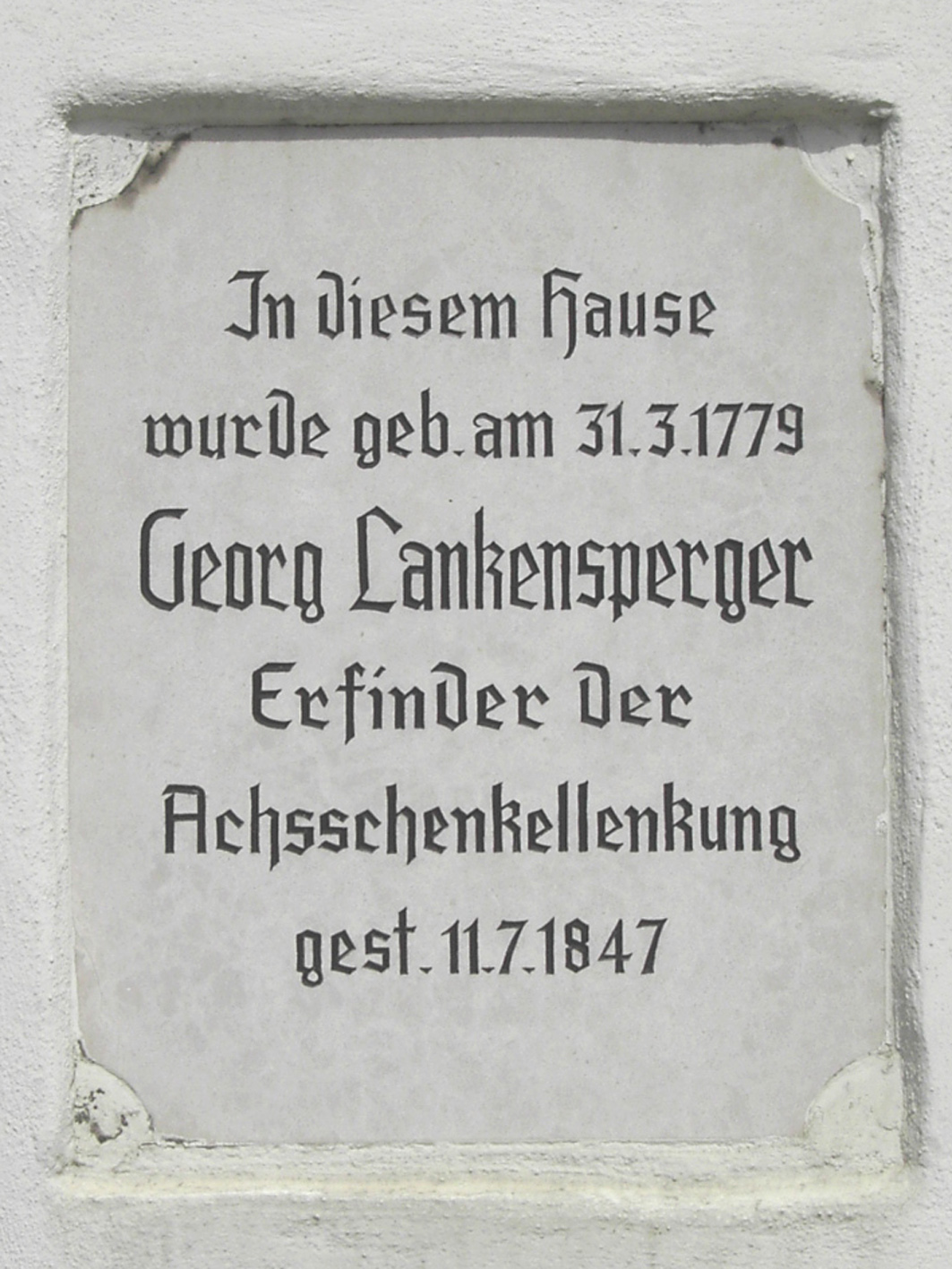
Commemorative plaque at birthplace. .. the inventor of the Ackermann steering.

Georg Lankensperger (also: Lankensberger), (31 March 1779 – 11 July 1847) was a German wheelwright who invented the steering mechanism that is today known as Ackermann steering geometry. He patented the invention in Germany, but his agent Rudolph Ackermann filed for the patent in the U.K.

== Early life ==
Lankensperger was born in Marktl in the district of Oberbayern in Germany.

== Career ==
Lankensperger invented his steering mechanism in 1816 as Hofwagner (Court waggoner) in Munich, to allow the front wheels of a carriage to individually follow the natural arc of its turning circle, rather than skidding and slipping when they are forced to each share a common arc with the conventional pivoted axle. It continues to be used in horse-drawn carriages and passenger cars to this day.

== Death ==
He died at Birkenstein near Berlin.
