= Halsbach =

- Municipality
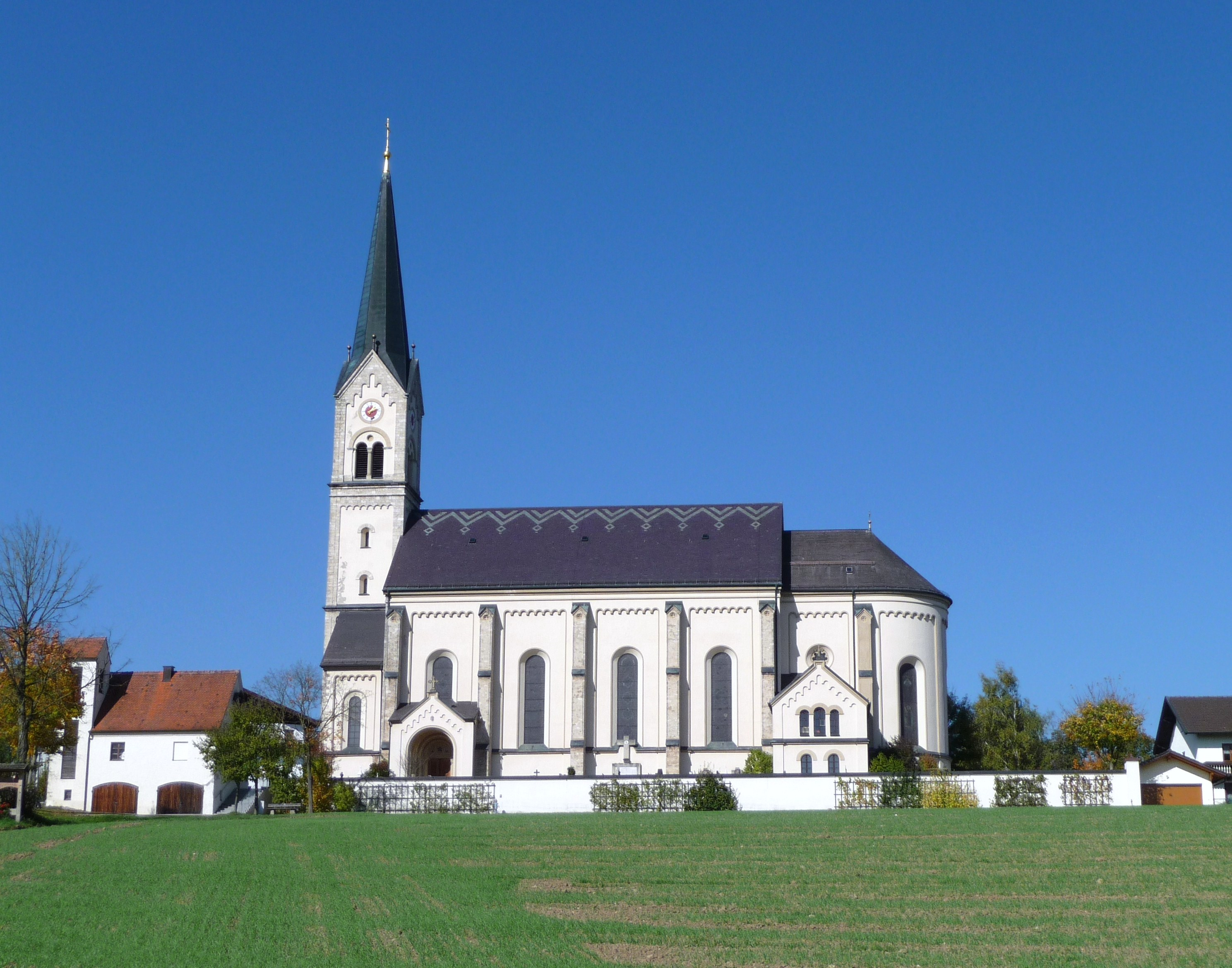
- Saint Martin Church

- Coat of arms

- Location of Halsbach within Altötting district
- Interactive map of Halsbach
- Location within Germany Location within Bavaria
- Coordinates: 48°7′N 12°40′E
- Country: Germany
- State: Bavaria
- Admin. region: Oberbayern
- District: Altötting
- Municipal assoc.: Kirchweidach

Government
  - Mayor (2020–26): Martin Poschner

Area
  - Total: 22.08 km^{2} (8.53 sq mi)
- Elevation: 474 m (1,555 ft)

Population (2025-12-31)
  - Total: 1,066
  - Density: 48.28/km^{2} (125.0/sq mi)
- Time zone: UTC+01:00 (CET)
  - Summer (DST): UTC+02:00 (CEST)
- Postal codes: 84553
- Dialling codes: 08623
- Vehicle registration: AÖ
- Website: www.halsbach.de

Halsbach (German pronunciation: [ˈhalsˌbax]) is a municipality in the district of Altötting in Bavaria in Germany.
