= Kaiser Bräu =

German brewery

Kaiser Bräu GmbH & Co. KG
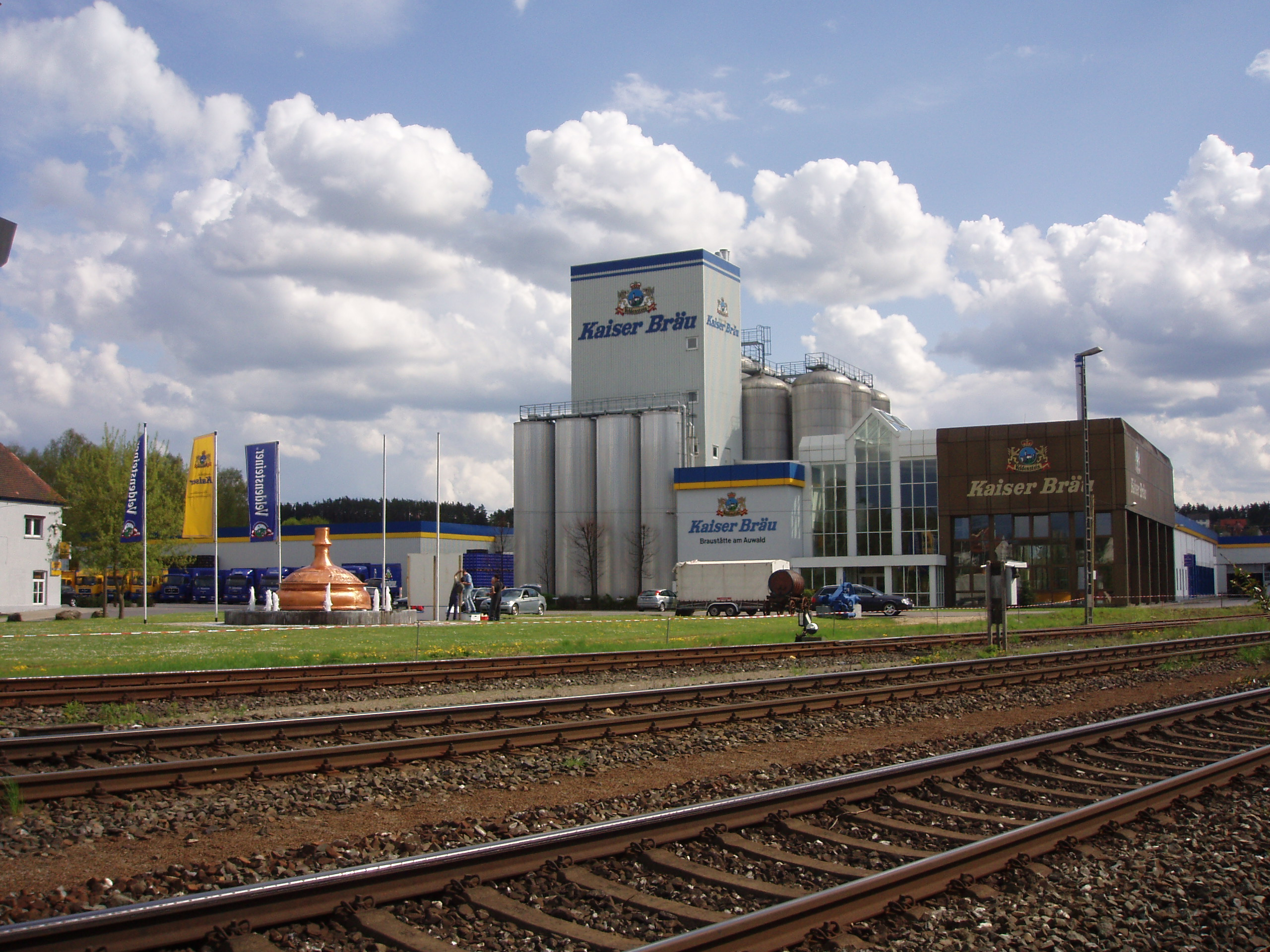
- Type: GmbH & Co. KG
- Location: Neuhaus an der Pegnitz, Germany
- Coordinates: 49°37′39″N 11°33′13″E
- Opened: 1929
- Annual production volume: 500,000 hectolitres (430,000 US bbl)
- Other products: Root Beer, Lemonade
- Website: www.kaiser-braeu.de

The Kaiser Bräu in Neuhaus an der Pegnitz is the largest brewery in the district of Nürnberger Land, Bavaria, Germany.

== History ==
The private brewery was founded in 1929. The annual output rose from 900 hectoliters (1939) to 10,000 hl (1960), 100,000 hl (1979) and 200.000 hl (2008). The new modern brewery built in 1991 has a capacity of 500,000 hl.

Large customers are German discounter and food markets, but they have recently starting exporting to other EU countries and the US. The company has expanded its product base to include rootbeers and the "Frucade" brand lemonade.

== Brands ==
In addition to Pils and wheat, the company offers the dark Veldensteiner Landbier. The brewery also offers a Kellerbier and commercial Zwickelbier.

== Marketing ==
The name Veldensteiner with a logo of the castle Veldenstein in Neuhaus an der Pegnitz is featured prominently on the top of the label. The brand uses "Veldensteiner" on most traditional bottles, while reserving the "Kaiser-Bräu" beers for slim NRW bottles.

For a few years in the early 21st century, Kaiser Bräu's pitchman for its Veldenstein brand in radio advertisements was the well known Bavarian folk singer-songwriter-musician Fredl Fesl.

== Awards ==
In 2017 the Saphirbock a gold medal from the Meininger Award Craft Beer Award.
