= Marktl =

- Municipality
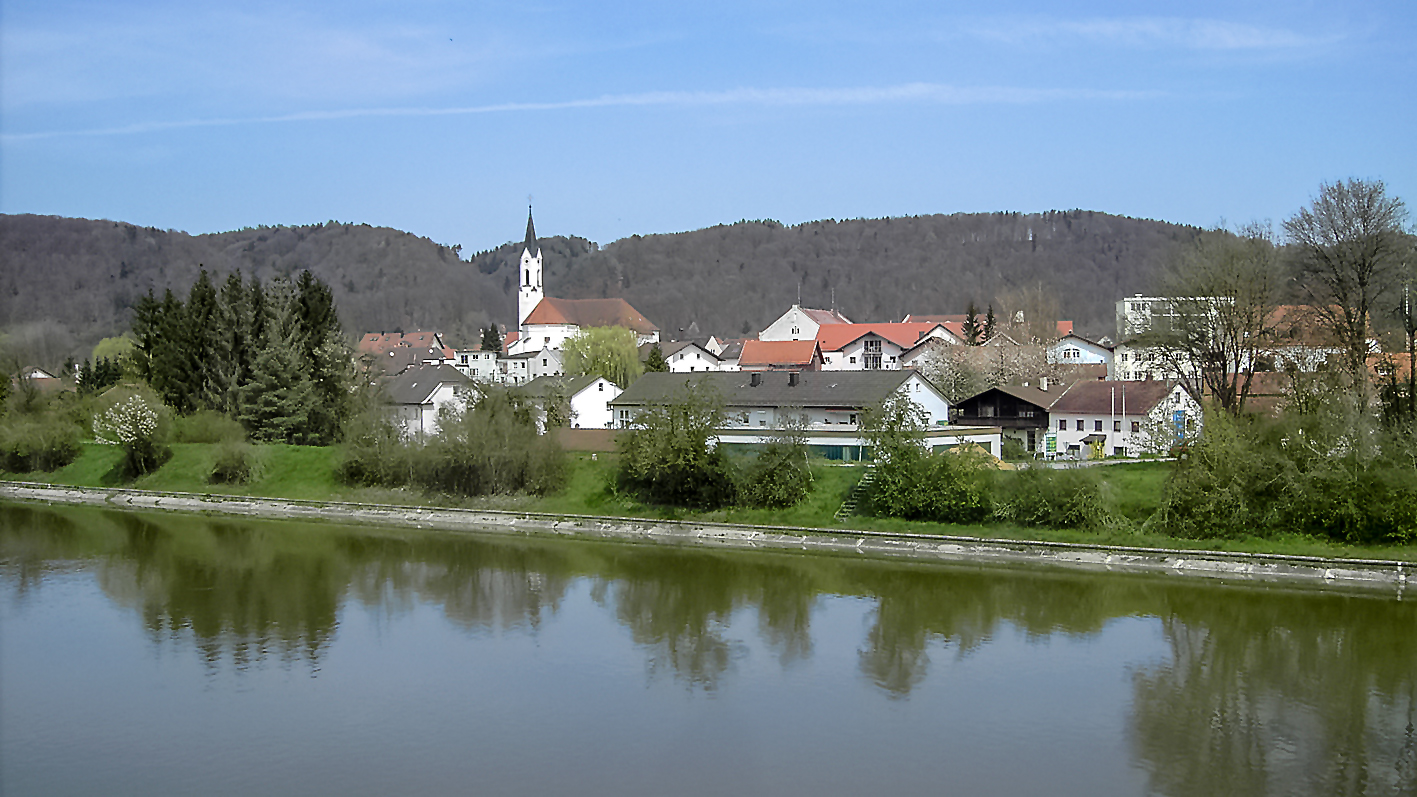
- Marktl am Inn

- Coat of arms

- Location of Marktl within Altötting district
- Interactive map of Marktl
- Location within Germany Location within Bavaria
- Coordinates: 48°15′N 12°51′E
- Country: Germany
- State: Bavaria
- Admin. region: Oberbayern
- District: Altötting
- Municipal assoc.: Marktl
- Subdivisions: 63 Gemeindeteile

Government
  - Mayor (2020–26): Benedikt Dittmann

Area
  - Total: 27.84 km^{2} (10.75 sq mi)
- Elevation: 364 m (1,194 ft)

Population (2025-12-31)
  - Total: 2,784
  - Density: 100.0/km^{2} (259.0/sq mi)
- Time zone: UTC+01:00 (CET)
  - Summer (DST): UTC+02:00 (CEST)
- Postal codes: 84533
- Dialling codes: 08678
- Vehicle registration: AÖ
- Website: www.marktl.de

Marktl (German pronunciation: [ˈmaʁktl̩]), or often unofficially called Marktl am Inn ("little market on the River Inn"), is a village and historic market municipality in the state of Bavaria, Germany, near the Austrian border, in the Altötting district of Upper Bavaria. The most notable neighbouring town is Altötting. Marktl has approximately 2,800 inhabitants.

Marktl is the birthplace of Joseph Alois Ratzinger (1927–2022) who later became Pope Benedict XVI.

== History ==
- 13th century – Established as the power base of the Counts of Leonberg.
- 1297 – Construction of the first church dedicated to Saint Oswald within the diocese of Stammham, it was sponsored by Berengar III, Count of Leonberg and was consecrated by Bishop Albert of Chiemsee.
- 1422 – Duke Henry XVI of Bavaria grants market privileges to the town.
- 1477 – Duke Louis the Rich grants a coat of arms to the citizens of Marktl, showing a ship hook and caper measure, as symbols of navigation and trade
- 1577 – Duke Albert V permits the assignment of a priest to the Marktl branch church
- 1697 – Prince-Elector Max Emanuel arranges the construction of the first bridge across the river Inn at Marktl
- 1701 – Lightning hits the tower of Saint Oswald church, which results in the incineration of the whole market
- 1851 – Marktl, which had been only a subsidiary of the parish of Stammham, becomes an independent parish
- 1857 – Bishop Heinrich von Hofstetter consecrates the newly built parish church of Saint Oswald
- 1871 – Marktl gets a railway station when the railway line from Munich to Simbach is built
- 1919 – Construction of a protective dam on the Inn River as a safeguard against constant flooding
- 1927 – Completion of the first concrete bridge over the Inn and construction of the "Neue Strasse" (New Street) to bypass the market
- 1965 – Remodel of parish church at Saint Oswald; parish hall is built
- 1970–1972 – The formerly independent municipalities of Marktlberg and Schuetzing are incorporated into Marktl
- 1980 – A mechanical-biological water purification plant is built
- 1981–1983 – The Bürgerhaus ("Citizens' House") is built (includes a public library, rooms for events, a skittles alley etc.)
- 1984–1987 – Construction of fire-brigade stations in Marktl and Marktlberg
- 1989 – Connection to Autobahn A 94
- 1996 – Redesign of the market square
- 2000 – Redesign of the square in front of the railway station
- 2005 – Election of Pope Benedict XVI and bottling of commemorative "Papstbier" (Pope beer) by local brewer Weideneder for sale to the public
- 2006 – Visit of Pope Benedict XVI.

== Coat of arms ==
Marktl's coat of arms features a ship's hook and caper measure as symbols of navigation and trade, under the blue and white lozenges of the duchy of Bavaria.

== Twin towns — sister cities ==
Marktl is twinned with:

- Wadowice, Poland (2006, birthplace of Pope John Paul II)
- Gönnheim, Germany
- Sotto il Monte Giovanni XXIII, Italy (2009, birthplace of Pope John XXIII)

== Notable people ==
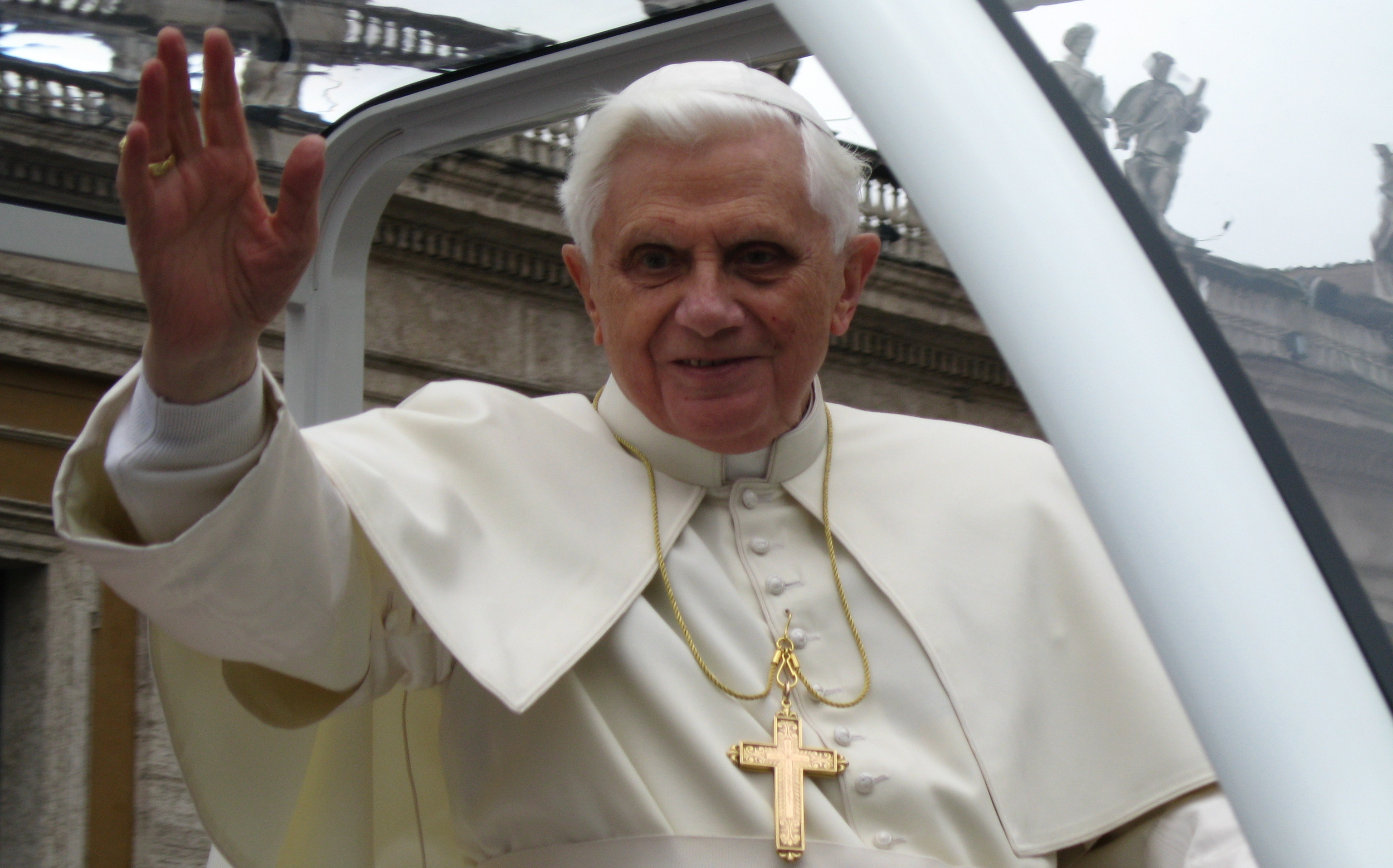
Benedict XVI in 2007

- Pope Benedict XVI (* 1927 as Joseph Aloisius Ratzinger; † 2022)
- Georg Lankensperger (* 1779; † 1847), cartwright
- Paul Devrient (* 1890; † 1973), opera tenor and director
- Hugo Grau (* 1899; † 1984), veterinarian
