= Unterneukirchen (Verwaltungsgemeinschaft) =

- Verwaltungsgemeinschaft
- Location of Unterneukirchen within Altötting district
- Interactive map of Unterneukirchen
- Location within Germany Location within Bavaria
- Coordinates: 48°10′N 12°37′E
- Country: Germany
- State: Bavaria
- Admin. region: Upper Bavaria
- District: Altötting
- Seat: Unterneukirchen
- Subdivisions: 2 municipalities

Area
  - Total: 50.86 km^{2} (19.64 sq mi)

Population (2025-12-31)
  - Total: 6,299
  - Density: 123.8/km^{2} (320.8/sq mi)
- Time zone: UTC+01:00 (CET)
  - Summer (DST): UTC+02:00 (CEST)
- Website: www.unterneukirchen.de

Unterneukirchen is a Verwaltungsgemeinschaft (municipal association) in the district of Altötting in Bavaria, Germany. Its seat is in Unterneukirchen. It consists of the following municipalities:

- Kastl
- Unterneukirchen
