= Reischach (Verwaltungsgemeinschaft) =

- Verwaltungsgemeinschaft
- Location of Reischach within Altötting district
- Interactive map of Reischach
- Location within Germany Location within Bavaria
- Coordinates: 48°17′N 12°44′E
- Country: Germany
- State: Bavaria
- Admin. region: Upper Bavaria
- District: Altötting
- Seat: Reischach
- Subdivisions: 3 municipalities

Area
  - Total: 70.72 km^{2} (27.31 sq mi)

Population (2025-12-31)
  - Total: 5,303
  - Density: 74.99/km^{2} (194.2/sq mi)
- Time zone: UTC+01:00 (CET)
  - Summer (DST): UTC+02:00 (CEST)
- Website: www.vg-reischach.de

Reischach is a Verwaltungsgemeinschaft (municipal association) in the district of Altötting in Bavaria, Germany. Its seat is in Reischach. It consists of the following municipalities:

- Erlbach
- Perach
- Reischach
