= SV Erlbach =

German football club

- Full name: Sportverein Erlbach e. V.
- Founded: 1963
- Ground: Raiffeisen Sportpark
- Capacity: 1,500
- Chairman: Peter Lengdobler
- Manager: Robert Berg
- League: Bayernliga Süd (V)
- 2025–26: Bayernliga Süd, 5th of 17
Home colours

SV Erlbach is a German association football club from the municipality of Erlbach, Bavaria. The club's greatest success has been winning the southern division of the tier five Bayernliga in 2024.

== History ==
Formed in 1963, SV Erlbach played, for the most part of its history as a lower amateur side. The club won promotion of the Bezirksliga Oberbayern-Ost in 2004 and played at this level for two seasons before achieving another promotion, now to the tier six Bezirksoberliga Oberbayern. Der erfolgreichste Spieler war Bernhard Waldher. Erlbach played the next five seasons at this level, with two sixth places as its best results but was relegated again in 2011. Erlbach returned to the Bezirksliga for the next two seasons, finishing runners-up in 2012 and winning the league the season after. The latter earned it promotion to the Landesliga for the first time.

Erlbach played in the tier six Landesliga Bayern-Südost for the next two seasons, coming third in its first year there. In 2014–15 the club finished runners-up in the league and, after defeating SpVgg Landshut and FV Illertiseen II in the play-offs, was promoted to the southern division of the Bayernliga for the first time. SVE had to enter the relegation round after its inaugural Bayernliga season and, after two defeats against TSV Landsberg, was initially relegated back to the Landesliga but awarded another chance to stay in the Bayernliga through a play-off against VfL Frohnlach. Losing on aggregate to Frohnlach Erlbach was relegated back to the Landesliga.

== Honours ==
The club's honours:

- Bayernliga Süd (V)
  - Champions: 2024
- Landesliga Bayern-Südost (VI)
  - Champions: 2022
  - Runners-up: 2015
- Bezirksliga Oberbayern-Ost (VII)
  - Champions: 2006, 2013
  - Runners-up: 2005

== Recent seasons ==
The recent season-by-season performance of the club:

Season	Division	Tier	Position
2004–05	Bezirksliga Oberbayern-Ost	VII	2nd
2005–06	Bezirksliga Oberbayern-Ost	VII	1st ↑
2006–07	Bezirksoberliga Oberbayern	VI	12th
2007–08	Bezirksoberliga Oberbayern	VI	6th
2008–09	Bezirksoberliga Oberbayern	VII	13th
2009–10	Bezirksoberliga Oberbayern	VII	6th
2010–11	Bezirksoberliga Oberbayern	VII	13th ↓
2011–12	Bezirksliga Oberbayern-Ost	VII	5th
2012–13	Bezirksliga Oberbayern-Ost	VII	1st ↑
2013–14	Landesliga Bayern-Südost	VI	3rd
2014–15	Landesliga Bayern-Südost	VI	2nd ↑
2015–16	Bayernliga Süd	V	17th ↓
2016–17	Landesliga Bayern-Südost	VI	

- With the introduction of the Regionalligas in 1994 and the 3. Liga in 2008 as the new third tier, below the 2. Bundesliga, all leagues below dropped one tier.

↑ Promoted	↓ Relegated
