= Kirchweidach (Verwaltungsgemeinschaft) =

- Verwaltungsgemeinschaft
- Location of Kirchweidach within Altötting district
- Interactive map of Kirchweidach
- Location within Germany Location within Bavaria
- Coordinates: 48°05′N 12°38′E
- Country: Germany
- State: Bavaria
- Admin. region: Upper Bavaria
- District: Altötting
- Seat: Kirchweidach
- Subdivisions: 4 municipalities

Area
  - Total: 80.7 km^{2} (31.2 sq mi)

Population (2025-12-31)
  - Total: 6,396
  - Density: 79.3/km^{2} (205/sq mi)
- Time zone: UTC+01:00 (CET)
  - Summer (DST): UTC+02:00 (CEST)
- Website: www.vg-kirchweidach.de

Kirchweidach is a Verwaltungsgemeinschaft (municipal association) in the district of Altötting in Bavaria, Germany. Its seat is in Kirchweidach. It consists of the following municipalities:

- Feichten
- Halsbach
- Kirchweidach
- Tyrlaching
