= Stammham, Altötting =

Stammham
- Municipality
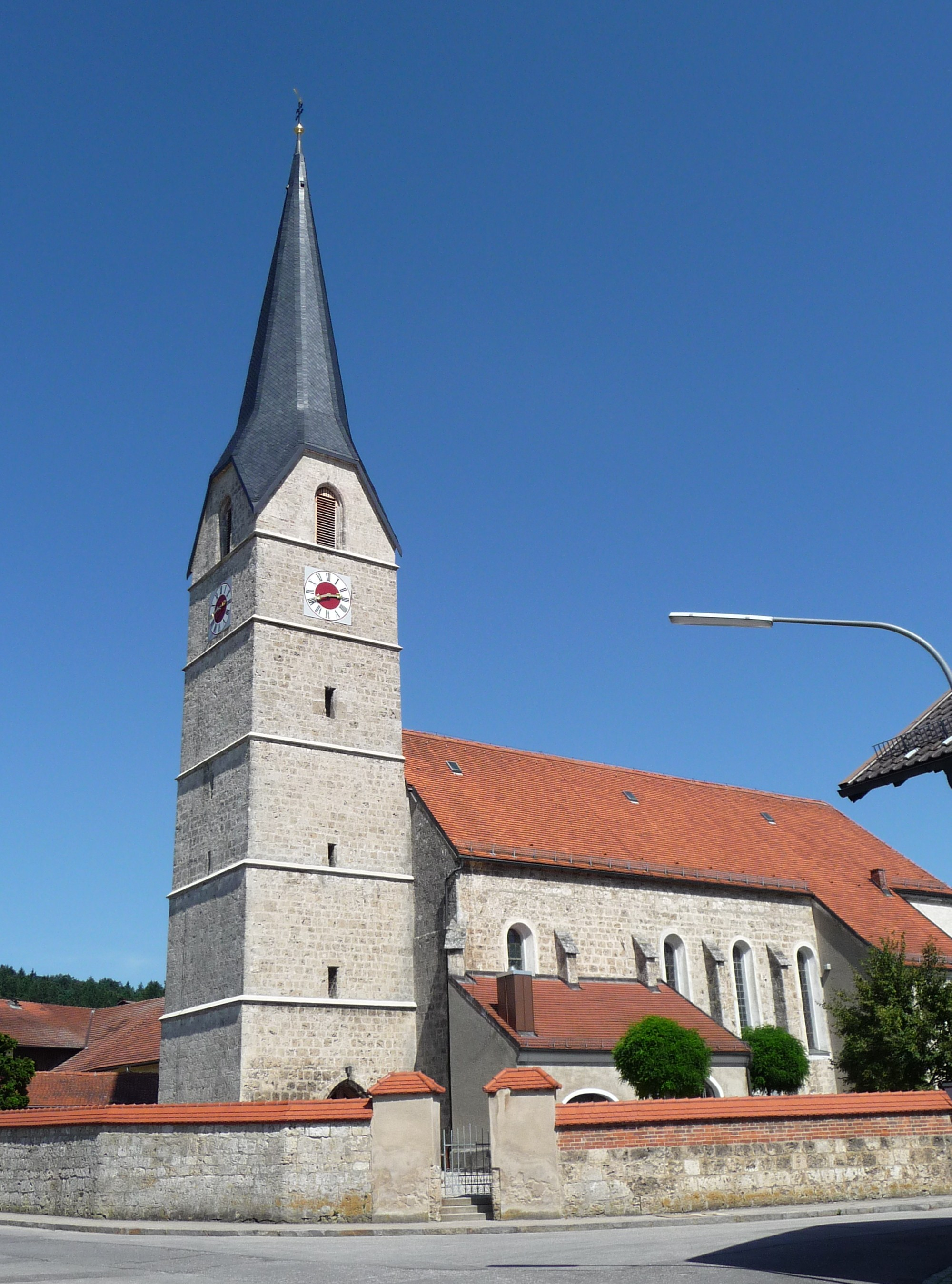
- Church of Saint Lawrence

- Coat of arms

- Location of Stammham within Altötting district
- Interactive map of Stammham
- Location within Germany Location within Bavaria
- Coordinates: 48°15′N 12°53′E
- Country: Germany
- State: Bavaria
- Admin. region: Oberbayern
- District: Altötting
- Municipal assoc.: Marktl

Government
  - Mayor (2020–26): Franz Lehner (CSU)

Area
  - Total: 5.68 km^{2} (2.19 sq mi)
- Elevation: 369 m (1,211 ft)

Population (2025-12-31)
  - Total: 994
  - Density: 175/km^{2} (453/sq mi)
- Time zone: UTC+01:00 (CET)
  - Summer (DST): UTC+02:00 (CEST)
- Postal codes: 84533
- Dialling codes: 08678
- Vehicle registration: AÖ
- Website: gemeinde-stammham.de

Stammham (German pronunciation: [ˈʃtamham]) is the smallest municipality in the district of Altötting in Bavaria in Germany. It lies on the river Inn, close to Marktl, the birthplace of Pope Benedict XVI.
