= Reischach =

- Municipality
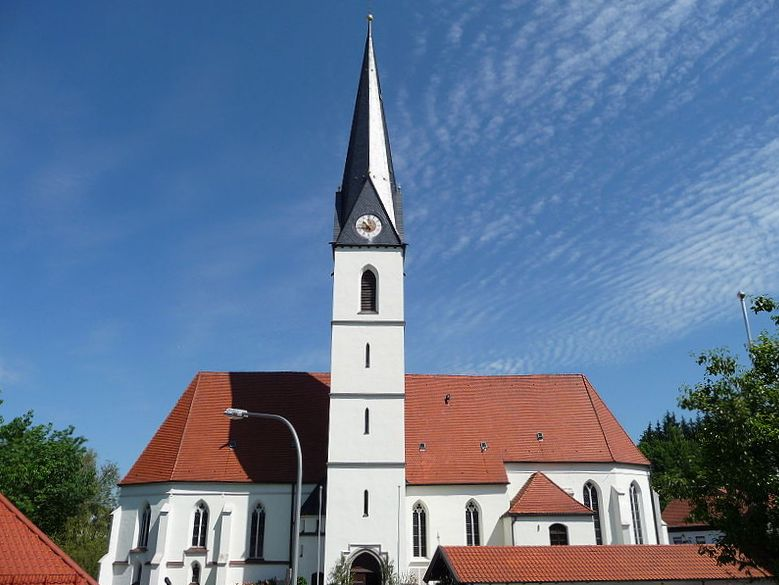
- Church of Saint Martin

- Coat of arms

- Location of Reischach within Altötting district
- Interactive map of Reischach
- Location within Germany Location within Bavaria
- Coordinates: 48°17′N 12°44′E
- Country: Germany
- State: Bavaria
- Admin. region: Oberbayern
- District: Altötting
- Municipal assoc.: Reischach

Government
  - Mayor (2020–26): Alfred Stockner (CSU)

Area
  - Total: 28.46 km^{2} (10.99 sq mi)
- Elevation: 412 m (1,352 ft)

Population (2025-12-31)
  - Total: 2,765
  - Density: 97.15/km^{2} (251.6/sq mi)
- Time zone: UTC+01:00 (CET)
  - Summer (DST): UTC+02:00 (CEST)
- Postal codes: 84571
- Dialling codes: 08670
- Vehicle registration: AÖ
- Website: www.reischach.de

Reischach (German pronunciation: [ˈʁaɪʃax]; Central Bavarian: Reischoch) is a municipality in the district of Altötting in Bavaria in Germany.
