= Feichten =

Feichten an der Alz
- Municipality
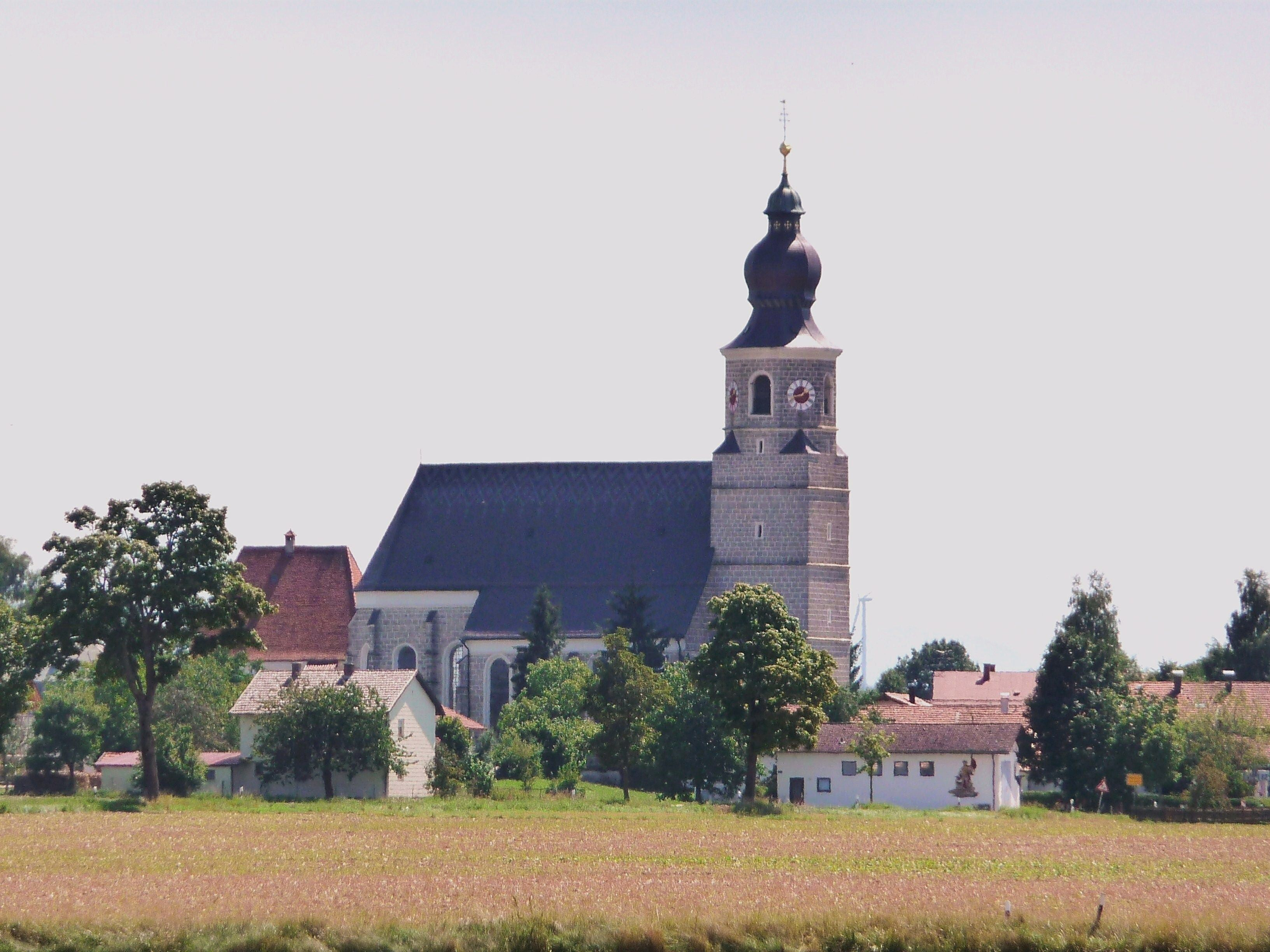
- Church of the Assumption of the Virgin Mary

- Coat of arms

- Location of Feichten an der Alz within Altötting district
- Interactive map of Feichten an der Alz
- Location within Germany Location within Bavaria
- Coordinates: 48°5′N 12°36′E
- Country: Germany
- State: Bavaria
- Admin. region: Oberbayern
- District: Altötting
- Municipal assoc.: Kirchweidach

Government
  - Mayor (2020–26): Johann Vordermaier

Area
  - Total: 17.92 km^{2} (6.92 sq mi)
- Elevation: 518 m (1,699 ft)

Population (2025-12-31)
  - Total: 1,366
  - Density: 76.23/km^{2} (197.4/sq mi)
- Time zone: UTC+01:00 (CET)
  - Summer (DST): UTC+02:00 (CEST)
- Postal codes: 84550
- Dialling codes: 08623
- Vehicle registration: AÖ
- Website: www.feichten.de

Feichten an der Alz (German pronunciation: [ˈfaɪçtn̩ ʔan deːɐ̯ ˈʔalts], lit. 'Feichten on the Alz') is a municipality in the district of Altötting in Bavaria in Germany.
