= Hugo Grau =

German veterinarian (1899–1984)

Hugo Grau (Marktl, 15 April 1899 - 27 June 1984) was a German veterinarian and animal anatomist.

He was the co-founder of the World Association of Veterinary Anatomists and the European Association of Veterinary Anatomists.

In 1933 Grau signed the Vow of allegiance of the Professors of the German Universities and High-Schools to Adolf Hitler and the National Socialistic State.

In 1943, Grau co-edited the 18th and last edition of the "Ellenberger-Baum Handbuch der vergleichenden Anatomie der Haustiere" (Handbook of Comparative Anatomy of Domestic Animals) with Otto Zietzschmann and Eberhardt Ackerknecht.

== Literatural works ==
- Grundriss der Histologie und vergleichenden mikroskopischen Anatomie der Haussäugetiere (with P. Walter), 1968
- Lehrbuch der Histologie und vergleichenden mikroskopischen Anatomie der Haustiere (with O. Knöling), ^{10}1960
