= Marktl (Verwaltungsgemeinschaft) =

- Verwaltungsgemeinschaft
- Location of Marktl within Altötting district
- Interactive map of Marktl
- Location within Germany Location within Bavaria
- Coordinates: 48°15′N 12°51′E
- Country: Germany
- State: Bavaria
- Admin. region: Upper Bavaria
- District: Altötting
- Seat: Marktl
- Subdivisions: 2 municipalities

Area
  - Total: 33.52 km^{2} (12.94 sq mi)

Population (2025-12-31)
  - Total: 3,778
  - Density: 112.7/km^{2} (291.9/sq mi)
- Time zone: UTC+01:00 (CET)
  - Summer (DST): UTC+02:00 (CEST)
- Website: www.vg-marktl-stammham.de

Marktl is a Verwaltungsgemeinschaft (municipal association) in the district of Altötting in Bavaria, Germany. Its seat is in Marktl. It consists of the following municipalities:

- Marktl
- Stammham
