= Ronald Schmidt (footballer) =

German footballer

Personal information
- Date of birth: 28 April 1977 (age 49)
- Place of birth: Freital, East Germany
- Position: Midfielder

Team information
- Current team: SV Erlbach

Youth career
- 1981–1994: Stahl Freital
- 1994–1996: Dresdner SC

Senior career*
Years	Team	Apps	(Gls)
1996–1998	Dresdner SC		
1998–2000	VFC Plauen	46	(6)
2000–2002	Dresdner SC	66	(4)
2002–2013	Wacker Burghausen	277	(27)
2013–2015	SV Erlbach	58	(11)
- * Club domestic league appearances and goals as of 1st July 2015

Ronald Schmidt (born 28 April 1977) is a German former professional footballer who was a midfielder. He played for 11 years for SV Wacker Burghausen, scoring 27 goals in 277 appearances. In his first season at Wacker, he contributed to the club's promotion to the 2. Bundesliga. Before that, he played for Dresdner SC.

He most recently played for SV Erlbach, retiring from football in 2015.
