= Kirchweidach =

- Municipality
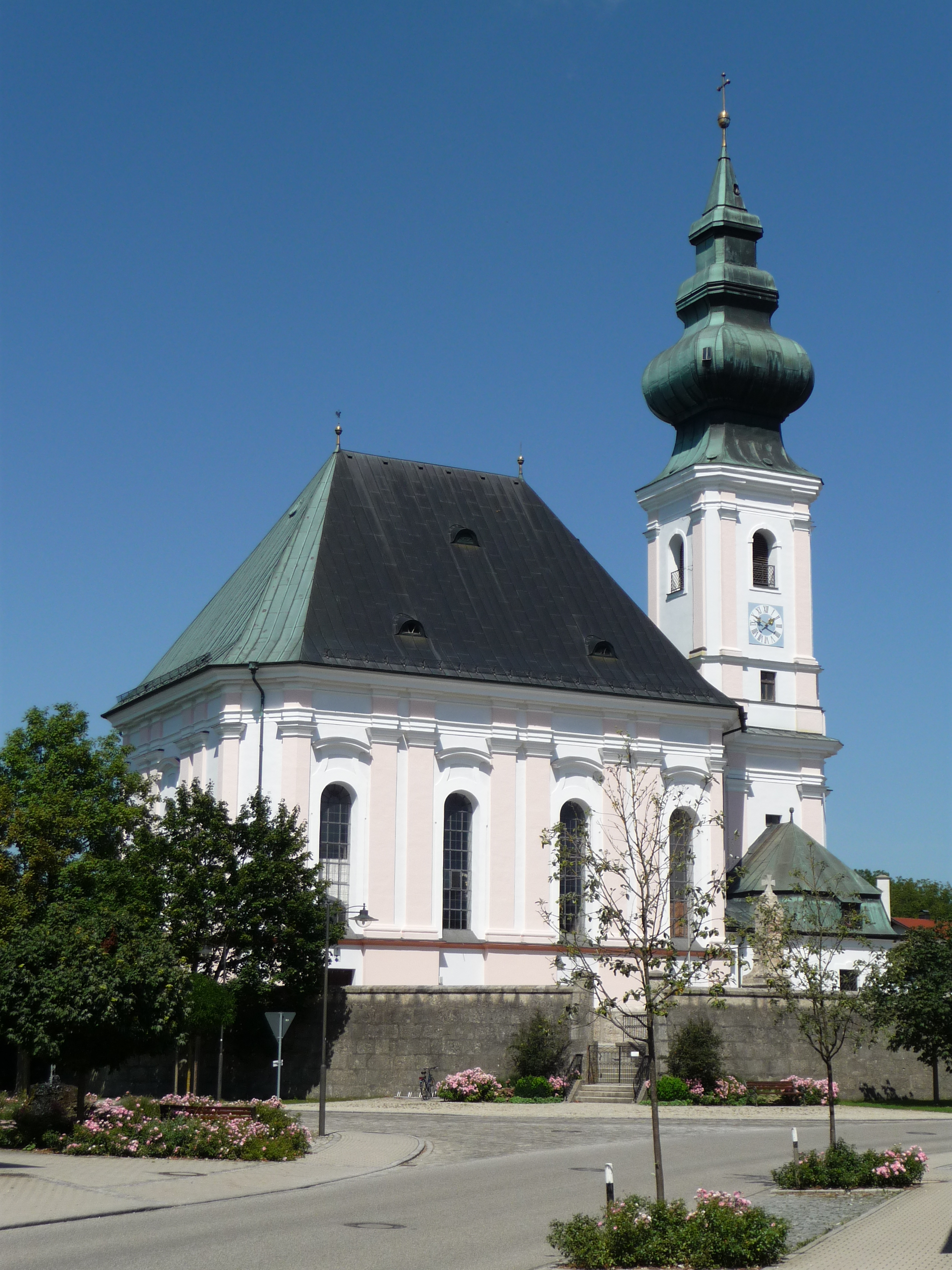
- Parish Church of Saints Vitus, Leonard and George

- Coat of arms

- Location of Kirchweidach within Altötting district
- Interactive map of Kirchweidach
- Location within Germany Location within Bavaria
- Coordinates: 48°5′N 12°38′E
- Country: Germany
- State: Bavaria
- Admin. region: Oberbayern
- District: Altötting
- Municipal assoc.: Kirchweidach

Government
  - Mayor (2020–26): Robert Moser

Area
  - Total: 20.15 km^{2} (7.78 sq mi)
- Elevation: 503 m (1,650 ft)

Population (2025-12-31)
  - Total: 2,907
  - Density: 144.3/km^{2} (373.7/sq mi)
- Time zone: UTC+01:00 (CET)
  - Summer (DST): UTC+02:00 (CEST)
- Postal codes: 84558
- Dialling codes: 08623
- Vehicle registration: AÖ
- Website: www.kirchweidach.de

Kirchweidach (German pronunciation: [ˈkɪʁçvaɪdax]; Central Bavarian: Kiaweidá) is a municipality in the district of Altötting in Bavaria in Germany. It is known for its high level of barn owls and is frequently visited by barn owl enthusiasts in search of their favourite birds.

== Notable people ==
- Sebastian Wieser (1879–1937), German Roman Catholic priest and author
- Matthäus Kaiser (1924–2011), German Roman Catholic theologist and religious law expert
- Hermann Unterstöger (* 1943), German journalist
