= Rainbichl (Tyrlaching) =

Mountain in Germany

Highest point
- Elevation: 544 m (1,785 ft)
- Coordinates: 48°03′54″N 12°40′07″E

Geography
- Location: Bavaria, Germany

Rainbichl (Tyrlaching) is a mountain of Bavaria, Germany.
