= Erlbach, Bavaria =

Erlbach
- Municipality
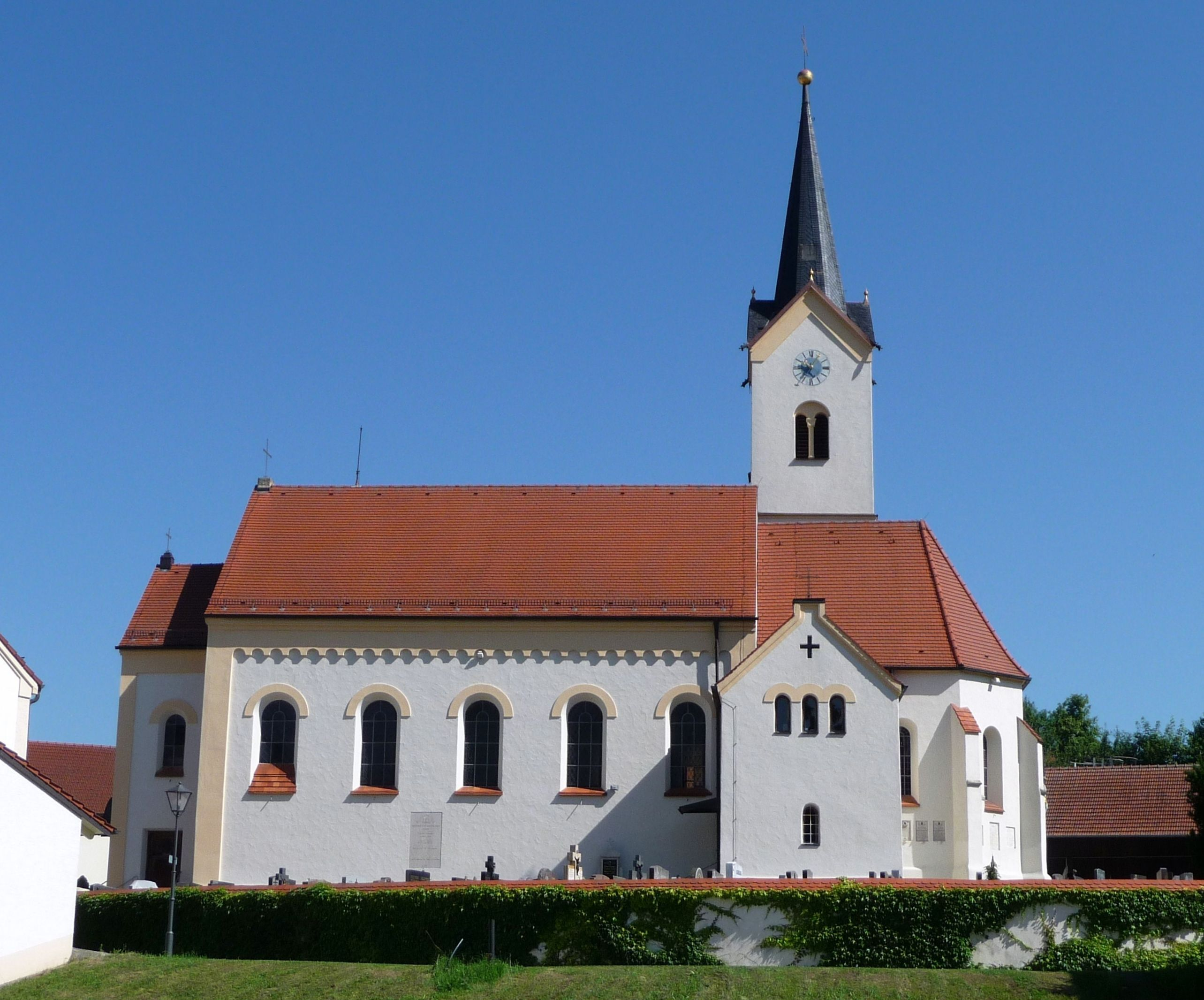
- Saint Peter Church

- Coat of arms

- Location of Erlbach within Altötting district
- Interactive map of Erlbach
- Location within Germany Location within Bavaria
- Coordinates: 48°18′N 12°47′E
- Country: Germany
- State: Bavaria
- Admin. region: Oberbayern
- District: Altötting
- Municipal assoc.: Reischach
- Subdivisions: 84 Gemeindeteile

Government
  - Mayor (2020–26): Monika Meyer

Area
  - Total: 28.13 km^{2} (10.86 sq mi)
- Elevation: 453 m (1,486 ft)

Population (2025-12-31)
  - Total: 1,187
  - Density: 42.20/km^{2} (109.3/sq mi)
- Time zone: UTC+01:00 (CET)
  - Summer (DST): UTC+02:00 (CEST)
- Postal codes: 84567
- Dialling codes: 08670
- Vehicle registration: AÖ
- Website: www.erlbach.de

Erlbach (German pronunciation: [ˈɛʁlbax]) is a municipality in the district of Altötting in Bavaria in Germany.
