= Altötting (district) =

Coordinates: 48°15′N 12°45′E

- District
- Flag Coat of arms
- Country: Germany
- State: Bavaria
- Adm. region: Upper Bavaria
- Capital: Altötting

Government
  - District admin.: Erwin Schneider (CSU)

Area
  - Total: 569.41 km^{2} (219.85 sq mi)

Population (31 December 2025)
  - Total: 113,775
  - Density: 199.81/km^{2} (517.51/sq mi)
- Time zone: UTC+01:00 (CET)
  - Summer (DST): UTC+02:00 (CEST)
- Vehicle registration: AÖ, LF
- Website: www.lra-aoe.de

Altötting (German pronunciation: [altˈʔœtɪŋ]; Bavarian: Oidäding) is a Landkreis (district) in Bavaria, Germany. It is bounded by (from the east and clockwise) Austria and the Bavarian districts of Traunstein, Mühldorf and Rottal-Inn.

== History ==
Altötting was one of the original parts of Bavaria. It was settled by Bavarian tribes shortly after the retreat of the Romans. During the rule of duke Tassilo III (748-788) the place of Ötting was mentioned for the first time (the towns of Altötting and Neuötting are derived from that place). Soon in the 9th century the region became a religious centre with famous churches and monasteries. In the 15th century it became a place of pilgrimage.

The district of Altötting was established in 1837. Pope Benedict XVI was born here 1927 in the village of Marktl.

The hearts of many of the rulers of Bavaria are buried in the Chapel of Grace in the middle of the town square.

== Geography ==
The district is located in the alpine upland on the Austrian border. The main axis of the region is the river Inn, which crosses the district from west to east. It is joined by two large tributaries, the Alz coming from the south and the Salzach, which forms the eastern border of the district. In addition there are several smaller rivers and brooks. The district once was covered with deciduous forests, but is now mainly agriculturally used. However, there are some nature reserves along the lower Alz River and at the mouth of the Salzach River.

== Coat of arms ==
The coat of arms displays:

- left: the pilgrimage Chapel of Grace in the town of Altötting
- right: the blue and white checked pattern of Bavaria

== Towns and municipalities ==
Clickable map of towns and municipalities in the district

Towns
- Altötting
- Burghausen
- Neuötting
- Töging am Inn
Märkte
- Tüßling
Municipalities
- Burgkirchen
- Garching an der Alz
- Haiming
- Pleiskirchen
- Teising
- Winhöring

Verwaltungsgemeinschaften
1. Emmerting; Emmerting^{1}; Mehring	2. Kirchweidach; Feichten; Halsbach; Kirchweidach^{1}; Tyrlaching	3. Marktl; Marktl^{1,2}; Stammham	4. Reischach; Erlbach; Perach; Reischach^{1}	5. Unterneukirchen; Kastl; Unterneukirchen^{1}
^{1}seat of the Verwaltungsgemeinschaft; ^{2}Markt
