= Unterneukirchen =

- Municipality
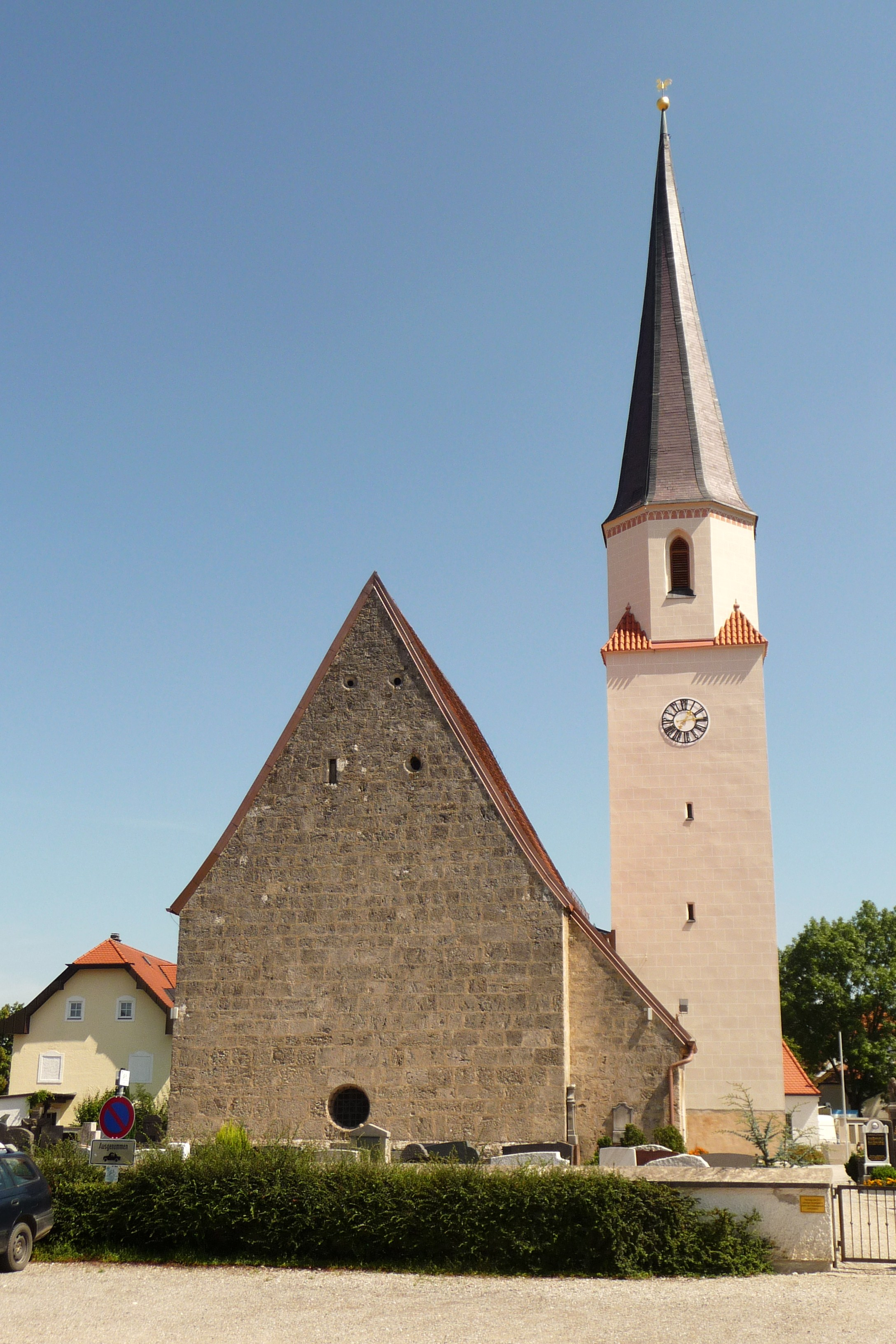
- Church of Saint John the Evangelist and Saint Aegidius

- Coat of arms

- Location of Unterneukirchen within Altötting district
- Interactive map of Unterneukirchen
- Location within Germany Location within Bavaria
- Coordinates: 48°09′54.49″N 12°37′7.27″E
- Country: Germany
- State: Bavaria
- Admin. region: Oberbayern
- District: Altötting
- Municipal assoc.: Unterneukirchen

Government
  - Mayor (2020–26): Jochen Englmeier

Area
  - Total: 23.26 km^{2} (8.98 sq mi)
- Elevation: 460 m (1,510 ft)

Population (2025-12-31)
  - Total: 3,486
  - Density: 149.9/km^{2} (388.2/sq mi)
- Time zone: UTC+01:00 (CET)
  - Summer (DST): UTC+02:00 (CEST)
- Postal codes: 84579
- Dialling codes: 08634
- Vehicle registration: AÖ
- Website: www.unterneukirchen.de

Unterneukirchen is a municipality in the district of Altötting in Bavaria in Germany.
