= Perach =

- Municipality
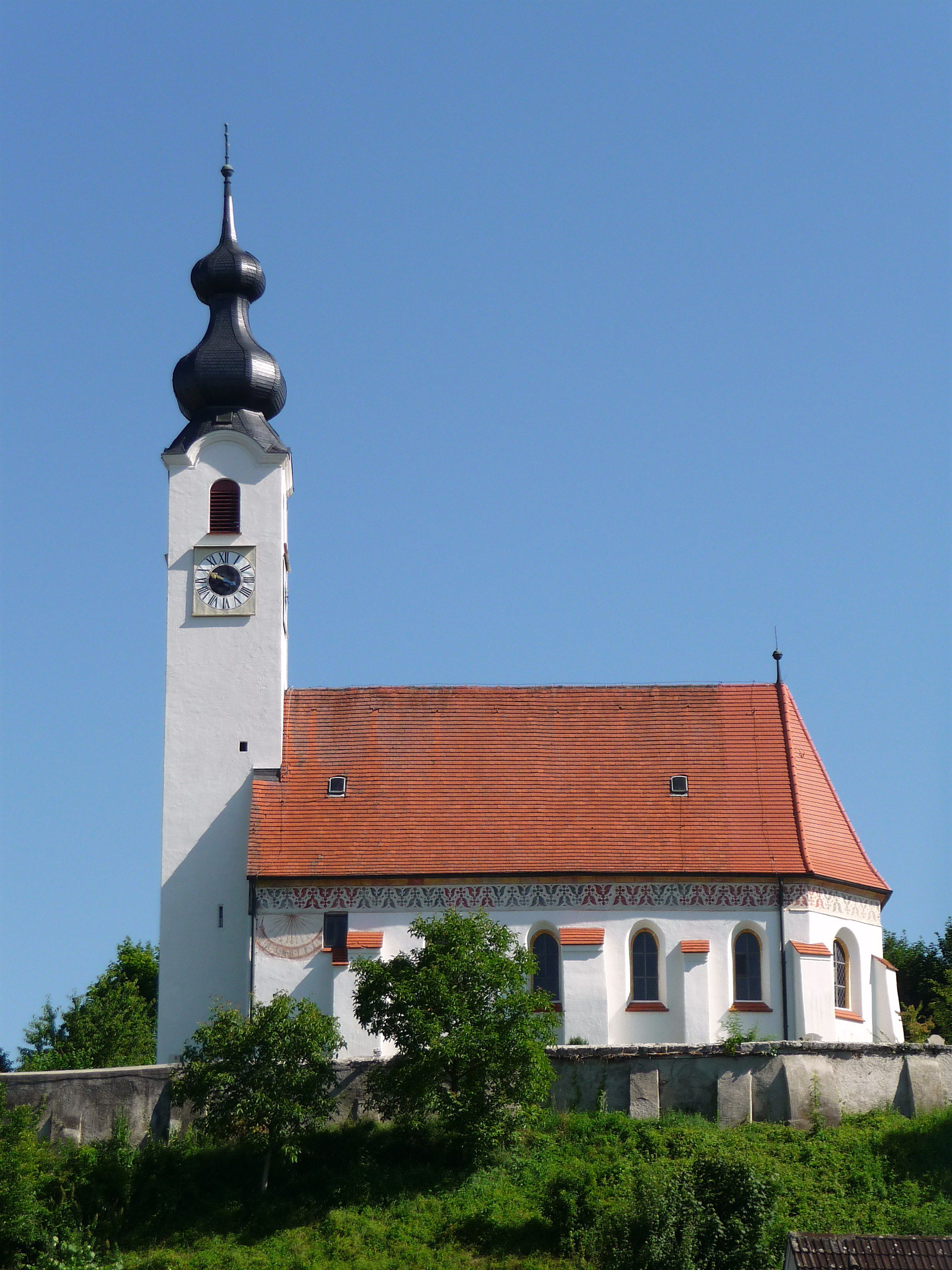
- Church of the Assumption of the Virgin Mary

- Coat of arms

- Location of Perach within Altötting district
- Interactive map of Perach
- Location within Germany Location within Bavaria
- Coordinates: 48°16′N 12°46′E
- Country: Germany
- State: Bavaria
- Admin. region: Oberbayern
- District: Altötting
- Municipal assoc.: Reischach

Government
  - Mayor (2020–26): Georg Eder

Area
  - Total: 14.13 km^{2} (5.46 sq mi)
- Elevation: 380 m (1,250 ft)

Population (2025-12-31)
  - Total: 1,351
  - Density: 95.61/km^{2} (247.6/sq mi)
- Time zone: UTC+01:00 (CET)
  - Summer (DST): UTC+02:00 (CEST)
- Postal codes: 84567
- Dialling codes: 08670
- Vehicle registration: AÖ
- Website: www.perach.de

Perach (German pronunciation: [ˈpeːʁax]) is a municipality in the district of Altötting in Bavaria in Germany. It lies on the river Inn.
