= Kastl, Upper Bavaria =

Kastl
- Municipality
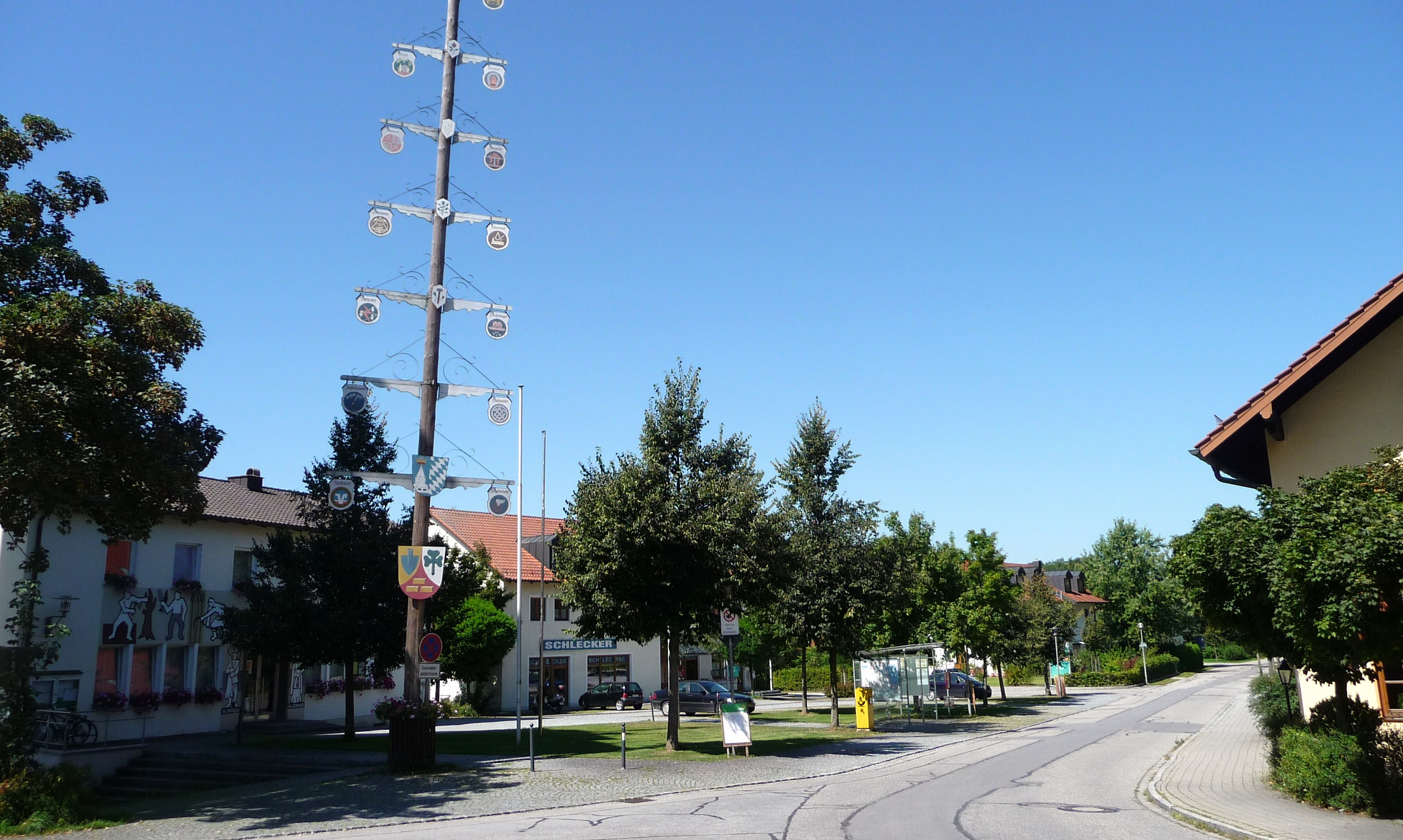
- Village center

- Coat of arms

- Location of Kastl within Altötting district
- Interactive map of Kastl
- Location within Germany Location within Bavaria
- Coordinates: 48°12′N 12°42′E
- Country: Germany
- State: Bavaria
- Admin. region: Oberbayern
- District: Altötting
- Municipal assoc.: Unterneukirchen

Government
  - Mayor (2020–26): Gottfried Mitterer (FW)

Area
  - Total: 27.36 km^{2} (10.56 sq mi)
- Elevation: 437 m (1,434 ft)

Population (2025-12-31)
  - Total: 2,813
  - Density: 102.8/km^{2} (266.3/sq mi)
- Time zone: UTC+01:00 (CET)
  - Summer (DST): UTC+02:00 (CEST)
- Postal codes: 84556
- Dialling codes: 08671
- Vehicle registration: AÖ
- Website: www.kastl-obb.de

Kastl (German pronunciation: [ˈkastl̩]) is a municipality in the district of Altötting in Bavaria in Germany. It is the result of a merger of Oberkastl, Unterkastl, and Forstkastl in the 1960s.
