= Haiming, Germany =

Haiming
- Municipality
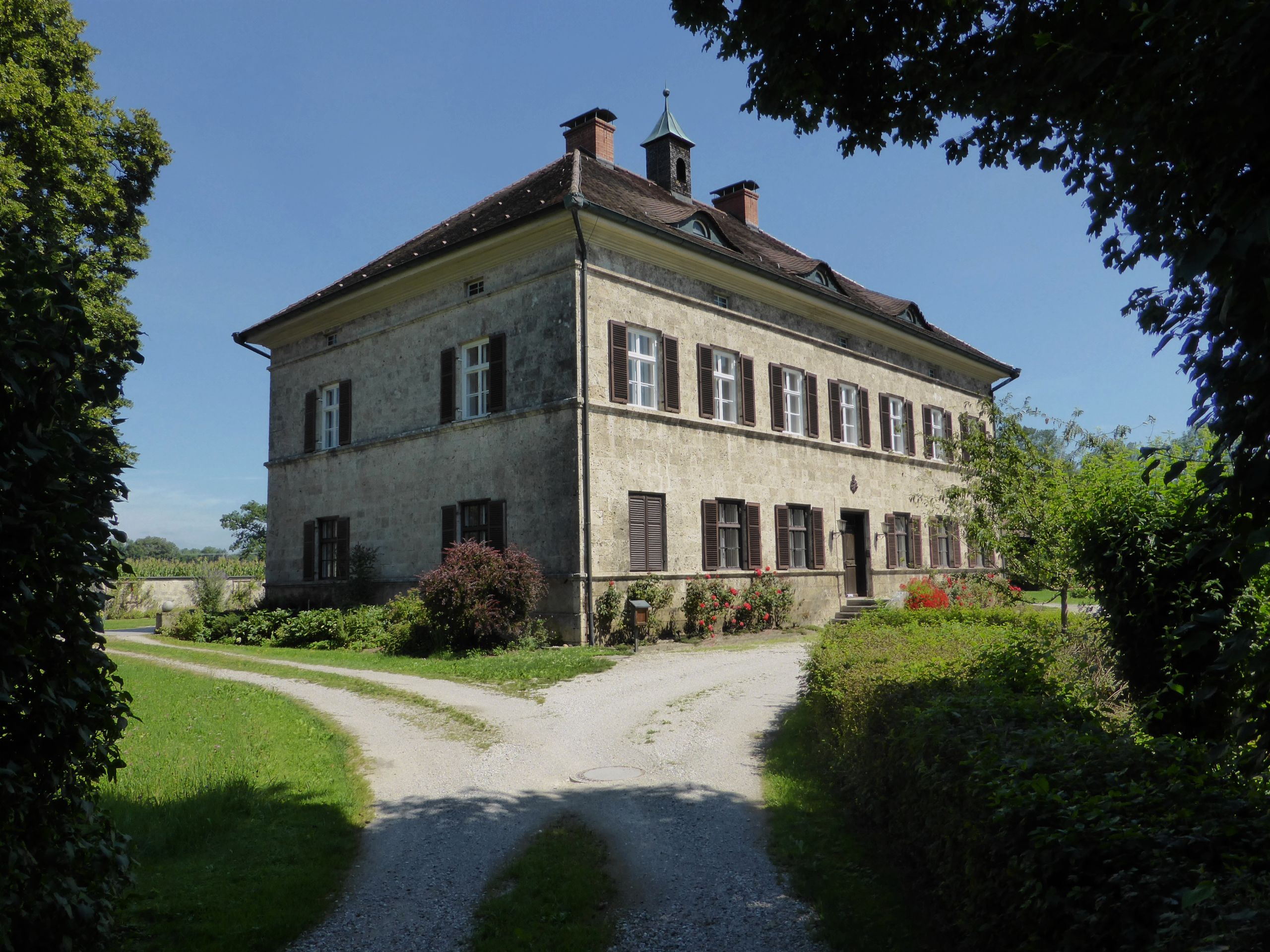
- Haiming Castle

- Coat of arms

- Location of Haiming within Altötting district
- Interactive map of Haiming
- Location within Germany Location within Bavaria
- Coordinates: 48°12′45″N 12°53′16″E
- Country: Germany
- State: Bavaria
- Admin. region: Oberbayern
- District: Altötting

Government
  - Mayor (2020–26): Wolfgang Beier (CSU)

Area
  - Total: 28.73 km^{2} (11.09 sq mi)
- Elevation: 363 m (1,191 ft)

Population (2025-12-31)
  - Total: 2,542
  - Density: 88.48/km^{2} (229.2/sq mi)
- Time zone: UTC+01:00 (CET)
  - Summer (DST): UTC+02:00 (CEST)
- Postal codes: 84533
- Dialling codes: 08678
- Vehicle registration: AÖ
- Website: www.haiming.de

Haiming (German pronunciation: [ˈhaɪmɪŋ]) is a municipality in the district of Altötting in Bavaria in Germany, located between the rivers Inn and Salzach.
