= Altötting =

- Town
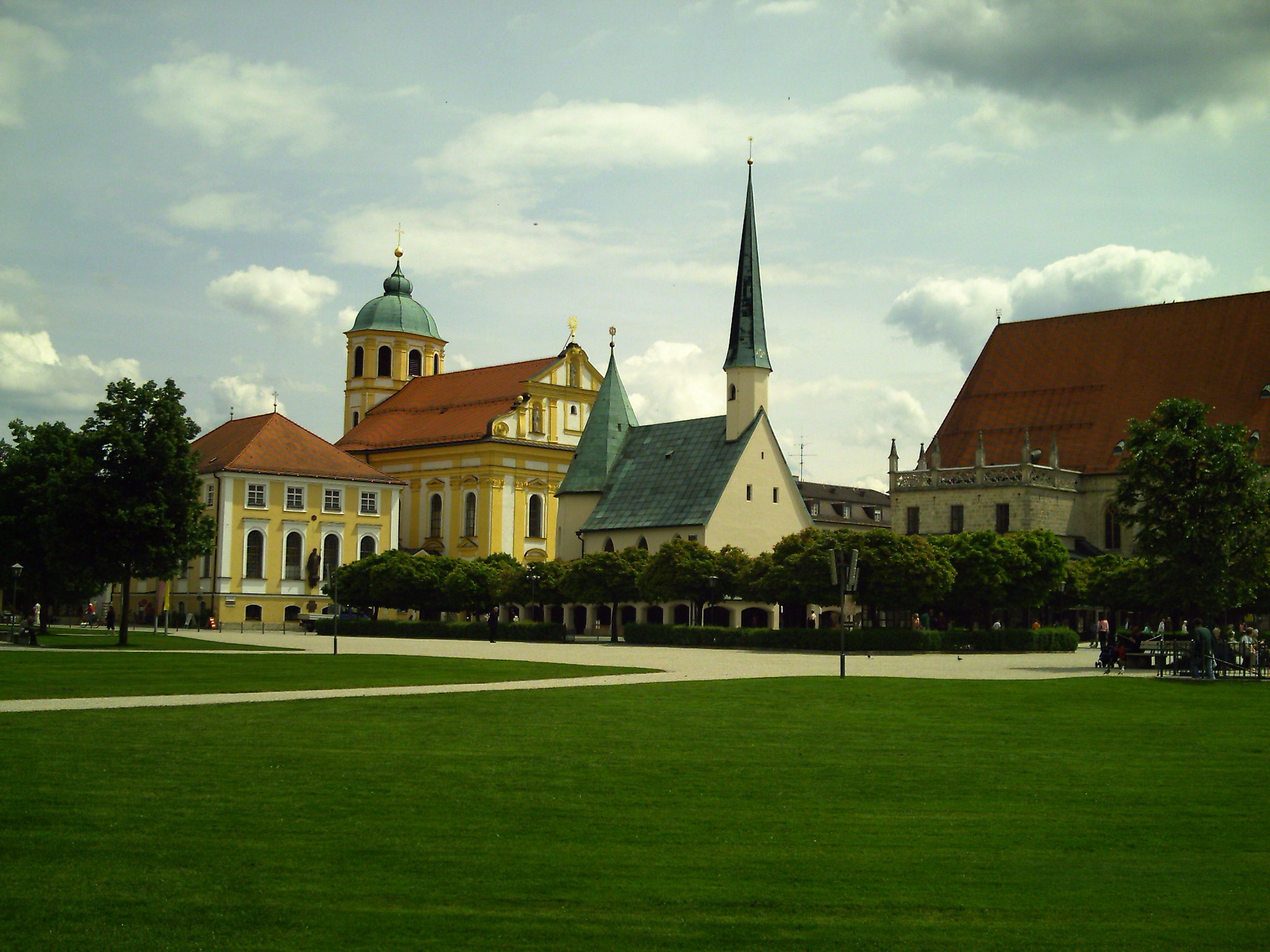
- The Shrine of Our Lady of Altötting

- Coat of arms

- Location of Altötting within Altötting district
- Interactive map of Altötting
- Location within Germany Location within Bavaria
- Coordinates: 48°13′36″N 12°40′42″E
- Country: Germany
- State: Bavaria
- Admin. region: Oberbayern
- District: Altötting
- Subdivisions: 40 official subdivisions

Government
  - Mayor (2020–26): Stephan Antwerpen (CSU)

Area
  - Total: 23.07 km^{2} (8.91 sq mi)
- Elevation: 403 m (1,322 ft)

Population (2025-12-31)
  - Total: 12,980
  - Density: 562.6/km^{2} (1,457/sq mi)
- Time zone: UTC+01:00 (CET)
  - Summer (DST): UTC+02:00 (CEST)
- Postal codes: 84503
- Dialling codes: 08671
- Vehicle registration: AÖ
- Website: www.altoetting.de

Altötting (German pronunciation: [altˈʔœtɪŋ], lit. 'Old Ötting', in contrast to "New Ötting"; Bavarian: Oideding, pronounced [ɔidˈɛːde̝ŋ]) is a town in Bavaria, capital of the district Altötting of Germany. For 500 years it has been the scene of religious pilgrimages by Catholics in honor of Mary, including a visit by Pope John Paul II in 1980 and one by Pope Benedict XVI in 2006.

== History ==
During the Carolingian period, there was a royal palace here. Nearby, King Carloman erected a Benedictine monastery in 876, with Werinolf as first abbot, and also built the abbey church in honour of the Apostle St. Philip. In 907 King Louis the Child gave the abbey in commendam to Burchard, the Bishop of Passau (903-915), (probably identical with Burchard, second and last abbot). In 910 the Hungarians ransacked and burnt the church and abbey.

In 1228 Duke Louis I, Duke of Bavaria rebuilt these buildings and, after they were sanctified, placed them in charge of twelve Canons Regular, headed by a provost. The canons remained until the secularization of the Bavarian monasteries in 1803.

Saint Conrad of Parzham, O.F.M. Cap., (1818–1894) served as porter at the Friary of St. Ann in the city of Altötting for 40 years.

== Grace Chapel ==
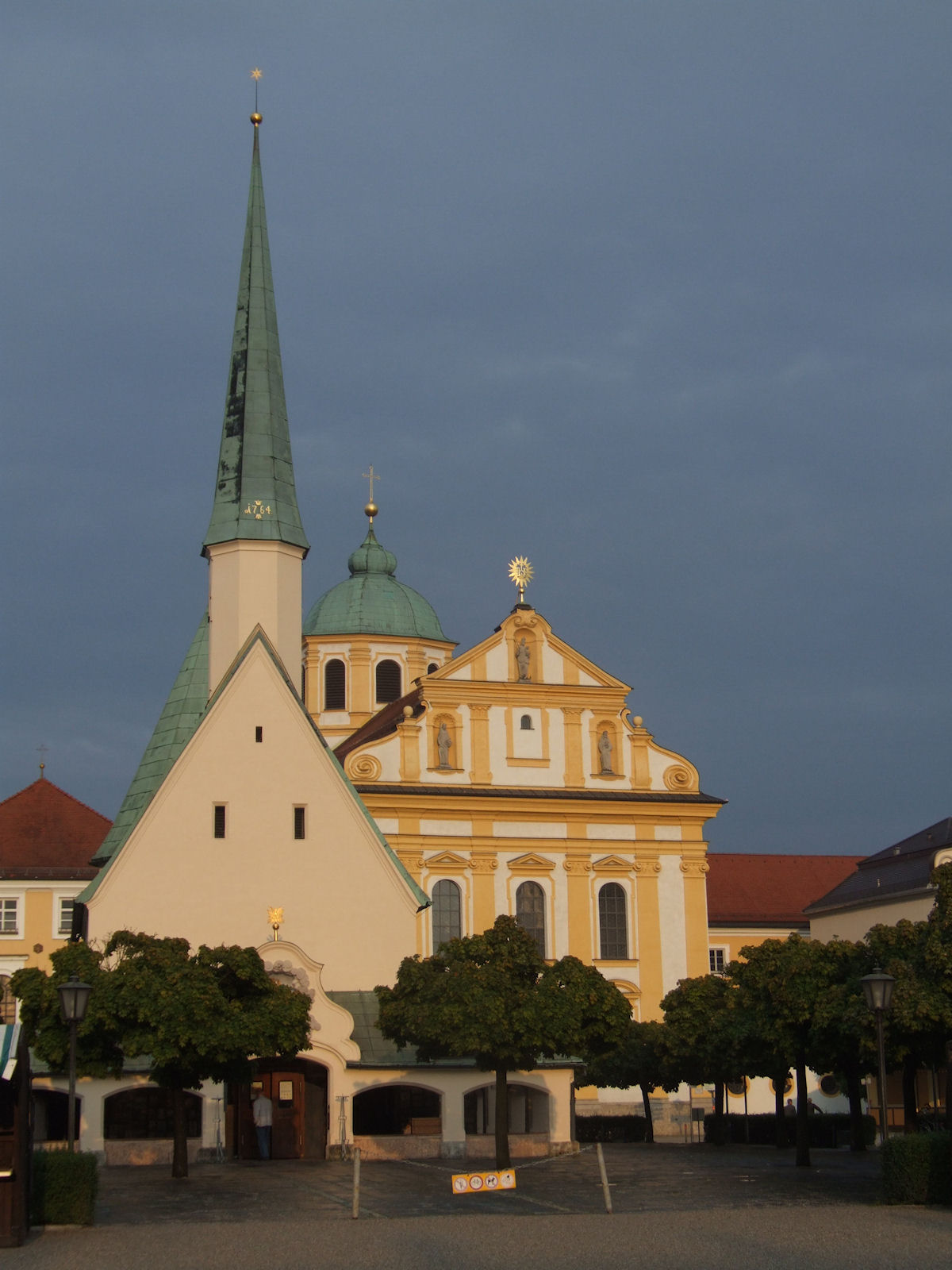
The Chapel of Grace

This small town is famous for the Gnadenkapelle (Chapel of Grace), one of the most-visited shrines in Germany. This is a tiny octagonal chapel which keeps a venerated statue of the Virgin Mary. According to the legend, in 1489, a 3-year-old local boy who had drowned in the river was revived when his grieving mother placed him in front of a wooden statue of the Virgin Mary at the high altar. News of the miracle quickly spread, and the chapel was immediately extended by the erection of a nave and a covered walkway.

In the Treasure Vault of the Holy Chapel of Altötting is the Golden Horse, or "Goldenes Rössli", a 62 cm-high altarpiece made of gold and gilded silver, with golden figures coated with different coloured enamel. It depicts the Virgin Mary with the Christ Child, and, as children, John the Baptist, John the evangelist and St. Catherine. In the foreground is King Charles VI of France. This masterpiece of the goldsmith's craft was a gift from Isabeau, Queen of France, a member of the Wittelsbach Bavarian royal family.

The tradition of Bavaria calls for the heart of the deceased king to be placed in an urn and kept at the chapel at Altötting. The heart of King Ludwig II of Bavaria, the builder of Neuschwanstein castle, lies in this chapel, along with those of his grandfathers and father.

== Sights ==
Other architectural highlights in the town are the twin-towered Stiftskirche, a late Gothic church erected in the early years of the 16th century in order to cater for the growing affluence of pilgrims, and the huge Neo-baroque Basilika, built at the beginning of the 20th century.

== Twin towns – sister cities ==
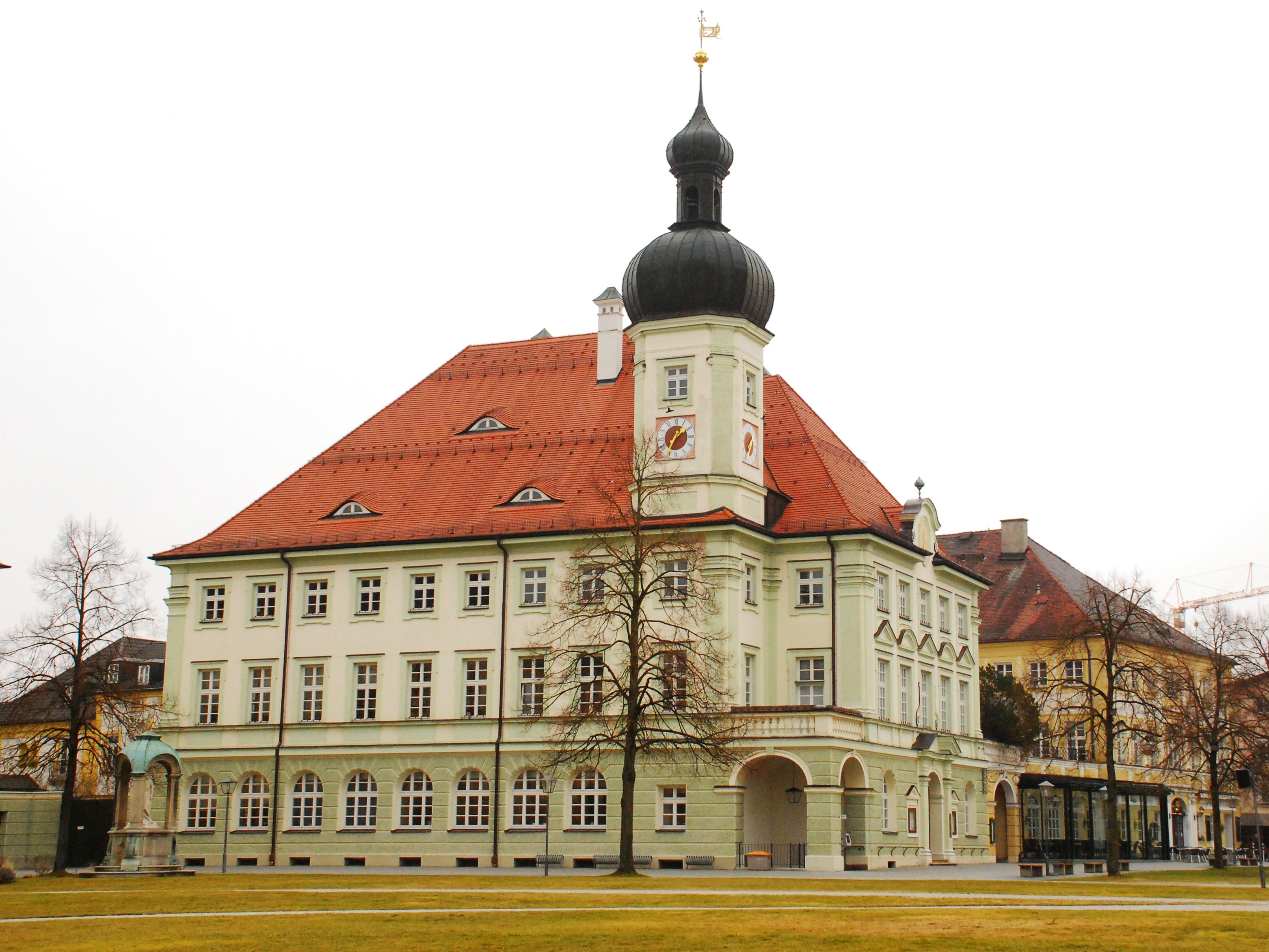
Town hall

Altötting is twinned with:

- Częstochowa, Poland
- Fátima, Portugal
- Loreto, Italy
- Lourdes, France
- Mariazell, Austria
- Százhalombatta, Hungary

== Notable people ==
Notable people associated with Altötting:

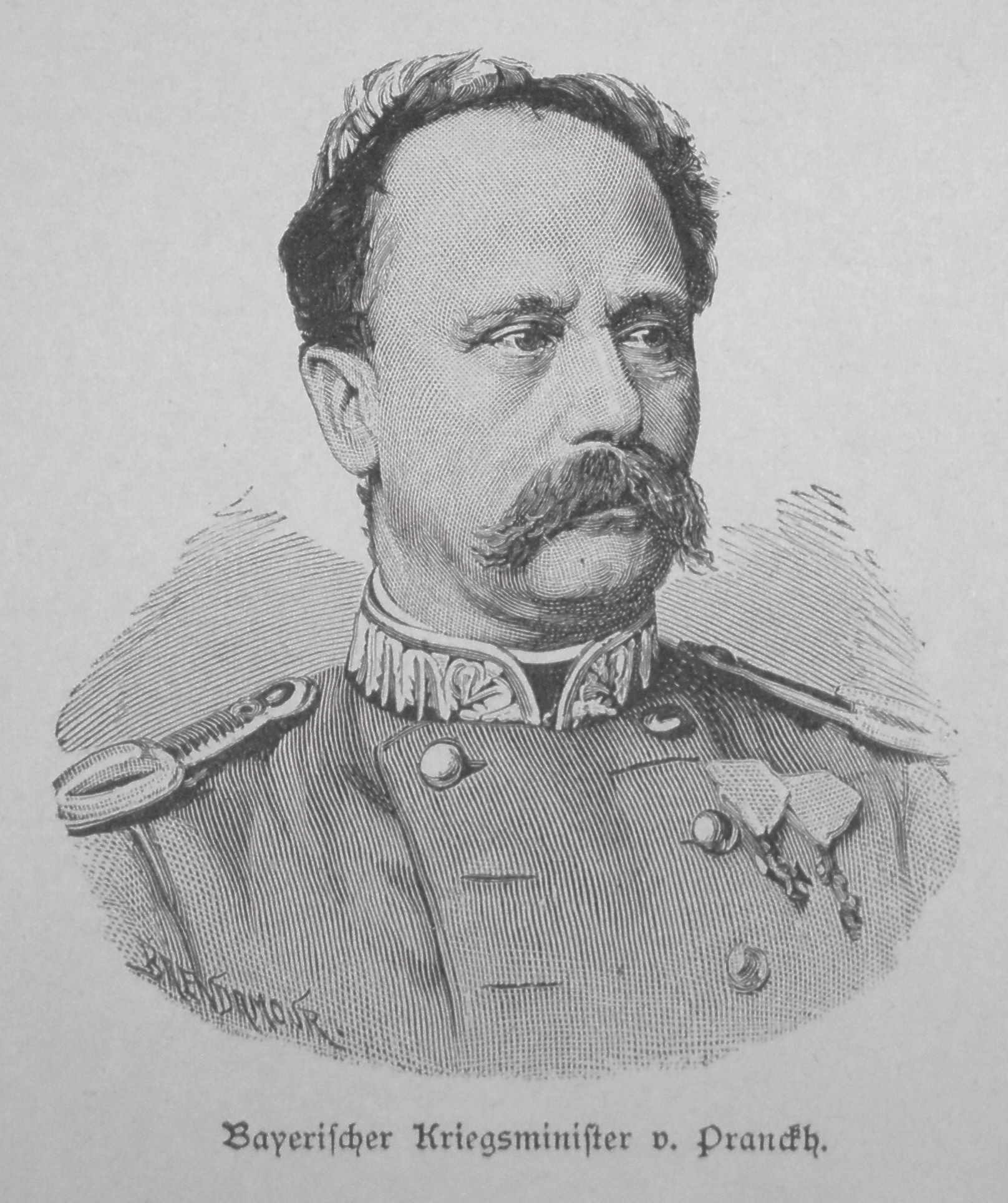
Siegmund von Pranckh (1895/1896)

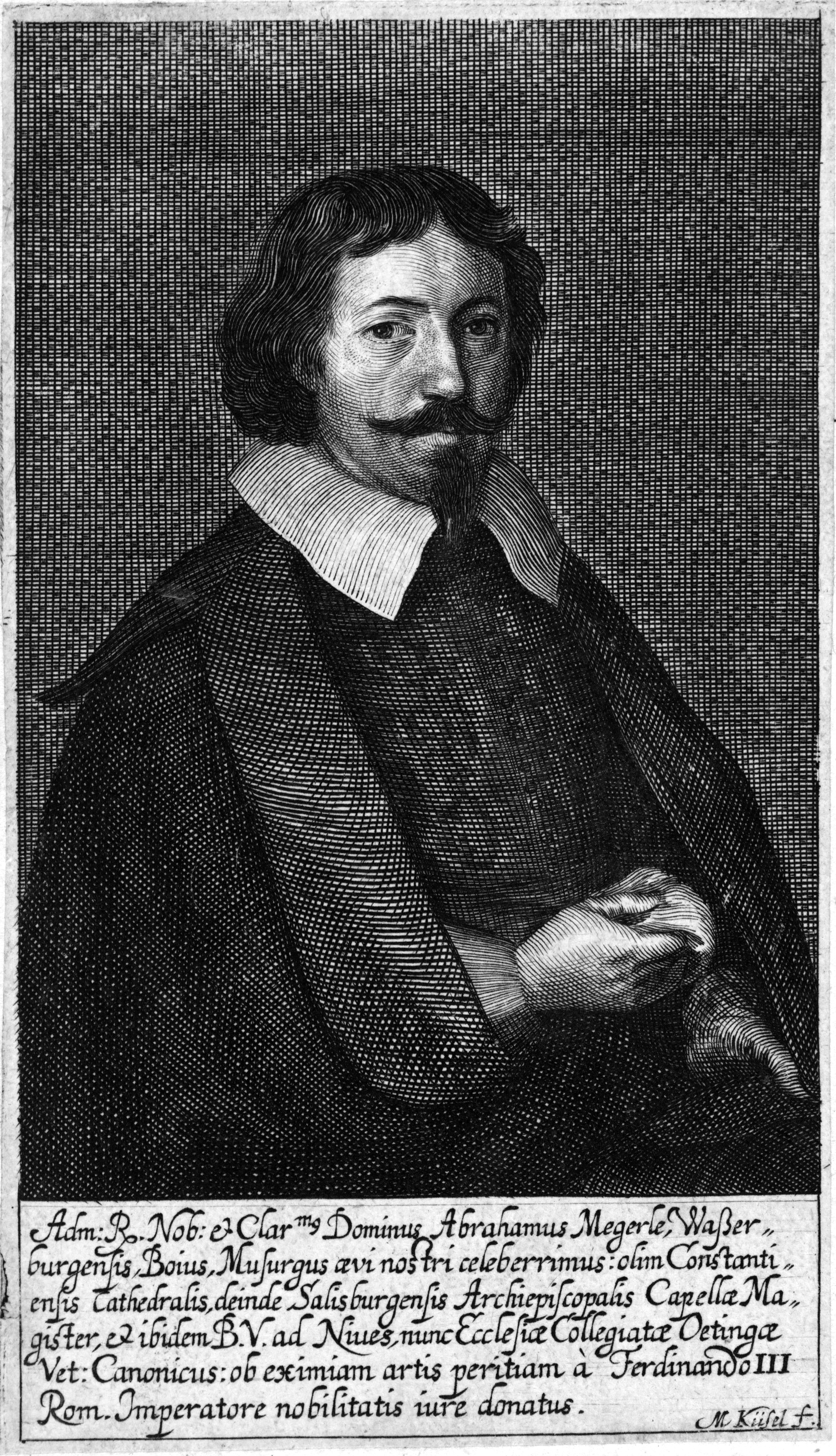
Abraham Megerle

- Louis the Child (893-911), East Frankish King
- Abraham Megerle (1607-1680), priest and composer
- Eusebio Kino (1645-1711), Jesuit missionary and explorer of Southwest U.S.A and Northwest Mexico
- Conrad of Parzham (1818-1894), a saint of the Roman Catholic Church
- Siegmund von Pranckh (1821-1888), Bavarian General and Minister of War
- Hubert Haider (1879–1971), landscape painter, lived and died at Altötting
- Weiß Ferdl (1883-1949), folk singer and actor
- Ernst Hiemer (1900-1974), German writer
- Paul Augustin Mayer (1911-2010), cardinal
- Pope Benedict XVI (1927-2022), pope
- Wilhelm Schraml (born 1935), former bishop of Passau
- Hans-Christian Schmid (born 1965), film director and screenwriter
- Andreas Hykade (born 1968), animation director
- Werner Riess (born 1970), historian
- Timo Nagy (born 1983), football player
- Christoph Ullmann (born 1983), hockey player
- Thomas Kurz (born 1988), football player
- Maximilian Thiel (born 1993), football player
- Richard Neudecker (born 1996), football player
