= Catholic Church in Germany =

- German: Katholische Kirche in Deutschland
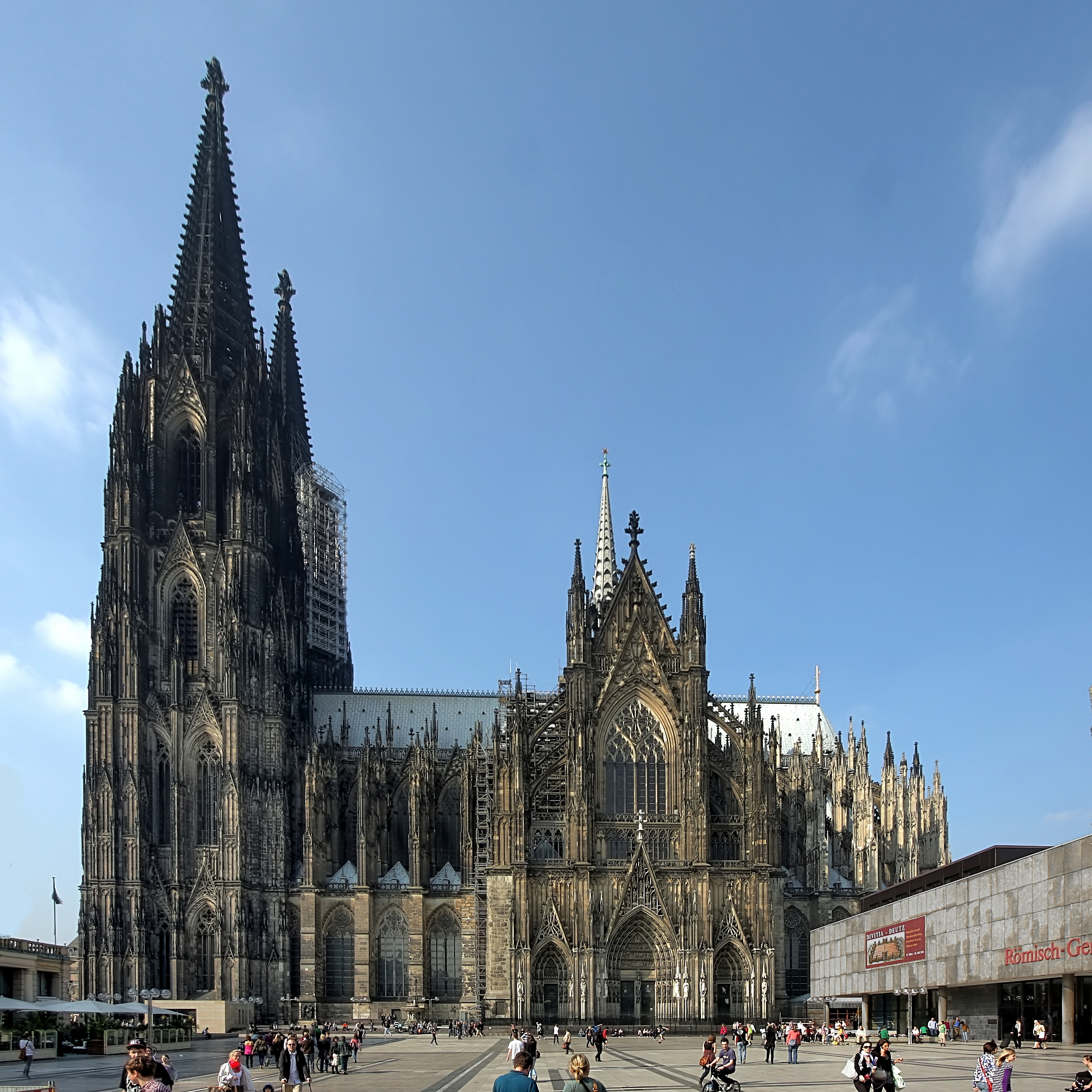
- Cologne Cathedral
- Type: National polity
- Classification: Catholic
- Orientation: Latin
- Scripture: Catholic Bible
- Theology: Catholic theology
- Polity: Episcopal
- Governance: German Bishops' Conference
- Pope: Leo XIV
- Chairman: Heiner Wilmer
- Director: Franz Lackner
- Region: Germany
- Language: German, Latin
- Headquarters: Bonn, Germany
- Members: 19.2 million (23%) (2025)
- Official website: German Bishops' Conference

The Catholic Church in Germany (German: Katholische Kirche in Deutschland) or Roman Catholic Church in Germany (German: Römisch-katholische Kirche in Deutschland) is part of the worldwide Catholic Church in communion with the Pope, assisted by the Roman Curia, and with the German bishops. The current "Speaker" (i.e., Chairman) of the episcopal conference is bishop Heiner Wilmer. It is divided into 27 dioceses, 7 of them with the rank of metropolitan sees.

Map with traditionally Catholic states in green and Lutheran states in red

Growing rejection of the Church has had its impact in Germany; nevertheless, 23% of the total population remain Roman Catholic (19.2 million people as of December 2025). Before the 1990 reunification of Germany by accession of the former German Democratic Republic (or East Germany), Roman Catholics were 42% of the population of West Germany. Religious demographic data is relatively accessible in Germany because, by law, all Christian taxpayers must declare their religious affiliation so that the church tax can be deducted by the state and passed on to the relevant church in the state where the taxpayer lives.

Apart from its demographic weight, the Catholic Church in Germany has an old religious and cultural heritage, which reaches back to both Saint Boniface, the "Apostle of Germany" and the first Archbishop of Mainz, buried in Fulda, and to Charlemagne, buried at Aachen Cathedral.

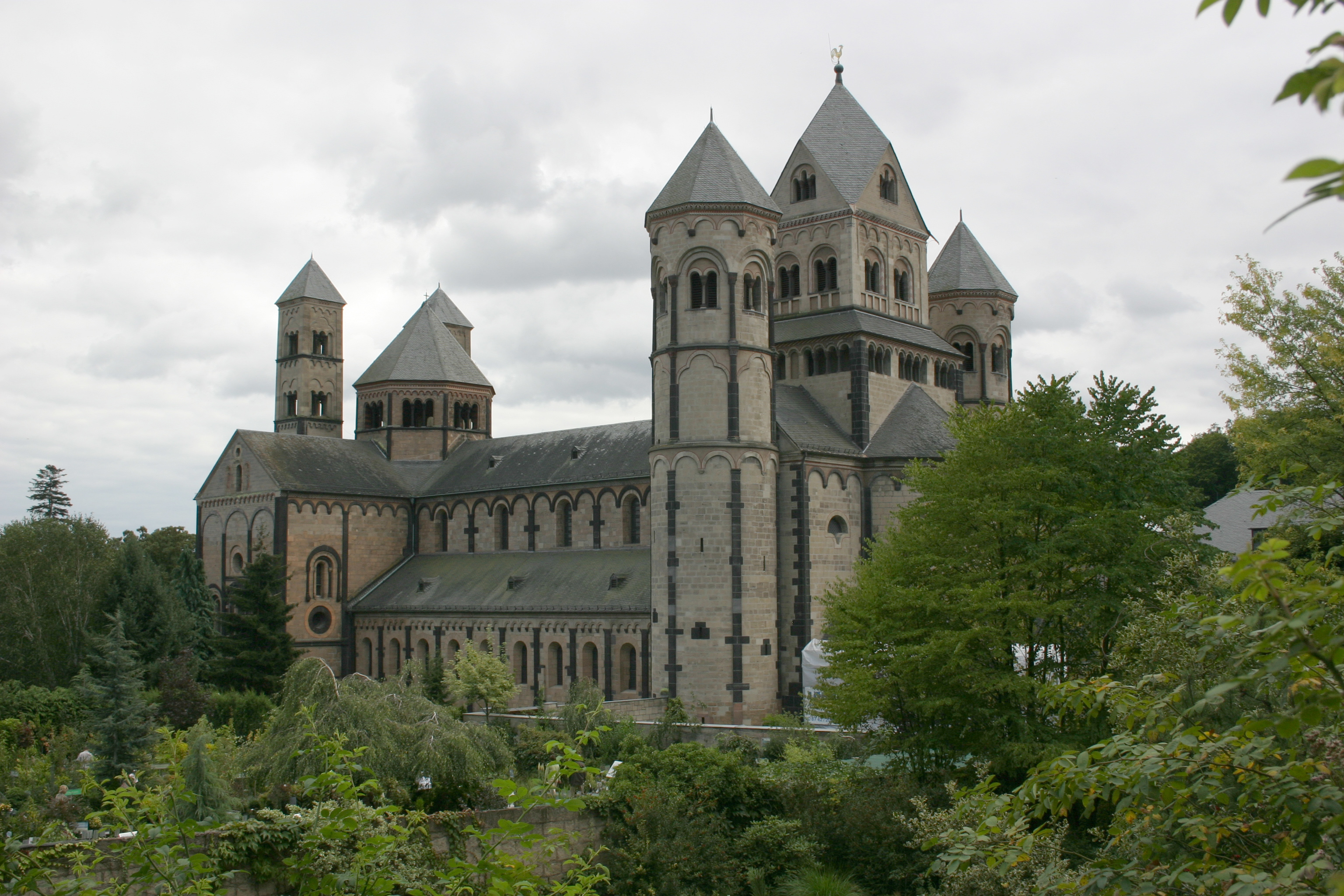
View of Maria Laach Abbey in Glees, Rhineland-Palatinate

Notable religious sites include structures from the Carolingian era to modern buildings. A cursory list may name Quedlinburg, Maria Laach, Erfurt Cathedral, Eberbach, Lorsch Abbey with its remnant 'Torhalle' (gate hall), one of the oldest structures in Germany, Reichenau, Maulbronn, Weingarten, Banz and Vierzehnheiligen on the opposite hill, the Wieskirche, Ettal, Fürstenfeld, Sacred Heart in Munich (finished in 2000), Altötting and many more. Oberammergau is famous for the Passion Play staged every ten years.

The Catholic Church in Germany also boasts one of the country's most recognizable landmarks, Cologne Cathedral. Other notable Roman Catholic cathedrals are in Aachen with the throne and tomb of Charlemagne, Augsburg, Bamberg, Berlin (St. Hedwig's Cathedral) with the crypt of Bernhard Lichtenberg, Dresden, proto-Romanesque Hildesheim, Frankfurt with the coronation church of the old Reich's Emperors (superseding Aachen), Freiburg, Freising, Fulda, Limburg which was depicted on the reverse of the old 500 Deutschmark banknote, Mainz with St. Martin's Cathedral (the only Holy see other than Rome and Jerusalem), Munich Frauenkirche with its onion domes and giant single roof, Münster, Paderborn, Passau, Regensburg, Speyer with its Rhenish Imperial cathedral, and Trier with the oldest church in the country. The country has a total of about 24,500 Church buildings including many additional religious landmarks: abbeys, minsters, basilicas, pilgrimage churches, chapels, and converted former cathedrals, built in a profusion of different layouts and styles, from Romanesque to post-modern. Many are listed as World Heritage Sites.

== History of Catholicism in Germany ==
=== Christianization of the Germans ===
The earliest stage of the conversion of the various Celtic people and Germanic people to Christianity occurred only in the western part of Germany, the part controlled by the Roman Empire. Christianization was facilitated by the prestige of the Christian Roman Empire amongst its pagan subjects and was achieved gradually by various means. The rise of Germanic Christianity was at times voluntary, particularly among groups associated with the Roman Empire. Aspects of primæval pagan religion have persisted to this day, including the names of the days of the week.

As Roman rule crumbled in Germany in the 5th century, this phase of Catholicism in Germany came to an end with it. At first, the Gallo-Roman or Germano-Roman populations were able to retain control over big cities such as Cologne and Trier, but in 459 these too were overwhelmed by the attacks of Frankish tribes. Most of the Gallo-Romans or Germano-Romans were killed or exiled. The newcomers to the towns reestablished the observance of the pagan rites. The small remaining Catholic population was powerless to protect its faith against the new ruling Frankish lords.

But as soon as 496, Frankish King Clovis I was baptized together with many members of his household. In contrast to the eastern German tribes, who became Arian Christians, he became a Catholic. Following the example of their king, many Franks were baptized too, but their Catholicism was intermixed with pagan rites.

Over the next eight centuries, Irish, Scottish, and English missionaries reintroduced Christianity into the German territories. During the period of the Frankish Empire, the two most important of these missionaries were Columbanus, who was active in the Frankish Empire from 590, and St. Boniface, who was active from 716. The missionaries, particularly the Scottish Benedictines, founded monasteries (Schottenklöster, Scottish monasteries) in Germany, which were later combined into a single congregation governed by the Abbot of the Scots monastery at Regensburg. The conversion of the Germanic peoples began with the conversion of the Germanic nobility, who were expected to impose their new faith on the general population. This expectation was consistent with the sacral position of the king in Germanic paganism: the king is charged with interacting with the divine on behalf of his people. Hence the general population saw nothing wrong with their kings choosing their preferred mode of worship. The favoured method of showing the supremacy of the Christian belief was the destruction of the holy trees of the Germans. These were trees, usually old oaks or elm trees, dedicated to the gods. Because the missionary was able to destroy the trees without being slain by the gods, his Christian god had to be stronger.

The pagan sacrifices, known as blót, had been seasonal celebrations where gifts were offered to appropriate gods and attempts were made to forecast what the coming season would be like. Similar events had sometimes been convened in times of crisis, for much the same reasons. The sacrifices, consisting of gold, weapons, animals, and even human beings, were hung on the branches of a holy tree.

The Hiberno-Scottish mission ended in the 13th century. Supported by native Christians, they succeeded in Christianizing all of Germany.

=== Catholicism as the official religion of the Holy Roman Empire ===
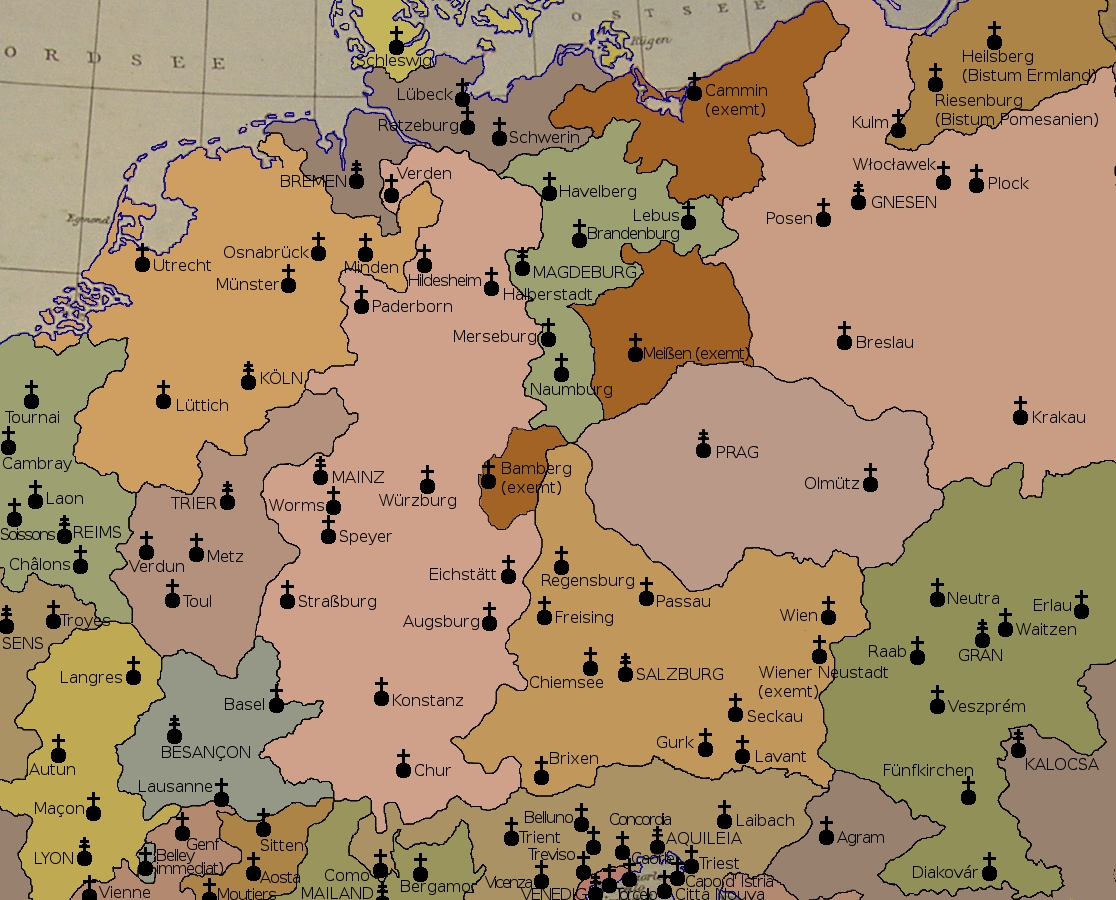
Ecclesiastical provinces and episcopal sees in Central Europe 1500

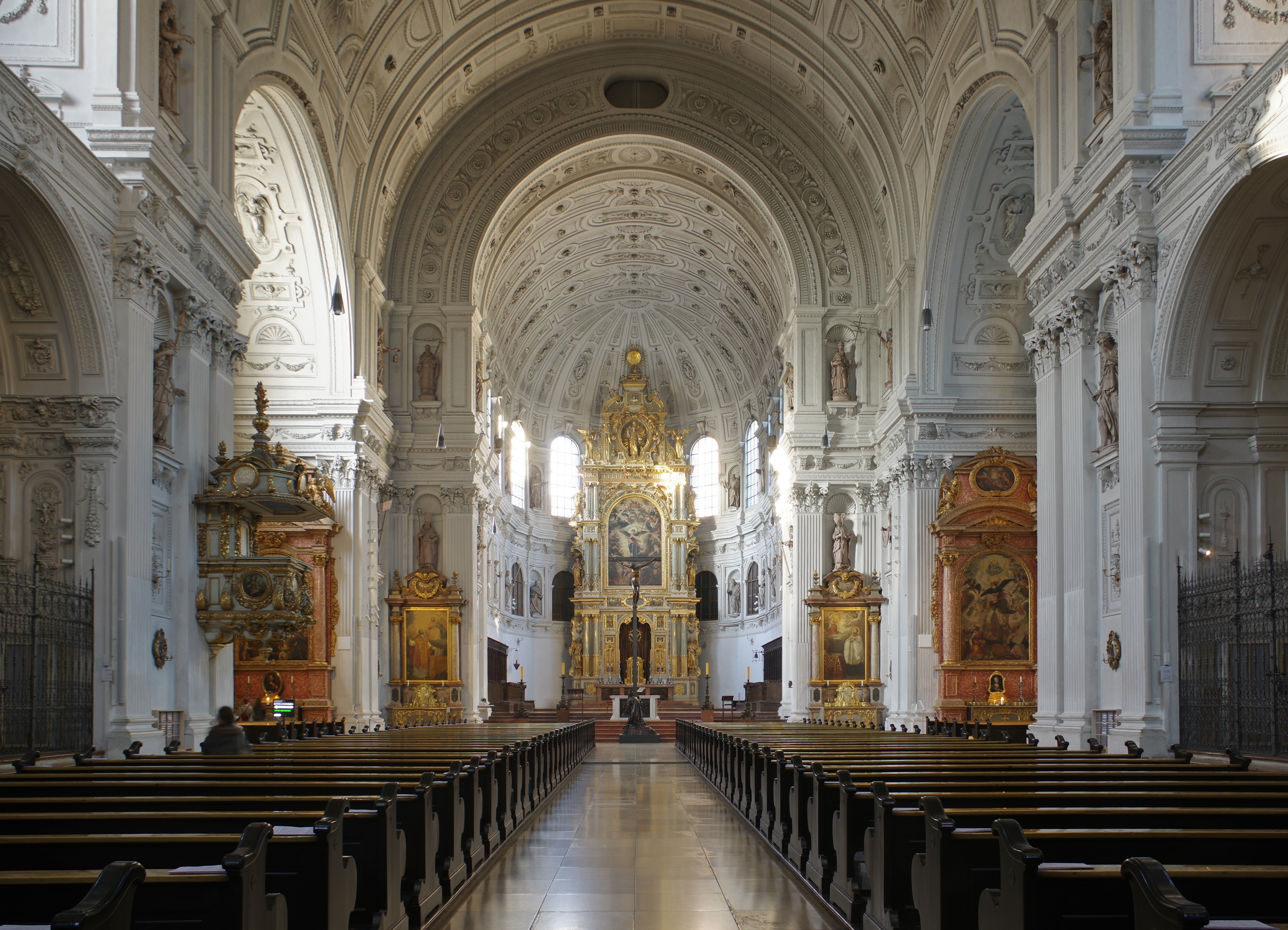
St. Michael's Church, a Roman Catholic Christian church in Munich built between 1585 and 1597

In medieval times, Catholicism was the only official religion within the Holy Roman Empire. (There were resident Jews, but they were not considered citizens of the empire.) Within the empire the Catholic Church was a major power. Large parts of the territory were ruled by ecclesiastical lords. Three of the seven seats in the council of electors of the Holy Roman Emperors were occupied by Catholic archbishops: the Arch-chancellor of Burgundy (archbishop of Trier), the Arch-chancellor of Italy (archbishop of Cologne), and the Arch-chancellor of Germany (archbishop of Mainz). The Holy Roman Emperor could only become such through coronation by the Pope.

=== The Protestant Reformation ===
Burghers and monarchs were united in their frustration at the Catholic Church not paying any taxes to secular states while itself collecting taxes from subjects and sending the revenues disproportionately to Italy. Martin Luther denounced the Pope for involvement in politics, and instigated the Protestant Reformation. Luther's doctrine of the two kingdoms justified the confiscation of church property and the crushing of the Great Peasant Revolt of 1525 by the German nobles. This explains the attraction of some territorial princes to Lutheranism. Along with confiscated Catholic church property, ecclesiastical (Catholic) dominions became the personal property of the holder of the formerly religious office, for the right to rule was attached to this office.

On 25 September 1555, Charles V, Holy Roman Emperor and the forces of the Schmalkaldic League signed the Peace of Augsburg to officially end the religious wars between the Catholics and the Protestants. This treaty legalized the partitioning of the Holy Roman Empire into Catholic and Protestant territories. Under the treaty, the religion of the ruler (either Lutheranism or Catholicism) determined the religion of his subjects. This policy is widely referred to by the Latin phrase, cuius regio, eius religio ("whose reign, his religion", or "in the prince's land, the prince's religion"). Families were given a period in which they were free to emigrate to regions where their desired religion prevailed.

The religious intolerance and tensions within the Holy Roman Empire were one of the reasons for the Thirty Years' War (1618-1648), which devastated most of Germany and killed eight million people, many of those within the Empire dying from disease and famine.

=== Secularization of church states in the aftermath of the French Revolution ===
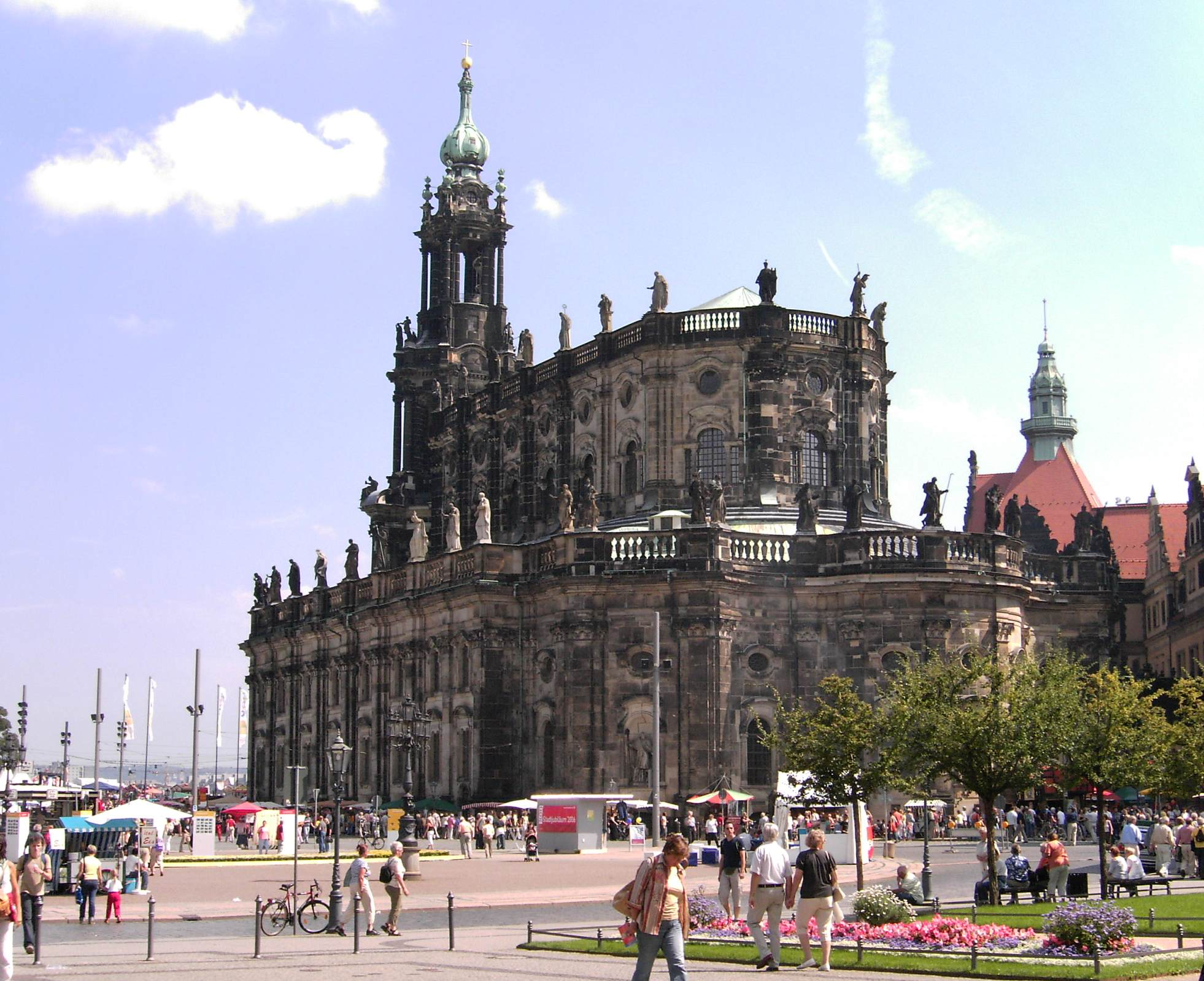
The Cathedral of the Holy Trinity in Dresden, capital of the Electorate of Saxony

In the war of the First Coalition, revolutionary France defeated the coalition of Prussia, Austria, Spain, and Britain. One result was the cession of the Rhineland to France by the Treaty of Basel in 1795. Six years later, the Concordat of 1801, an agreement between Napoleon and Pope Pius VII, was signed on 15 July 1801. Another two years later, in 1803, to compensate the princes of the annexed territories, a set of mediatizations was carried out, which brought about a major redistribution of territorial sovereignty within the Empire. At that time, large parts of Germany were still ruled by Catholic bishops (95.000 km^{2} with more than three million inhabitants). In the mediatizations, the ecclesiastical states were by and large annexed to neighbouring secular principalities. Only three survived a tide of secularization as theocracies: the Archbishopric of Regensburg, which was raised from a bishopric with the incorporation of the Archbishopric of Mainz, and the lands of the Teutonic Knights and Knights of Saint John.

Monasteries and abbeys lost their means of existence as they had to abandon their lands. Paradoxically, the losses in church land and property made the national or local churches in Germany (as well as in the former Holy Roman Empire, France, Switzerland, and Austria) more dependent on Rome (ultramontane). This shift in the 1850s was sustained by a more zealous clergy, the revival of old teaching orders, the emergence of Marian confraternities, new religious congregations of men and women, and the holding of popular missions.

=== Kulturkampf ===
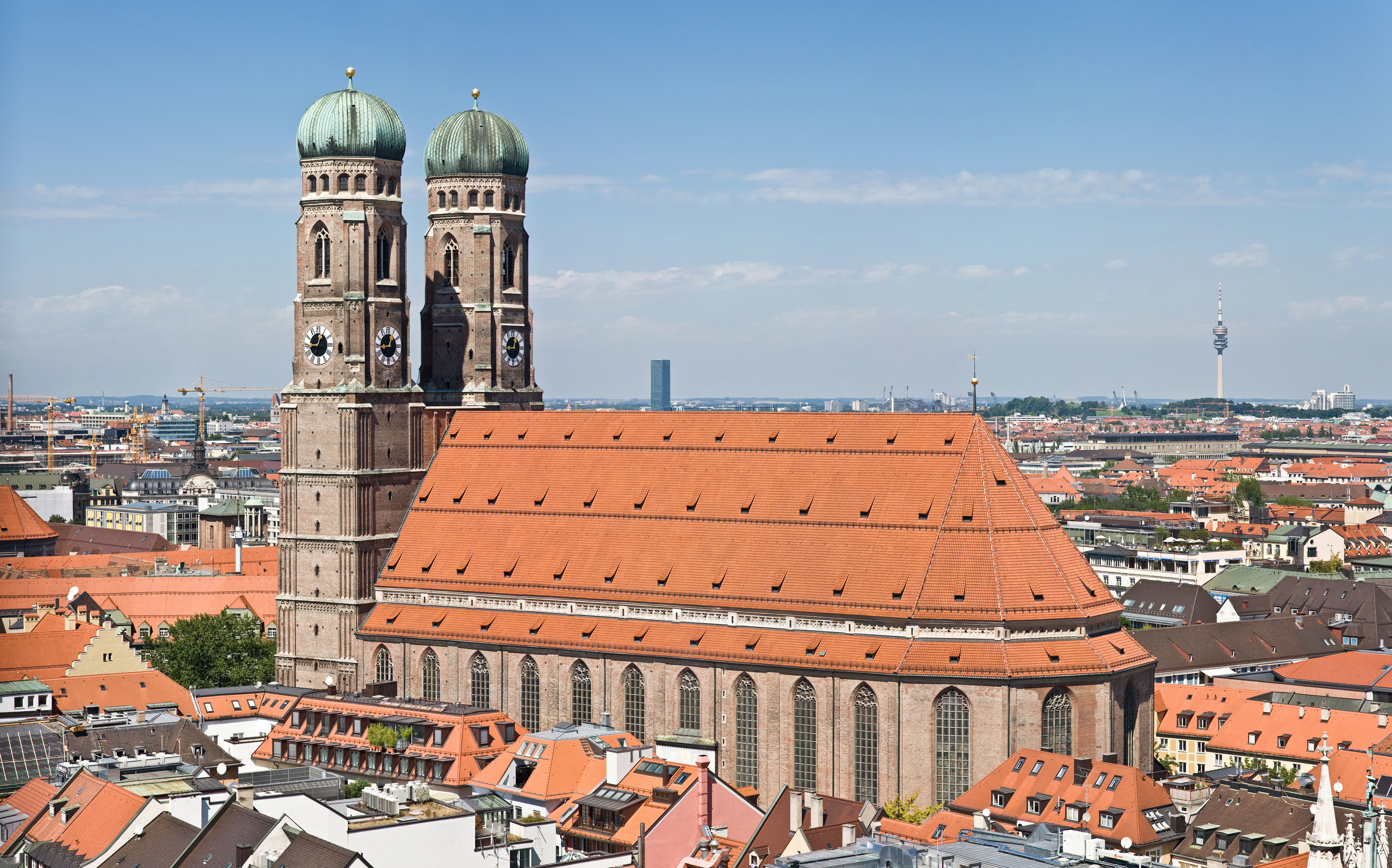
Munich Frauenkirche. Cathedral of the Archbishop of Munich and Freising

In the mid-19th century, the Catholic Church was also seen as a political power, even in Protestant Prussia, exerting a strong influence on many parts of life. However, from the Catholics' point of view (especially where Catholics were the majority as in the Rhineland Province, the Saar, Alsace and Loraine, and Silesia), Catholics often felt intimidated by self-consciously Protestant rulers, especially when an anti-Catholic campaign was carried on at many levels and would involve "the banishing of priests and nuns from the country, the driving of bishops from their chairs, the closing of schools, the confiscation of church property, the disruption of church gatherings, the disbanding of Catholic associations, and an open feud with the Vatican.

Chancellor Bismarck regarded the Church as a threat, especially in view of its defense of the discriminated Polish minority.

Laws enacted in the state of Prussia and in the empire in the early 1870s discriminated against Catholics. These laws were resisted by the Church, leading to heated public debates in the media and in the parliaments, during which the term "Kulturkampf" gained widespread currency. Diplomatic ties with the Vatican were cut and additional laws were passed to quell Catholic opposition. This only resulted in more support by the Catholic population and more resistance by the Church. During the Kulturkampf, four bishops and 185 priests in defiance of the laws were tried and imprisoned and many more were fined or went into exile.

After the death of Pope Pius IX in 1878, Bismarck took up negotiations with more conciliatory Pope Leo XIII who proclaimed the end of the Kulturkampf on 23 May 1887.

=== Catholicism and Third Reich ===
Religion in the 1925 census. The blue areas are Protestant. The mustard colored areas are Catholic.

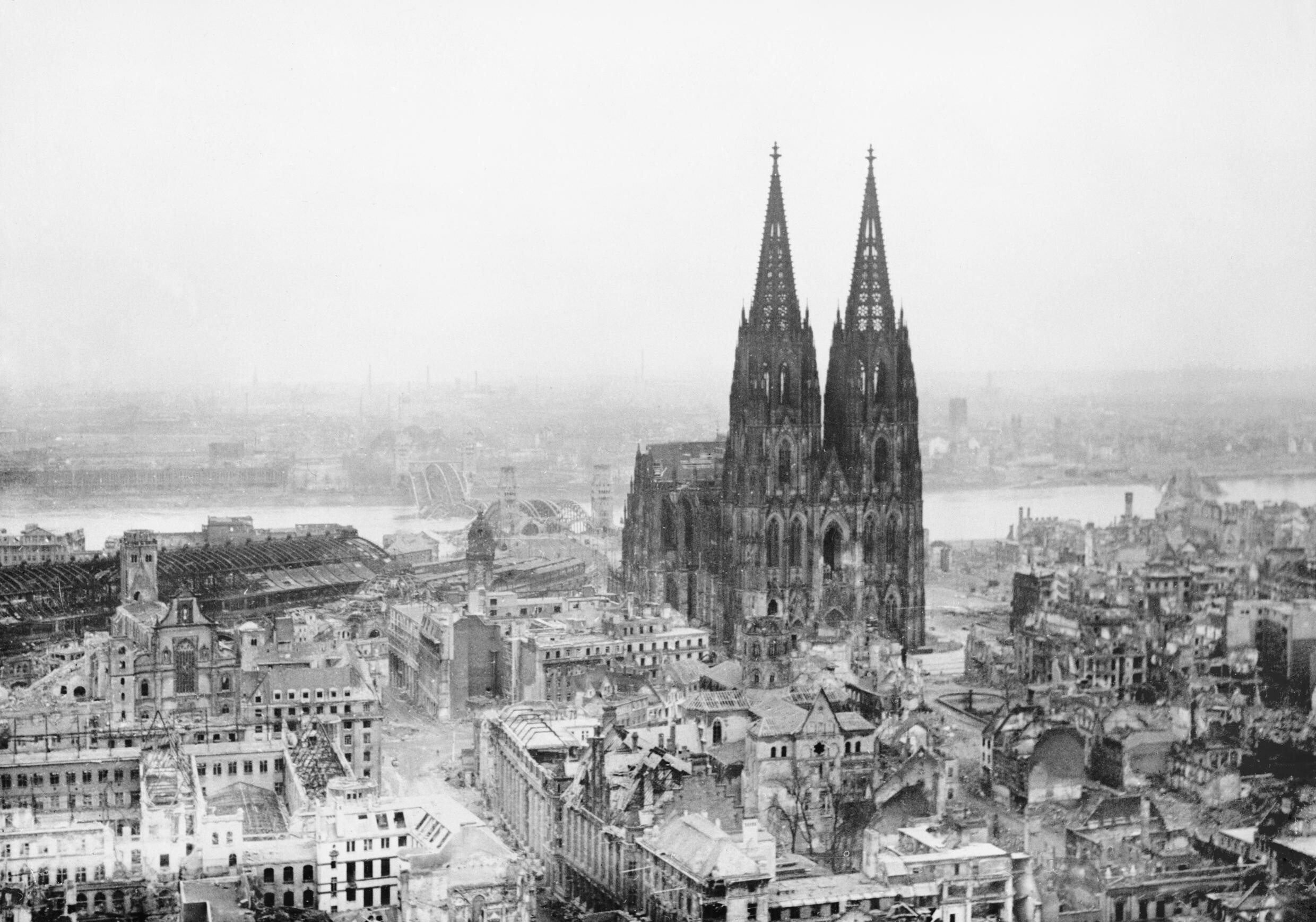
Cologne Cathedral stands intact amidst the destruction caused by Allied air raids, 9 March 1945

The Catholic Church denounced Nazism in the years leading up to its rise to power in 1933–34. It believed its primary duty was to protect German Catholics and the Church. Popes Pius XI and Pius XII publicly denounced racism and the murder of innocents. Many Jews were offered baptismal certificates by local parishes and priests in Germany, and some actually converted to escape deportation, arrest or execution, though the Nazi policy of anti-semitism did not exempt "converts" as their philosophy was based on race as pointed out in its National Socialist Program – not on religion. The Vatican knew of the murder of the Jews very early on during the Third Reich, as it had religious representatives in all of the occupied countries.

Many individual priests, religious and lay Catholics attempted to save Jews in Germany. Adolf Hitler was raised as a Catholic in Austria but no longer practised his faith as an adult and as he rose to power. The Catholic Church was in opposition to other ideologies like Communism, because these ideologies were deemed incompatible with Christian morals. Some German bishops expected their priests to promote the Catholic political Centre Party. The majority of Catholic-sponsored newspapers supported the Centre Party over the Nazi Party. In Munich there were some Catholics, both lay and clerics, who supported Hitler, and, on occasion and contrary to Catholic doctrine, in the early 1920s, attacked a leading bishop for his defense of Jews.

Some bishops prohibited Catholics in their dioceses from joining the Nazi Party. This ban was modified after Hitler's 23 March 1933 speech to the Reichstag in which he described Christianity as the foundation for German values. The Nazis did not formally advocate Catholicism but rather an apostate "Christian" sect known as Positive Christianity that was in direct opposition to Catholic dogma and doctrine.

=== Catholicism in the German Democratic Republic ===
After World War II the Catholics in the zone occupied by the Soviet army found themselves under a militantly atheist government. Many parishes were cut off from their dioceses in the western part of Germany. German Catholicism was comparatively less affected than Protestantism by the establishment of the GDR, as nearly all of the Soviet zone's territory was historically majority Protestant, and only 11% of the people were Catholic. There were only two, small, majority-Catholic regions in the GDR: a part of the Eichsfeld region and the region in the southeast inhabited by Sorbs.

== Catholicism today in Germany ==
Members of the Catholic Church in Germany in December 2012 (ecclesiastical provinces)

23% of the total population is Catholic (19.2 million people as of December 2025). There is not a single state in Germany's Bundesländer (federal states), where Catholics has absolute majority: however Catholicism is the largest religious group in Saarland, Bavaria, Rhineland-Palatinate, North Rhine-Westphalia and Baden-Württemberg.

The German state supports both the Catholic and Protestant churches; it collects taxes for the churches and there is religious education in the schools, taught by teachers who have to be approved by the churches. Church taxes are "automatic paycheck deductions" taken from all registered church members, "regardless of" whether, and if yes, "how often members attend services."

Catholicism in Germany today faces several challenges:

- Traditionally, there were localities with Catholic majorities and cities of Protestant majorities; however, the mobility of modern society began to mix the population. Interconfessional married couples face the problem of not being able to share the same communion. Because of continuing secularization, most states have neither a Catholic nor a Protestant absolute majority (In addition to the ones with Catholic majorities mentioned above, there is not single Protestant absolute majority in Germany.).
- Modern society is changing old structures. Exclusively Catholic environments are disintegrating, even in traditional areas like the state of Bavaria where the Catholic majority was lost in the archdiocese of Munich (including the city of Munich and large parts of Upper Bavaria) as recently as in 2010.
- The number of Catholics who attend Sunday Mass has decreased (from 22% in 1990 to 13% in 2009).

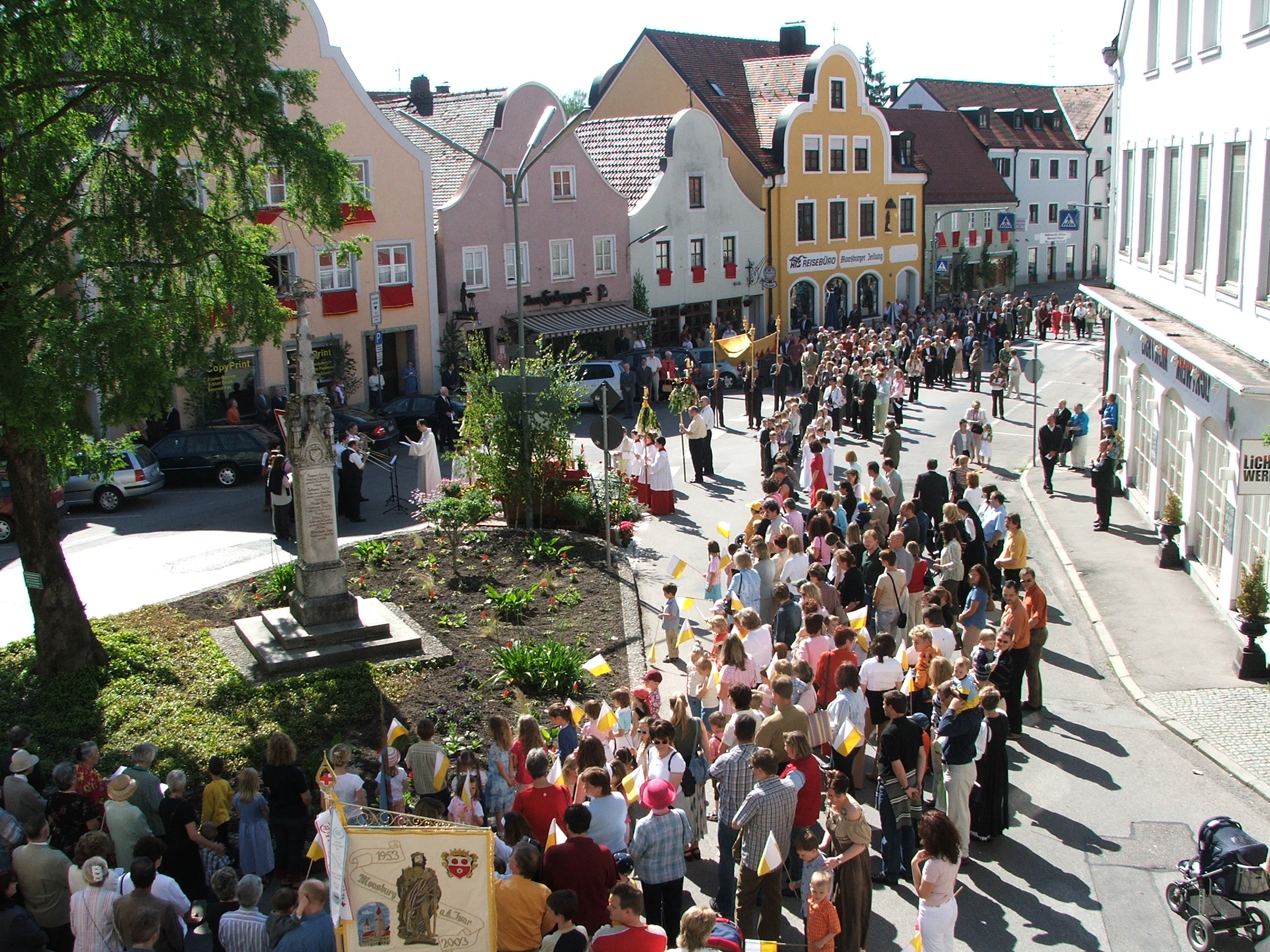
Catholic procession in Moosburg, Bavaria, 2005

One of the biggest challenges facing the church is to retain the registered, tax-paying members (regardless of how often they attend services) to fund parishes and church agencies, especially its international relief organizations like Adveniat. German Catholics, however, are divided over the issue of a compulsory church tax. Under the tax an additional 8 percent to 9 percent of personal income tax is deducted at source by the German state from registered churchgoers (of Catholic and Protestant communities). Although the tax provides the Catholic and Lutheran churches with an exact membership count and a net income of 5.6 billion euros (in 2008) which has helped make the German Catholic Church one of the wealthiest in the world.

A poll from universities in Berlin and Münster, advises that 70% of German Catholics approve of blessings for same-sex couples, 80% accept unmarried couples living together and 85% believe priests should be allowed to marry. 70% of German Catholics support same-sex marriage and 29% oppose it. 93% of German Catholics believe society should accept homosexuality while 6% believe society should not accept homosexuality.

According to a survey by the Erfurt-based opinion research institute INSA a third of German Catholics are considering leaving. Older Catholics consider leaving primarily due to child abuse cases while younger Catholics primarily want to avoid paying the church tax.

In 2022, 522,821 people left the Church, according to figures released by the German bishops.

The number of ordinations to the priesthood declined from 1962 (557 ordinations) to 1980. In the 1980s, more ordinations took place, likely as a result of the children of the baby boomers entering adulthood. After 1992 (269 ordinations) the downward trend resumed, falling to 25 ordinations in 2025.

=== "Tebartz effect" ===
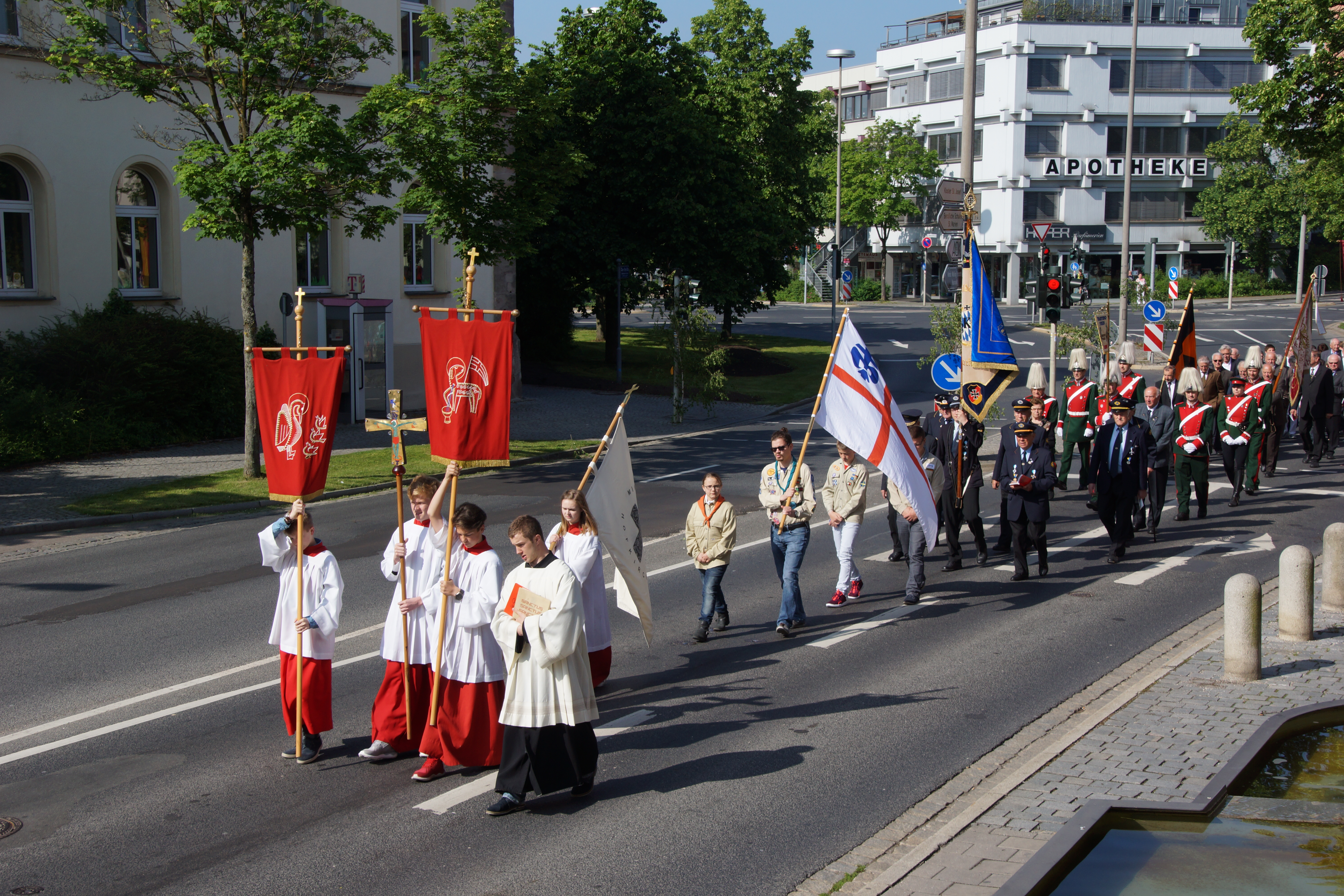
Corpus Christi procession in Neumarkt in der Oberpfalz, Bavaria, 2016

A spate of nationwide de-registrations and protest occurred in late 2013 caused by financial corruption scandals, termed the 'Tebartz-effect'. Investigations alleged misappropriation of church funds by Bishop Franz-Peter Tebartz-van Elst of Limburg over several years. Nicknamed the "Protzbischof" ("bling-bishop" or "splurge-bishop"), he provoked outrage for the hypocrisy of preaching poverty while living extravagantly.

His excesses included travelling first class on humanitarian missions to India on flights costing €7,000 each. Tebartz and his Vice-Vicar Franz Kaspar both qualified for Lufthansa's luxury frequent flyer program. Tebartz commissioned a bishop's residence, the St. Nicholas Diocese Center, costing €31 million. Details of the project were kept secret from Limburg's construction authorities to quash rumours of saunas, wine cellars, and interior decorations with precious gems, but the building was later nicknamed the "Kaaba of Limburg", as the colour and cubical shape resembled the Kaaba of Mecca. This was despite the diocese's strained budget, which often lacked funds for basic overhead and maintenance of church facilities and for services such as daycare.

The "Tebartz effect" has disillusioned both Protestant and Catholic Christians. In Cologne the Protestant Church encountered an 80% increase in absences, with 228 de-registrations. Also, 1,250 Bavarians left the church in October 2013, doubling from 602 in September. Throughout Germany the cities of Bremen, Osnabrück, Paderborn, Passau and Regensburg reported three-fold increases of Catholic resignations.

=== Synodal Path and criticism of the German Church ===
Starting on 1 December 2019, the German Catholic Church held a Synodal Path convocation discussing:

- "Power and separation of powers in the Church - joint participation and involvement in the mission"
- "Life in succeeding relationships - living love in sexuality and partnership"
- "Priestly existence today"
- "Women in ministries and offices in the Church"

The synodal path faced a number of criticisms from Catholic bishops from around the world. In February 2022, the Polish episcopate aired their concerns to Pope Francis, mentioning the impression that "the Gospel is not always the basis for reflection." In March 2022, the Scandinavian bishops also aired their deep concern of a possible "capitulation to the Zeitgeist," on the part of the German bishops. In April 2022, an international group of more than 70 bishops criticized the Germans for allegedly viewing these issues through "the lens of the world rather than through the lens of the truths revealed in Scripture and the Church's authoritative Tradition."

On November 24, 2022, the Vatican published the critique of two curial cardinals. Cardinal Marc Ouellet, prefect of the Dicastery for Bishops, after praising the seriousness of the Germans in tackling sexual abuse, said that this has been "exploited" to push unrelated ideas, and they seem to be making "concessions" to cultural and media pressure. "The agenda of a limited group of theologians" has become the bishops' proposals, which he says "openly contradict the teaching affirmed by all the popes since the Second Vatican Ecumenical Council."

Luis Ladaria Cardinal Ferrer, prefect of the Dicastery for the Doctrine of the Faith, warned of "reducing the mystery of the Church to a mere institution of power," and so "the greatest danger" of the proposals is to lose "one of the most important achievements" of Vatican II: "the clear teaching of the mission of the bishops and thus of the local Church."

On April 4, 2025, the Roman-Catholic bishop conference in Germany published after Fiducia supplicans by pope Francis a document, in which blessing ceremonies for same-sex unions are allowed. In the document are helping hints as to which church songs or which biblicals texts can be used.

== Catholic organizations in Germany ==
- Katholische junge Gemeinde (KjG)
- Bund der Deutschen Katholischen Jugend (BDKJ)

== German popes ==
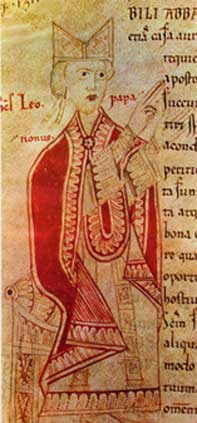
Pope Leo IX was one of seven German popes.

Seven popes have been from Germany. Bruno of Carinthia, who reigned as Pope Gregory V (996–999), is considered the first German pope. The 11th century saw five German popes, including Leo IX who was canonized as a saint. The most recent German pope was Benedict XVI, previously Joseph Cardinal Ratzinger, reigned from 2005 until his retirement in 2013.

== See also ==
- Apostolic Nuncio to Germany
- Holy See - Germany relations
- Holy See in Germany
- Religion in Germany - with colored map of the predominant denominations across the country
- Protestantism in Germany
- Eastern Orthodox Church in Germany
