= St. Mary's Catholic Church (Indianapolis, Indiana) =

Historic church in Indiana, United States

- U.S. National Register of Historic Places
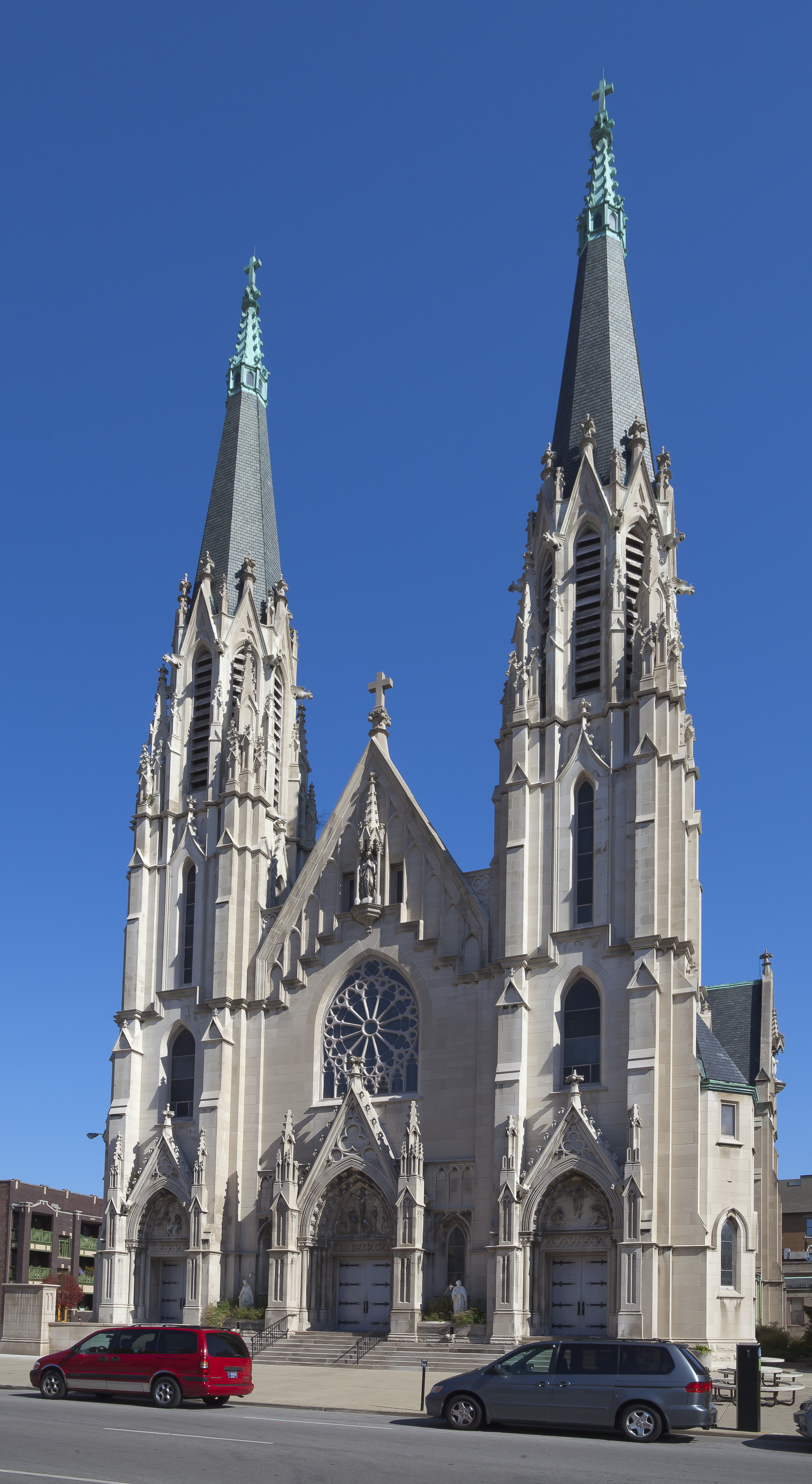
- Front of the church

- Location within Indianapolis Location within Indiana Location within the United States
- Location: 317 N. New Jersey St., Indianapolis, Indiana
- Coordinates: 39°46′20″N 86°9′0″W
- Area: Less than 1 acre (0.40 ha)
- Built: 1910
- Architect: Hermann Gaul
- Architectural style: Gothic Revival
- NRHP reference No.: 77000020
- Added to NRHP: November 9, 1977

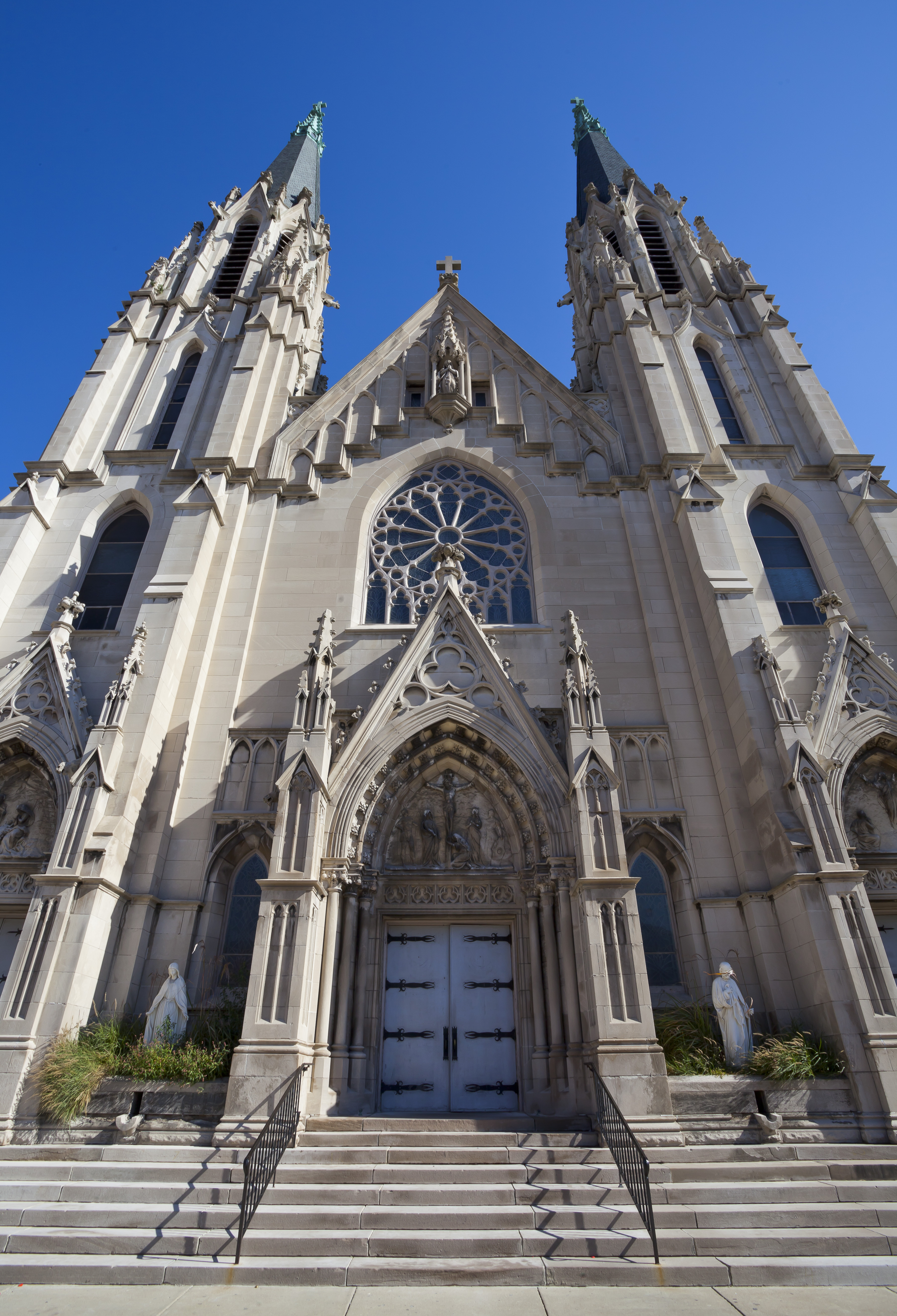
Facade

St. Mary Catholic Church (St. Marienkirche) is a parish of the Roman Catholic Church in Indianapolis, Indiana, in the Archdiocese of Indianapolis.

Originally founded in 1858 to serve the city's growing German population, it is noted for its historic parish church at the corner of New Jersey and Vermont streets, which was completed in 1912. Designed by architect Hermann J. Gaul in the late Gothic Revival style, it follows a cruciform plan modeled after the Cologne Cathedral in Germany. The church is listed on the National Register of Historic Places.

== History ==
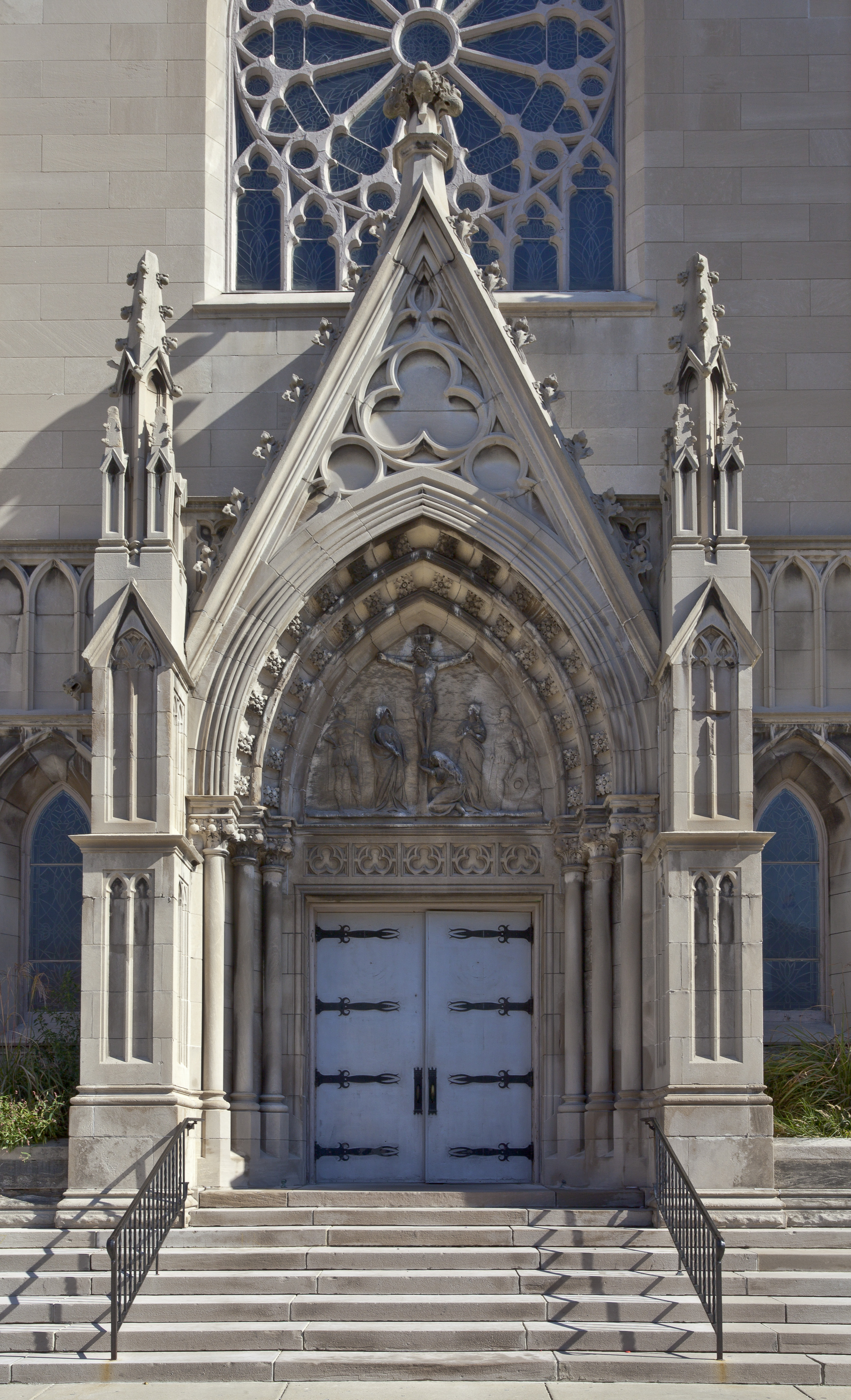
Portal

In 1856 Reverend Peter Leonard Brandt arrived from Vincennes, Indiana, to establish a German-speaking parish among the German Catholics of Indianapolis. The parish's first permanent pastor was Reverend Simon Siegrist. St. Mary's parish built their first church at 117 East Maryland Street in 1858. Parish priests conducted services in Latin and German, and the church retained Old World traditions. In addition to the area's German-speaking population, St. Mary's served the neighborhood's Italian immigrants until the Diocese of Indianapolis established Holy Rosary Catholic Church, an Italian national parish, in Indianapolis in 1911.

After the turn of the century, when the neighborhood become commercial, the parish purchased property at New Jersey and Vermont streets, where they built the present church, which was under construction from 1910 to 1912. St. Mary's has adapted to its changing ethnic neighborhood over the years. In 1967, as the city's Spanish-speaking community began to grow, the parish began offering Sunday mass in Spanish. German-language services have since been discontinued.

== Architecture ==
Architect Hermann J. Gaul, a native of Cologne, and an admirer of the Cologne Cathedral, designed the church in the late Gothic Revival style. St. Mary's follows a cruciform plan with a narthex and semi-octagonal apse. Its walls are dressed in stone.

=== Exterior ===
The church's façade is divided into three sections. The gabled two-story center section is flanked with symmetrical towers. The upper portion of the central gable contains a trefoil motif and finial. It also includes a statue of the Virgin Mary in a bracketed niche. The central portal is set between buttresses and the façade's central tympanum is filled with a relief sculpture of the Crucifixion. A frieze of blind arches flanks the doorway. Broad steps lead to the narthex. Gargoyles decorate the façade of the church at the entry portal and towers. The first three stories of the two four-story towers are square; the fourth story is octagonal in shape. Each tower one topped with a spire. The tympanum of the north tower depicts the birth of Christ; the south tower's tympanum depicts the Ascension of Jesus.

Stone walls on each side of the church include buttresses with a vaulted arch over each bay. The end wall of each transept contains arched windows flanked with buttresses. The gable decoration on the south transept has a statue of Saint Henry set in a niche; the north transept niche holds a statue of Saint Boniface.

=== Interior ===
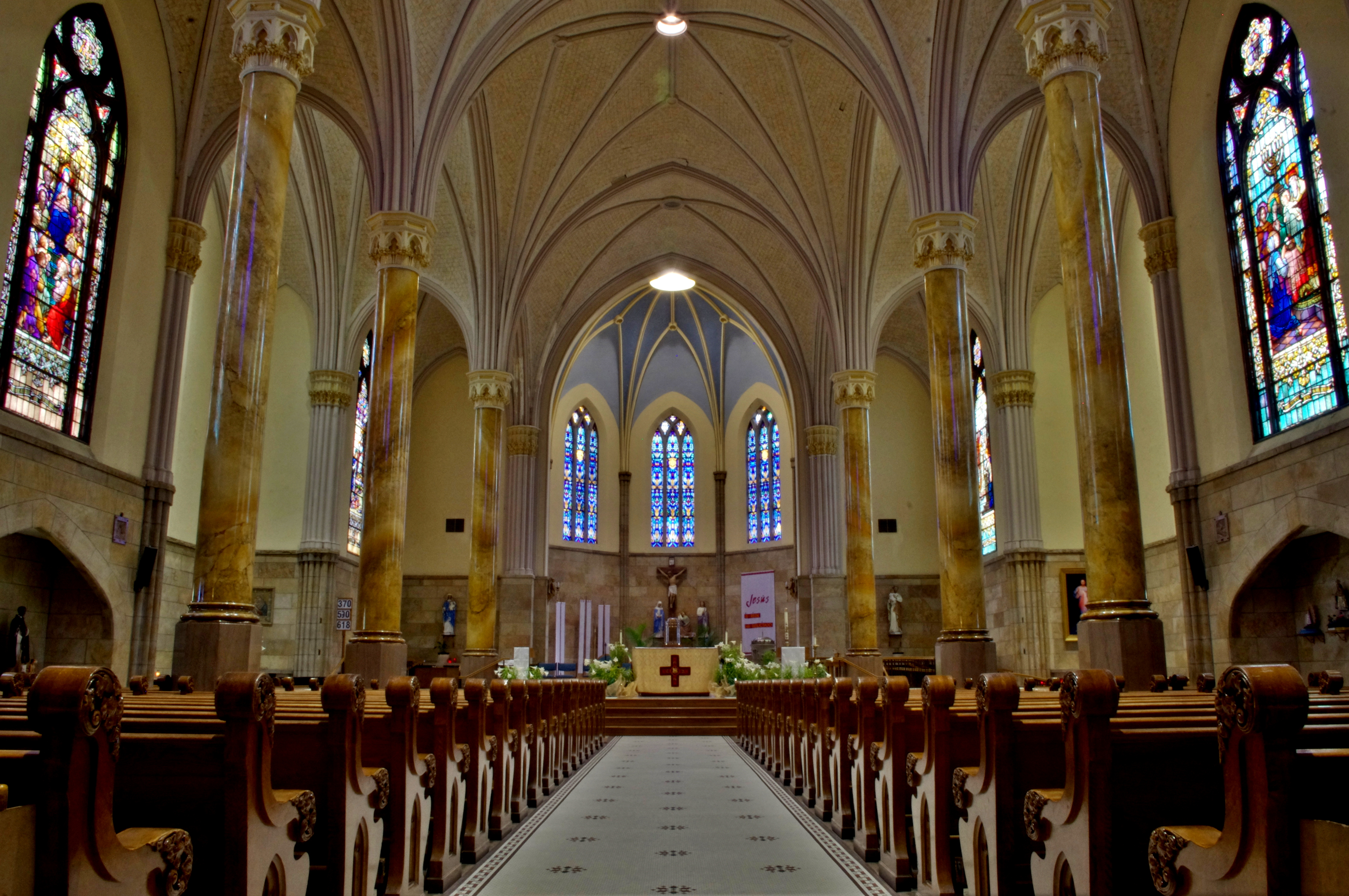
The church nave

The interior has a vaulted ceiling and a semi-octagonal apse. The sanctuary has many statues, several skylights, and art glass windows. On the north side, a stained-glass window depicts St. Boniface, the saint who converted the Germans to Christianity. On the south side, another window depicts St. Henry of Uppsala, the "church builder."

== Services ==
As of 2019 the parish remains under the jurisdiction of the Archdiocese of Indianapolis. Mass is celebrated on Sundays, 8 a.m. (bilingual:English and Spanish), 10:30 a.m. (English), and 1:15 p.m. (Spanish); Saturdays, 5 p.m. (English); Weekdays, Mon.–Fri., 12 p.m.; and Holy Days, 12 p.m. (English) and 7 p.m. (Spanish).

== See also ==
- Lockerbie Square Historic District
- National Register of Historic Places listings in Center Township, Marion County, Indiana
