= Werner Riess =

German Ancient Historian (born 1970)

Werner Riess (born 8 August 1970 at Altötting, Germany) is a German Ancient Historian.

== Life ==
Riess studied History, German literature and language as well as Romance languages at the universities of Augsburg, Germany and Tours, France from 1990 through 1996. In 2000, he received his doctorate in Ancient History from the University of Heidelberg, Germany for a dissertation titled "Apuleius und die Räuber. Ein Beitrag zur historischen Kriminalitätsforschung." This study was awarded the Ruprecht-Karls-Prize of the University of Heidelberg. Riess was "Wissenschaftlicher Angestellter" (roughly equivalent to Assistant Professor) in the Seminar für Alte Geschichte und Epigraphik of the University of Heidelberg from 1999 through 2003.

During the academic year 2002/03, Riess held a Feodor Lynen-Fellowship from the Alexander von Humboldt-Foundation, which enabled him to teach and do research at Emory University, Atlanta, Georgia. In 2004, Riess joined the faculty in the Department of Classics at the University of North Carolina at Chapel Hill. After a research stint at the Harvard Center for Hellenic Studies at Washington, DC (2007/08), Riess earned the Habilitation at the University of Augsburg, Germany in 2008 for a thesis titled The Social Drama of Violence: A Cultural History of Interpersonal Violence in Fourth-Century BCE Athens. In 2007, Riess was promoted to the rank of Associate Professor at the University of North Carolina at Chapel Hill. He lives in the USA.

His research interests include the cultural history of classical Athens, the social history of the Roman Empire, the Second Sophistic (especially Apuleius) as well as forms of conflict, violence, and crime in Graeco-Roman antiquity.

== Writings ==
- Apuleius und die Räuber. Ein Beitrag zur historischen Kriminalitätsforschung. Franz Steiner-Verlag, Stuttgart 2001 (Heidelberger Althistorische Beiträge und Epigraphische Studien Bd. 35).
- (Hrsg): Paideia at Play: Learning and Wit in Apuleius. Barkhuis Publisher, Groningen 2008 (Ancient Narrative vol. 11).
- The Topography of Violence in the Greco-Roman World, with G. G. Fagan. (University of Michigan Press, 2016, ISBN 978-0-472-11982-0).
