= Hermann J. Gaul =

American architect

- Born: 1869; Cologne, Germany
- Died: 1949 (aged 79–80); Chicago, Illinois, United States

Hermann J. Gaul (1869–1949) was an American architect of German descent, who designed a number of Catholic churches, schools, convents and rectories in Missouri, Illinois, Indiana, and elsewhere.

== Personal life ==
Born in Cologne, Germany in 1869 Gaul came to the U.S. at the turn of the 20th century. He settled in Chicago, Illinois and, after apprenticing for a time with noted Chicago architect Louis Sullivan, established an architectural firm under his own name in 1902. During his long and distinguished career he designed many landmark buildings for Roman Catholic clients throughout the Midwest.

Gaul’s son Michael F. Gaul (1913-1996) joined his father’s firm, now known as Hermann J. Gaul and Son, in the early 1930s and carried on the practice after his father’s retirement in 1948.

Several of Gaul’s buildings have been placed on the U.S. National Register of Historic Places.

== Works include ==
- Sacred Heart Church, Whiting, Indiana
- St. John the Baptist Church, Hammond, Indiana
- St. Benedict Church, Chicago, Illinois
- St. Mary Church and Academy, Indianapolis, Indiana
- Holy Hill National Shrine of Mary, Help of Christians, Hubertus, Wisconsin
- Angel Guardian Orphanage, (now Misericordia North), Chicago, Illinois
- St. Michael Church, Old Town, Chicago, Illinois (extensive exterior remodeling of original 1873 church, carried out in 1913)
- St. Peter and Paul Church, Naperville, Illinois
- St Nicholas Church, Evanston, Illinois
- Notre Dame Roman Catholic Convent, Waterdown, Ontario. Canada
- Greystone Mansion, Logan Square, Chicago, Illinois
- Former Mallinckrodt College, Wilmette, Illinois
- St. Philomena Church, Chicago, Illinois
- Immaculate Conception Church (now Monastery of the Holy Cross) Bridgeport, Chicago, Illinois
- Divine Word Monastery, Chapel of the Holy Spirit, Techny, Illinois
- St. Joseph School, Wilmette, Illinois
- St. Mary Church, Decatur, Indiana
- St. Margaret Church, Lake Henry, Minnesota
- St. Monica Church, Mishawaka, Indiana
- St. Mary Church, New Ulm, Minnesota (1922)
- Our Lady of Good Counsel Chapel, Mankato, Minnesota (1924)
- Holy Rosary Church, North Mankato, Minnesota (1924)
