= Conrad of Parzham =

German Capuchin lay brother canonized by the Catholic Church

Saint Conrad of Parzham OFM Cap
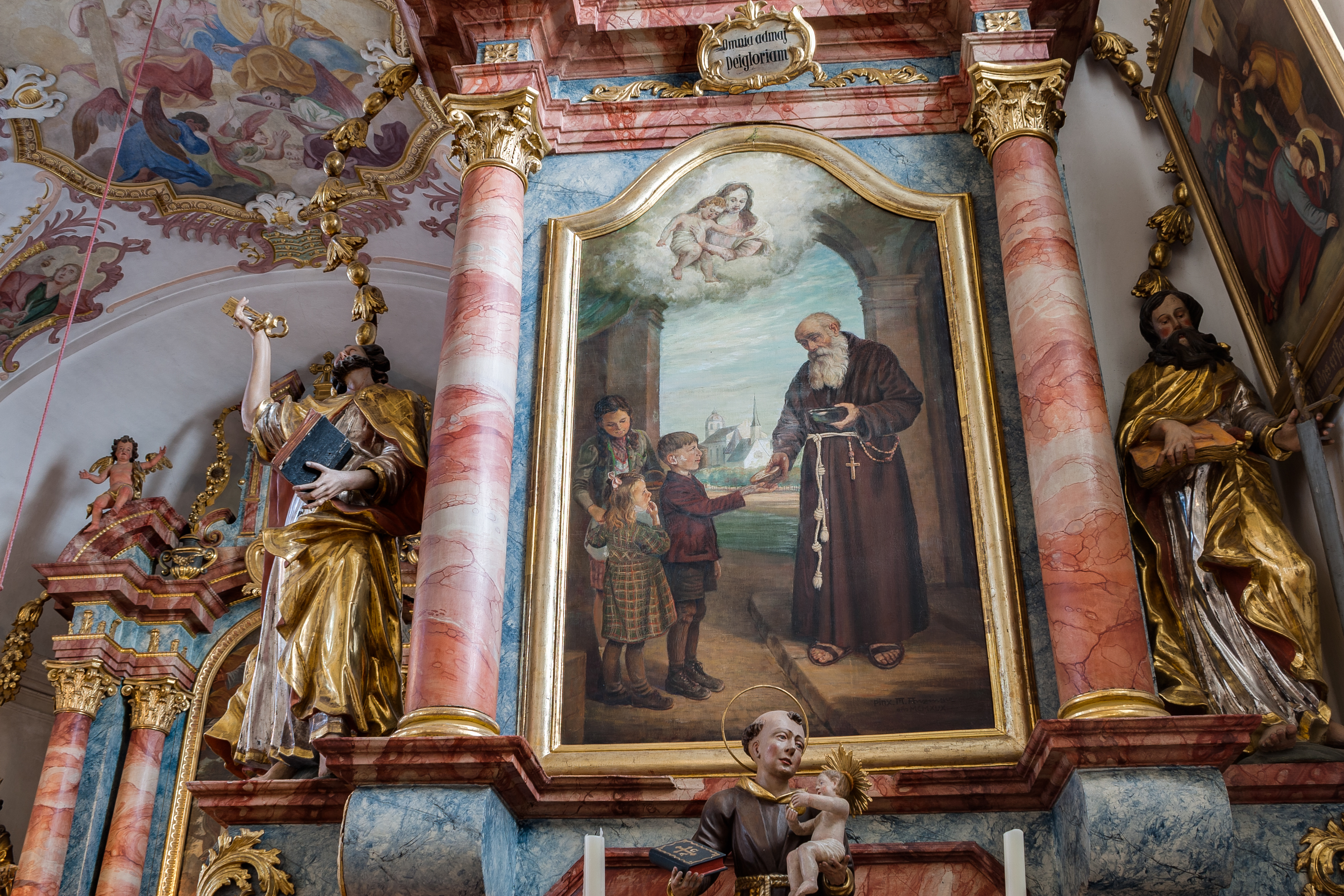
- Altarpiece painting of St. Conrad in the Church of the Assumption, Bad Endorf, Bavaria, Germany
- Born: Johann Birndorfer; 22 December 1818; Bad Griesbach, Passau, Kingdom of Bavaria
- Died: 21 April 1894 (aged 75); Altötting, Kingdom of Bavaria
- Venerated in: Catholic Church (Franciscans)
- Beatified: 15 June 1930, Saint Peter's Basilica, by Pope Pius XI
- Canonized: 20 May 1934, Saint Peter's Basilica, by Pope Pius XI
- Feast: 21 April

Conrad of Parzham (22 December 1818 – 21 April 1894) was a German Capuchin lay brother who served for over 40 years in the post of porter of the Capuchin friary in Altötting. During his time there, he gained a widespread reputation for his wisdom and holiness. He is venerated as a saint in the Catholic Church and his feast is 21 April.

== Life ==
=== Early life ===
Born 22 December 1818, he was baptized with the name of John, the son of Bartholomäus Birndorfer and Gertrude Niedermayer, and was born on the family farm in Parzham, now a part of the town of Bad Griesbach, then in the Kingdom of Bavaria, now part of Germany. Baptized Johann Evangelist, he was the second youngest of 12 children, five of whom died in infancy.

At the age of six, he started elementary school in nearby Weng. His devotion was noticeable, especially when he prayed in church. The distant location was no hindrance to his visiting it frequently, even in inclement weather. He had a great devotion to the Blessed Virgin, and each day fervently recited the rosary. On feast days he frequently made a journey to some remote shrine of the Blessed Mother. During such pilgrimages, always made on foot, he was engaged in prayer, and when he returned in the evening, he was usually still fasting.

John spent his early years on the family farm. His mother died when he was 14; his father two years later. After attending a parish mission in 1838, he decided to enter the religious life. The following year, at the age of 31, and after distributing his inheritance, he was admitted as a lay brother among the Capuchin friars.

=== Brother Porter ===
Immediately after his profession in 1842 he was sent to the friary of St. Anna, in the city of Altötting. The friary served the Shrine of Our Lady of Altötting, the national shrine of Bavaria to the Blessed Mother. Conrad was given the task of assisting the porter at this shrine. In March 1851, he had to leave Altötting to go to Burghausen to care for a dying priest. The following September, he entered the novitiate at Laufen, where he was given the religious name Conrad in honor of Conrad of Piacenza. Br. Conrad then returned to Altötting as porter.

Conrad served in a large and busy city as a friary porter. Conrad was known to be diligent at his work, sparing in words, bountiful to the poor, eager and ready to receive and help strangers. He fulfilled the task of porter for more than 40 years, assisting the inhabitants of the town in their needs of body and soul. Conrad loved silence in a special way. His spare moments during the day were spent in a nook near the door where it was possible for him to see and adore the Blessed Sacrament. During the night he would deprive himself of several hours of sleep to devote the time to prayer either in the oratory of the friars or in the church. It was generally believed that he never took any rest, but continually occupied himself in work and exercises of devotion. On 21 April 1894, Conrad died in the friary where he had served for 41 years.

== Beatification process ==
Conrad was reputed to have been able to read the hearts of those he met, and he was attributed with the gift of prophecy. His heroic virtue and the miracles he performed won for him the distinction to be ranked among the Blessed by Pope Pius XI in 1930. Four years later, the same pope, approving additional miracles which had been performed, solemnly inscribed his name in the list of saints.

Br. Conrad is the patron saint of the Mid-America Province of Capuchin Friars. Since 1984 he also is patron saint of the diocese of Passau.
