= Abraham Megerle =

Austrian composer and organist

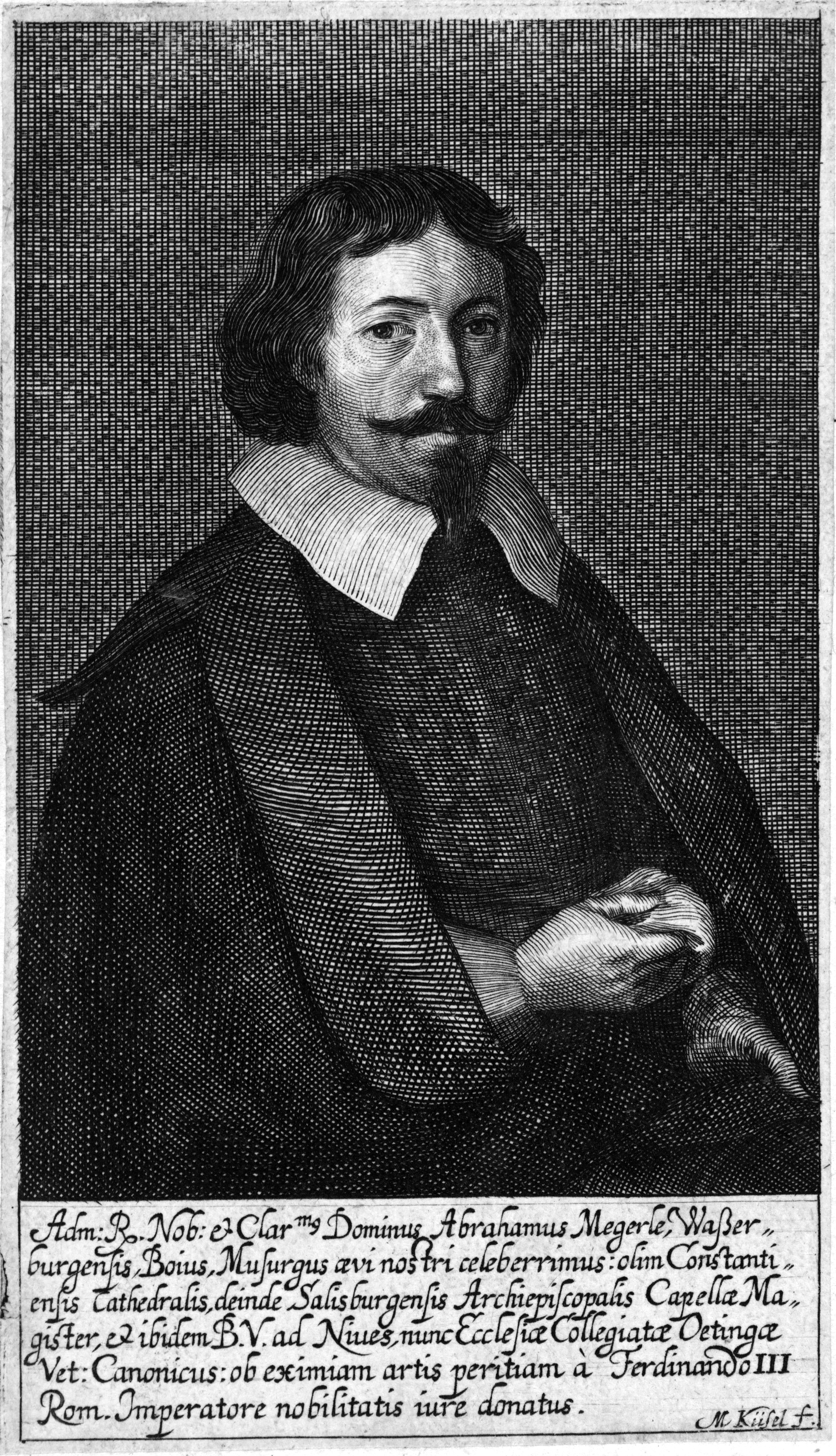
- Abraham Megerle.
- Born: 9 February 1607; Wasserburg am Inn
- Died: 29 May 1680 (aged 73); Altötting
- Occupation(s): organist and composer

Abraham Megerle (9 February 1607 in Wasserburg am Inn – 29 May 1680 in Altötting) was an Austrian composer and organist. He served as Kapellmeister to Paris von Lodron, the Prince-Bishop of Salzburg, from 1640 to 1651. He enjoyed the patronage of Emperor Ferdinand III who made him a member of the nobility in 1652. A highly prolific writer of mainly sacred music, his output exceeded more than 2000 music compositions. Most of his works are now lost. Of particular interest to music scholars is his 1672 autobiography, Speculum musico-mortuale, which is a typical example of the baroque way of viewing music.

His nephew is the monk Abraham a Sancta Clara.
