= Shrine of Our Lady of Altötting =

Bavarian Marian shrine and pilgrimage site

Coordinates: 48°13′35″N 12°40′36″E

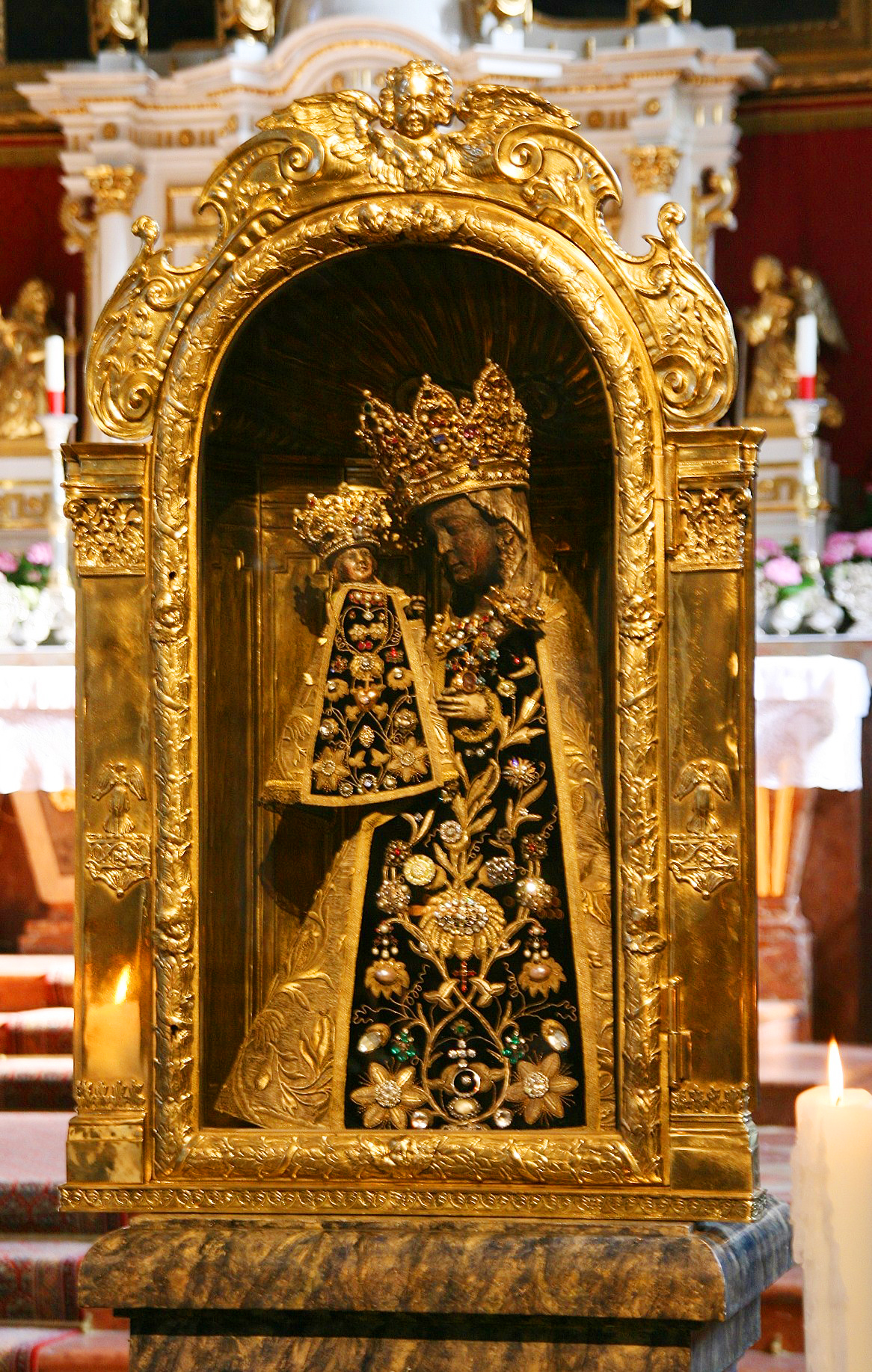
Miraculous image of Our Lady of Altötting in the Chapel of Grace

The Shrine of Our Lady of Altötting, also known as the "Chapel of Grace" (German: Gnadenkapelle), is dedicated to the Virgin Mary. It is the national shrine of Bavaria. As it is known for the many healings which are said to have taken place there, it is one of the most important and most visited pilgrimage destinations in Europe and is sometimes called the "Lourdes of Germany".

== Building ==
The church was originally built in the Agilolfingian style and expanded in the 15th century in the Gothic style.

As early as 748, the site was a palatinate of the Agilolfings, Dukes of Bavaria. Forty years later, Altötting became a Carolingian royal palace. The oldest part of the present chapel likely dates from this period. The early Byzantine, octagonal church of San Vitale in Ravenna may have served as a model for a ducal baptistery. In 907, the town and palace were devastated by a Hungarian invasion. Only the octagon of the baptistery survived the destruction. A nave and a spire were added to the central building, which was probably Agilolfing in its core, in 1494. An open walkway around the chapel followed in 1517. The sacristy was added in 1686.

== Image of Our Lady ==
Besides the natural darkening of the wood, the Altötting image is primarily blackened by the candle soot of centuries and is therefore known as a Black Madonna. It was created possibly around 1330 and carved from lindenwood. The identity of the artist who carved the image of Altötting is not known.

Many of the votive offerings and ex-votos given to the shrine over the centuries are displayed on the porch encircling the church. Also to be seen are the small, silver urns in which many members of the high nobility would have their hearts placed after their deaths so that they could be brought to the chapel.

== History ==
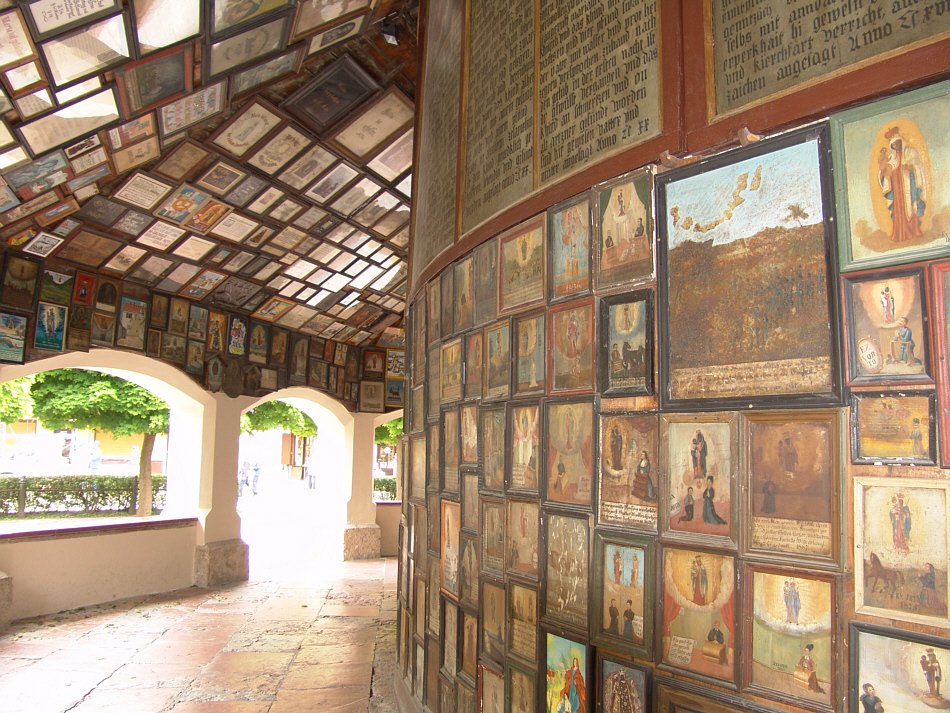
Votive paintings in the ambulatory

The octagonal chapel which now houses the image of Our Lady was built around 660, and is the oldest Marian shrine in Germany. The shrine became a popular pilgrim destination once it became well-known for the alleged miraculous recovery of a three-year old boy who had fallen into the Mörnbach stream in 1489, been carried away by the current, and presumed drowned. The boy's mother laid his lifeless body on the altar in front of the Marian image and prayed with other people of the parish for a miracle. After a short time, life returned to the seemingly dead child. Legend has it that the boy was later ordained a priest.

The shrine has been maintained by the Capuchin friars since 1802. One member of the order, Conrad of Parzham, served there as porter for over 40 years. During his lifetime of service, he developed a reputation for humility and holiness.

In the 20th century, the Chapel of Grace was visited by Popes Pius VI and John Paul II. Pope John Paul II visited the shrine in November 1980, accompanied by Joseph Cardinal Ratzinger, who was born in a nearby town. On 11 September 2006, Ratzinger, then Pope Benedict XVI, returned to the shrine and laid down the episcopal ring he had worn while he was the Archbishop of Munich and Freising at the feet of Our Lady of Altötting. The ring is now a part of the scepter held by Mary.

A unique feature is that the Black Madonna is conceiled with a black veil on the morning of Good Friday, and remains covered until after the Easter Vigil. This is meant to symbolize Mary's deep sorrow over the crucifixion of her son.

The veneration of the miraculous image by kissing it on Ash Wednesday, during which the Madonna is wrapped in a blue veil, dates back to the time of the Thirty Years' War, as Prelate Mandl explained, and Maximilian I, Elector of Bavaria travelled to Altötting at that time with his entire court to ask the Virgin Mary to spare Bavaria from the horrors of war.

== See also ==
- Shrines to Mary, mother of Jesus
