= Holy See (disambiguation) =

The Holy See is the apostolic episcopal see of the bishop of Rome, known as the Pope.

Holy See may also refer to:

- Holy See of Alexandria, see of the Coptic Orthodox Patriarchate of Alexandria, and of the Greek Orthodox Patriarchate of Alexandria
- Holy See of Antioch, historical see of the Syriac Orthodox Patriarchate of Antioch, and of the Greek Orthodox Patriarchate of Antioch
- Holy See of Cilicia, the Armenian Catholicosate of the Great House of Cilicia, located in Antelias, Lebanon
- Holy See of Constantinople, see of the Ecumenical Patriarchate of Constantinople
- Holy See of Jerusalem, multiple sees
- Holy See of Mainz, the historic title of the Diocese of Mainz in Germany

== See also ==
- HolyC, the system programming language in TempleOS
