= Porter (monastery) =

Monk or nun who interacts with the public

In a monastery, the porter is the monk (or portress for a nun) appointed to be the one who interacts with the public. It is considered an important office, as the porter is the representative of the community to the outside world. The person is stationed at the front door and responsible for greeting visitors to the monastery.

The Rule of Saint Benedict, in chapter 66, gives specific advice as to the qualifications of the person chosen to serve in this post.

At the door of the monastery, place a sensible old man who knows how to take a message and deliver a reply, and whose age keeps him from roaming about. As soon as anyone knocks, or a poor man calls out, he replies, 'Thanks be to God' or 'Your blessing, please'; then, with all the gentleness that comes from the fear of God, he provides a prompt answer with the warmth of love.

The porter needs to be someone with a gift for dealing humanely with visitors. The poor must be treated gently because they are specially loved by God. Since they have no natural prestige and are often devoid of polish and manners, the temptation is to handle them roughly. "Visitors are Christ-bearers – we must hurry to them." In keeping with this advice, the porter is usually given private quarters right at the entrance to the monastery, which can lie some distance from the cloister, thus the need for a very responsible person to fill this position.

Among Franciscan communities, a large portion of the lay brothers who have achieved sainthood had spent their lives in the office of porter of the community, such as Paschal Baylon, Didacus of Alcalá, and Felix of Cantalice. There is also an American candidate for canonization, Solanus Casey, who was a Catholic priest, but, due to the limitations of his academic capabilities, served as a porter in both Detroit and New York City for over 30 years. The Jesuits have their own holy porters in the persons of Alphonsus Rodriguez and Francisco Gárate Aranguren, as do the Congregation of Holy Cross in André Bessette (Frère André) of Montreal.

== See also ==
- Conrad of Parzham
- Ostiarius
