= Armin =

- Gender: Masculine
- Name day: June 2

Other gender
- Feminine: Armina

Origin
- Origin: Germanic and Persian
- Derivation: Arminius & Ariobarzanes
- Meaning: Guardian / Hero
- Region of origin: Western Europe, Western Asia

Other names
- Variant form: Ermin
- Related names: Arvin

Armin is a male given name and surname of Indo-European origin.

== Origin ==
=== Historical Germanic and Iranic name ===
Historical records of Armin as a forename appear independently from two different sources:

- Germanic
  - Armin is the modern form of Arminius who was a German prince. He is mostly known for defeating the Roman army in Battle of the Teutoburg Forest. The Latinized name of "Arminius" itself comes form an ancient Germanic name that may have derived from elemental noun "ermen" which means "whole" or "universal" in essence.
- Iranic
  - Armin was the fourth son of Kai Kobad who is a fantastical character in the Shahnameh book of poetry in certain texts. He belonged to the Kayanian dynasty in Persian literature and mythology.
  - Armin is the short form of "Āriya-bṛdāna" whose hellenized name is Ariobarzanes. He was a Persian prince and satrap who fought against Alexander the Great.

=== Bosniak ===
In the Balkans, Armin is popular among Bosniaks in the former Yugoslav nations. The name is a modification of Amin, following a pattern similar to the modification of Anel to Arnel. This region also has a female equivalent: Armina. The name became especially popular in the region after the 2007 Croatian-Bosnian drama film Armin.

== Given name ==
- Arminius, Germanic tribal leader who fought against the Romans
- Armin Aberle (born 1960), German semiconductor scientist
- Armin Abron (born 1975), American periodontist
- Armin Alesevic (born 1994), Swiss footballer of Bosnian descent
- Armin Andres (born 1959), German basketball player
- Armin Assinger (born 1964), Austrian alpine skier
- Armin Bačinović (born 1989), Slovenian footballer
- Armin Bauer (born 1990), Italian Nordic combined skier
- Armin Baumgarten (born 1967), German sculptor and painter
- Armin Baumgartner (born 1950), Swiss bobsledder
- Armin Bittner (born 1964), German alpine skier
- Armin von Bogdandy (born 1960), German legal scholar
- Armin Bošnjak (born 1994), Montenegrin footballer
- Armin Brott (born 1958), American author, columnist and radio host
- Armin Büchel (born 1945), Liechtenstein judoka
- Armin von Büren (1928–2018), Swiss cyclist
- Armin Ćerimagić (born 1994), Bosnian footballer
- Armin B. Cremers (born 1946), German computer scientist
- Armin Dahlen (1919–2013), Austrian actor
- Armin Dassler (1929–1990), German businessman, CEO of Puma
- Armin Delong (1925–2017), Czechoslovak physicist
- Armin Joseph Deutsch (1918–1969), American astronomer and science fiction writer
- Armin Đerlek (born 2000), Serbian footballer
- Armin Eck (born 1964), German footballer and manager
- Armin Eichholz (born 1964), German rower
- Armin Emrich (born 1951), German handball player and coach
- Armin Faber, German World War II fighter pilot
- Armin Falk (born 1968), German economist
- Armin Franulic (1943–2021), Bolivian rally driver
- Armin Frauscher (born 1994), Austrian luger
- Armin Frieder (1911–1946), Slovak rabbi
- Armin Garnreiter (born 1958), German archer
- Armin Ganz (1948–1995), American designer
- Armin von Gerkan (1885–1969), Baltic German classical archaeologist
- Armin Gessert (1963–2009), German computer game developer
- Armin Geus (born 1937), German medical historian
- Armin Gigović (born 2002), Bosnian footballer
- Armin Görtz (born 1959), German football player
- Armin Grau (born 1959), German politician
- Armin Gremsl (born 1994), Austrian footballer
- Armin Gruen (born 1944), German geodesists
- Armin Guhl (1907–1981), Swiss decathlete
- Armin Hadipour (born 1994), Iranian taekwondo practitioner
- Armin Hahne (born 1955), German racing driver
- Armin-Paul Hampel (born 1957), German politician
- Armin Hamzic (born 1993), Austrian footballer
- Armin Hansen (1886–1957), American painter
- Armin Hary (born 1937), the first non-American to win the Olympic 100 m since 1928
- Armin Helfer (born 1980), Italian ice hockey player
- Armin Hodžić (footballer, born 1994), Bosnian footballer
- Armin Hodžić (footballer, born 2000) (born 2000), Bosnian footballer
- Armin Hodžić (politician), Bosniak-Croatian politician
- Armin Hofer (born 1987), Italian ice hockey player
- Armin Hofmann (1920–2020), Swiss graphic designer
- Armin Jäger (born 1962), German footballer
- Ármin Jamak (born 1993), Hungarian indie musician
- Armin Jordan (1932–2006), Swiss conductor
- Armin Karima, British actor
- Armin Kellersberger (1838–1905), Swiss politician
- Armin Kerer (born 1972), Italian javelin thrower
- Armin Kircher (1966–2015), Austrian composer and conductor
- Armin Knab (1881–1951), German composer and musical writer
- Armin Kogler (born 1959), Austrian ski jumper
- Armin Kõomägi (born 1969), Estonian writer and screenwriter
- Armin Kraaz (born 1965), German football player and manager
- Armin Kraeft (1909–2000), American football and baseball coach
- Armin Kremer (born 1968), German rally driver
- Armin Krings (born 1962), Luxembourgish footballer
- Armin Krugel, Swiss Nordic combined skier
- Armin Landeck (1905–1984), American artist
- Armin Laschet (born 1961), German politician
- Armin D. Lehmann (1928–2008), German activist
- Armin Lemme (1955–2021), East German discus thrower
- Armin Otto Leuschner (1868–1953), American astronomer and educator
- Armin K. Lobeck (1886–1958), American cartographer, geomorphologist and landscape artist
- Armin Luistro (born 1961), Filipino religious brother and Secretary of Education who is the father of the K-12 education in his country
- Armin Mahbanoozadeh (born 1991), Iranian American figure skater
- Armin Mahović (born 1991), Bosnian footballer
- Armin Mahrt (1897–1961), American football player
- Armin Mair (born 1977), Italian luger
- Armin Maier (born 1997), Malaysian professional footballer
- Armin Maiwald (born 1940), German television producer
- Armin Mašović (born 1993), Austrian footballer
- Armin Medosch (1962–2017), Austrian artist, curator, theorist and critic
- Armin Meier (cyclist) (born 1969), Swiss cyclist
- Armin Meier (actor) (1943–1978), German actor
- Armin Meiwes (born 1961), German Internet user who became known as the "Rotenburg Cannibal"
- Armin Meyer (1907–?), Argentine rower
- Armin H. Meyer (1914–2006), American diplomat
- Armin Moczek (born 1969), German evolutionary biologist
- Armin Mohler (1920–2003), Swiss far-right political philosopher
- Armin Mueller-Stahl (born 1930), German film actor
- Armin Mujakic (born 1995), Austrian footballer
- Armin Muzaferija (born 1988), Bosnian singer
- Armin Navabi (born 1983), Iranian-born ex-Muslim atheist and secular activist
- Armin Niederer (born 1987), Swiss freestyle skier
- Armin Öhri (born 1978), Liechtensteiner writer
- Armin Öpik (1898–1983), Estonian paleontologist
- Armin Baniaz Pahamin, Malaysian entrepreneur
- Armin Andreas Pangerl (born 1965), German painter, author and exhibition maker
- Armijn Pane (born 1908), Indonesian author
- Armin Pavić (1844–1914), Croatian linguist
- Armin Pfahl-Traughber (born 1963), German political scientist, sociologist and government official
- Armin Pumpanmuang (born 1987), Thai Muay Thai kickboxer
- Armin Purner, Austrian cyclist
- Armin Reichel (born 1958), German footballer
- Armin Reutershahn (born 1960), German football coach and manager
- Armin Risi (born 1962), Swiss author
- Armin Rohde (born 1955), German actor
- Armin Ronacher (born 1989), Austrian open source software programmer
- Armin Rosencranz (born 1937), American lawyer and political scientist
- Armin S., German stock trader
- Armin Scheurer (1917–1990), Swiss athlete
- Armin Schibler (1920–1986), Swiss composer
- Armin Scholz (born 1976), German bodybuilder and gym owner
- Armin Schreiner (1874–1941), Jewish Croatian industrialist killed in the Holocaust
- Armin Schuster (born 1961), German politician
- Armin Schwarz (born 1963), German rally driver
- Armin Schwarz (politician) (born 1968), German politician
- Armin Schweizer (1892–1968), Swiss actor
- Armin Shimerman (born 1949), American actor
- Armin Sinančević (born 1996), Serbian shot putter
- Armin Smajić (born 1964), Bosnian footballer and manager
- Armin Sohrabian (born 1995), Iranian footballer
- Armin Sowa (born 1959), German basketball player
- Armin Steigenberger (born 1965), German poet and writer
- Armin Stromberg (1910–2004), Russian chemist
- Armin Suppan (born 1959), Austrian composer
- Ármin Szabó-Székely (born 1987), Hungarian playwright
- Armin Tanković (born 1990), Bosnian footballer
- Armin Tashakkori (born 1986), Iranian volleyball player
- Armin Tehrany, American orthopaedic surgeon and assistant clinical professor
- Armin Thurnher (born 1949), Austrian journalist
- Armin von Tschermak-Seysenegg (1870–1952), Austrian physiologist
- Ármin Vámbéry (1832–1913), Hungarian explorer and writer
- Armin van Buuren (born 1976), Dutch trance music DJ and producer
- Armin Veh (born 1961), German footballer and manager
- Armin Vilas, Austrian bobsledder
- Armin Vock (born 1952), Swiss gymnast
- Armin T. Wegner (1886–1978), German soldier, writer, and political activist
- Armin Weier (born 1956), German wrestler
- Armin Weiss (1927–2010), German inorganic chemist and politician
- Armin Weyrauch (born 1964), German rower
- Armin Wiebe (born 1948), Canadian writer
- Armin Willingmann (born 1963), German politician
- Armin Wirth (born 1971), German DJ, record producer and record label manager
- Armin Wolf (born 1966), Austrian journalist and television anchor
- Armin Wurm (born 1989), German ice hockey player
- Armin Zimmermann (1917–1976), German admiral
- Armin Zöggeler (born 1974), Italian luger

== Surname ==
- Adele Armin (1945–2022), Canadian classical violinist
- Albie Armin (born 2004), English footballer
- Emil Armin (1883–1971), American artist
- Jart Armin, cybersecurity expert
- Mohsen Armin (born 1954), Iranian politician
- Robert Armin (c. 1563–1615), English actor, member of the Lord Chamberlain's Men

== Fictional characters ==
- Armin Arlert, supporting protagonist of the manga and anime Attack on Titan
- Armin Tamzarian, the real name of principal Seymour Skinner on The Simpsons

== See also ==
- Armen (name)
- Herman (name)
- Von Armin (disambiguation), several people
- Nepenthes armin (N. armin), a Philippine pitcher plant
- Stac an Armin, the Armin (Warrior) sea stack in Scotland
