= Anil (given name) =

Anil is a masculine name that can be found across the world in various cultures, nations and regions. A common theme across the globe is that the name holds strong weight and is used as a masculine name.

Arabic

Anil (Arabic: النيِل) is a masculine Arabic name, though less popular in Arab countries. It stems from the root words 'An" (أن/ان)' meaning 'that', and 'il (الـ)' meaning 'the'. In Arabic, it means 'Thee' or 'To be' which can be contextualised as 'the one who is exalted'.

Indian

Anil (Sanskrit: अनिल) is a masculine Indian name. In the Indian Sanskrit language it can be defined as “The God of the Air and the Wind”.

Hebrew

Anil (Hebrew: חַנִּיאֵל), the name is referenced in the Song of Songs 6:3 (Shir HaShirim) Ani L'Dodi V'Dodi Li (אני לדודי ודודי ל ) written by King and Prophet Solomon as 'I am'. There are variations of the name including, Aniel meaning 'I, God' and 'God is my Grace'.

Turkish

Anil as written within European nations, with Turkish context, is a masculine name that means 'To be remembered', 'Unforgettable' and 'Just ruler'.

Notable Individuals with the Anil first name

- Anil Ambani (born 1959), Indian business baron
- Anil Baijal, Lieutenant Governor of Delhi
- Anil Baluni, Indian politician and national spokesperson of the Bharatiya Janata Party
- Anil Basu (born 1946), Indian politician and a former member of the Communist Party of India
- Anil Bhardwaj (born 1967), Director of the Physical Research Laboratory
- Anil Bhoyrul, British journalist
- Anil Biswas (composer), (born 1914) Indian music director
- Anil Bordia (1934–2012), Indian educationist
- Anil Chatterjee (1929–1998), Indian film actor
- Anil Chaudhary (born 1965), Indian cricket umpire
- Anil Dalpat (born 1963), Pakistani cricketer
- Anil Dash (born 1975), American blogger, entrepreneur, and technologist
- Anil Devgan (born 1949), Indian film director
- Anil Dhawan, Indian film actor
- Anil Goonaratne, a Sri Lankan judge and lawyer
- Anil Gupta (writer) (born 1974), British comedy writer
- Anil K. Rajvanshi (born 1950), Indian academic
- Anil Kakodkar (born 1943), Indian nuclear scientist
- Anil Kapoor (born 1959), Indian actor
- Anil Kohli, Indian dental surgeon
- Anil Kumar (disambiguation), several people
- Anil Kumar Mandal, Indian ophthalmologist
- Anil Kumble (born 1970), Indian cricket player
- Anil Mohile (died 1991), Indian music director
- Anil Roberts, Trinidad and Tobago politician
- Anil Sharma (director), Indian film director
- Anil Srinivasan (born 1977), Indian pianist
- Anil Tissera, main character in the novel Anil's Ghost by Michael Ondaatje
- P. Anil, Indian film director

== See also ==
- Anil (disambiguation)
- Anil Agarwal (disambiguation)
- Anil Biswas (disambiguation)
- Anil Jain (disambiguation)
