= Ermin =

- Gender: Masculine

Other gender
- Feminine: Ermina

Ermin is a Bosnian masculine given name.

In the Balkans, Ermin is popular among Bosniaks in the former Yugoslav nations. It is also popular among Albanians. The name is a modification of Emin, following a pattern similar to the modification of Anel to Arnel. This region also has a female equivalent: Ermina (for example, Ermina Lekaj Prljaskaj).

Notable people with the name include:

- Ermin Alić (born 1992), Montenegrin footballer
- Ermin Bičakčić (born 1990), Bosnian footballer
- Ermin Bravo (born 1979), Bosnian actor
- Ermin Cavcic (born 2002), Dutch footballer
- Ermin Gadžo (born 1990), Bosnian footballer
- Ermin Hasić (born 1975), Slovenian footballer
- Ermin Huseinbašić (born 1993), Bosnian professional footballer
- Ermin Lepić (born 1980), Bosnian volleyball player
- Ermin Melunović (born 1973), Serbian footballer
- Ermin Musić (born 1997), Bosnian association football player
- Ermin Rakovič (born 1977), Slovenian footballer
- Ermin Seratlić (born 1990), Montenegrin footballer
- Ermin Sijamija (born 1974), Bosnian actor
- Ermin Šiljak (born 1973), Slovenian footballer
- Ermin Smrekar (1931–2016), Australian architect
- Ermin Velić (born 1959), Yugoslav handball player
- Ermin Zec (born 1988), Bosnian footballer

== See also ==
- Ermin Way, Roman Road in South England
- Ermine (disambiguation)
- Erwin (disambiguation)
- Irmin
- Armin
