= Anil =

Anil or Anıl may refer to:

== People ==
- Anil (given name), a Hebrew, Indian and Nepalese given name used around the world (including a list of persons with the name)
- Anıl (given name), a Turkish given name (including a list of persons with the name)
- Anil (director), active in the Malayalam film industry since 1989

== Other uses ==
- Anil, Rio de Janeiro, Brazil, a neighborhood
- Anıl, Hani, Turkey
- Anil (plant) (Indigofera suffruticosa), a species of flowering plant in the legume family
- Anil (chemistry), a type of imine
- Anila or Anil, a Vedic and Hindu deity

== See also ==
- Añil
- Anal (disambiguation)
- Anila (disambiguation)
- Anneal (disambiguation)
