= Abron =

Abron may refer to:

- Abron (surname)
- Abron tribe, West African ethnic group
- Abron dialect, spoken by the Abron tribe
- Abron (ancient Greece), numerous historical Greek people
