= Abron (surname) =

Abron is a surname. Notable people with the surname include:

- Armin Abron (born 1975), American dentist
- DeAndrey Abron (1972–2020), American boxer
- Donta Abron (born 1972), American football player
- Lilia Ann Abron (born 1945), American chemical engineer
