= Mount Allport =

Mountain in Enderby Land, Antarctica

Mount Allport (68°1′S 56°27′E) is a snow-free peak just west of Leslie Peak and about 5 nautical miles (9 km) south of Mount Cook of the Leckie Range. Plotted from ANARE (Australian National Antarctic Research Expeditions) air photos. Named by Antarctic Names Committee of Australia (ANCA) for B. Allport, radio officer at Mawson Station in 1964, a member of one of the survey parties which carried out a tellurometer traverse passing through the Leckie Range in 1965.
