= Mount Saw =

Mountain in Antarctica

Mount Saw (68°11′S 56°44′E) is an isolated mountain about 17 nautical miles (31 km) south-southeast of Mount Cook of the Leckie Range. Plotted from ANARE (Australian National Antarctic Research Expeditions) air photos. Named by Antarctic Names Committee of Australia (ANCA) for B. Saw, helicopter pilot with the 1965 ANARE (Nella Dan), led by Phillip Law.
