= Anel =

Anel may refer to:

- Anel (given name), a male given name
- Anel (actress), Mexican actress and model
- Independent Greeks (ANEL), a national conservative political party in Greece
