= Anila (disambiguation) =

Anila (अनिल) is a Hindu deity.

Anila may also refer to:

== Given name ==
- Anila Quayyum Agha (born 1965), Pakistani–American cross-disciplinary artist
- Anila Bhediya (born 1967), Indian politician, former Minister of Child and Woman Welfare of Chhattisgarh
- Anila Bitri (born 1963), Albanian diplomat
- Anila Naz Chowdhury (born 1979), Bangladeshi singer
- Anila Dalal (born 1933), Indian critic and translator
- Anila Denaj (born 1973), Albanian politician, former Minister of Agriculture and Rural Development
- Anila Jacob (born c. 1941), Indian sculptor
- Anila Mirza (born 1974), Danish singer
- Anila Paparisto, 21st century Albanian entomologist and taxonomist
- Anila Sreekumar (born 1970), Indian actress
- Anila Sunder (born 1951), Indian classical dancer
- Anila Wilms (born 1971), Albanian writer
- Anila, a competitor on Albania's Big Brother season 5

== Other uses ==
- Anila (頞儞羅), one of the Twelve Heavenly Generals of Buddhism
- Anila, an obsolete genus name for the species Indigofera australis

== See also ==
- Anilai and Asinai, two Babylonian-Jewish robber chieftains of the Parthian Empire
- Anilao, Mabini, Batangas, a section of the municipality of Mabini, Batangas, Philippines
- Anilao, Iloilo, a municipality in the Philippines
