= Ermine (disambiguation) =

Ermine may refer to three species of mustelid in the genus Mustela, or their fur:

- Stoat or Eurasian ermine, Mustela erminea, found throughout Eurasia and northern North America
- American ermine, Mustela richardsonii, found throughout North America aside from most of Alaska and the Arctic
- Haida ermine, Mustela haidarum, endemic to Haida Gwaii and the Alexander Archipelago on the Pacific Northwest coast of North America

Ermine may also refer to:

- Ermine (heraldry), the white winter fur and black tail end of the stoat, which is historically worn by and associated with royalty and high officials
- "Ermine marks" are dark patches of color on the white limb of a horse, just above the level of the hoof
- Ermine moth, a family of moths
- Ermine, Lincoln, a northern suburb of the city of Lincoln, England
- Ermine Street, a Roman Road running from London to Lincoln and York
- Ermine, Kentucky, a town in the U.S. state of Kentucky
- Ermine (band), a Canadian progressive rock band

== See also ==
- Ermin
- Ermina
- Erminie, a 19th-century comic opera
- Hermine (disambiguation)
