= Djtunes =

German online music store

Djtunes.com
- Website type: e-commerce
- Available in: English, German, Spain
- Founded: 2005
- Headquarters: Vachendorf, Traunstein
- Area served: Worldwide
- Owner: DANCE ALL DAY Musicvertriebs GmbH
- Founders: Thimo U. Seidel, Timo Becker, Dr. Achim Illner, Marc N. Grotholtmann
- Key people: Armin Wirth (CEO)
- Industry: retail
- Products: djtunes.com
- Website: DJTunes
- Registration: Tiered À la carte

Djtunes.com (branded DJTUNES.COM or simply DjTunes) was a German-based multinational online music store for all dance music genres.

Purchases can be made for individual tracks, bundled releases, albums or charts. Users can add their own productions to the Djtunes catalogue, to sell their tracks and releases directly on the website (UGC). Additionally the site offers multiple social networking features.

Djtunes considers itself as a part of an international music scene and is in constant communication with artists, labels and distributors whose feedback is incorporated into continuous development of the site.

The company is run by CEO Thimo U. Seidel and currently consists of more than 20 employees.

In July 2018, the homepage redirected to a page on Djshop's website announcing the shutdown of DjTunes. Further press statement indicated that digital music sales had been terminated on Djshop as well, in a global market shift towards streaming.

== History and market position ==
Djtunes.com GmbH was established in Gelsenkirchen, Germany by Thimo U. Seidel, Dr. Achim Illner, Timo Becker and Marc N. Grotholtmann in 2005. The first version of Djtunes was launched in 2006.

This year the company received an investment from High-Tech Gründerfonds.

The company began as an online Dance music store. In 2007 the company moved its headquarters to Bochum, Germany, where it launched Djtunes 2.0 and replaced its predecessor. The second version of the site included community and social network features.

In 2008 the start-up company won two further investors: the MP3 co-inventor Professor Dr. Karlheinz Brandenburg and BM-T beteiligungsmanagement Thüringen GmbH branch office was founded in the neighbourhood of the Fraunhofer-Institute for Digital Media Technology (IDMT) inside the TU Ilmenau campus to promote technologically based product innovations. ^{,}

In September 2009 the company launched its own affiliate program, allowing publishers to market the Djtunes content and earn commission.

In February 2013 Feiyr, an online music and ebook distributor, adopts Djtunes. Feiyr is a subsidiary of Dance All Day GmbH, founded by its CEO Armin Wirth. Since then a lot of new features and improvements have been realized at Djtunes for example a new download process which is much more simple as well as a new generated search engine.

=== Market position ===
Among the top download sites for electronic music, alongside Beatport and DJDownload, Djtunes ranks as Germany's and one of Europe's leading download platforms for special musical interest.

== Content ==
The Djtunes catalogue includes DRM free tracks from electronic dance music genres, such as House, Dance, Techno, Electro, Minimal, etc. The tracks are available to download in 320 or 128 kbps MP3 format. These are encoded using the LAME codec.

Djtunes works with Content Aggregators and labels, including: Toolroom, Phonetic, Blackhole, Armada, Ultra Records, Cr2, Ministry of Sound, Cocoon, Great Stuff, Azuli, Strictly Rhythm, Boys Noize & more. There are tracks that cannot be purchased by some users due to territorial sale restrictions. This is a result of licensing agreements made between the original copyright owner and one or more record labels who negotiate sub-licenses to sell content in specific territories.

== UGC feature ==
In 2007 Djtunes became the first online shop in the electronic dance music industry to offer a User generated content feature. Through the UGC feature artists without label contracts have the opportunity to upload and sell their unsigned productions. ^{,} The revenue is split 50% – 50% between the artist and the shop. To have access to the UGC feature users must upgrade their account to an artist account.
