= Mount Treatt =

Mountain in Antarctica

Mount Treatt (68°0′S 56°48′E) is the easternmost of three peaks rising sharply from the ice plateau about 9 nautical miles (17 km) southeast of Mount Cook of the Leckie Range. Plotted from ANARE (Australian National Antarctic Research Expeditions) air photos. Named for G. Treatt, helicopter pilot with the 1965 ANARE (Nella Dan), led by Phillip Law.
