= Mount Cook (disambiguation) =

Aoraki / Mount Cook, formerly named just as Mount Cook, is the highest mountain in New Zealand.

Mount Cook may also refer to:

- Mount Cook Village, the settlement at the base of the New Zealand mountain
- Aoraki / Mount Cook National Park, the National Park including the mountain and its surrounds
- Mount Cook Airline, a regional New Zealand airline
- Mount Cook Group, a former New Zealand transport and tourism company
- Mount Cook of rivers, nickname for the Waitaha River in Westland, New Zealand
- Mount Cook (Antarctica)
- Mount Cook (Saint Elias Mountains) in Canada/USA
- Mount Cook, Wellington, a suburb of Wellington, New Zealand
- Mount Cook near Cooktown, Queensland, Australia

== See also ==
- Mount Cooke (Western Australia)
