= Irmin =

Irmin may refer to:

- Irmin Henkel (1921–1977) South African artist
- Irmin Schmidt (born 1937), German keyboardist and composer
- Irmin, hypothetical son of Mannus, a figure in the creation myths of the Germanic tribes
- See Irminsul for other meanings of the word

== See also ==
- Ermin
- Ermine (disambiguation)
