= Inel =

Male given name

- Gender: Male

Other gender
- Feminine: Inela

Origin
- Meaning: Righteous ruler, just emperor, to be remembered forever

Other names
- Variant form: Anel

Inel is a male given name.

In the Balkans, Inel is popular among Bosniaks in the former Yugoslav nations. The name is a modification of Anel, another popular name in the region. The female equivalent to the name is Inela (for example, Inela Nogić).

== Given name ==
- Inel Tomlinson (born 1984), British actor
- Inel Qaghan, Turkic Khaganate ruler
