= Leslie Peak =

Mountain in Antarctica

Leslie Peak (68°0′S 56°30′E) is a rock outcrop with a conical peak at its south end, about 5 nautical miles (9 km) south of Mount Cook of the Leckie Range, Antarctica. It was plotted from Australian National Antarctic Research Expeditions air photos, and was named by the Antarctic Names Committee of Australia for Leslie Miller, a radio officer at Mawson Station in 1964, and a member of one of the survey parties which carried out a tellurometer traverse passing through the Leckie Range in 1965.
