= Von Armin =

- Friedrich Sixt von Armin (1851 1936), German general in World War I
- Hans-Heinrich Sixt von Armin (1890–1952), German lieutenant general in World War II
- Elizabeth von Arnim (1866 1941)

== See also ==
- Armin (disambiguation)
