= Tryphon (grammarian) =

Ancient Greek grammarian

Tryphon or Trypho (Greek: Τρύφων, gen.: Τρύφωνος; c. 60 BC – 10 BC) was a Greek grammarian who lived and worked in Alexandria. He was a contemporary of Didymus Chalcenterus.

He wrote several specialized works on aspects of language and grammar, from which only a handful of fragments now survive. These included treatises on word-types, dialects, accentuation, pronunciation, and orthography, as well as a grammar (Τέχνη Γραμματική, Tékhne grammatiké) and a dictionary. The two extant works that bear his name, On Meters and On Tropes, may or may not be by him. He had a pupil named Abron.
