= Spielwang =

- Ortsteil of Vachendorf
- Interactive map of Spielwang
- Location within Germany Location within Bavaria
- Coordinates: 47.845°N 12.600°E
- Country: Germany
- State: Bavaria
- District: Traunstein
- Municipality: Vachendorf
- Time zone: UTC+01:00 (CET)
  - Summer (DST): UTC+02:00 (CEST)

Spielwang (German pronunciation: [ˈʃpiːlvaŋ]) is a small village within the municipality of Vachendorf in the district of Traunstein in Bavaria, Germany.

It is not far away from the Chiemsee.
