= Donta Abron =

American football player (born 1972)

Personal information
- Born: July 4, 1972 (age 54)
- Listed height: 5 ft 9 in (1.75 m)
- Listed weight: 180 lb (82 kg)

Career information
- College: Northern Arizona University

Career history
- 1995–1996: Baltimore Stallions
- 1997: Albany Firebirds
- 1998: Grand Rapids Rampage

Donta Abron (born July 4, 1972) is an American former football player who played college football at Northern Arizona Lumberjacks and professional football for the Baltimore Stallions of the Canadian Football League and the Albany Firebirds and Grand Rapids Rampage of the Arena Football League.

== Professional career ==
On March 22, 1995, Donta was signed by the Baltimore Stallions. Abron was a member of the Albany Firebirds for the 1997 season. In 1998, he played for the Grand Rapids Rampage. He was moved from wide receiver/defensive back to defensive specialist next to Raphael Ball. In 1999, he did not play for the Rampage but was placed on recallable waivers.
