= Armin Franulic =

Bolivian rally driver (1943–2021)

- Born: 8 September 1943; La Paz, Republic of Bolivia
- Died: 19 June 2021 (aged 77)
- Occupation: Rally Driver

Armin Franulic (8 September 1943 – 19 June 2021) was a Bolivian rally driver.

== Biography ==
Franulic made his debut on 21 August 1976, at the age of 33, at the Gran Premio Nacional de Torino in Argentina, which he would withdraw from. He then earned second place in the event each year from 1977 to 1981. He participated in 125 competitions within Bolivia and 196 overall, in which he won 129, just two shy of the world record set by Gilbert Staepelaere.

Franulic also participated in four World Rally Championship events and the Pikes Peak International Hill Climb in 1991.

Franulic died from COVID-19 on 19 June 2021, at the age of 77.

== Awards ==
- Runner-up in the Codasur South American Rally Championship (1999)
- Champion of Bolivia (1984, 1985, 1986, 1987, 1988, 1992, 1995, 2007)
