= Anil Bordia =

Educationist, social activist

- Born: 5 May 1934; Indore, Madhya Pradesh, India
- Died: 2 September 2012 (aged 78)
- Occupations: Educationist, social activist
- Awards: Padma Bhushan; UNESCO Avicenna Gold Medal; UNESCO Fellow

Anil Bordia was an Indian educationist, social activist and former civil servant, widely respected for his contributions to the Indian education sector. The Government of India honoured him, in 2010, with Padma Bhushan, the third highest civilian award, for his services to the fields of education and literature on education.

== Early life & education ==
Mr Anil Bordia (1934–2012), as an able administrator, visionary and activist played proactive role in the formulation of a number of innovative education policies and programmes. His contribution in designing New Education Policy- 1986 and Programme of Action – 1992, National University of Education, Policy and Administration (NUEPA) Circular , and launching innovative educational programmes such as, 'Mahila Samakhya', 'Shiksha Karmi', 'Lok Jumbish' 'Doosra Dashak', etc., is quite significant.

Anil Bordia was a civil servant who was passionate about taking education to the masses and making every Indian literate. In this endeavour, he roped in academicians, activists, journalists and educationists who would otherwise have maintained a distance from "government work", wrote Rajesh Tandon in Testing the Limits of the System , He worked within the system to change it and subvert its regressive tendencies.

Anil Bordia was born on 5 May 1934 in the Indian city of Indore, in Madhya Pradesh. He had his schooling at Vidya Bhavan in Udaipur and graduated from the M. B. College, Udaipur. He secured his post graduate degree from the St. Stephen's College, and, later, qualified for the Indian Administrative Service examination in 1957.

== Personal life ==
Anil Bordia was married to Otima, a former IAS officer, and the couple had a daughter, Maitreyi and a son, Shreyas.

== Civil services career ==
Anil Bordia joined Indian Administrative Service in 1957 for a civil service career which spanned 35 years, until he retired from the service, as the Union Education Secretary in 1992. During his career, he was involved in many major educational projects and policy formulation assignments such as the Education Policy of 1986. During his public service, he launched the Bihar education project from 1977 through 1980, where he assembled many voluntary organisations, academic institutions and public resource centres to work towards achieving total literacy in the state. He was also behind the Mahila Samakhya project, a women's education project which has participation from various women's movements. In 1987, he launched the Shikha Karmi program for eradicating illiteracy from the state of Rajasthan. Under the program, society monitored schools with locally trained teachers were introduced which was reported to be successful in the universalisation of primary education in the state.

== Social activism ==
After his retirement from the government service in 1992, Anil Bordia embarked on an education program for young illiterates in Rajasthan, which he conceptualised and named, Lok Jumbish. He guided the programme until 1999; it was stated to be a highly successful initiative. In 2001, Bordia launched another movement, Doosra Dashak, which was aimed at the education and development of the youth.

He also headed a committee, Right To Education (RTE) committee, which submitted a detailed report with suggestions to synchronise the norms and strategies of the RTE with that of the Sarva Shiksha Abhiyan, a government program mandated to achieve Universalization of Elementary Education (UEE), so that operational synergies are achieved. He was also vocal about women's role in the society and girls' participation in primary education.

== Legacy ==
Anil Bordia is remembered for his contributions in rejuvenating the education sector of the country and played a part in its policy formations, especially the National Education Policy of 1986. He was an active participant in the universalisation of education in Rajasthan and Bihar. He worked for the empowerment of marginalised communities and women which he tried to achieve through society participation and community resources. He is acknowledged as an expert in micro planning and positive decision making.

== Controversy ==
Anil Bordia's name featured in an administrative litigation, when J. C. Jetli, a senior IAS officer, approached the Central Administrative Tribunal, against Bordia's appointment as a Government Secretary, superseding Jetli's claims. The case precipitated a CAT judgment asking the Central Government to lay down norms and guidelines for the appointment of cabinet secretaries.

He also had to meet with opposition during the Lok Jumbish program, when the rural people wanted full-fledged schools, rather than the system Bordia suggested, which finally led to the untimely cessation of the program in the state of Rajasthan.

== Awards and recognitions ==
Anil Bordia was awarded Padma Bhushan, in 2010, along with his teacher at the St. Stephen's College, Professor Mohammed Amin, which was celebrated by the college as a felicitation to the awardees.

- Padma Bhushan – 2010
- UNESCO Avicenna Gold Medal – 2000
- UNESCO Fellow – Asia-Pacific Centre of Educational Innovation for Development, Bangkok

The National University of Educational Planning and Administration (NUEPA) organises an annual seminar on education and social empowerment, Anil Bordia Memorial Policy Seminar, in honour of the deceased educationist.

== Death ==
Bordia died on 2 September 2012, following a cardiac arrest, at the age of 78.

== Writings ==
- Anil Bordia; J. R. Kidd; J. A. Draper (1973). Adult education in India. A book of readings. Mumbai: Nachiketa Publications. ASIN B000WH3VIY.
- G. Carron & A. Bordia (1985). Issues in planning and implementing national literacy programmes. Paris: Unesco, International Institute for Educational Planning. p. 385. ISBN 9280311182.
- Anil Bordia (1982). Training of local-level administrative personnel in national literacy programmes: Methodological report of a training workshop held at Nazareth, Ethiopia, 20–30 November 1981. Unesco, International Institute for Educational Planning. p. 72. ASIN B0007BGLU0.
- A. Bordia (1982). Planning and administration of national literacy programmes : the Indian experience. Paris: Unesco, International Institute for Educational Planning. p. 83. ASIN B0006EFWB2.
- A. Bordia, ed. (1981). Adult education for Zimbabwe (IIEP seminar paper). Paris: Unesco, International Institute for Educational Planning. p. 32. ASIN B0007C59RU.
