= Ermine (band) =

Canadian progressive rock band

- Origin: Saint John, New Brunswick, Canada
- Genre: progressive rock
- Years active: 2001–2008
- Label: Tiktoktiktok Music
- Past members: Matt Belyea; Mike Belyea; Chuck Teed; James Blanchard

Ermine was a Canadian progressive rock band composed of singer/guitarist Matt Belyea, drummer Mike Belyea and bass guitarist Chuck Teed.

== History ==
Ermine was formed in Saint John, New Brunswick, in 2001. In 2003, the band released its first album, Maps of The Rise and Fall. That year they performed at the Halifax Pop Explosion.

In 2004, Ermine moved to Halifax, and Maps of The Rise and Fall was nominated for Alternative Recording of the Year at the 2004 East Coast Music Award. Ermine has performed alongside Canadian acts Wintersleep, The Tea Party and Treble Charger, and Greg MacPherson.

The band's 2005 performance at the Halifax Pop Explosion included violinist James Blanchard. In 2006, the band released their second album, The Murra.

== Film and television ==
Ermine appeared several times on Much Music, with regular interview spots on the program Going Coastal. The band's music appeared in the short film My Name Is, which won the 2006 NSI National Exposure Amateur Movie Contest Viewers Choice Award, and was also used in Marty Smith Motocross Clinic Volume 1, which won the 2007 Xtremey Award for Best Instructional Video.

== Band members ==
Matt Belyea - guitar/vocals (2001–present)
Mike Belyea - drums/vocals (2001–present)
Chuck Teed - bass guitar/keyboards (2001–present)
James Blanchard - violin/vocals (2003–2004)

== Albums ==
2003: Maps Of The Rise and Fall (Independent)
2006: The Murra (Tiktoktiktok Music)

== Videography ==
2007: "Motel" (Directed by Megan Wennberg)
