= Anil Kumar (disambiguation) =

Anil Kumar (born 1958) is an Indian-American management consultant.

Anil Kumar may also refer to:

== In arts and media ==
- Anil Kumar (actor) (1951–2015), Indian actor, producer, theatre director, and playwright
- Anil Kumar (film director) (born 1963), director in Malayalam films, and one half of the Anil-Babu duo
- Anil V. Kumar (born 1975), television and film director and producer
- G. Anil Kumar (born 1972), journalist, columnist and writer
- S. Anil, also credited as S. Anil Kumar, director in Malayalam films

== In politics ==
- Anil Kumar (Uttar Pradesh politician) (born 1975)
- Anil Kumar (Bihar politician) (born 1960)
- Anil Kumar Eravathri, Indian politician
- Anil Kumar Jha (born 1969), Nepalese politician
- Anil Kumar Yadav (politician, born 1956), Indian
- Anil Kumar Yadav (politician, born 1960), Indian

== In sport ==
- Anil Kumar (discus thrower) (born 1975)
- Anil Kumar (footballer) (born 1986)
- Anil Kumar (judoka) (born 1984)
- Anil Kumar (wrestler, born 1979)
- Anil Kumar (wrestler, born 1971)
- Anil Kumar Prakash (born 1978), sprinter

== In other fields ==
- Anil Kumar (physicist) (born 1941)

== See also ==
- Raj Rajaratnam, Galleon Group, Anil Kumar, and Rajat Gupta insider trading cases, involving the management consultant
