= Ermin Musić =

Bosnian association football player

Personal information
- Full name: Ermin Musić
- Date of birth: 28 May 1997 (age 29)
- Place of birth: Tuzla, Bosnia and Herzegovina
- Position: Centre-back

Team information
- Current team: Drina Zvornik
- Number: 20

Youth career
- –2015: Sloboda Tuzla

Senior career*
Years	Team	Apps	(Gls)
2015	Drina Zvornik	2	(0)
2016–2017	Sloboda Tuzla	1	(0)
2017–2018	Drina Zvornik		
2018–2020	Tuzla City	4	(0)
2020	→ Zvijezda Gradačac (loan)	0	(0)
2020-	Drina Zvornik		
- * Club domestic league appearances and goals as of 27 July 2019

Ermin Musić (born 28 May 1997) is a Bosnian professional footballer who plays as a centre-back for Drina Zvornik.

== Honours ==
Sloboda Tuzla

- Bosnian Premier League runner up: 2015–16
- Bosnian Cup runner up: 2015–16
