= Vachendorf =

- Municipality
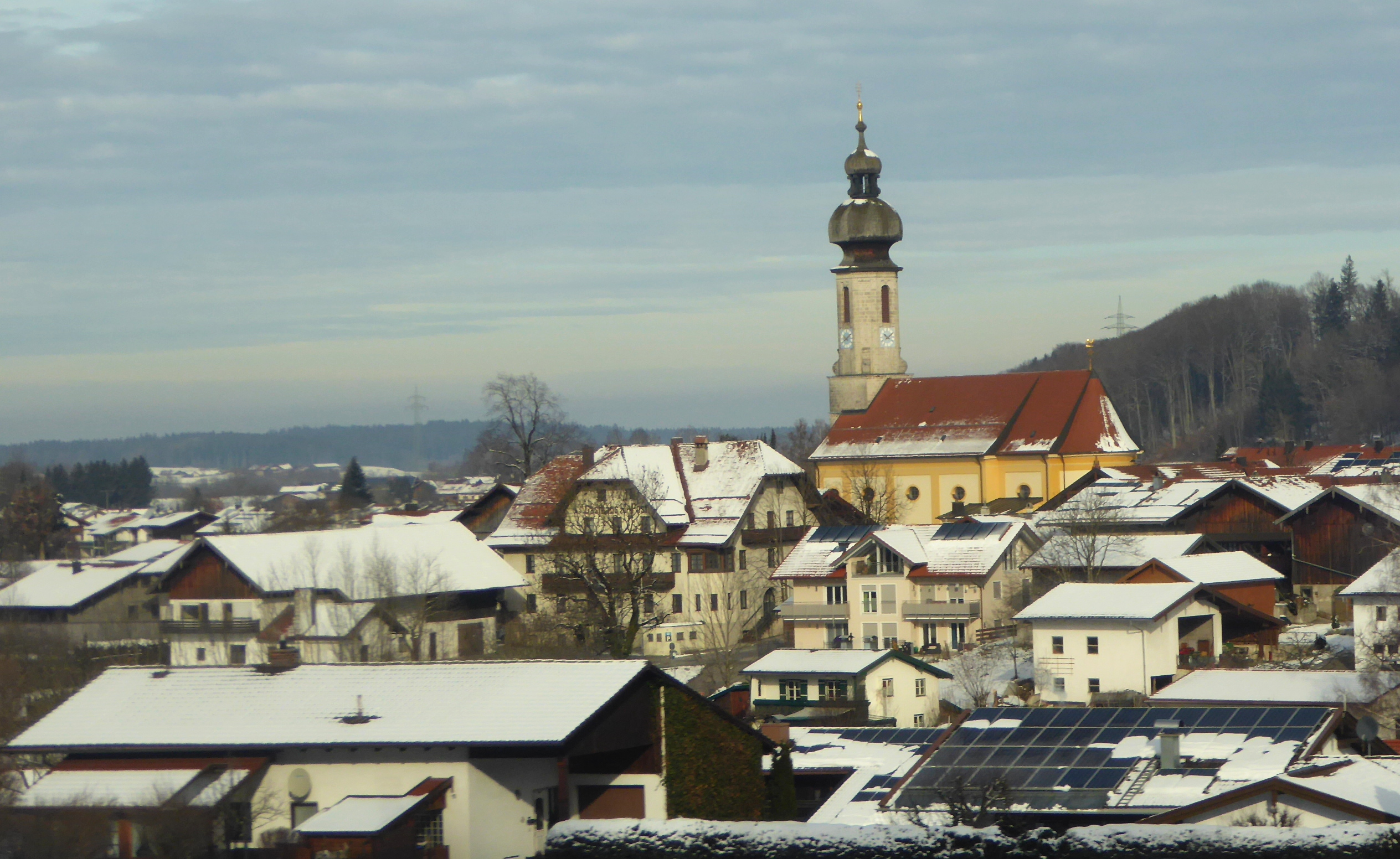
- Vachendorf with the Church of the Assumption of the Virgin Mary

- Coat of arms

- Location of Vachendorf within Traunstein district
- Interactive map of Vachendorf
- Location within Germany Location within Bavaria
- Coordinates: 47°51′N 12°37′E
- Country: Germany
- State: Bavaria
- Admin. region: Oberbayern
- District: Traunstein
- Municipal assoc.: Bergen

Government
  - Mayor (2020–26): Rainer Schroll (SPD)

Area
  - Total: 9.96 km^{2} (3.85 sq mi)
- Elevation: 581 m (1,906 ft)

Population (2025-12-31)
  - Total: 1,750
  - Density: 176/km^{2} (455/sq mi)
- Time zone: UTC+01:00 (CET)
  - Summer (DST): UTC+02:00 (CEST)
- Postal codes: 83377
- Dialling codes: 0861
- Vehicle registration: TS
- Website: www.vachendorf.de

Vachendorf (German pronunciation: [ˈfaxn̩dɔʁf]) is a municipality in the district of Traunstein in Bavaria, Germany.

== Districts ==
The municipality of Vachendorf has 17 districts.:

- Alferting
- Büchling
- Einharting
- Geiselprechting
- Hasperting
- Hiensdorf
- Humhausen
- Lug
- Mühlbach
- Mühlen
- Schlecht
- Spielwang
- Stocka
- Vachendorf
- Wimpasing
- Wipfing
- Wörglham
