= Lilia Ann Abron =

American chemical engineer (born 1945)

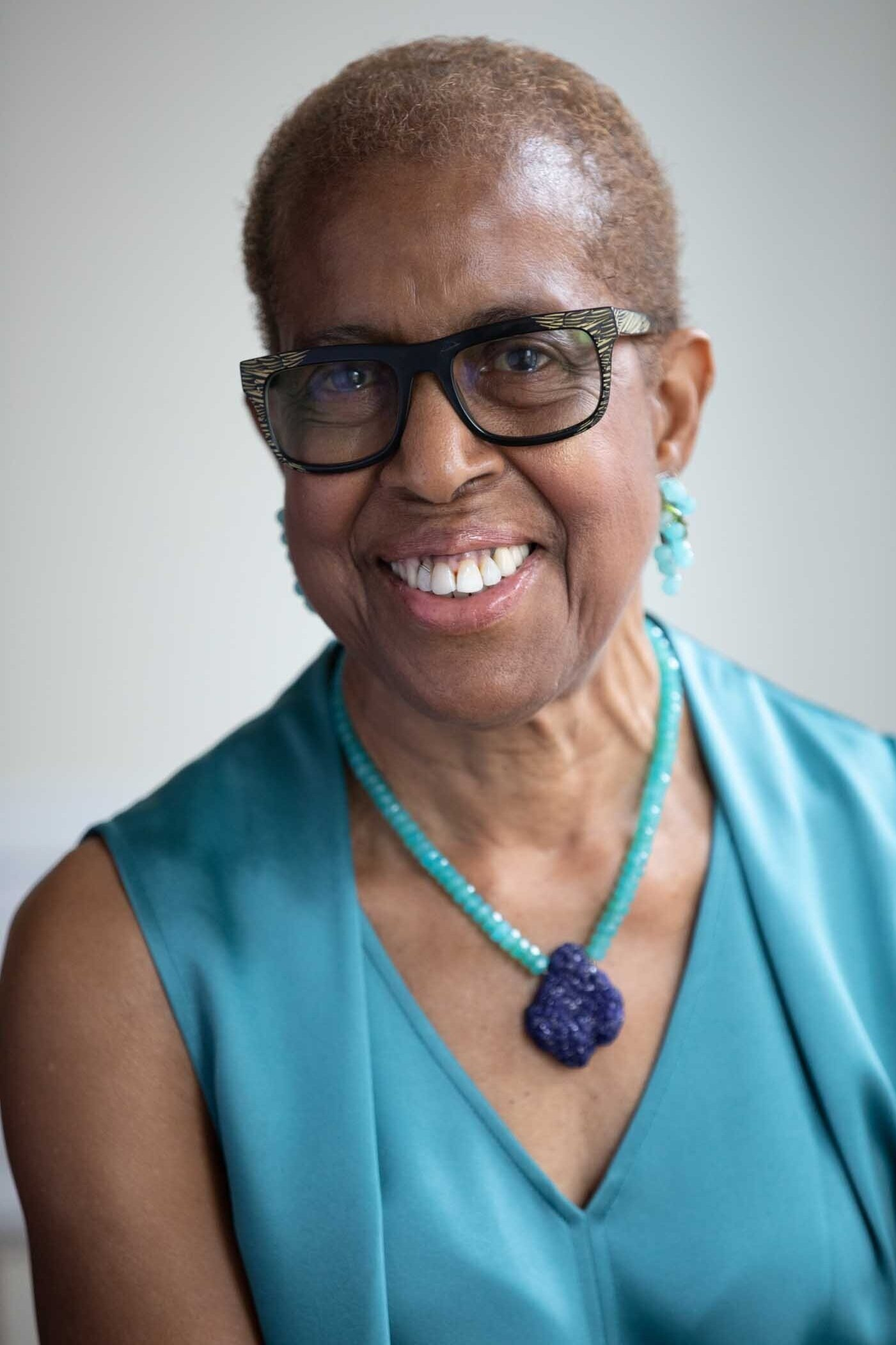
- Born: March 8, 1945 (age 81); Memphis, Tennessee, U.S.
- Education: LeMoyne–Owen College (BS); Washington University in St. Louis (MS); University of Iowa (PhD)
- Occupations: Entrepreneur; Chemical Engineer
- Years active: 1972–present
- Known for: First African American woman to be awarded a PhD in chemical engineering

Lilia Ann Abron (born March 8, 1945) is an American entrepreneur and chemical engineer. In 1972, Abron became the first African American woman to earn a PhD in chemical engineering.

== Early life ==
Abron was born in Memphis, Tennessee, was the second of four daughters. She was born prematurely, at home, and had to be rushed to the hospital by her aunt in a cab, as ambulances were not available for African Americans at the time.

Her parents were both educators who had attended LeMoyne College (now LeMoyne-Owen College). Her father, Ernest Buford Abron, had sustained an injury playing football in college, and was thus unable to serve during World War II. He worked as a Pullman porter and later was a teacher. Abron's mother, Bernice Wise Abron, was a typist from Arkansas. She typed briefs for Wiley Branton, the Little Rock Nine's defense attorney.

Abron's parents were Baptists and she was baptized at the age of nine. She participated in Girl Scouts and in the junior choir at her church.

Abron attended a public school and was placed in the school's math and science track. After graduating from Memphis High School, she decided to study medicine.

== Education ==
Abron studied at LeMoyne-Owen College. She was granted a scholarship, which she lost after her freshman year because her grades were not high enough. She switched from a biology major to a chemistry major. In 1966, Abron earned a B.S. in chemistry from LeMoyne-Owen College, with distinction.

Abron's advisor at LeMoyne-Owen, Dr. Bueler, suggested that she study engineering. She also credits Dr. Juanita Williamson, an English Professor at LeMoyne-Owen and a fellow African American, with inspiring her to pursue further education. She was offered a full-tuition scholarship from Washington University in St. Louis to study sanitary engineering, funded by the Public Health Service. Washington University was very different to anything she had experienced up to that point: it was her first time away from home, one of only two women in a large class of predominantly white males. She completed her entire degree in just thirteen months, graduating in 1968 with an MS in Environmental Engineering. During her time at Washington University, Abron developed the goal of working in academia and gained experience by working in her professors' labs.

After graduating, Abron found it difficult to find work as an environmental engineer. She worked for a year as an environmental chemist in the Kansas City water department, then for another year as a research environmental chemist at the Metropolitan Sanitary District of Chicago.

She began her PhD in September 1968 at the University of Massachusetts Amherst's department of civil engineering, under the supervision of Dr. Rolfe Skrimbee. When he moved to the University of Iowa, she moved with him. However, Dr. Skrimbree left the University of Iowa before Abron finished her research, so she completed her degree in chemical engineering in 1972, under the supervision of James O. Osburn. She was the first African American woman to be awarded a Ph.D. in chemical engineering, and only the third woman to receive a doctorate in chemical engineering from the University of Iowa. Her thesis focused on reverse osmosis, and was titled: "Transport Mechanism in Hollow Nylon Fiber Reverse Osmosis Membranes for the Removal of DDT and Aldrin from Water".

== Career ==
Dr Abron was assistant professor of civil engineering at Tennessee State University from 1971. She was also an assistant professor of environmental engineering Vanderbilt University from 1973. In 1975, she moved to Howard University as assistant professor of civil and environmental engineering, simultaneously working at Washington Technical Institute (now part of the University of the District of Columbia).

Dr Abron is a registered professional engineer, and a member of the Water Environmental Federation, the American Society of Civil Engineers, the American Water Works Association, the Society of Sigma Xi, and the American Association of University Women. She also serves on the Engineering Advisory Board for the National Sciences Foundation.

In 2004, she was elected fellow of the American Academy of Arts and Sciences. She was elected to the National Academy of Engineering in 2020, for "leadership in providing technology-driven sustainable housing and environmental engineering solutions in the United States and South Africa". She was inducted into Tau Beta Pi, DC Alpha chapter as an Eminent Engineer, and she is a History Maker.

Dr Abron gave a TED talk in her hometown of Memphis, Tennessee, on Organizing to Break the Cycle of Energy Poverty in Memphis.

Dr Abron was reinduced into the National Academy of Engineering (NAE) in 2020. She has been bestowed the highest honor – Distinguished Member, Class of 2021 – of the American Society of Civil Engineers (ASCE). As of January 2021, she became president of the American Academy of Environmental Engineers and Scientists (AAEES). She was inducted into the college of fellow of the American Institute for Medical and Biological Engineering (AIMBE) in March 2024.

=== PEER Consultants, P.C. ===
In 1978, Abron founded and became president and CEO of PEER Consultants, P.C. She was the first African-American to start an engineering consulting firm focused on environmental issues and concerns relating to the physical and human environments. PEER offers engineering and construction management services, environmental management and sustainability services, and advisory/consulting services.

With this consulting firm, Abron succeeded in proving that by enacting sustainable practices in poverty-stricken parts of the world, living conditions there can drastically improve. In 1995, Abron co-founded PEER Africa Pty. (Ltd.), with the mission of building energy-efficient homes in post-apartheid South Africa. Abron was presented with a United Nations award for her work in developing low-cost energy-efficient housing. The company carried out projects all over Africa, including in South Africa, Mali, Uganda and Nigeria.

PEER has undertaken extensive Water, Sanitation and Hygiene (WASH) initiatives in collaboration with Black Belt Unincorporated Wastewater Program (BBUWP), an organization set up to tackle unequal access to sanitation in rural Alabama.

== Personal life ==
Abron is a member of Delta Sigma Theta sorority. She gives talks and presentations related to energy and the environment. She is particularly active in promoting science education, and through her company, offers financial support to science fair participants. PEER staff are encouraged to work with students in their neighborhood schools, and Abron herself mentor's students.

She cites the book Silent Spring by Rachel Carson as an inspiration for entering the environmental movement.

Abron is a Christian who began her three-year term serving as deacon at The First Baptist Church of the City of Washington, D.C. on June 17, 2018. She previously served as president of the Washington, D.C., chapter of Jack and Jill for America. She also plays the hand bells in the Angelus church choir.

Abron has three sons and six grandchildren, only one of which is a granddaughter.

== Honors ==
- William W. Grimes Award for Excellence in Chemical Engineering from the American Institute of Chemical Engineers, 1993
- Admission to the Engineering Distinguished Alumni Academy at the University of Iowa, 1996
- Hancher-Finkbine Alumni Medallion from the Finkbine Society of the University of Iowa, awarded for learning, leadership and loyalty to the university, 1999
- Induction into the National Black College Alumni Hall of Fame, 1999
- Magic Hands Award by LeMoyne-Owen College, May 2001
- Alumni Achievement Award, Washington University School of Engineering and Applied Science, 2001
- American Academy of Arts and Sciences, 2004
- Superior Achievement from American Academy of Environmental Engineers & Scientists, 2012
