= Anıl (given name) =

Anıl is a masculine given name of Turkish origin. The name means “may you be remembered” in Turkish. Notable people with the name include:

== Given name ==
- Anıl Aydın (born 2000), German-Turkish footballer
- Anıl Demir (born 1996), Turkish footballer
- Anıl Dilaver (born 1990), Turkish footballer
- Anıl Karaer (born 1988), Turkish footballer
- Anıl Kılıçsallayan, Turkish freestyle wrestler
- Anıl Koç (born 1995), Turkish-Belgian footballer
- Anıl Piyancı (born 1990), Turkish rapper, singer, and songwriter
- Anıl Taşdemir (born 1988), Turkish footballer
- Anıl Yüksel (born 1990), Dutch-Turkish tennis player

== See also ==
- Anil (disambiguation)
