= Armin-Paul Hampel =

German politician

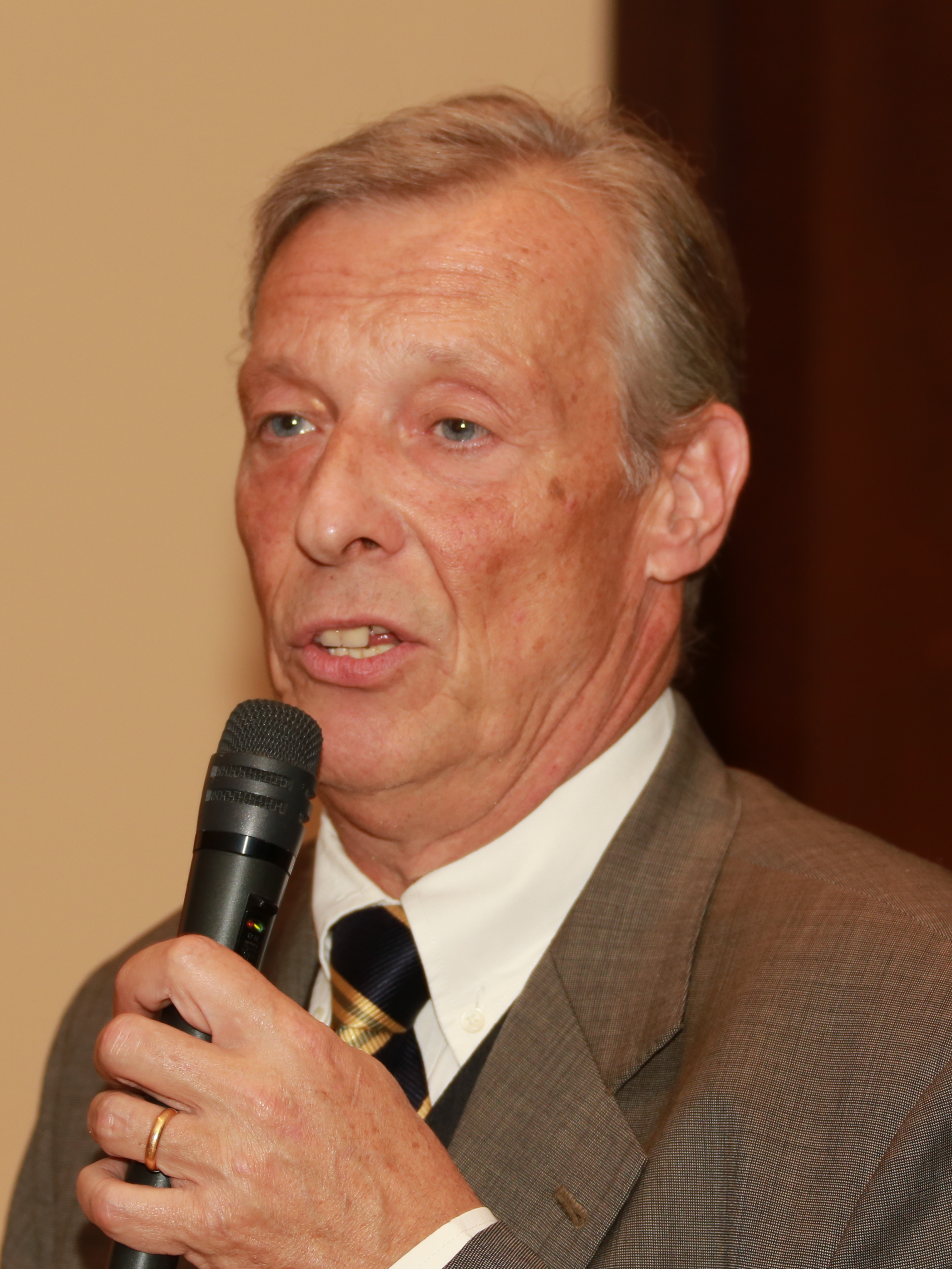
- Armin-Paul Hampel (2014)

Member of the Bundestag
- Incumbent
- Assumed office 24 October 2017

Personal details
- Born: 23 July 1957 (age 68)
- Party: AfD

Armin-Paul Hampel (born 23 July 1957) is a German politician for the populist Alternative for Germany (AfD) and from 2017 - 2021 member of the Bundestag.

== Life and achievements ==
Hampel was born 1957 in the then-West German city of Bielefeld and became a freelancer journalist. In his career he worked mostly for public broadcasting stations, Mitteldeutscher Rundfunk (Central German Broadcasting) and later ARD.

Hampel entered the newly founded AfD in 2013 and was chairman of the Landesverband (federal state association) of the party in Lower Saxony from 2013 to 2017.

In 2017 a criminal investigation alleging fraud and tax evasion was conducted against Hampel; the lawsuit was abandoned without further action.

At the German federal election in September 2017, AfD — which was previously unrepresented in the Bundestag — became the third party in the Bundestag with 12.6% of the vote. The AfD got 94 of the 709 Bundestag seats; Hampel has one of them.
