= Arnel =

- Gender: Male

Other gender
- Feminine: Arnela

Other names
- Variant form: Anel

Arnel is both a given name and a surname. The name is popular among Filipinos and Bosniaks.

In the Balkans, Arnel is popular among the Bosniaks in the former countries of Yugoslavia. The name is a modification of Anel, and it holds the same meanings: righteous ruler, just emperor, and to be remembered forever. There is also a female version of the name: Arnela (for example, Arnela Odžaković).

Notable people with the name include:

== Given name ==
- Arnel Amita (born 1995), Filipino footballer
- Arnel Cerafica (born 1965), Filipino politician
- Arnel Dedić (born 1976), Bosnian basketball coach
- Arnel Jakupović (born 1998), Austrian footballer of Bosnian descent
- Arnel Mandal (born 1995), Filipino wushu athlete
- Arnel Pineda (born 1967), Filipino singer and songwriter

== See also ==
- Brent Arnel (born 1979), New Zealand cricketer
- Arnel Bluffs, rock outcrops in Antarctica
