= Armin Smajić =

Bosnian footballer and manager

Personal information
- Full name: Armin Smajić
- Date of birth: 10 June 1964 (age 62)
- Place of birth: Sarajevo, SFR Yugoslavia
- Position: Midfielder

Senior career*
Years	Team	Apps	(Gls)
1985–1986	Željezničar Sarajevo	11	(2)
1987–1989	OFK Kikinda	57	(19)
1989–1992	Clermont Foot		
1992–1993	OFK Kikinda	20	(3)
1993–1995	VfR Bürstadt		
1995–1996	SG 01 Hoechst		
1997–1999	Wormatia Worms	53	(10)
1999–2000	Eintracht Bad Kreuznach		
2000–2001	SV Südwest Ludwigshafen		
2006	FC Schönmattenwag		

Managerial career
- 2006: FC Schönmattenwag
- 2007–2008: SG Bobenheim-Roxheim
- 2008: Eintracht Lambsheim
- 2010–2011: ATSV Wattenheim
- 2012–2013: 1.FC Niedernhausen
- 2014: TBVfL Neustadt-Wildenheid
- 2014: FSG Bensheim
- * Club domestic league appearances and goals

Armin Smajić (born 15 October 1999) is a Bosnian football manager and former player.

== Playing career ==
=== Club ===
Born in Sarajevo, SR Bosnia and Herzegovina, back then within Yugoslavia, he played with FK Željezničar Sarajevo in the 1985–86 Yugoslav First League. Then he played with OFK Kikinda in the Yugoslav Second League. Between 1989 and 1992 he played in France with Clermont Foot. Then he returned to Serbian side OFK Kikinda and played with them in the 1992–93 First League of FR Yugoslavia. Then in 1993 he moved with Germany where he will play the rest of his career, chronologically, VfR Bürstadt, SG 01 Hoechst, Wormatia Worms, Eintracht Bad Kreuznach, SV Südwest Ludwigshafen and FC Schönmattenwag.

== Managerial career ==
In 2006, he became player-manager of FC Schönmattenwag, and afterwards he dedicated himself exclusively to coaching, having managed a number of German clubs since then, namely, SG Bobenheim-Roxheim, Eintracht Lambsheim, ATSV Wattenheim, 1.FC Niedernhausen, TBVfL Neustadt-Wildenheid and FSG Bensheim.
