= Anil Agarwal =

Anil Agarwal may refer to:

- Anil Agarwal (industrialist) (born 1953/4), Indian businessman
- Anil Agarwal (environmentalist) (1947–2002), Indian environmentalist
- Anil Agrawal (born 1962), Indian politician
