= Annealing =

Annealing may refer to:

- Annealing (biology), in genetics
- Annealing (glass), heating a piece of glass to remove stress
- Annealing (materials science), a heat treatment that alters the microstructure of a material
- Quantum annealing, a method for solving combinatorial optimisation problems and ground states of glassy systems
- Simulated annealing, a numerical optimization technique
