= Armin Mašović =

Austrian footballer

Personal information
- Full name: Armin Mašović
- Date of birth: 28 June 1993 (age 33)
- Place of birth: Bruck an der Mur, Austria
- Height: 1.82 m (6 ft 0 in)
- Position: Midfielder

Team information
- Current team: Bruck/Mur

Youth career
- 1999–2006: SV Bruck/Mur
- 2006–2010: Kapfenberger SV
- 2010: Rapid Kapfenberger
- 2010–2011: Kapfenberger SV

Senior career*
Years	Team	Apps	(Gls)
2011–2013	Kapfenberger SV	7	(2)
2011–2012	→ Kapfenberger SV II	31	(3)
2013	→ Ritzing (loan)	14	(1)
2013–2014	SK Vorwärts Steyr	23	(2)
2015	FK Novi Pazar	0	(0)
2016	SVA Kindberg		
2016–2017	FC Trofaiach		
2018–	Bruck/Mur		

International career^{‡}
2012	Austria U-19	3	(0)
- * Club domestic league appearances and goals as of 15 February 2015 ‡ National team caps and goals as of 15 February 2015

Armin Mašović (born 28 June 1993) is an Austrian footballer who plays as a midfielder for FC Bruck/Mur.

== Club career ==
Born in Bruck an der Mur, Mašović played with Kapfenberger SV in the 2012–13 Austrian First League. In summer 2013 he moved to SK Vorwärts Steyr playing a year and a half with them in the Austrian Regionalliga Central. During the winter break of the 2014–15 season he left Austria for the first time and joined Serbian SuperLiga club FK Novi Pazar. By June 2019 he was playing with Bruck/Mur. His origin is from the Serbian city Novi Pazar.

== International career ==
Mašović played with the Austria U-19 in 2012.

== External sources ==
- Armin Mašović at fussballoesterreich.at
