= Armin Abron =

Periodontist

- Born: October 24, 1975 (age 50)
- Education: University of North Carolina, Chapel Hill
- Medical career
- Profession: Periodontist
- Research: Periodontology

Armin Abron (born October 24, 1975, in Frankfurt, Germany) is a periodontist, who practices in Washington, D.C. He is also an adjunct assistant professor of periodontology at UNC School of Dentistry in Chapel Hill.

Abron earned his Bachelor of Science degree (B.S.) and Doctor of Dental Surgery degree (D.D.S.) from the University of North Carolina at Chapel Hill, and his Master of Science degree (M.S.) in periodontology at Columbia University School of Dental and Oral Surgery in New York City.

He is the recipient of the Mel Morris Award for Clinical and Academic Excellence in Periodontics.

Abron has been involved in many research projects related to implants and periodontology. His work has been published in national and international journals, including the European Journal of Oral Science, Journal of Prosthetic Dentistry, and Journal of Clinical Periodontology.
