= Abron (ancient Greece) =

Ancient Greek name

Abron or Habron (Ancient Greek: Ἅβρων) was the name of a number of people in classical Greek history:

1. A son of the Attic orator Lycurgus.

2. The son of Callias, of the deme of Bate in Attica, who wrote on the festivals and sacrifices of the Greeks. He also wrote a work, περὶ παρωνύμων, which is frequently referred to by Stephanus of Byzantium (s.v. Ἀγάθη, Ἄργος, &c.) and other writers.

3. A Phrygian or Rhodian sophist and grammarian, pupil of Tryphon, and originally a slave (his parents were also slaves), who taught at Rome under the first Caesars. He was presumably the same Habron who was the author of the treatise On the Pronoun.

4. A rich person at Argos, from whom the proverb Ἅβρωνος βίος ("The life of Abron"), which was applied to extravagant persons, is said to have been derived.
