= Nepenthes armin =

Conservation status
- Least Concern (IUCN 3.1)

Scientific classification
- Kingdom: Plantae
- Clade: Embryophytes
- Clade: Tracheophytes
- Clade: Angiosperms
- Clade: Eudicots
- Order: Caryophyllales
- Family: Nepenthaceae
- Genus: Nepenthes
- Species: N. armin

Binomial name
- Nepenthes armin Jebb & Cheek (2014)

Species of pitcher plant from the Philippines

Nepenthes armin is a tropical pitcher plant native to the Sibuyan Island in the Philippines. The type specimen was collected in 1989 on Sibuyan Island, where it grows at gallery forests on ultramafic rock at the elevation of 750 metres (2,460 ft) above sea level. The specific epithet armin honours Armin Rios Marin, a former local councilor and World Wide Fund for Nature official who was murdered during a protest lead in 2007 against an attempt of forest clearing for a mining project.

== Description ==
N. armin is a terrestrial climber that grows up to 5 metres (16 ft) tall. Its leaves are thinly coriaceous with dimensions of 13.1–15 centimetres (5.2–5.9 in) by 1.8–2.6 centimetres (0.71–1.02 in), with its petiolate narrowly oblong-elliptic to narrowly elliptic-linear. N. armin only has coiled tendril upper pitchers, with general dimensions of 10.2–12.9 centimetres (0.33–0.42 ft) in height and a diameter of 1.9–2.6 centimetres (0.75–1.02 in) which are green in color with a faint purple mottling, with a narrowly cylindrical outline. Its infructescence and seeds are not identified in the original 2014 description.

N. armin was originally described as similar to N. graciliflora, with key differences include having no convex lid basal appendage, and a much shorter anthesis pedical length. Its upper pitcher is slightly constricted at the middle with its lower part equally as wide or narrower than its upper part, while N. graciliflora lacks constriction, and has its lower part wider compared to its upper part. Its male pedicels are the shortest among the Nepenthes Alata group at 3.5–4.5 mm.
