= Anil Biswas =

Anil Biswas is the name of:

- Anil Biswas (composer) (1914–2003), Indian film music composer
- Anil Biswas (politician) (1944–2006), Indian politician
