= Anil, Rio de Janeiro =

Anil
- Neighborhood
- Location in Rio de Janeiro Anil (Brazil)
- Coordinates: 22°57′16″S 43°20′24″W
- Country: Brazil
- State: Rio de Janeiro (RJ)
- Municipality/City: Rio de Janeiro
- Zone: Southwest Zone

Population (2010)
  - Total: 24,172

Anil is a neighborhood in the Southwest Zone of Rio de Janeiro, Brazil.
