= Armin Stromberg =

Russian chemist (1910–2004)

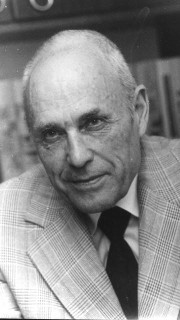
- Stromberg in 1981
- Born: 16 September 1910; Breslau, German Empire
- Died: 18 September 2004 (aged 94); Tomsk, Russia
- Education: Ural Polytechnic Institute
- Known for: Creation of large research group on electroanalysis in Tomsk
- Scientific career
- Fields: Analytical chemistry, electroanalysis
- Workplaces: Ural Branch of Russian Academy of Sciences, Ural State University, Tomsk Polytechnic University

Armin Stromberg (Russian: Арми́н Ге́нрихович Стро́мберг) was a Russian electrochemist, who is most famous of his works in classic polarography and stripping voltammetry.

Stromberg published around 470 papers, around half of them in academic journals, mainly in Russian; and a popular textbook for students called 'Physical Chemistry', also in Russian.

His scientific career started back in 1930 in Yekaterinburg Ural Branch of Russian Academy of Sciences in the laboratory of molten salts. In 1956 he moved to Tomsk Polytechnic University, where he created a large scientific research laboratory developing different aspects of the stripping voltammetry method. During 1963–2003 he supervised 103 PhD students, who successfully defended their thesis on analytical chemistry.
