= Ermin Cavcic =

Dutch footballer

Personal information
- Date of birth: 22 October 2002 (age 24)
- Place of birth: Maastricht, Netherlands
- Height: 1.81 m (5 ft 11 in)
- Position: Defender

Team information
- Current team: KVK Beringen

Youth career
- RKVVL/Polaris
- MVV

Senior career*
Years	Team	Apps	(Gls)
2020–2022	MVV	2	(0)
2023	KVK Beringen		
- * Club domestic league appearances and goals as of 12:13, 10 July 2022 (UTC)

Ermin Cavcic (born 22 October 2002) is a Dutch footballer who plays as a defender. Born in Maastricht, Cavcic is of Bosnian descent.

He co-owns football school Topkickers and took charge of the SC Jekerdal academy in 2023.

== Career statistics ==
=== Club ===
As of 9 September 2020.

Club	Season	League			Cup		Continental		Other		Total	
Club	Season	Division	Apps	Goals	Apps	Goals	Apps	Goals	Apps	Goals	Apps	Goals
MVV Maastricht	2020–21	Eerste Divisie	1	0	0	0	–		0	0	1	0
Career total			1	0	0	0	0	0	0	0	1	0
