= Armin Risi =

Swiss author

Armin Risi (born 1962 in Lucerne) is a Swiss poet, Vedas ambassador and author of esoteric and spiritual books.

== Life ==
In 1988 Risi published his first independent publication, the brochure „Vegetarisch leben – Die Notwendigkeit fleischloser Ernährung“ ("Living Vegetarian - The Necessity of Meatless Diets"). In 1992 he published his first own book. From 1995 Risi published numerous articles in fringe scientific and esoteric journals and gave lectures.

In 2005, he made a study trip to Egypt. On this trip he gained access to what he calls the "Osiris Crypt" of Giza and the "Monolith Crypt" of Sakkara. Risi published the book Die Giza Mauer (The Giza Wall) in 2005, together with Rico Paganini. The book was the subject of criticism, whereupon Risi made a statement after he initially defended his book against criticism. Later, he partially distanced himself from the findings of his co-author Rico Paganini.

Armin Risi has lived as a freelance writer and speaker since 1998. In 2005 he founded the „Institut für die Wissenschaft der Involution“ ("Institute for the Science of Involution").

In the brochure Rechtsradikalismus in der Esoterik published by Sektenwatch, Rainer Fromm accuses Risi of spreading anti-Semitically charged ideas under an esoteric guise, referring in particular to Risi's work Machtwechsel auf der Erde. Fromm mentions having received a letter from Risi personally in response to his criticism, in which Risi states: „In der überarbeiteten Neuauflage von 2006 habe ich das diesbezügliche Kapitel vollständig gestrichen, um mich nicht nur kritisch, sondern gänzlich von diesem Thema zu distanzieren“ ("In the revised new edition of 2006, I have completely deleted the chapter on this subject, in order to distance myself not only critically, but entirely from this topic").

In October 2014, the newspaper Münchner Merkur reported on a conference of "conspiracy theorists" and "fringe scientists," at which Risi was one of the speakers, under the headline „Ein unheimliches Treiben im Zwielicht zwischen Unfug und Welterlösung“. Münchner Merkur described Risi as a "master at playing with ignorance."

Risi is also known for questioning the evolution theory.

== Works ==
As author:

- Machtwechsel auf der Erde. Die Pläne der Mächtigen, globale Entscheidungen und die Wendezeit. Heyne-Verlag, 2007
- Völkerwanderung – Epische Galerie. Govinda-Verlag 1992
- Der Kampf mit dem Wertlosen – Lyrische Meditationen. Govinda-Verlag 1992
- Da ich ein Dichter war – Reinkarnation: Gedanken, Gedichte und eine Begegnung mit Hölderlin. Govinda-Verlag 1995
- Der multidimensionale Kosmos, Band 1: Gott und die Götter. Govinda-Verlag 1995
- Der multidimensionale Kosmos, Band 2: Unsichtbare Welten. Govinda-Verlag 1998
- Der multidimensionale Kosmos, Band 3: Machtwechsel auf der Erde. Govinda-Verlag 1999
- TranscEnding the Global Power Game – Hidden Agendas, Divine Intervention and the New Earth. Govinda Press 2004 (Zusammenfassung und Erweiterung von 'Machtwechsel auf der Erde' in englischer Sprache)
- Licht wirft keinen Schatten – Ein spirituell-philosophisches Handbuch. Govinda-Verlag 2004
- Der radikale Mittelweg – Überwindung von Atheismus und Monotheismus. Kopp-Verlag 2009
- Ganzheitliche Spiritualität . Govinda-Verlag 2011
- Einheit im Licht der Ganzheit . Govinda-Verlag 2011
- „Ihr seid Lichtwesen“ – Ursprung und Geschichte des Menschen. Govinda-Verlag 2013
- „Evolution“ – Stammt der Mensch von den Tieren ab?. Govinda-Verlag 2014

As co-author:

- Die Kanada-Auswanderung – Zeitreise ins Kali-yuga. Roman von Werner E. Risi, Govinda-Verlag 1996
- Mutter Erde wehrt sich – Über die Heilung des Planeten und die Aufgabe der Sterngeborenen. medial texts vy Tom H. Smith and Savitri Braeucker, translated by Tom H. Smith and expanded introduction by Armin Risi, Govinda-Verlag 1997
- Das kosmische Erbe – Einweihung in die Geheimnisse unserer Her- und Zukunft. Medial texts by Tom H. Smith, translated and explained by Armin Risi, Govinda-Verlag 2001
- Die Giza-Mauer und der Kampf um das Vermächtnis der alten Hochkulturen – Geheime Forschungen im Pyramiden-Gelände. By Armin Risi and Rico Paganini, Govinda-Verlag 2005
- Vegetarisch leben – Vorteile einer fleischlosen Ernährung. Armin Risi und Ronald Zürrer, 6., completely revised and expanded edition, Govinda-Verlag 2006
- MAKE THAT CHANGE – Michael Jackson: Botschaft und Schicksal eines spirituellen Revolutionärs, Sophia Pade and Armin Risi, Govinda-Verlag 2017

== Speaker at congresses ==
- Dialog mit dem Universum, Düsseldorf 1995 and 1999
- UFO-Kongress, Zurich 1996, 1997 and 1998
- 1. Weltkongress Verbotene Archäologie, Berlin 1998
- Lebenskraft – Kongress für Bewusstsein, Gesundheit und Lebenshilfe, Zurich 2003, 2004 and 2005
- Kongress für Grenzwissenschaften, Regen 2004
- Die Macht hinter der Macht, Stuttgart 2005, Forum Kontrovers
- Die Wissenschaft der Involution – Menschheitsgeschichte jenseits von Darwinismus und Kreationismus, Stuttgart 2006, Neue-Impulse-Treff
- Kosmische Mysterien, November 2018, Königstein am Taunus, Kongress "Medizin und Bewusstsein"
