= Armin Andreas Pangerl =

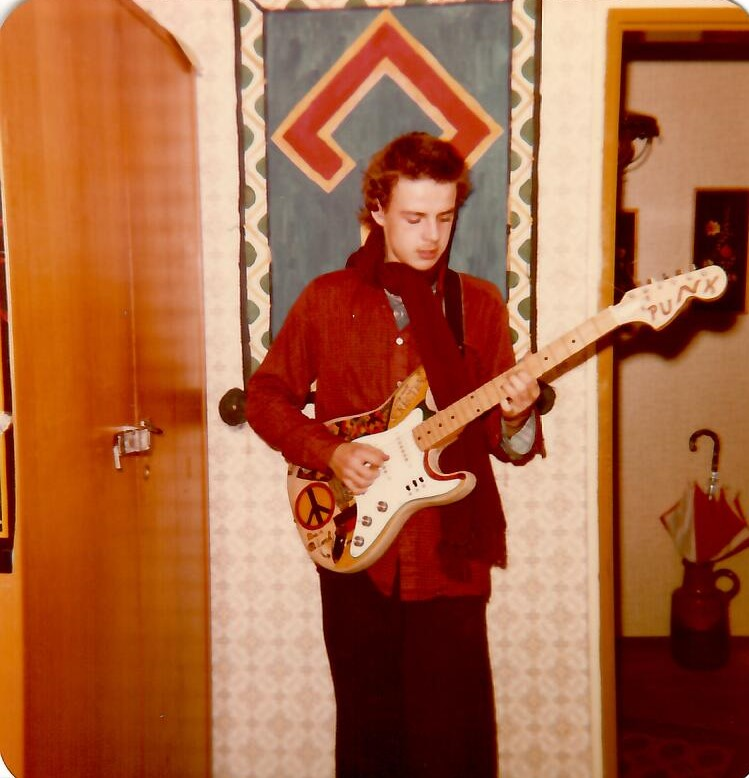
- Armin Andreas Pangerl (1982)

Background information
- Born: Armin Andreas Pangerl; 13 May 1965 (age 61)
- Origin: Germany
- Genre: Punk rock; Art Brut
- Occupations: Musician, author, artist
- Instruments: Vocal, guitar
- Years active: 1983–present
- Website: arminpangerl.com

Armin Andreas Pangerl (born 13 May 1965 in Bayreuth) is a German painter, author and exhibition maker.

== Life ==
Pangerl was born 1965 as Son of police officer Anton Pangerl and his wife Monika. He has three brothers and grew up in Bayreuth, Lörrach und Lahr/Schwarzwald.

He lives and works in Lahr.

== Style and works ==
Armin Andreas Pangerl has been primarily self-taught in abstract painting since he was a child. In addition, since a stay in psychiatry, he has been painting conceptually and in the outsider art manner. Series and series of images are often created that are thematically the same. However, he rejects repetitions in his motifs except for the "one million project". So far, around 400,000 crosses (ink brushes) have been painted on 53 pictures. In addition to this main work, around 800 works on paper were created.

In addition, his sketches and drawings form a controversial universe of thoughts and transitions in the image formulations. The absurd has the same priority as the banal. Text passages and fragments of thought are often built into the form of associations to the painted that reflect the present. Another engine is music. Pangerl taught himself to play the guitar and piano at the age of 13, and there was an early ability to create his own compositions.

In 2017, some of his works were included in the Prinzhorn Collection in Heidelberg. His texts are written in the first person perspective and convey an impression of the current inner state of mind.

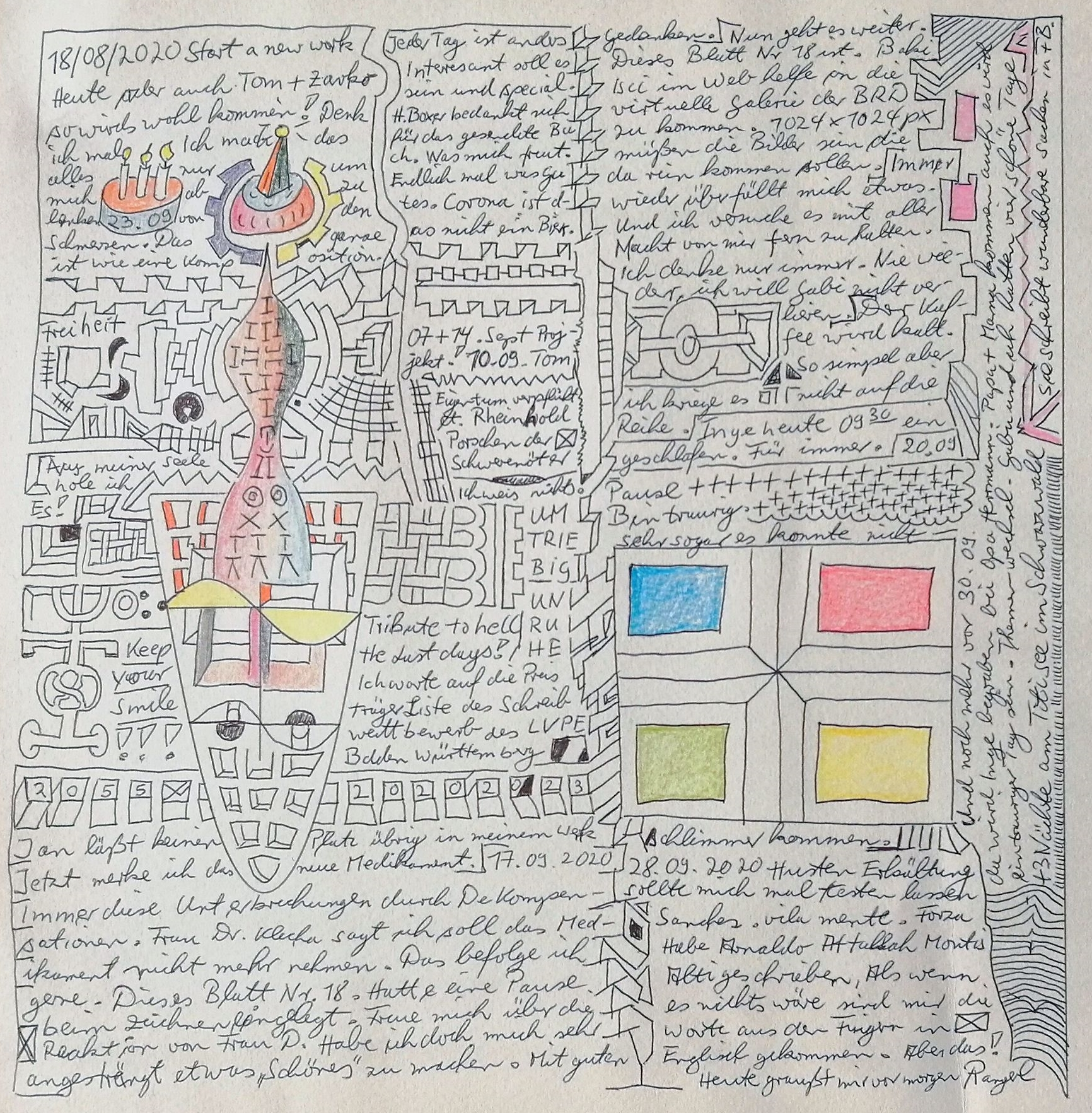
Nr 18 vergeben an OaM, 2020

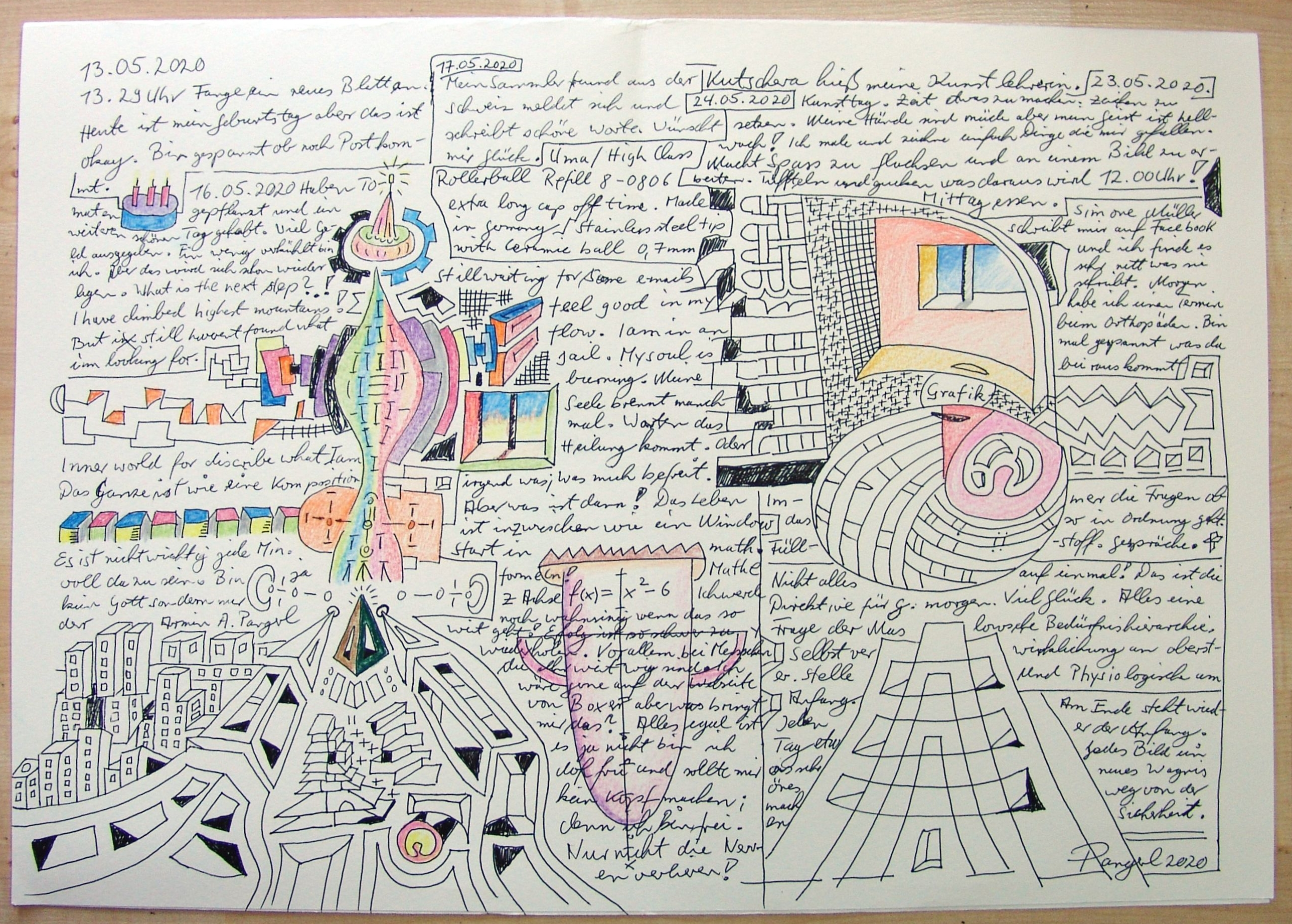
Number 5, 2020

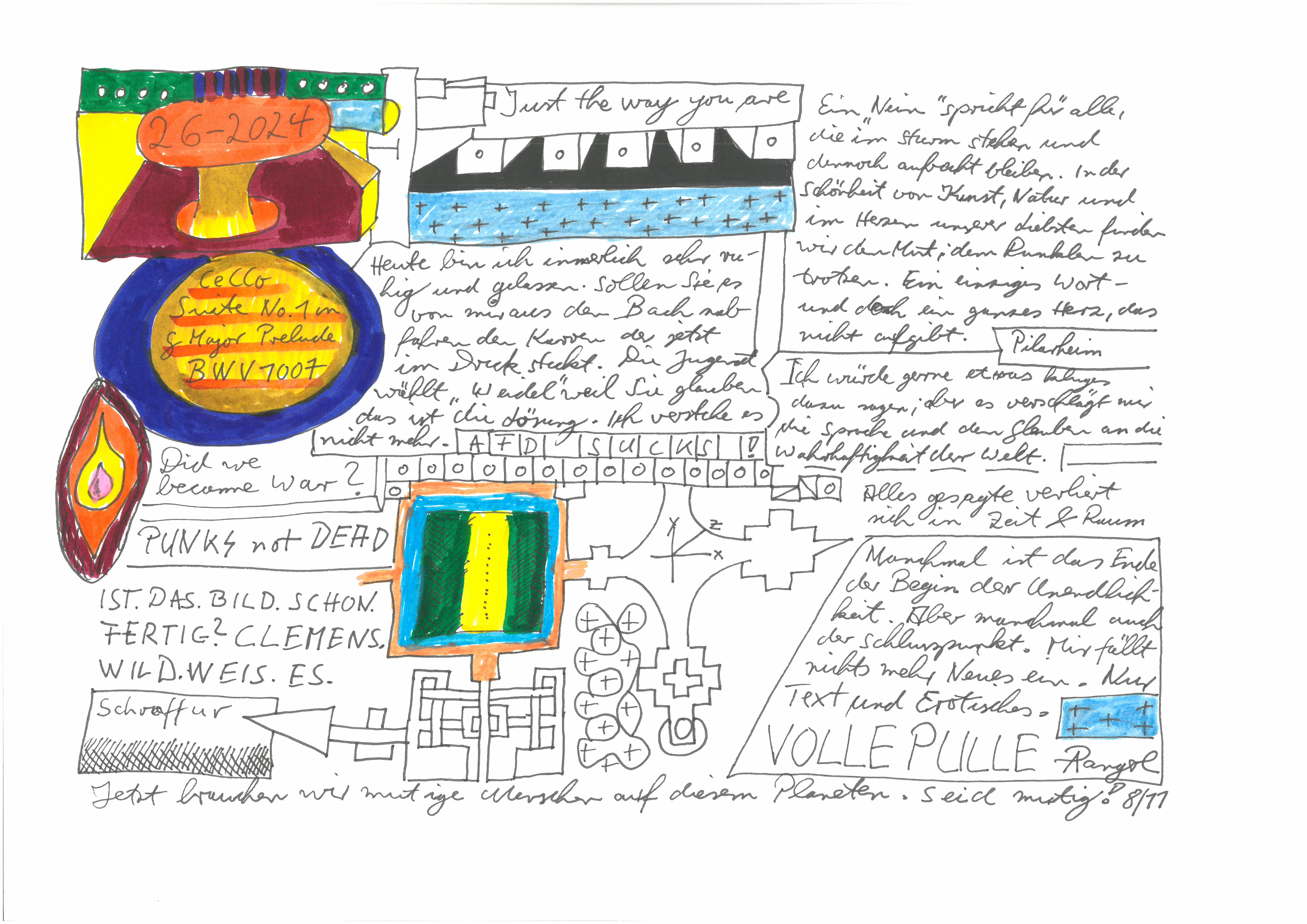
26-2024, 2024

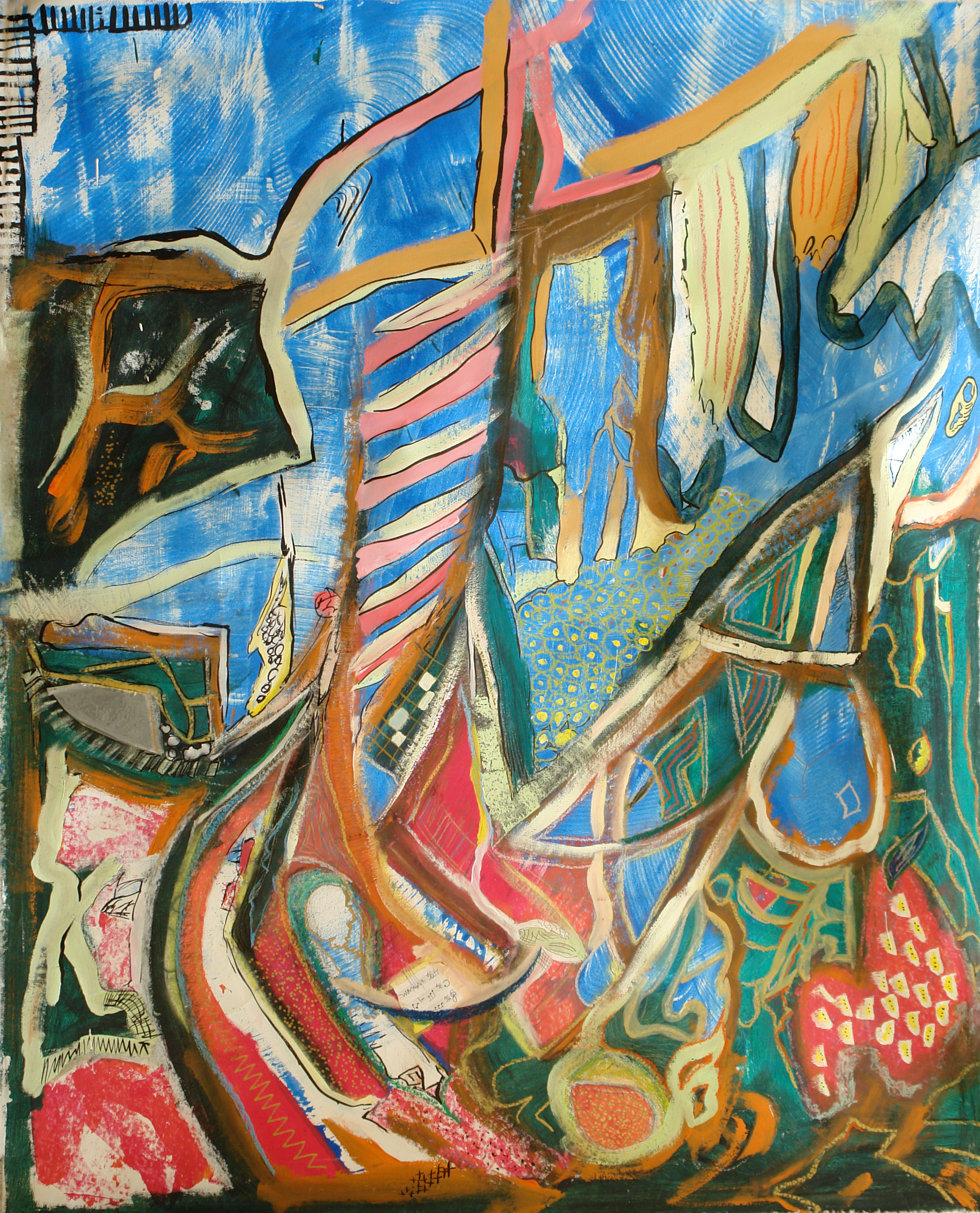
Dschungel

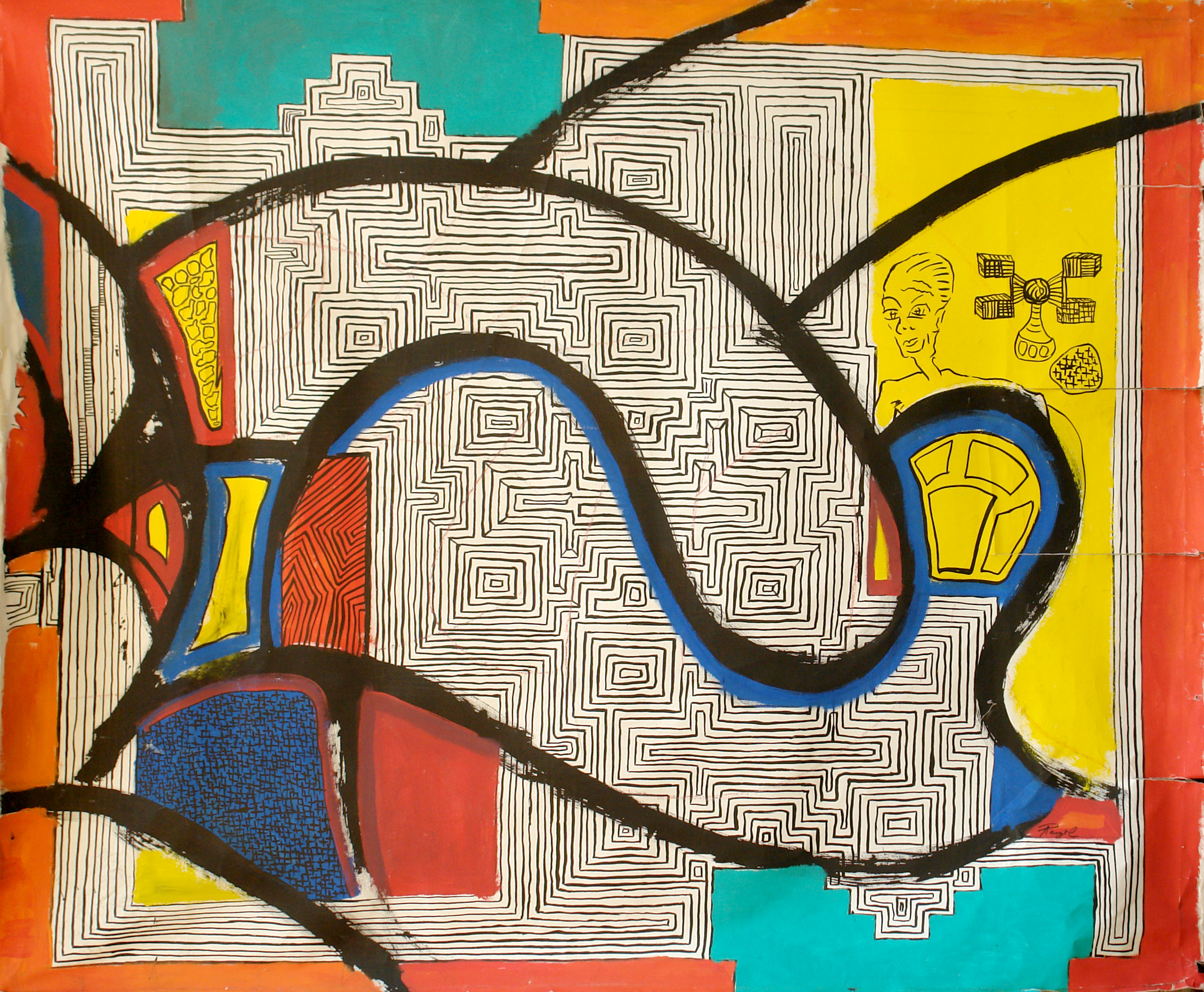
Klapsmühle

== Exhibitions (selection) ==
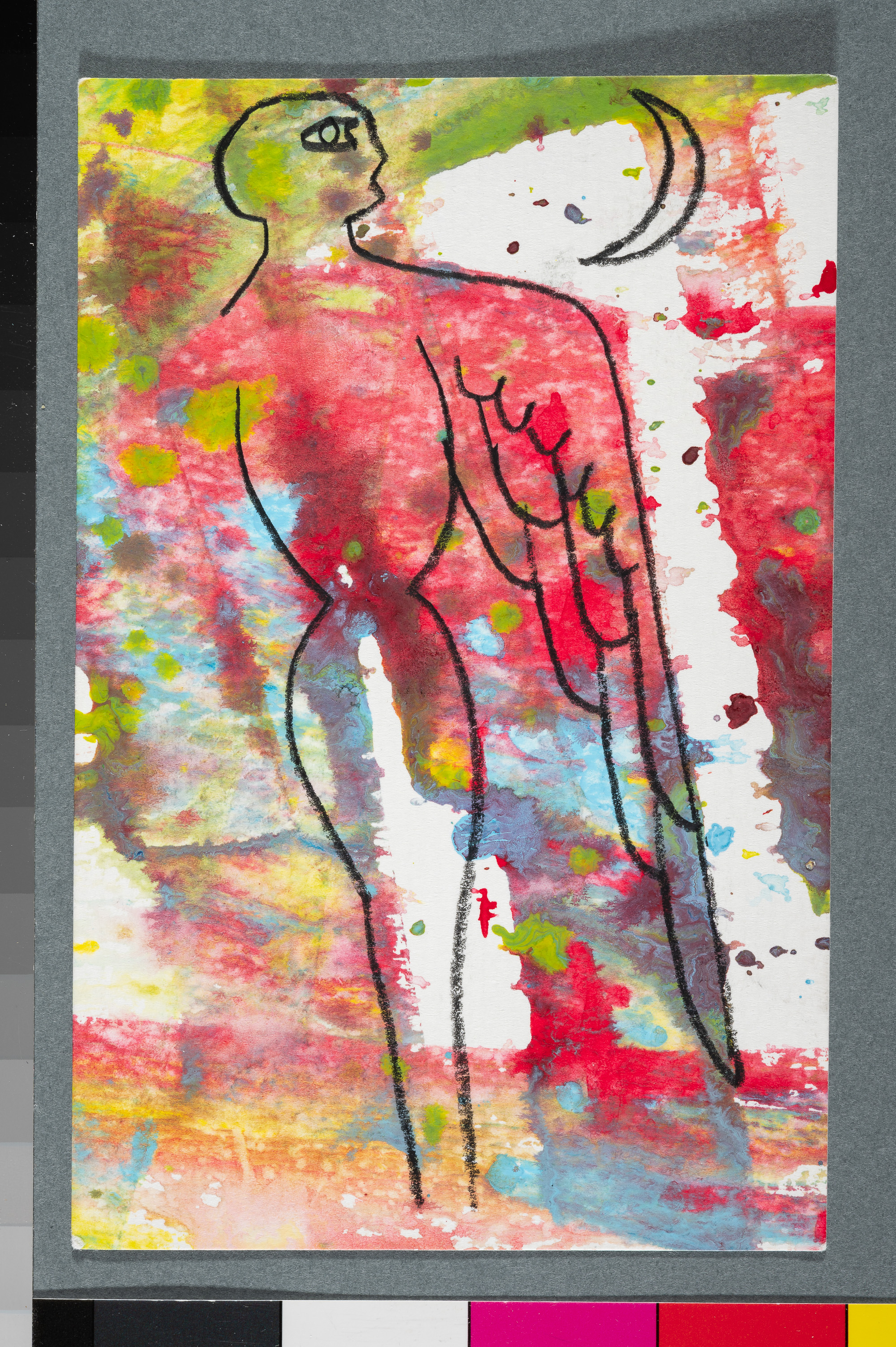
Engel, 2005

- 1992: Gruppenausstellung Offenburg Spitalspeicher
- 1999: Solo Exhibition Landratsamt Lahr (PB)
- 2000: Group Exhibition Medienhaus Lahr
- 2000: Solo Exhibition im Dienstzimmer des Oberbürgermeisters von Lahr
- 2004: Solo Exhibition: one million& verortung, Kunsthalle Altdorf
- 2004: Solo Exhibition: "Flurgestaltung" Kreishaus Lahr
- 2007: Ausstellung im Industriemuseum Oberhausen (Zinkfabrik Altenberg) aus Anlass des Dienstleistungswettbewerbs des Wirtschaftsministerium NRW
- 2011/2012: „Grenzgänger“ Lahr, Florenz, Freiburg, Zürich, Berlin. Museum für Kommunikation Berlin, Charity Summit 12 Berlin
- 2017: Aufnahme in die Sammlung Freundeskreis Willy-Brandt-Haus Berlin
- 2018: Textbeitrag zum Kunstpreis "so gesehen"
- 2019: Aufnahme in Museum im Lagerhaus St. Gallen Schweiz
- 2019: Aufnahme eines weiteren Werkes in die Sammlung Prinzhorn, Heidelberg
- 2020: Aufnahme in die Galerie Henry Boxer (Richmond)
- 2020: Aufnahme in die Galerie Henry Boxer (Richmond)
- 2020: Collection Peter Bolliger (Zürich)
- 2020: Collection Peter Bolliger (Zürich)
- 2021: Collection Turhan Demirel (Wuppertal)
- 2021: Collection Eckhard Busch (Köln)
- 2022: Collection Dominique Peloux-Raynal (Frankreich)
- 2022: Solo Exhibition im Dienstzimmer des Oberbürgermeisters von Lahr
- 2023 open art museum (St. Gallen/CH)
- 2025 Wer bin Ich? Bilder der Identitätssuche, Sammlung Prinzhorn
- Banner im Kreisverkehr Lahr /Mai bis September, B3 Ecke Schwarzwaldstr. Lahr
- 5. Teilnahme an dem Kunstpreis "Ermutigung" in Fürstenwald (Brandenburg)
- und der dortigen Wanderausstellung in Diensdorf- Radlow und Coscznow- Polen
- Wanderausstellung "So gesehen" in verschiedenen Orten in Baden-Württemberg
- Haus der Katholischen Kirche, Mannheim und viele mehr.
- 2026: Art Brut Biennale in Hengelo, Netherlands

== Publications ==
- Armin Andreas Pangerl (2000), "Auf dem Weg zu mir", Der Eppendorfer (in German)
- Armin Andreas Pangerl (2003), "Auf dem Weg zu mir", in Sibylle Prins [in German] (ed.), Vom Glück: Wege aus psychischen Krisen (in German), Bonn: Psychiatrie-Verlag, pp. 121 ff.(156 pages), ISBN 3-88414-347-6
- Armin Andreas Pangerl (2009), "»Outsider Art Markt« in der Sammlung Prinzhorn", Brückenschlag: Zeitschrift für Sozialpsychiatrie, Literatur, Kunst (in German), vol. 25, Neumünster: Paranus Verlag, p. 181(232 pages), ISBN 978-3-940636-03-4
- Armin Pangerl (2018), Bilder Buch: Arbeiten auf Papier (in German), Berlin: epubli, (74 pages), ISBN 978-3-7467-0495-1
- Armin Pangerl (2018), Tagebuchblätter 2013–2018: Ein Erfahrungsbericht (in German) (1 ed.), Berlin: epubli, (228 pages), ISBN 978-3-7467-0283-4
- Armin Pangerl (2018), Ungebrochen: Straßentagebücher (in German) (1 ed.), Berlin: epubli, (40 pages), ISBN 978-3-7467-9679-6
- Armin Pangerl (2018), Erotic Art: Die etwas andere Art von Erotic (in German) (1 ed.), Berlin: epubli, (27 pages), ISBN 978-3-7467-9750-2
- Armin Pangerl (2018), Tagebuchblätter 2013–2018: Ein Erfahrungsbericht (in German) (1 ed.), Berlin: epubli, (27 pages), ISBN 978-3-7467-9733-5
- Armin Pangerl (2018), Ungebrochen: Straßentagebücher (in German) (1 ed.), Berlin: epubli, ISBN 978-3-746797-26-7
- Armin Pangerl (2018), Bilderbuch 2005 (in German) (1 ed.), Berlin: epubli, (74 pages), ISBN 978-3-746798-04-2
- Armin Pangerl (2018), Bilder von Armin Pangerl: Eine Auswahl (in German) (1 ed.), Berlin: epubli, (24 pages), ISBN 978-3-746798-02-8
- Armin Pangerl (2018), Gedanken los lassen (in German) (1 ed.), Berlin: epubli, ISBN 978-3-746799-90-2
- Armin Pangerl (2018), Gedanken los lassen (in German) (1 ed.), Berlin: epubli, (96 pages), ISBN 978-3-748500-02-5
- Armin Pangerl (2018), Wunderworldzone 52 Postkarten (in German) (1 ed.), Berlin: epubli, (54 pages), ISBN 978-3-7485-0263-0
- Armin Pangerl (2019), Elena Demke/Mirko Ološtiak-Brahms (ed.), Psychose als Selbstfindung Bald 100 Stimmen zu Dorothea Bucks 100. Geburtstag. Eine Fest- und Feierschrift. (in German) (1 ed.), Berlin: BPE, (90 pages), ISBN 978-3-9820-7800-7
- Armin Pangerl (2019), Bilder von gestern und heute (in German) (1 ed.), Berlin: epubli, (78 pages), ISBN 978-3-7485-3496-9
- Armin Pangerl (2019), Tagebuchblätter 2018 (in German) (1 ed.), Berlin: epubli, (58 pages), ISBN 978-3-7485-35-44-7
- Armin Pangerl (2019), Tagebuchblätter 2018 (in German) (1 ed.), Berlin: epubli, (60 pages), ISBN 978-3-7485-35-47-8

=== Movies ===
- 2007: Outsider Art Markt Collection Prinzhorn, Heidelberg (https://www.youtube.com/watch?v=ch4mCqXjGko)

== Memberships ==
Armin Andreas Pangerl is a founding member and honorary member of the association "Die Brücke" (The Bridge) e.V. Aidgroup for People in mental distress. He is also a member of Art-Transmitter.de and Insiderart.de as well Saatchi Art online and the European Outsider Art Association (EOA).

== Awards and honours ==
- Nomination IBK Preis 2005 mit dem Atelier Projekt
- Honorary Membership in the Die Brücke e.V. (25 Jahre)
