= Anil Jain =

Anil Jain may refer to:

- Anil Jain (cricketer) (born 1942), Indian cricketer
- Anil Jain (Madhya Pradesh politician) (born 1972), Indian politician
- Anil Jain (Uttar Pradesh politician), Indian politician
- Anil K. Jain (electrical engineer, born 1946) (1946–1988), Indian-American electrical engineer at the University of California, Davis
- Anil K. Jain (computer scientist, born 1948), Indian-American computer scientist at Michigan State University
