= Armin Baniaz Pahamin =

Malaysian entrepreneur

Dr Armin Baniaz Pahamin

President of Gerakan Ekonomi Malaysia (GEM); Secretary-General of Sekretariat Tanahair (STAR); Former Central Executive Committee Member and Chairman of Economic Bureau, Parti Pejuang Tanahair (PEJUANG)

Personal details
- Born: March 1, 1974 (age 52) Kuala Lumpur, Malaysia
- Spouse: Anny Chunraem
- Children: 4
- Education: University of Buckingham (Bachelor of Science (Hons) in Economics - BSc in Economics); ELM Graduate School, HELP University Doctor of Business Administration (DBA)
- Occupation: Entrepreneur; Business Advisor; Political Figure
- Known for: Political and Economic Advocacy; Automotive Industry Leadership President Proton Edar Dealers Association Malaysia; Founder of CarBengkel aftermarket system solution; Chief’s Original Bootcamp Malaysia, a military-inspired group transformation fitness program
- Website: arminbaniaz.com

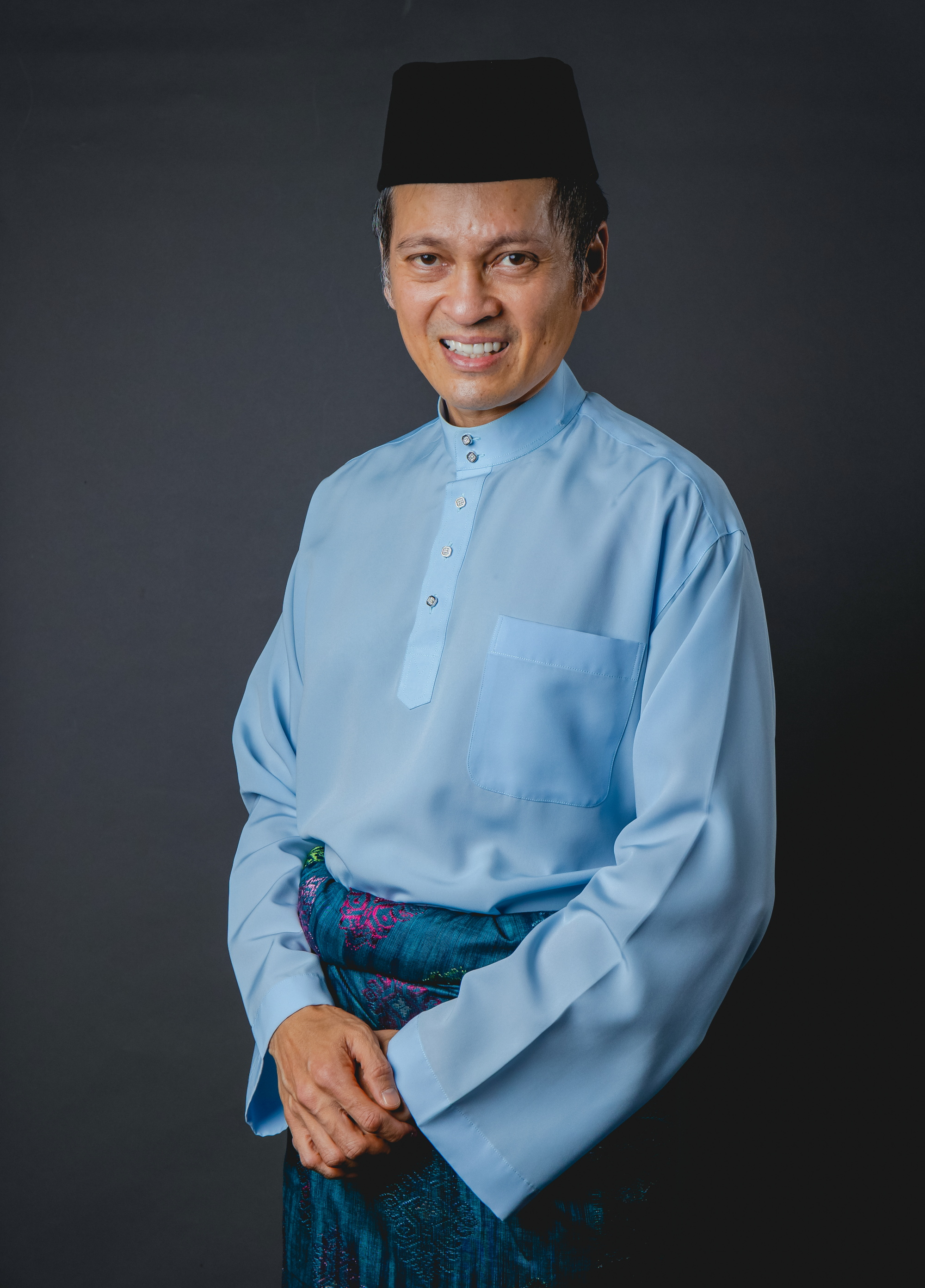
Dr Armin Baniaz Pahamin

Dr Armin Baniaz Pahamin (born 1 March 1974) is a Malaysian entrepreneur, business advisor, and political figure. He is known for his leadership in the automotive industry and his advocacy for economic empowerment and political reform. Armin currently serves as President of Gerakan Ekonomi Malaysia (GEM) and Secretary-General of Sekretariat Tanahair (STAR). He is also a prominent advocate for digital electoral reform and the development of the Malay community.

He was featured as a successful young millionaire by Malaysia Personal MONEY, the Edge financial magazine on managing finances in 2007. Prior to his business endeavour, Armin was with the Commerce International Merchant Bankers Berhad CIMB in corporate finance. Armin was the Executive Chairman for Jackspeed Industries (M) Sdn Bhd, a subsidiary of Jackspeed Corporation Ltd, a company listed on the main board of Singapore Exchange.

== Early life and education ==
Armin was born in Kuala Lumpur, Malaysia. His father, Datuk Pahamin Ab Rajab, was the founding chairman of Airasia and a former Secretary-General of Malaysia’s Ministry of Domestic Trade and Consumer Affairs.

At the age of 15, Armin was diagnosed with Chronic Myeloid Leukemia and underwent a successful bone marrow transplant at Hammersmith Hospital in London. Despite this early health challenge, he pursued his education rigorously and earned a Bachelor of Science (Honours) in Economics from the University of Buckingham, United Kingdom, in 1995.

Armin later earned his Doctor of Business Administration (DBA) with a CGPA 3.88 from the ELM Graduate School, HELP University. His doctoral research focused on electoral reform in Malaysia and was titled "Electoral Reform in Malaysia: Enhancing Accessibility, Reducing Cost, and Addressing Political and Institutional Dynamics through Digital Election".

== Career ==
=== Corporate Leadership and Business ===
Armin began his professional journey in corporate finance at Commerce International Merchant Bankers Berhad (CIMB). He later served as the Executive Chairman of Jackspeed Industries (M) Sdn Bhd, a subsidiary of Jackspeed Corporation Ltd listed on the Singapore Exchange.

In 2010, Armin was elected as the 3rd President of the Proton Edar Dealers Association Malaysia (PEDA). He led the national car dealers through the aftermath of the 1997 Asian Financial Crisis, three economic recessions, the take-over of Proton by DRB-Hicom then Geely and significant regulatory reforms, including amendments to the Hire Purchase Act and the implementation of the Goods and Services Tax (GST).

In 2015, Armin was appointed Managing Director of Fasfik (M) Sdn Bhd, where he expanded the automotive service chain to 55 outlets within 18 months, modelling the expansion after Thailand’s B-Quik business model. The network’s 40th outlet was officiated by then-Minister of Entrepreneur Development, Dato' Sri Khaled Nordin. He was the first Malaysian to established the largest chain of independent automotive service centre in Malaysia. He also sits on the board of other private limited companies.

=== Entrepreneurship ===
In 2014, Armin co-founded CarBengkel, an automotive aftermarket apps solution. The application won the VISA Retail Innovation Award in 2015.

He also founded Chief’s Original Bootcamp, a military-inspired outdoor fitness program that operated successfully for over a decade until the COVID-19 pandemic.

He is also the founders of other tech startups and businesses.

=== Business Advisory ===
Armin is an active business consultant and advisor, providing strategic guidance to corporations and small to medium-sized enterprises (SMEs) on corporate restructuring, business innovation, and leadership development.

== Board Membership and Organizational Involvement ==
Armin’s involvement in leadership and organizational activities began during his student years. At MARA Science College, he served as Chief Editor for the NCUK Program’s monthly bulletin and yearbook. While pursuing his undergraduate studies at the University of Buckingham, he was actively engaged in student governance, holding positions as an Executive Member of the Students' Union, Vice President of the Economics Society, and Deputy President of the Malaysian Students' Society.

After completing his studies, Armin continued his commitment to organizational leadership. He was a Founding Committee Member of Selangor Perdasama (Persatuan Pedagang dan Pengusaha Bumiputera Malaysia), an association aimed at supporting Bumiputera entrepreneurs. He subsequently served as President of the Proton Edar Dealers Association Malaysia (PEDA), and currently holds the position of President of Gerakan Ekonomi Malaysia (GEM).

== Political Involvement ==
Armin is a newcomer to politics and has not yet contested in any elections. He was personally invited by former Malaysian Prime Minister, Tun Dr. Mahathir Mohamad, to join a new political movement following Mahathir’s departure from Parti Pribumi Bersatu Malaysia (Bersatu). Along with several Members of Parliament and young leaders, Armin co-founded the Homeland Fighters Party (Parti Pejuang Tanahair) in 2020.

Following Tun Dr. Mahathir Mohamad's departure from Parti Pejuang Tanahair (PEJUANG), Armin played a central role in the formation of G13, a political movement comprising former members of PEJUANG’s Central Executive Committee and State Chiefs who also resigned in support of Dr. Mahathir. The name G13 was derived from the thirteen key leaders who left PEJUANG to align themselves with Dr. Mahathir’s continued political struggle. Over time, G13 emerged as the principal vehicle for advancing Dr. Mahathir’s political ideology, focusing on the defense of Malay rights, national sovereignty, and governance reform.

As President of Gerakan Ekonomi Malaysia (GEM), Armin champions sustainable and inclusive economic policies. He also serves as Secretary-General of Sekretariat Tanahair (STAR), where he focuses on governance reform, electoral integrity, and the promotion and protection of the rights of the Malays and Bumiputera as enshrined in the Federal Constitution.

== Party Positions ==
Armin has held several key positions within political movements. He served as a Central Executive Committee Member and the Chairman of the Economic Bureau of Parti Pejuang Tanahair (PEJUANG).

He is currently the Secretary-General of Sekretariat Tanahair (STAR) and a Member of the Council (Ahli Majlis) of Proklamasi Orang Melayu (POM). Additionally, he serves as the Secretary of G13.

POM, STAR, and G13 are unofficial establishments closely affiliated with the ideological leadership of Tun Dr. Mahathir Mohamad, focusing on the political empowerment of the Malay community and the defense of national sovereignty.

== Notable Campaigns ==
Armin has been active in political campaigning and advocacy. He participated in the Johor State By-Election (PRK Johor) and was involved in campaigning during the 15th Malaysian General Election (GE15), supporting Parti Pejuang Tanahair (PEJUANG) candidates across Kelantan, Selangor, Kuala Lumpur, and Johor.

Armin also launched the Pejuang Economic Movement Programme nationwide through the party’s parliamentary divisions, an initiative aimed at supporting 100,000 entrepreneurs and unemployed individuals, primarily from the bottom 40% (B40) income group. The programme was introduced in response to widespread retrenchments and economic challenges arising from the COVID-19 pandemic.

== Political Stance ==
Armin is an advocate for the economic and social advancement of the Malay community, emphasizing the importance of equitable welfare policies and entrepreneurship as key drivers of empowerment. He strongly supports free education and healthcare, believing they are fundamental rights essential to Malaysia's long-term progress.

A proponent of political reform through technology, Armin champions the adoption of digital election platforms to ensure broader voter participation and accessibility. He also advocates for the introduction of mandatory voting in Malaysia to enhance democratic legitimacy and ensure comprehensive citizen participation.

== Philanthropy ==
Armin is actively engaged in various charitable initiatives, reflecting his commitment to social responsibility and community development. He has organized blood donation campaigns to support national blood banks and led fundraising efforts for the Sabah Kidney Foundation and the National Cancer Council (MAKNA). He sponsored the construction of twenty borewells (perigi boring) to provide clean water for underprivileged families in Kelantan.

Continuing a legacy initiated by his late father, Armin has provided every year scholarships to thirty underprivileged students at SMK Kamil in Kelantan, a program that has been sustained for over two decades.

Since 2024, he has organized weekly food donations programmes at several mosques in Sungai Penchala and Taman Tun Dr Ismail, Kuala Lumpur, an initiative that remains active and ongoing.

== Controversies ==
Criticism of Sarawak's Stake in Petronas

In June 2025, Armin criticised DAP MP Chong Chieng Jen’s proposal for Sarawak to acquire a 30% stake in Petronas, arguing that it would undermine Malaysia’s federal economic structure.

Advocacy for Penang Fishermen

In July 2023, Armin criticized the government's handling of the Penang South Island (PSI) reclamation project, emphasizing the adverse impact on over 6,000 fishermen’s livelihoods.

Comments on Seditious Remarks Allegations

Comments on Seditious Remarks Allegations In June 2023, Armin defended Kedah Menteri Besar Muhammad Sanusi Md Nor’s right to freedom of expression amidst allegations of seditious remarks.

Critique of Tourism Promotion Video

In January 2025, he criticized Tourism Minister Tiong King Sing, stating that a promotional video for Visit Malaysia Year 2026 failed to reflect Malaysia’s Islamic heritage.

Support for Najib Razak’s Royal Pardon

In January 2025, he participated in the "Perhimpunan Solidariti Najib" rally, supporting the Yang di-Pertuan Agong’s constitutional authority to grant a royal pardon to former Prime Minister Najib Razak.

Opposition to CSO Advisory Paper

In June 2025, as Secretary-General of Sekretariat Tanahair, he publicly opposed the CSO Advisory Paper "Our ASEAN: Peoples At The Core," arguing it would undermine ASEAN’s sovereignty and promote Western liberal values.

Note: As of June 2025, the controversies documented above represent the primary publicly reported and verifiable instances of Armin Baniaz Pahamin's statements that have sparked media attention. Should additional, independently sourced statements emerge, they will be added to accurately reflect any future developments.

== Personal life ==
Armin is married to Anny Chunraem, and they have four children. He credits his family as a major influence and source of support throughout his career in business and politics.

== Achievements ==
Armin is a seasoned endurance athlete who has completed several major sporting events in Malaysia, including the Ironman 70.3 Triathlon in 2005, the Powerman Malaysia Duathlon in 2004, and the Kuala Lumpur International Marathon in 2008.

He also marked a significant personal milestone in 2025 by celebrating 36 years of being a leukemia survivor, a testament to his resilience since overcoming Chronic Myeloid Leukemia at age 15.

== Other references ==
- Mercury Securities Sdn Bhd (113193-W)(participating organisation of Bursa Malaysia) (http://www.mercurysecurities.com.my/DOC/MF120309.pdf), retrieved 24 May 2009
- Bernama News Fasfik eyes 30 pct Auto Services Sector Market Share
- Bernama News Armin Called on state and federal governments to eradicate the red tape for registration of authorised workshops to service Proton vehicles
- Business Times Direct Insurance Rebate will wreck auto dealers network
- The Star (Malaysia) Armin call government to set up Council to regulate automotive eco system
- The Utusan Kerajaan digesa campur tangan
- The Edge Financial Stimulus package doesn't fully address troubles of auto sector
- The Business Times Ways to get car sector moving again
- The New Straits Times Rate cut may hurt car sales
- The Harian Metro Gabungan pengedar-pengedar proton mampu tingkat jualan
- The Harian Metro Tingkat Jualan
- Bernama News PEDA wants to be market leader by next year
- Bernama Auto ARMIN: PEDA wants to be market leader
- Bernama OPR cut has minor impact on Proton car sales
- The Malaysian Digest Racial disharmony another manufactured ploy that is exploited and managed according to political needs?
- Bernama Red Tape Behind High Cost Of Proton Perdana Maintenance, Say Service Dealers
- Airasia Prospectus pg 170
- Malaysia Insurance OnlinePEDA- direct insurance rebate will destroy automotive eco system
