= Journal of Prosthetic Dentistry =

- Discipline: Prosthodontics
- Language: English
- Edited by: Stephen F. Rosenstiel

Publication details
- History: 1951–present
- Publisher: Elsevier on behalf of the Editorial Council for the Journal of Prosthetic Dentistry
- Frequency: Monthly
- Impact factor: 4.8 (2024)

Standard abbreviations
- ISO 4: J. Prosthet. Dent.

Indexing
- CODEN: JPDEAT
- ISSN: 0022-3913
- OCLC no.: 1782559

Links
- Journal homepage; Online access; Online archive; Journal page at Elsevier website

The Journal of Prosthetic Dentistry is a monthly peer-reviewed medical journal covering prosthodontics and restorative dentistry. It is published by Elsevier on behalf of the Editorial Council for the Journal of Prosthetic Dentistry and the editor-in-chief is Stephen F. Rosenstiel (Ohio State University). It is the official publication for 24 prosthodontic organisations.

== Abstracting and indexing ==
The journal is abstracted and indexed in Index Medicus/MEDLINE/PubMed and CINAHL. According to the Journal Citation Reports, the journal has a 2021 impact factor of 4.148.
