= Anila Sunder =

Indian classical dancer

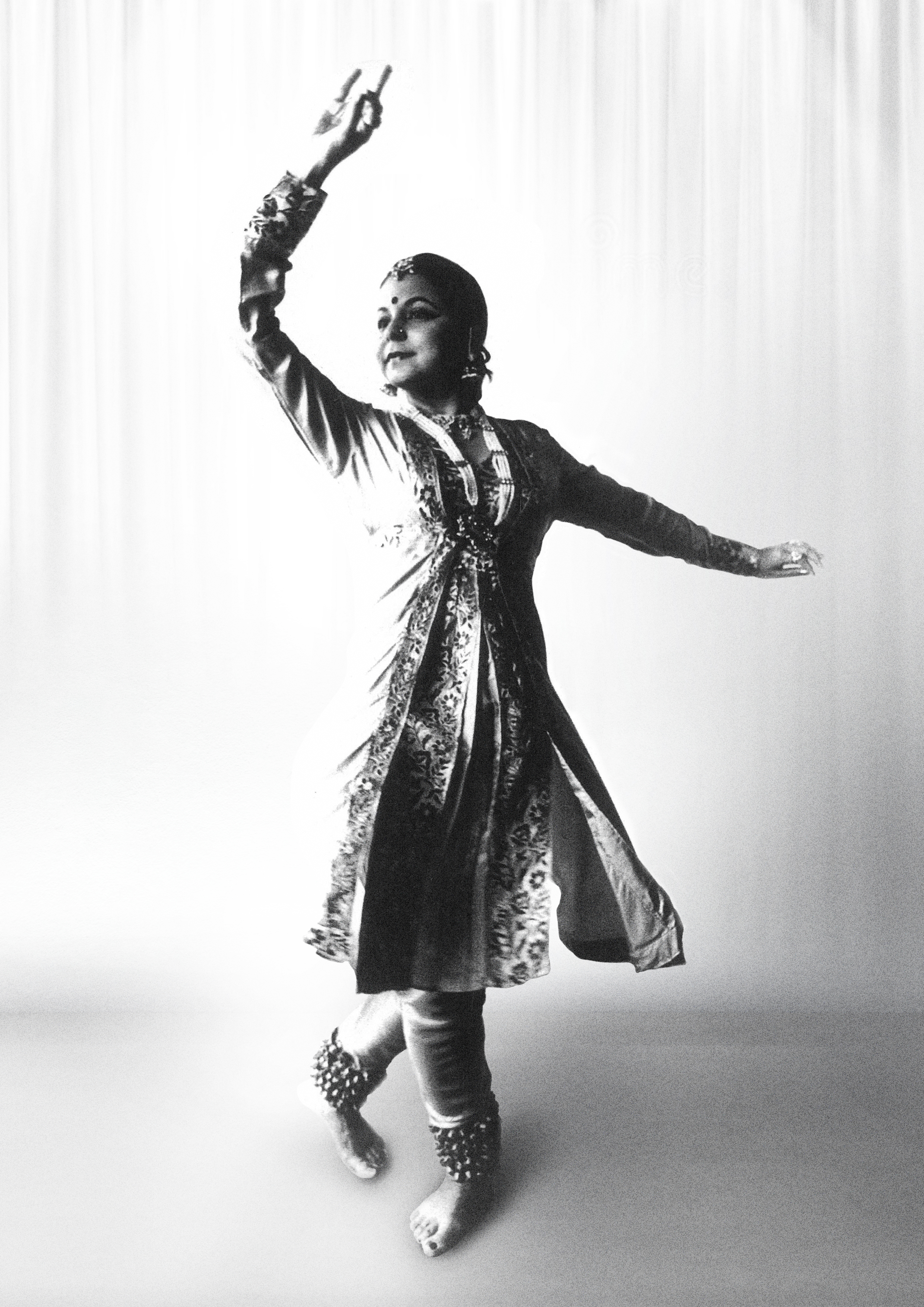
- Born: Anila Makhijani; India
- Occupations: Kathak and Odisi dancer
- Known for: Sindhi Ballets

Anila Sunder is an Indian classical dancer - Kathak and Odissi exponent - belonging to the Sindhi community. She has experimented with various themes and has incorporated few aspects of the Indian folk dance to give shape to the Sindhi dance drama. Some of her ballets include Sindhu that depicted the lost civilization of Mohenjodaro, Sikka Sajan Jee – love legends of Sindh, Theeu Na Juda Jani Munkhaan – questioning of love versus wealth, and Sindh Munhinjee Amma - narrated stories of the trials and tribulations of Sindhis from the India partition days.

== Early life ==
Anila Sunder was born on 11 November 1951 in Ulhasnagar to medical practitioners Dr.Nanki and Dr.Gobind Makhijani. She obtained a Master's Degree in Clinical Psychology at Mumbai University and was a lecturer at Jai Hind College, Mumbai. She graduated the Kathak Examination from Prayag Sangeet Samiti, Allahabad at the age of 11. She trained under the gurus Hazarilal and Damayanti Joshi, and later under Vijay Kumar Shreshtha.

== Career ==
She made her debut in the inter-collegiate classical dance competition at a Youth Festival organised by the University of Bombay in 1968. In 1971, she visited Japan as a Youth Exchange programme student sponsored by Lions Club of Bombay. Anila later learned Odissi from the gurus Natbar Maharana and Shankar Behra. She performed in 1999 at the Sixth International Sindhi Sammelan (Convention) in Orlando and with Long Island Sindhi Association in New York. In 1998 and 2000, she performed in Leh at Sindhu Darshan Mahotsav. Apart from India and USA, Anila has performed in various countries like Japan, West Africa, UAE, Scandinavian countries, and United Kingdom.

== Dance ballets ==
=== Sindhiyat Jee Surhan ===
Sindhiyat Jee Surhan translates to ‘Fragrance of the Sindhi Way of Life’. Anila based it on popular Sindhi festivals like Thadri that occurs on the eve of Janmashtami, Teejri, another festival which is an equivalent of Karva Chauth among Punjabis of India, Uttaran, a festival that coincides with Makar Sankranti, and also Cheti Chand which is the New Year's day for Sindhis and the birth day of the deity Jhulelal.

=== Sindhi Munhinjee Amma ===
Sindhi Munhinjee Amma brings to light the India-Pakistan partition and the impact of it on the Sindhi community, that went through the tragedy and trauma of being uprooted, to be settled in India. Anila plays a woman who was born in Sindh and goes through the turmoil of the partition.

=== Sikka Sajan Jee ===
Sikka Sajan Jee translates to ‘Longing for the Loved One’. This dance ballet is based on the stories of the six heroines of the immortal Sindhi Sufi poet Shah Abdul Latif. Anila depicts the yearning of Moomal, the agony of Sasui, the chastity of Maruee, the ecstasy of Noori, the repentance of Leelan, and the courage of Suhini.

=== Theeu Na Juda Jani Munkhaan ===
This dance ballet takes its inspiration from ‘Sur Saamoondi’, written by the Sindhi poet Shah Abdul Latif. Nai Duniya reported the presentation to be impressive and enchanting during one of the performances.

=== Geet Govind ===
She also performed a Hindi version of Geet Govind that was translated by professor Setpal. The ballet narrated the stories and emotions between Radha and Krishna.

=== Zaal . . . Kadenh Zer, Kadenh Zabar! ===
This dance ballet depicts the various forms and stages from the life of a woman, i.e. of a child, a beloved, a wife and a mother. Issues of assault, oppression and infanticide are highlighted. "The beauty of Anila Sunder's expressions was worth seeing. Through the presentation, the artists displayed that a woman is not weak. Rather she has the power of goddesses like Saraswati, Durga and Kali." a journalist wrote from Weekend Plus.

=== Sindhu Dhaara ===
This historical dance drama depicts the culture, heritage and era of an ancient civilization that flourished on the banks of the river Indus. "Anila Sunder showcased glimpses of the history of Sindh and the tragedy of partition through her dance. Amidst the unmatched synergy of sound and light, the audience was immersed in glimpses of the culture, that is Sindh." reported a journalist from Hari Bhoomi.

== Charitable performances ==
Anila Sunder also actively performed for social causes. In 1975, Anila performed in Nigeria for a fund raiser organized by Indian Women Residents in Lagos for the National Women Society of Nigeria. In India, she performed for the cancer hospital in Jabalpur in 2001 and also for raising funds for Kanyadan of poor girls in Bombay.
