= Armin Gruen =

German academic working in photogrammetry and geodesy

Professor Dr. Armin Gruen or Grün (born 27 April 1944 in Bad Berneck, Germany) is an academic working in photogrammetry and geodesy. From 1984, he was professor and head of photogrammetry at the Institute of Geodesy and Photogrammetry (IGP), Federal Institute of Technology (ETH) Zurich, Switzerland. He left in 2009 and works in the chair of information architecture, ETH Zurich Faculty of Architecture. He is a principal investigator on the simulation platform of the Singapore ETH Centre Future Cities Laboratory (SEC-FCL) in Singapore.

Gruen and his colleagues have worked on mapping and documenting the Nazca lines and on creating a 3D map of the Buddhas of Bamiyan.

== Academic career ==
Gruen graduated 1968 in geodetic science and obtained his doctorate degree 1974 in photogrammetry, both from the Technical University of Munich, Germany. From 1969 to 1975, he was a research and teaching associate, and until 1981 chief engineer at the Institute of Photogrammetry and Cartography, Technical University of Munich. From 1981 to 1984, he was associate professor at the department of geodetic science and surveying, Ohio State University, Columbus, Ohio, USA.

Gruen has held lecturing and research assignments at the University of the Bundeswehr Munich, Germany, Helsinki University of Technology, Finland, Università degli Studi di Firenze, Italy, Stanford Research Institute, Menlo Park, USA, Department of Geodesy at the Delft University of Technology, Netherlands, Asian Institute of Technology (AIT), Bangkok, Thailand, Department of Geomatics, University of Melbourne, Australia, Center for Space and Remote Sensing Research, National Central University, Jhongli City, Taiwan, SCUDO program of the Politecnico di Torino and compact courses at the Politecnico di Milano – Polo Regionale di Como, both Italy, Department of Geomatics, National Cheng Kung University, Tainan, Taiwan, CASM (Chinese Academy of Surveying and Mapping), Beijing, China and Shanghai Tongji University, China.

He has lectured at university level since 1969, with photogrammetry and remote sensing as major subjects, and surveying, cartography and adjustment calculus as minor subjects.

Gruen was the head of the department of geodetic sciences from 1996 to 97 and the dean of the faculty of rural engineering and surveying of ETH Zurich (1996–98). Through the Commission for Remote Sensing he was a member of the Swiss Academy of Natural Sciences. He is editor and co-editor of over 21 books and conference proceedings. He has been a consultant to government agencies, system manufacturers, and engineering firms in Germany, Japan, Korea, Switzerland, US, and other countries. He is co-founder of CyberCity AG, Zurich, and 4DiXplorer AG, Zurich, Switzerland.

He was the president of the International Society of Photogrammetry and Remote Sensing (ISPRS) Commission V, as ISPRS council member (second vice president), council member of the International Union of Surveys and Mapping (IUSM) and chairman of the ISPRS Financial Commission. He was chairman of the ISPRS International Scientific Advisory Committee (ISAC) and the ISPRS Ad-hoc Committee on "Knowledge Transfer", international member of the Fourth Academic Committee of the State Key Laboratory of Information Engineering in Surveying, Mapping and Remote Sensing (LIESMARS), Wuhan University, China, member of the First Academic Committee of the Key Laboratory of Mapping from Space of the Chinese Academy of Surveying and Mapping (CASM), and a member of the executive board of the Digital Earth Society, a member of the International Expert Committee for Strategic Development of Center for Earth Observation and Digital Earth (CEODE), Chinese Academy of Sciences, Beijing.

He was a member of the calibration/validation team and principal investigator for the PRISM sensor on JAXA's ALOS satellite and an ordinary member of the German Archaeological Institute (DAI).

Gruen and his colleagues have worked on mapping and documenting the Nazca lines. He was one of the scientific consultants on a documentary, Nasca lines: the buried secrets (2009, Edge West Productions). He has been part of a project to produce a 3D map of the Buddhas of Bamiyan, with the aim of recreating them.

== Awards and honors ==
Gruen's awards include the Otto von Gruber Gold Medal (ISPRS, 1980), Talbert Abrams Award Grand Trophy (ASPRS, 1985 and 1996), with Honorable Mention 1989, Fairchild Award (ASPRS, 1995), Miegunyah Distinguished Fellowship Award of the University of Melbourne (1999), ISPRS U.V. Helava Award (2000, with Martina Sinning-Meister and Hanbin Dan), E.H. Thompson Award (2005), ISPRS Brock Gold Medal Award (2008), Dr. Boon Indrabarya Gold Medal Award (2009), Yuri Gagarin Medal (Roskosmos, 2014).

He is a corresponding member of the German Geodetic Commission (Bavarian Academy of Sciences and Humanities, Munich), holds honorary professorships at Wuhan University, Wuhan, China and Yunnan Normal University, Kunming, China, and is an honorary member of the Japan Society of Photogrammetry and Remote Sensing (JSPRS) and the International Society of Photogrammetry and Remote Sensing (ISPRS).

== Research ==
Gruen's group's scientific achievements include (in chronological order):

- Studies of the processing of amateur photographs (including his PhD thesis "Reconstruction of rotation surfaces from single images")
- System calibration by self-calibration with additional parameters
- Reliability studies and blunder detection in bundle systems
- Algorithms for sequential estimation in bundle systems (on-line triangulation)
- Geometrically constrained multi-image least squares image matching
- CCD-camera based measurement systems in close-range photogrammetry ("videogrammetry")
- Development of the new concept of a Digital Photogrammetric Station with the first pilot system (DIPS1)
- Digital ortho-image generation on general low-cost computers
- PTV system for the measurement of flow structures
- First practical test for the integration of GPS and (simulated) INS observations into a photogrammetric bundle block, including self-calibration
- LSB-Snakes for line feature extraction
- CyberCity Modeler for semi-automated 3D city modeling
- 3D modeling and tracking of clouds from satellite and terrestrial imaging sensors
- 3D modeling in archaeology and cultural/natural heritage (among those are the Nazca geoglyphs, Mount Everest, Ayers Rock, the reconstruction of the Great Buddha of Bamyian, etc.)
- Implementation and testing of new sensor and trajectory models for aerial and satellite Linear Array cameras, including self-calibration, for calibration, geo-referencing, validation
- Advanced image matching for DSM generation
- 3D Least Squares Surface and Intensity matching
- UAV photogrammetry

His group's most recent major projects in 3D modeling of Cultural Heritage, based on photogrammetry, laser scanning and structured light, include: Nazca Lines/Geoglyphs, Adobe pyramids of Tucume, Machu Picchu, Pinchango Alto, petroglyphs of Chichictara (all Peru), Mount Everest, Ayers Rock (Australia), reconstruction of the two Great Buddhas of Bamiyan, pre-Columbian site of Xochicalco (Mexico), Maya site of Copan (Honduras), Bayon/Angkor Wat (Cambodia), Drapham Dzong (Bhutan), Weary Herakles (Antalya, Turkey), Khmer Head (Rietberg Museum), Zurich 1800 city model relief, Alfred Escher memorial, St. Gallen Globe (all Zurich), Pfyffer Relief (Lucerne).

Gruen's recent research interests include: automated object reconstruction with digital photogrammetric techniques, building and line feature extraction, 3D city modelling, image matching for digital terrain model generation and object extraction, Three-Line Linear Array sensor modelling, industrial quality control using vision techniques, motion capture, body and face reconstruction for animation, imaging techniques for generation and control of VRs/VEs, especially for cultural heritage recording and modelling, 3D processing of very high resolution satellite images, photogrammetric UAV research.

As principal investigator on the simulation platform of the SEC-FCL (Future Cities Laboratory) project, he is involved in Smart City applications of 3D/4D city models, including the generation and updating of those models from high-resolution satellite and UAV images.
