= Anila Bitri =

Albanian diplomat

Anila Bitri Lani (born in 1963, Tirana) is an Albanian diplomat. As of 2016, she is the Albanian ambassador to Italy.

She finished her studies at the University of Tirana in Spanish History and Language. She has been a lecturer in Medieval History at the university and has a Ph.D. for the Albanian-Spanish Medieval Relations at the University of Tirana and the University of Granada in Spain. In 2002 she served as Honorary Consul of Honor of Spain and at the end of his mandate was honored by King Juan Carlos for services to the Spanish state. Then she worked as an ambassador in Madrid. In the history of Albania's relations with Spain, Bitri is the most enduring ambassador. During her mandate, relations between the two countries have recognized a dynamic of development both in political, economic and cultural relations. In Spain, Bitri has been described as the "best foreign spanish ambassador".
