= Arnel Bluffs =

Coordinates: 68°7′S 56°12′E

Arnel Bluffs is a series of rock outcrops in a steeply-falling ice scarp south of the Leckie Range, Antarctica. It was plotted in December 1958 by an Australian National Antarctic Research Expeditions dog-sledge party led by G.A. Knuckey, and named by the Antarctic Names Committee of Australia for R.R. Arnel, geophysical assistant at Mawson Station, 1958.
