= Armin Wirth =

- Also known as: DJ Swam
- Born: July 15, 1971 (age 55); Traunstein, Bavaria, Germany
- Genres: Dance, Electro
- Occupations: DJ, Record producer, Record label manager
- Years active: 1993–present
- Website: www.feiyr.com

Armin Wirth (born 15 July 1971) who is also known by his pseudonym DJ Swam is a German dance-DJ, record producer and record label manager.

== Life ==
In 1993, Wirth opened one of the first online mail order Djshop. Until now, he had opened eight other branches in Great Britain, Hungary, Switzerland, Austria, Netherlands, Russia, Slovakia, and Czech Republic.

In 2001, Wirth founded DANCE ALL DAY, a record label, with Baccara Music, Bootleg Beats, Technosforza Rec., Vinyl Loop Records, München and Vinyl Loops Classics as sub labels.

With the Vinyl Loops Classics series he brought a vinyl series on the market, which has 21 episodes and which includes the who’s who of the dance and electro scene. The Vinyl-Loops Classics series is one of the most-sold vinyl dance compilations worldwide. Thereon you can hear Moby, The Prodigy, New Order, DJ Tiësto, Robert Miles, DJ Hell, Donna Summer, Todd Terry, ATB, Corey Hart, Chaka Khan and Stereo MCs. On 20 October 2003, a CD version of Vinyl Loops has been released at Amazon.

In 1999, Armin Wirth brought Content Partner into being. Content Partner is a community with more than 30 online shops worldwide, which are all using the same digital covers, audio samples and descriptions of articles for their online range of products. The most famous and biggest members are ExLibris from Switzerland, Esound Records from England and Imusik from Denmark.

In 2001, Armin Wirth published the hit Steve Murano – Passion, which was the first dance track in history ranked #1 in all four German dance charts like DDC, DMC, DJ Top 40 as well as in internet music charts, at the same time. Afterwards, the track was in the German Media Control Top 100. The music video of Steve Murano was shown on MTV and VIVA. Later, Kontor Records in Hamburg licensed this track and published it worldwide.

In 2005, Armin Wirth was part of the jury of Dance Music Award 2005. In collaboration with the German Phono-Akademie e. V., the magazine Raveline has drawn the attention back to Dance music, this happened in the course of CeBIT in Hanover. 120 experts of all entertainment industry branches have met to decide the winner of Dance Music Award 2005.

From 1997 – 2001, Armin Wirth worked for the editorial departments of ProSieben and MTV Europe, there he compiled the Top Ten Dance Charts.

As label manager Wirth released music on different record labels like Polystar Records, Intercord Tonträger GmbH, Sony Music Entertainment, Edel Records. He owns and runs the record labels München, Baccara Music, Fiume Beat, Vinyl Loop Records, Bottleg Beats, Forbidden, Loft, Technosforza Rec. and Vinyl Loops Classics.

In 2006, Armin Wirth invented the online portal Feiyr for independent musicians, producers, labels and book publishing houses. “Feiyr” is an online portal for the digital distribution of music as well as eBooks and sells music pieces without DRM to portals like iTunes, Amazon, Spotify or Napster. Feiyr is the only independent music distribution service which supplies independent music shops for the major labels Universal Music Group, Sony BMG (Sony and BMG joint-venture), Warner Music Group and EMI Music.

In April 2011, Feiyr had more than 1.2 million tracks which have been delivered to retail outlets.

Armin Wirth bought, as CEO and owner of Feiyr, the music platform Djtunes for €2,3 million, in 2013. DJTunes was financed by Karlheinz Brandenburg who invented MP3.

== Legal dispute ==
In 2006, the regional court Leipzig pronounced the judgment (Urteil v. 8. Februar 2005 - Az.: 5 O 146/05), that Armin Wirth isn’t allowed to use or display the word “Deejay“ as marketing measurement or on his homepages and audio hi-fi products anymore.

A German online shop owner claimed that he is the owner of all rights of the word “Deejay”. In January 2007, the regional appeal court Dresden declared that everyone can use “Deejay” and that this is a word which needs to keep a mark free for the trade.
