= Ermina =

Ermina is a feminine given name. Notable people with the name include:

- Ermina Lekaj Prljaskaj (born 1971), Croatian politician
- Ermina Zaenah (1927–2009), Indonesian actress and producer

== See also ==
- Ermin
