= Leckie Range (Antarctica) =

Mountain in Enderby Land, Antarctica

Coordinates: 67°55′S 56°27′E

The Leckie Range is a group of peaks 50 miles south of Edward VIII Bay, Enderby Land, Antarctica. The individual peaks were first shown on a 1947 Norwegian whalers chart by H.E. Hansen. The range was named by ANCA for Squadron Leader Douglas Leckie, RAAF, who commanded the RAAF Antarctic Flight at Mawson Station, 1956, and who piloted the Auster aircraft from which Phillip Law sighted and plotted these peaks.

== See also ==
- Arnel Bluffs
- Leslie Peak
- Mount Allport
- Mount Cook
