= Mount Cook (Antarctica) =

Mountain in Enderby Land, Antarctica

Mount Cook (67°55′S 56°28′E) is a mountain, roughly 1,900 m high, that is the highest point of the main massif of the Leckie Range in Antarctica. Approximately mapped by Norwegian cartographers on Norwegian whalers chart No. 3. Plotted from air photos taken by ANARE (Australian National Antarctic Research Expeditions) in 1956, and first visited by G.A. Knuckey of ANARE in December 1956, when its position was fixed. Named by Antarctic Names Committee of Australia (ANCA) for B.G. Cook, geophysicist at Mawson station in 1958.

== See also ==
- Mount Saw
- Mount Treatt
