= Anel (given name) =

Male given name

- Gender: Male

Other gender
- Feminine: Anela

Origin
- Meaning: Righteous ruler, just emperor, to be remembered forever

Other names
- Variant form: Arnel

Anel is a male given name.

In the Balkans, Anel is popular among the Bosniaks in the former countries of Yugoslav. The name is a modification of Anil, and it holds the same meanings: righteous ruler, just emperor, and to be remembered forever. The name's variant, Arnel, is also frequently used among the Bosniak population.

== Given name ==
- Anel Ahmedhodžić (born 1999), Swedish footballer of Bosnian descent
- Anel Dedić (born 1991), Bosnian footballer
- Anel Hadžić (born 1989), Bosnian footballer
- Anel Hajrić (born 1996), Bosnian footballer
- Anel Hebibović (born 1990), Bosnian footballer
- Anel Husić (born 2001), Swiss footballer of Bosnian descent
- Anel Karabeg (born 1962), Bosnian football manager
- Anel Pirić (born 2004), Bosnian footballer
- Anel Rashkaj (born 1989), Kosovan footballer
- Anel Šabanadžović (born 1999), Bosnian footballer
- Anel Sudakevich (born 1906–2002), Soviet silent film actress
