= Wrestling at the 1976 Summer Olympics – Men's freestyle 82 kg =

Men's freestyle 82 kg at the Games of the XXI Olympiad
- Venue: Maurice Richard Arena
- Dates: 27–31 July 1976
- Competitors: 18 from 18 nations

Medalists
1st place, gold medalist(s)		John Peterson	United States
2nd place, silver medalist(s)		Viktor Novozhilov	Soviet Union
3rd place, bronze medalist(s)		Adolf Seger	West Germany

The Men's Freestyle 82 kg at the 1976 Summer Olympics as part of the wrestling program were held at the Maurice Richard Arena.

== Medalists ==
Gold	John Peterson; United States
Silver	Viktor Novozhilov; Soviet Union
Bronze	Adolf Seger; West Germany

== Tournament results ==
The competition used a form of negative points tournament, with negative points given for any result short of a fall. Accumulation of 6 negative points eliminated the loser wrestler. When only three wrestlers remain, a special final round is used to determine the order of the medals.

Legend

- TF — Won by Fall
- IN — Won by Opponent Injury
- DQ — Won by Passivity
- D1 — Won by Passivity, the winner is passive too
- D2 — Both wrestlers lost by Passivity
- FF — Won by Forfeit
- DNA — Did not appear
- TPP — Total penalty points
- MPP — Match penalty points

Penalties

- 0 — Won by Fall, Technical Superiority, Passivity, Injury and Forfeit
- 0.5 — Won by Points, 8-11 points difference
- 1 — Won by Points, 1-7 points difference
- 2 — Won by Passivity, the winner is passive too
- 3 — Lost by Points, 1-7 points difference
- 3.5 — Lost by Points, 8-11 points difference
- 4 — Lost by Fall, Technical Superiority, Passivity, Injury and Forfeit

=== Round 1 ===
TPP	MPP		Score		MPP	TPP
4	4	Masaru Motegi (JPN)	TF / 1:03	Ismail Abilov (BUL)	0	0
4	4	David Aspin (NZL)	TF / 1:18	Chimidiin Gochoosüren (MGL)	0	0
0	0	Viktor Novozhilov (URS)	DQ / 8:42	Vasile Iorga (ROU)	4	4
0	0	Richard Deschatelets (CAN)	DQ / 5:54	Imad Faddoul (LIB)	4	4
0	0	John Peterson (USA)	TF / 1:18	Anthony Shacklady (GBR)	4	4
4	4	André Bouchoule (FRA)	5 - 18	Adolf Seger (FRG)	0	0
0	0	István Kovács (HUN)	DQ / 7:39	Mohammad Hossein Mohebbi (IRI)	4	4
4	4	Manuel Villapol (PUR)	DQ / 7:43	Ibrahim Diop (SEN)	0	0
1	1	Henryk Mazur (POL)	9 - 4	Mehmet Uzun (TUR)	3	3

=== Round 2 ===
TPP	MPP		Score		MPP	TPP
4	0	Masaru Motegi (JPN)	TF / 0:41	David Aspin (NZL)	4	8
0	0	Ismail Abilov (BUL)	TF / 5:01	Chimidiin Gochoosüren (MGL)	4	4
0	0	Viktor Novozhilov (URS)	TF / 0:42	Richard Deschatelets (CAN)	4	4
4	0	Vasile Iorga (ROU)	DQ / 7:37	Imad Faddoul (LIB)	4	8
0	0	John Peterson (USA)	DQ / 8:43	André Bouchoule (FRA)	4	8
8	4	Anthony Shacklady (GBR)	TF / 2:32	Adolf Seger (FRG)	0	0
0	0	István Kovács (HUN)	TF / 2:06	Manuel Villapol (PUR)	4	8
7	3	Mohammad Hossein Mohebbi (IRI)	10 - 13	Henryk Mazur (POL)	1	2
4	4	Ibrahim Diop (SEN)	DQ / 5:26	Mehmet Uzun (TUR)	0	3

=== Round 3 ===
TPP	MPP		Score		MPP	TPP
4	0	Masaru Motegi (JPN)	DQ / 7:00	Chimidiin Gochoosüren (MGL)	4	8
3.5	3.5	Ismail Abilov (BUL)	2 - 11	Viktor Novozhilov (URS)	0.5	0.5
5	1	Vasile Iorga (ROU)	8 - 6	Richard Deschatelets (CAN)	3	7
0.5	0.5	John Peterson (USA)	14 - 4	Adolf Seger (FRG)	3.5	3.5
3	3	István Kovács (HUN)	7 - 8	Mehmet Uzun (TUR)	1	4
8	4	Ibrahim Diop (SEN)	TF / 5:21	Henryk Mazur (POL)	0	2

=== Round 4 ===
TPP	MPP		Score		MPP	TPP
8	4	Masaru Motegi (JPN)	TF / 1:34	Viktor Novozhilov (URS)	0	0.5
3.5	0	Ismail Abilov (BUL)	TF / 3:48	Vasile Iorga (ROU)	4	9
1.5	1	John Peterson (USA)	10 - 3	István Kovács (HUN)	3	6
3.5	0	Adolf Seger (FRG)	26 - 6	Henryk Mazur (POL)	4	6
4		Mehmet Uzun (TUR)		Bye		

=== Round 5 ===
TPP	MPP		Score		MPP	TPP
4	0	Mehmet Uzun (TUR)	DQ / 7:30	Ismail Abilov (BUL)	4	7.5
4.5	4	Viktor Novozhilov (URS)	4 - 20	John Peterson (USA)	0	1.5
3.5		Adolf Seger (FRG)		Bye		

=== Round 6 ===
TPP	MPP		Score		MPP	TPP
6.5	3	Adolf Seger (FRG)	9 - 13	Viktor Novozhilov (URS)	1	5.5
7.5	3.5	Mehmet Uzun (TUR)	5 - 13	John Peterson (USA)	0.5	2

=== Final ===
Results from the preliminary round are carried forward into the final (shown in yellow).

TPP	MPP		Score		MPP	TPP
	0.5	John Peterson (USA)	14 - 4	Adolf Seger (FRG)	3.5	
	4	Viktor Novozhilov (URS)	4 - 20	John Peterson (USA)	0	0.5
6.5	3	Adolf Seger (FRG)	9 - 13	Viktor Novozhilov (URS)	1	5

== Final standings ==
1. John Peterson (USA)
2. Viktor Novozhilov (URS)
3. Adolf Seger (FRG)
4. Mehmet Uzun (TUR)
5. Ismail Abilov (BUL)
6. Henryk Mazur (POL)
7. István Kovács (HUN)
8. Masaru Motegi (JPN)
