= Wrestling at the 1980 Summer Olympics – Men's freestyle 82 kg =

Men's freestyle 82 kg at the Games of the XXII Olympiad
- Venue: Central Sports Club of the Army
- Dates: 29–31 July 1980
- Competitors: 14 from 14 nations

Medalists
1st place, gold medalist(s)		Ismail Abilov	Bulgaria
2nd place, silver medalist(s)		Magomedkhan Aratsilov	Soviet Union
3rd place, bronze medalist(s)		István Kovács	Hungary

The Men's Freestyle 82 kg at the 1980 Summer Olympics as part of the wrestling program were held at the Athletics Fieldhouse, Central Sports Club of the Army.

== Medalists ==
Gold	Ismail Abilov; Bulgaria
Silver	Magomedkhan Aratsilov; Soviet Union
Bronze	István Kovács; Hungary

== Tournament results ==
The competition used a form of negative points tournament, with negative points given for any result short of a fall. Accumulation of 6 negative points eliminated the loser wrestler. When only three wrestlers remain, a special final round is used to determine the order of the medals.

Legend

- TF — Won by Fall
- IN — Won by Opponent Injury
- DQ — Won by Passivity
- D1 — Won by Passivity, the winner is passive too
- D2 — Both wrestlers lost by Passivity
- FF — Won by Forfeit
- DNA — Did not appear
- TPP — Total penalty points
- MPP — Match penalty points

Penalties

- 0 — Won by Fall, Technical Superiority, Passivity, Injury and Forfeit
- 0.5 — Won by Points, 8-11 points difference
- 1 — Won by Points, 1-7 points difference
- 2 — Won by Passivity, the winner is passive too
- 3 — Lost by Points, 1-7 points difference
- 3.5 — Lost by Points, 8-11 points difference
- 4 — Lost by Fall, Technical Superiority, Passivity, Injury and Forfeit

=== Round 1 ===
TPP	MPP		Score		MPP	TPP
1	1	István Kovács (HUN)	3 - 3	Günter Busarello (AUT)	3	3
4	4	Zachée N'Dock (CMR)	TF / 4:21	Mohammad El-Oulabi (SYR)	0	0
4	4	Sören Claeson (SWE)	TF / 4:01	Ismail Abilov (BUL)	0	0
4	4	Ahmadjan Khashan (AFG)	DQ / 7:59	Henryk Mazur (POL)	0	0
4	4	Vasile Ţigănaş (ROU)	TF / 1:43	Zevegiin Düvchin (MGL)	0	0
4	4	Armin Weier (GDR)	TF / 5:04	Magomedkhan Aratsilov (URS)	0	0
4	4	Abdul Rahman Mohammed (IRQ)	TF / 7:31	Abdula Memedi (YUG)	0	0

=== Round 2 ===
TPP	MPP		Score		MPP	TPP
1	0	István Kovács (HUN)	TF / 4:48	Zachée N'Dock (CMR)	4	8
3	0	Günter Busarello (AUT)	DQ / 6:58	Mohammad El-Oulabi (SYR)	4	4
7	3	Sören Claeson (SWE)	5 - 11	Henryk Mazur (POL)	1	1
0	0	Ismail Abilov (BUL)	TF / 0:46	Vasile Ţigănaş (ROU)	4	8
1	1	Zevegiin Düvchin (MGL)	14 - 11	Armin Weier (GDR)	3	7
0	0	Magomedkhan Aratsilov (URS)	TF / 1:48	Abdulrahman Mohammed (IRQ)	4	8
0		Abdula Memedi (YUG)		Bye		
4		Ahmadjan Khashan (AFG)		DNA		

=== Round 3 ===
TPP	MPP		Score		MPP	TPP
3	3	Abdula Memedi (YUG)	3 - 4	István Kovács (HUN)	1	2
7	4	Günter Busarello (AUT)	DQ / 7:25	Ismail Abilov (BUL)	0	0
7.5	3.5	Mohammad El-Oulabi (SYR)	6 - 15	Henryk Mazur (POL)	0.5	1.5
5	4	Zevegiin Düvchin (MGL)	DQ / 5:49	Magomedkhan Aratsilov (URS)	0	0

=== Round 4 ===
TPP	MPP		Score		MPP	TPP
7	4	Abdula Memedi (YUG)	TF / 4:19	Ismail Abilov (BUL)	0	0
3	1	István Kovács (HUN)	6 - 4	Zevegiin Düvchin (MGL)	3	8
5.5	4	Henryk Mazur (POL)	TF / 5:49	Magomedkhan Aratsilov (URS)	0	0

=== Round 5 ===
TPP	MPP		Score		MPP	TPP
4	1	István Kovács (HUN)	7 - 4	Henryk Mazur (POL)	3	8.5
1	1	Ismail Abilov (BUL)	8 - 4	Magomedkhan Aratsilov (URS)	3	3

=== Final ===
Results from the preliminary round are carried forward into the final (shown in yellow).

TPP	MPP		Score		MPP	TPP
	1	Ismail Abilov (BUL)	8 - 4	Magomedkhan Aratsilov (URS)	3	
	4	István Kovács (HUN)	TF / 1:48	Ismail Abilov (BUL)	0	1
3	0	Magomedkhan Aratsilov (URS)	18 - 1	István Kovács (HUN)	4	8

== Final standings ==
1. Ismail Abilov (BUL)
2. Magomedkhan Aratsilov (URS)
3. István Kovács (HUN)
4. Henryk Mazur (POL)
5. Abdula Memedi (YUG)
6. Zevegiin Düvchin (MGL)
7. Günter Busarello (AUT)
8. Mohammad El-Oulabi (SYR)
