= Edges (magazine) =

Canadian writing journal

Edges Literary Magazine
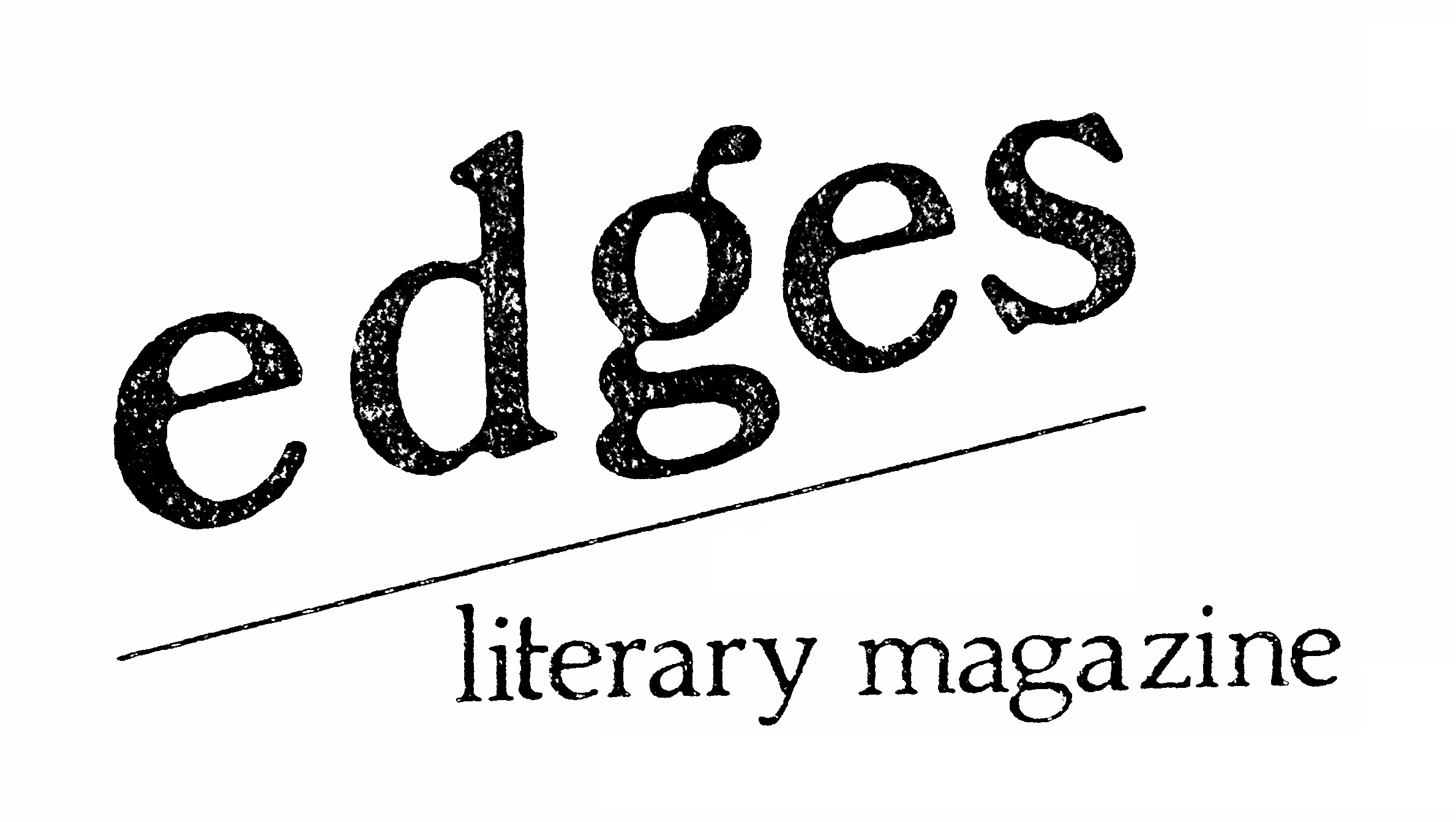
- Editor: Andrew Thompson
- Copy editor: Steve Edwards
- Frequency: Triannual
- Format: Print
- Publisher: Ledges Publishing Society
- Founded: 1986
- Final issue: August 1988
- Based in: Edmonton, Canada
- Language: English
- ISSN: 0833-0077
- OCLC: 1080978779

Edges Literary Magazine was a creative writing journal of poetry and short fiction published in Edmonton, Canada in the 1980s. Edges Literary Magazine was published by the Ledges Publishing Society.

== History ==
Edges was founded in 1986 by Edmontonian poet Steve Edwards and by Andrew Thompson, who had been working as the librarian of the Fort Saskatchewan Prison outside Edmonton. Unlike university-sponsored Canadian literary journals such as The Malahat Review and The New Quarterly, Edges held no institutional affiliation and was recognized for its open-minded editorial policy for "the literate and semi-literate." In some instances, Canadian writers who went on to have lengthy publishing careers were first published in Edges; for example, Gail Sidonie Sobat's first publication "Today She Was in Curlers," was published in Edges Literary Magazine in 1986. In 1987, The Gateway reported that Edges' editorial team had a preference for free verse as opposed to pieces employing poetic rhyme. In February 1988, Edges published work by Evan C. Jones, the former drummer of Canadian punk band SNFU; Edges reported that "Evan C. Jones was once a member of the SNFU band of Edmonton; he says he is ready for a valiant come back." The magazine was headquartered in the Edmonton neighborhood of Strathearn at 8710 97 Avenue, Suite C.

Edges published seven collections of creative writing between 1986 and 1988. Although the publication was nearing its dissolution in the summer of 1988, the Edmonton Journal nevertheless described Edges' publishers as "ever-energetic" in July of that year.

Despite the fact that Edges' publication history was limited to the late 1980s, the journal published more than 100 pieces from Canadian writers such as Aaron Bushkowsky, Cecelia Frey, Beth Goobie, Robert Hogg, Nancy Holmes, Cornelia Hoogland, Inge Israel, Sid Marty, Monty Reid, Richard Stevenson, John Weier and Ralph D. Witten.

== Events ==
In the late 1980s, the Ledges Publishing Society frequently organized poetry readings in conjunction with the release of each issue. These events often took place at the Marc Bistro and Gallery in Edmonton and at Blue Nile Ethiopian and European Restaurant on Whyte Avenue and 109th Street. In August 1988, Edges published a special edition of the magazine in conjunction with the seventh annual Edmonton International Fringe Festival; the Ledges Publishing Society sponsored a poetry reading during the festival which recurred daily at one of the registered Fringe venues in place of a typical Fringe play.

== Issues ==
- Volume 1 (November 1986)
- Volume 2, Number 1 (February 1987)
- Volume 2, Number 2 (May 1987)
- Volume 2, Number 3 (August 1987)
- Volume 3, Number 1 (February 1988)
- Volume 3, Number 2 (May 1988)
- Volume 3, Number 3 (August 1988)
