= Villapol =

Villapol is a surname. Notable people with the surname include:

- Fernando Villapol (born 1953), Spanish sculptor, museum curator and art critic
- Manuel Villapol (born 1956), Puerto Rican wrestler
- María Villapol (born 1967), Venezuelan judoka
- Nitza Villapol (1923–1998), Cuban chef, cookbook writer and television host
