= Weier =

Weier is a surname. Notable people with the surname include:

- Armin Weier (born 1956), German wrestler
- John Weier (born 1949), Canadian poet
- Kelsey Weier (born 1991), American television personality and beauty queen
- Lindsey Weier (born 1984), American cross-country skier
- Lloyd Weier (1938-2003), Australian rugby player
- Michael Weier (born 1997), Australian football player
- Paul Weier (born 1934), Swiss equestrian
