= Mónica Weiss =

Argentine illustrator, artist, writer and architect

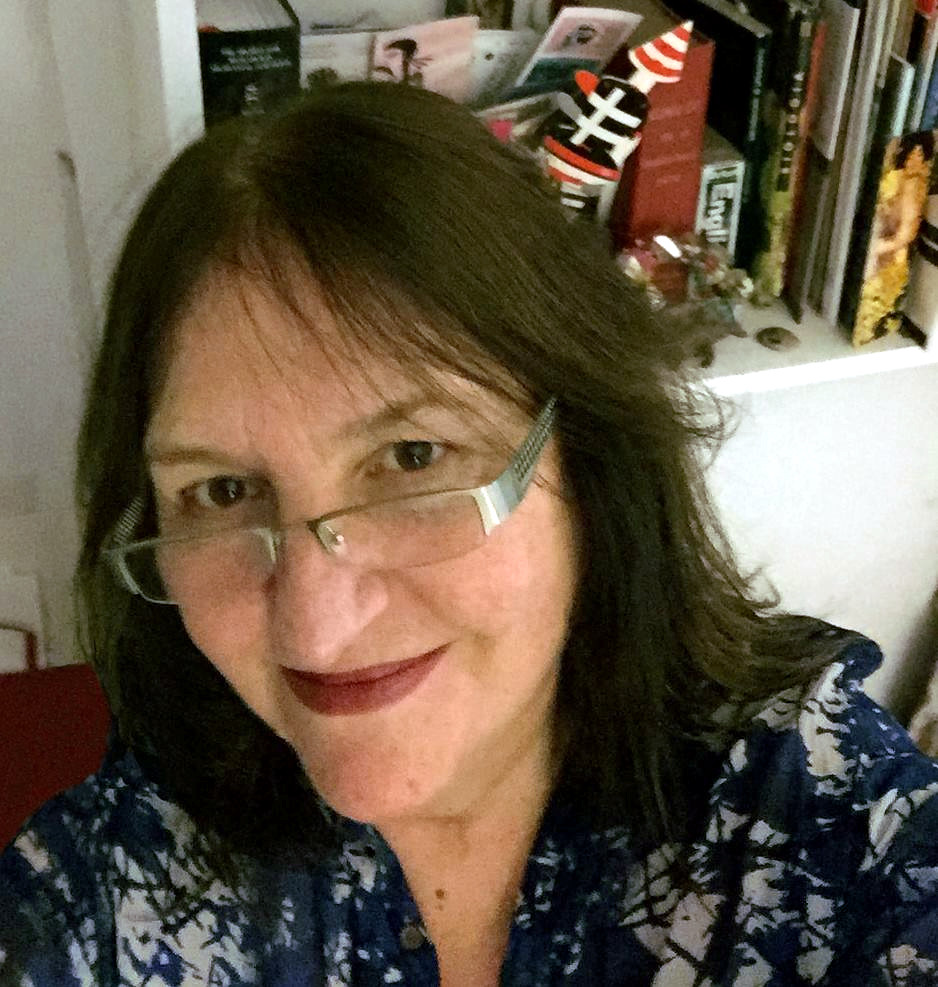
- Mónica Weiss in her studio
- Born: September 29, 1956
- Education: Illustration, architecture, art
- Known for: Illustration
- Website: https://www.monicaweiss.com

Mónica Weiss (born 29 September 1956) is an Argentine illustrator, artist, writer and architect (Buenos Aires University). She has illustrated more than 140 books and has actively worked for the rights of illustrators and to show the importance of illustration in Argentina.

== Early life and education ==
Mónica Weiss was born in Adrogué, province of Buenos Aires. Since she was 5 years old she studied painting and engraving with Nelia Licenziato and piano with Susana Agrest and classical dance with Marta de Lourenço. She studied architecture at Buenos Aires University and graduated in 1982. She remained at the university as a Design teacher in the same career. She worked as an architect for twelve years until she was asked to illustrate which would be her first editorial work Historieta de amor by writer Graciela Cabal for the Editorial Sudamericana.

== Work ==
Her work in the illustration field includes the illustration of children books, curating art exhibitions, teaching and giving lectures and presentations in Book Fairs. As an illustrator she has over 140 picture books published.

She was a guest artist of the National Reading Plan (initiative by the Education Ministry to encourage reading in schools) and she was director of the Foro de Ilustradores Argentinos (Argentine illustrators organisation), an association promoting the work of Argentine illustrators, from 1998 to 2005.

She was Vice President of Asociación de Literatura Infantil y Juvenil de Argentina (ALIJA) (IBBY Argentina).

She was a member of the Organisation Commission of the Buenos Aires Children's Book Fair and has participated in the radio program 'El frasco sin tapa' about illustrated books, in FM Palermo. She has published articles about illustration in international specialised magazines such as La mancha (Córdoba), Nuevas Hojas de Lectura (Bogotá) Cultura LIJ (Buenos Aires) and Catalejos (Mar del Plata). In 2018 she published the Master Class "Illustrate for children, young people, adults?" at the request of the OEI- Organisation of Ibero-American States.

From 2001 she teaches Picture Book illustration in 'Taller m' in Buenos Aires where she has guided many internationally recognised illustrators through their creative processes.

She is a consultant for the International Illustration Museum Campus Culturae USC of Santiago de Compostela University, Spain.

=== Books ===
Mónica Weiss has worked with recognised writers such as Silvia Schujer, Canela, Graciela Repún, Isabel Freire de Matos, María Cristina Ramos and Graciela Cabal. Some of her published books are:

- Vacaciones de dinosaurio (Penguin Random House SUDAMERICANA, 2006) ISBN 9500727218
- Todo el mundo volverá. (Editorial Comunicarte. 2014) by Ricardo Chávez Castañeda.
- Navidad blanca (Editorial Comunicarte, Argentina 2011)
- Hugo tiene hambre. (Editorial Norma. Bogotá-Buenos Aires 2006)
- Así se baila el tango. (Ed Además. 2004)
- Quién está detrás de esa casa? (Buenos Aires, Ediciones del Eclipse, 2003. Colección Libros-álbum del Eclipse.)
- El sastrecillo valiente (Editorial Atlántida, 2004. Series 'Cuentos de la Valijita') 'Brave little tailor' by Grimm brothers, adapted by Silvia Schujer.
- La fábrica de cristal (Editorial Comunicarte. Argentina. Series 'Los veinte escalones' 2003-)
- Pascualita Gómez (Editorial Comunicarte. Argentina. Series 'Los veinte escalones' 2003-)
- La calle es mía (Editorial Comunicarte. Argentina. Series 'Los veinte escalones' 2003-)
- Tres de amor (Editorial Comunicarte. Argentina. Series 'Los veinte escalones' 2003-)
- La casita azul (Editorial Comunicarte. Argentina. Series 'Los veinte escalones' 2003-)
- Un perro llamado cual (Editorial Comunicarte. Argentina. Series 'Los veinte escalones' 2003-)
- Próspero, Collection ' los veinte escalones' 39 books illustrated. Ed Comunicarte. Argentina. (2003-)
- Cumpleaños de dinosaurio. (Buenos Aires, Editorial Sudamericana, 2001. Series 'Los Caminadores')
- Leyendas argentinas, (Buenos Aires, Grupo Editorial Norma, 2001. Colección Torre de Papel) by Graciela Repún.
- Historieta de amor (Buenos Aires, Editorial Sudamericana, 1995. Series 'Pan Flauta') by Graciela Cabal
- 'Colección Lola'(Lola cuenta patos, Lola descubre el aire, Lola va a la plaza, Lola descubre el agua, Lola descubre el fuego and Lola va a dormir) (Buenos Aires, Editorial Sudamericana)
- Jacinto (Buenos Aires, Editorial Sudamericana, 1997. Series 'Pan Flauta') by Graciela Cabal.
- Del amor nacen los ríos (Buenos Aires, Editorial Sudamericana, 1998. Series 'Cuentamérica') by María Cristina Ramos.
- Abriendo Las Ventanitas (Cantaro Editores) by Carlos Gianni, Hugo Midon and Mónica Weiss.
- El Pueblo de Mala Muerte (Series 'Veinte Escalones'. Comunicarte Editorial) written by Sandra Comino.
- Azul la Cordillera (Series 'Torre de Papel', Editorial Norma) written by Maria Cristina Ramos.

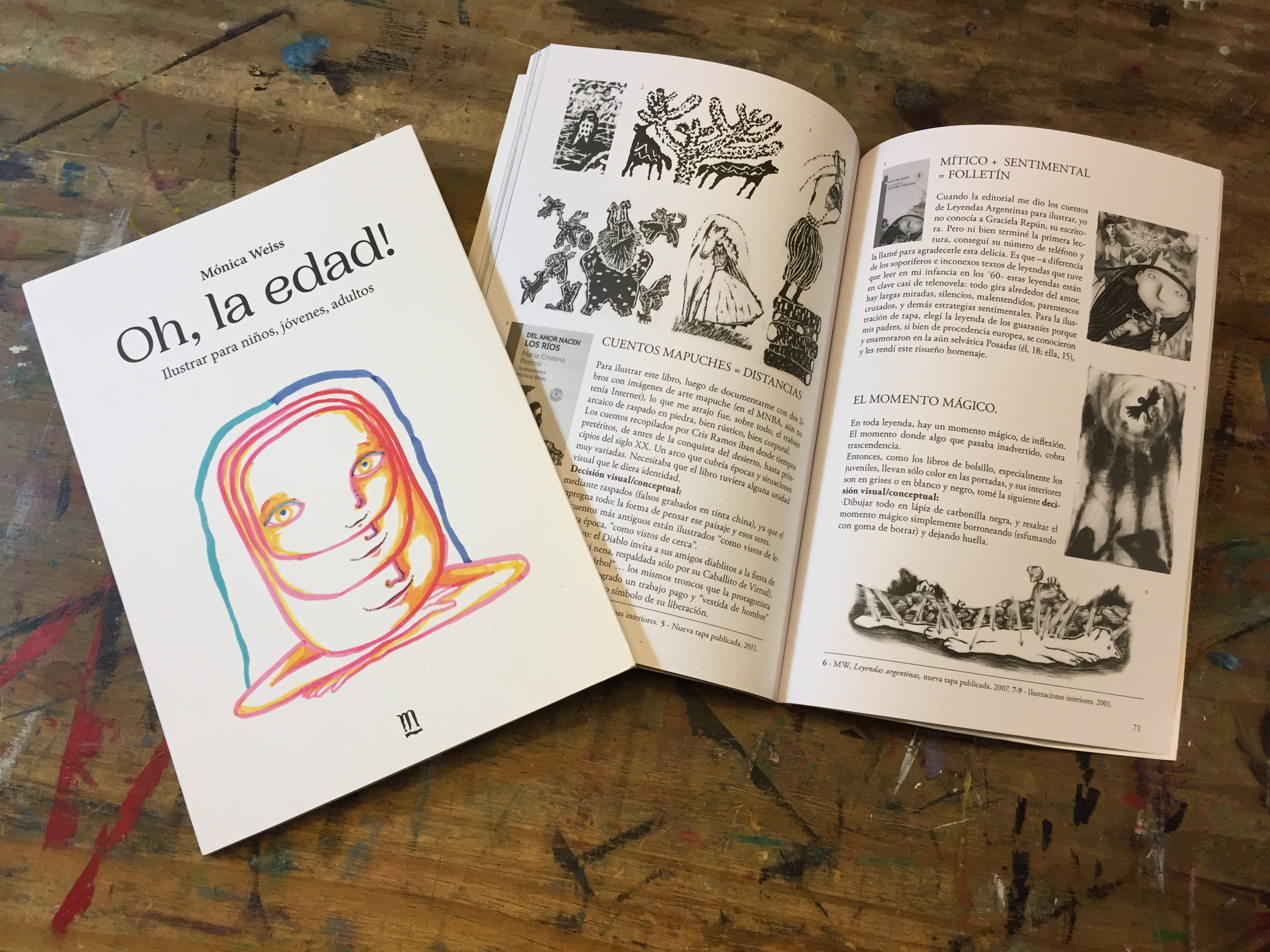

=== Exhibitions ===
- 'La historia de un libro' exhibition showing the process of her Book 'Hugo tiene Hambre'. Central de Procesos, Buenos Aires, 2017.
- 'Atracción e inspiración. El libro álbum como promotor de la lectura'. Feria del Libro Infantil y Juvenil, Mar del Plata, Buenos Aires, 2017.
- 'Cuaderno de inspiración' Inspiration sketchbook. (Paintings, videos and an illustrated handbook). Centro Cultural Recoleta, Buenos Aires, 2014.
- 'IlustraMundos' with Elena Odriozola, Piet Grobler, Fernando Vilela, Machiel Braaksma, Marc Taeger, Carme Solé Vendrell, David Pintor, Kristina Sabatie, Antonio Seijas and Johanna Drewnowicz. Palacio Fonseca Exhibition Hall, Santiago de Compostela, Spain, 2012.
- Feria del Libro de Córdoba (Argentina, 1999).
- 6º Congreso Internacional de Literarura Infantil y Juvenil del CEDILIJ (Villa Carlos Paz, Córdoba, Argentina, 1999).
- Museo del Mercadillo (Córdoba, Argentina, 2000).
- Centro Cultural Juan Martín de Pueyrredón (Mar del Plata, Buenos Aires, Argentina, 2000).
- Muestra Latinoamericana de Ilustración de IBBY (Cartagena de Indias, Colombia, 2000).
- Centro de Exposiciones de la Municipalidad de Tucumán (San Miguel de Tucumán, Argentina, 2001).
- Centro de Congresos y Exposiciones de Mendoza (Argentina, 2001).
- Museo de Bellas Artes del Chaco (Resistencia, Chaco, Argentina, 2001).
- Centro Cívico de San Carlos de Bariloche (Río Negro, Argentina, 2001).
- Galería Rubbers (Buenos Aires, Argentina, 2001).
- Bienal Internacional de Ilustración de Bratislava (Eslovaquia, 1997, 1999, 2001 and 2003).
- Feria del Libro de Bahía Blanca (Provincia de Buenos Aires, Argentina, 2002).
- Feria del Libro Infantil y Juvenil de Buenos Aires (Argentina, 1999, 2002 y 2003).
- Feria Internacional del Libro de Buenos Aires (Argentina, 2003 and 2004).
- Salas Nacionales de Exposición Palais de Glace (Buenos Aires, Argentina, 2003).
- Centro Cultural Recoleta (Buenos Aires, Argentina, 1998 and 2004).

=== Art Curator ===
Exhibitions in Argentina:

- 'Aguafuertes Porteñas de Roberto Arlt' for BACML/UNESCO. Group exhibition. 250 illustrators. Buenos Aires, 2012
- Exhibitions for AMIA at the Centro Cultural Recoleta; “Sin Palabras. Memoria Ilustrada 2013” with 143 artists (with Federico Combi, Nora Hilb y O´Keif between others) and "Afiches para no olvidar. Memoria Ilustrada 2013' with 19 illustrators (Luis Scafati, Carlos Nine, Daniel Roldán, Juan Lima, Alma Larroca, Santiago Caruso, Mariana Chiesa, Pablo Bernasconi, Mónica Weiss, Max Aguirre, Pablo Zweig, Pablo Picyk, José Sanabria, Félix Rodríguez, Matías Trillo, Federico Combi, Mónica Pironio, Federico Porfiri and María Abásolo). Buenos Aires, 2013.
- Seven National Exhibitions of the Foro de Ilustradores (41 to 200 artists) at Centro Cultural Recoleta and International Book Fair of Buenos Aires. Also shown in Mar del Plata, Mendoza, Córdoba, Tucumán, Bariloche, Bahía Blanca.
- La máquina del tiempo, Colectivo Calavera No Chilla. Centro Cultural Recoleta, Buenos Aires (19 artists).

Exhibitions abroad:

- Exhibition and Catalogue of 'When cows fly' - Argentina Guest of Honour at Bologna Children’s Book Fair. 2008. Bologna, Italy.

=== Conferences and other activities ===
- Book Presentation and signing at Feria Internacional del libro de Buenos Aires, 2012.
- “Atracción e inspiración. El libro álbum como promotor de la lectura”, organised by the Museo de Arte Contemporáneo Latinoamericano (MACLA, 2017).
- II Congreso Internacional de Literatura para Niños (Biblioteca Nacional. Buenos Aires, 2010).

=== Awards ===
- IBBY List of Honour (Switzerland)
- White Ravens (Germany), 2008. Book selected as one of the 250 best books of the world.
- 'Del amor nacen los ríos. Selected book by ALIJA, 1999.
- 'Hugo tiene Hambre' Norma Fundalectura Latin American Picture Book First Prize (Colombia)
- Banco del Libro de Essentials (Venezuela)
- Pregonero Award
- Latinoamerican Hormiguita Viajera Prize
