= Magomedkhan =

Magomedkhan (Russian: Магомедхан) is a Russian Dagestani masculine given name that may refer to:

- Magomedkhan Aratsilov (born 1951), Russian freestyle wrestler
- Volk Han (Magomedkhan Gamzatkhanov, born 1961), Dagestani-born Russian professional wrestler and later a mixed martial artist
