= Gail Sidonie Sobat =

Canadian writer and international presenter (born 1961)

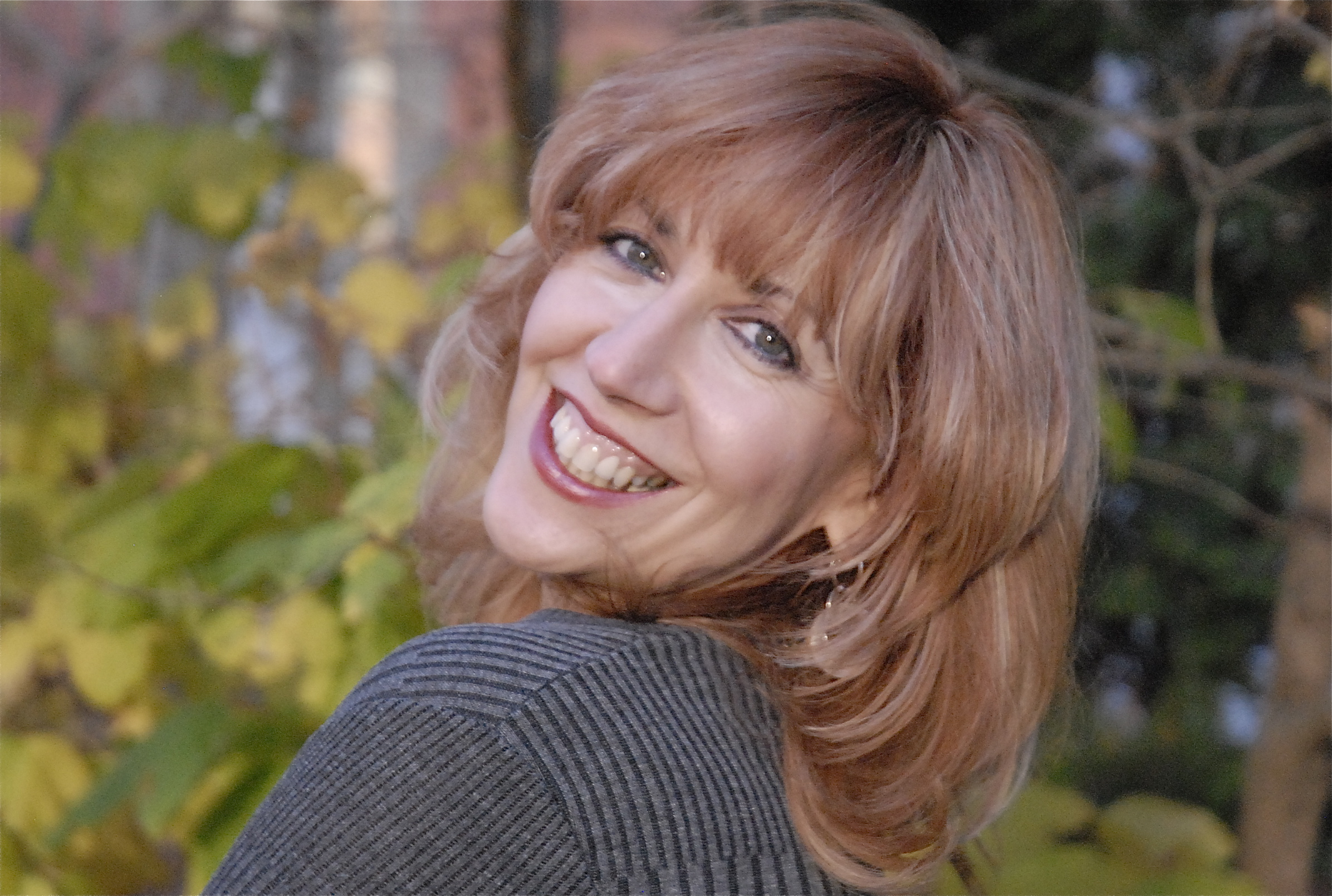
- Sobat in 2012
- Born: Calgary, Alberta, Canada
- Writing career
- Genre: Young adult fiction
- Website: gailsidoniesobat.com

Gail Sidonie Sobat (born January 3) is a Canadian writer, educator, singer and performer. She is the founder and coordinator of YouthWrite, a writing camp for children, a non-profit and charitable society. Her poetry and fiction, for adults and young adults, are known for her controversial themes. For 2015, Sobat was one of two writers in residence with the Metro Edmonton Federation of Libraries. She is also the founder of the Spoken Word Youth Choir in Edmonton.

== Early life ==
Sobat was born in Calgary, Alberta of first-generation Ukrainian-Canadian and Serb-Canadian parents. A striking Drumheller miner with socialist sympathies, her Ukrainian grandfather had been blacklisted by the RCMP in his youth; her Depression-era parents maintained socialist leanings throughout their lives.

She spent her early years in Drumheller, then Shouldice, and on the Blackfoot Indian Reservation, now Siksika Nation, near the hamlet of Gleichen. She attended kindergarten at the Old Sun Residential School, and later in St. Paul, near the Saddle Lake Cree Nation. Her father worked with Indian Affairs. Sobat completed Education and Arts degrees and a master's degree in English at the University of Alberta in Children's Literature, specializing in fantasy.

== Writing ==
Sobat's first publication was "Today She Was in Curlers," a short story published in Edges Literary Magazine in 1986. Sobat's books include the Young Adult/ New Adult novels Jamie's Got a Gun (a graphic novel illustrated by Spyder Yardley-Jones), Not With A Bang, Ingamald, A Winter's Tale, A Glass Darkly, Gravity Journal, Chance to Dance for You and a picture book, In the Graveyard, illustrated by artist, Spyder Yardley-Jones. She has also written two books of poetry, "How the Light is Spent" and Aortic Caprice, as well as a novel, The Book of Mary, for adult audiences.

== Career ==
Sobat taught in middle, secondary, and post-secondary schools. For the Legacy Project, a high school program addressing the gulf between aboriginal and non-aboriginal students, Sobat and her co-creators (Wally Diefenthaler and Kaye Steward) were named finalists for the Governor General Excellence in Teaching History Award.

Sobat founded YouthWrite in 1996, a multi-disciplinary camp for young writers. Courses offered include traditional poetry and fiction classes, but also drumming and words, movement and words, playwriting, journalism, illustration, writing for radio, screenwriting, and songwriting. The camp runs each January and July, and is overseen by Sobat, a team of supervisors, and a slate of professional authors and illustrators. 2015 marked the inaugural year for JustWrite, a writing camp for adults.

Sobat was adjunct professor in the University of Alberta Faculty of Education, and was the 2007 Canadian Authors Association (Alberta Chapter) Writer-in-Residence at the University of Alberta Bookstore. She has also been Writer-in-Residence at Queen's University and taught in Istanbul, Turkey at Ata College. Currently, she teaches creative writing and communications at MacEwan University in Edmonton, Alberta.

Sobat founded the Spoken Word Youth Choir, which first performed in September, 2007, as part of The Roar Spoken Word Festival in Edmonton. Later that year the group performed at the Edmonton Creative Cities Conference and the Edmonton Cultural Capital Gala. In 2008 they performed at the CANWRITE – Canadian Authors Association National Conference, and in 2009, at WordsWorth 2009 at Bragg Creek, and at several Edmonton venues. In 2010 the choir performed at the Calgary International Spoken Word Festival. Sobat has performed solo and with SWYC on stage and in public performances and presentations across Canada, in Doha, Qatar; Cincinnati, Ohio; Monteagle, Tennessee; Bern, Switzerland; Helsinki, Finland; and Hanoi, Vietnam.

== Awards ==
- Global TV Woman of Vision 2016–2017.
- Whistler Independent Book Awards Finalist for How the Light is Spent, 2016.
- CAA Fred Kerner Award Finalist for Jamie's Got a Gun, 2016.
- Moonbeam Award (Silver) for Jamie’s Got a Gun, 2014.
- Top Ten Best Graphic Novels of 2014, foreword Reviews, for Jamie’s Got a Gun, 2014.
- R. Ross Annett Award for Children's Literature, nomination for Not With a Bang, 2014.
- Orillia Public Library's Battle of the Books nomination for Gravity Journal, 2014.
- Edmonton Public Library's 2013 Alberta Readers' Choice long list nomination, Not With a Bang.
- Ontario Library Association's White Pine 2012 Honour Book: Chance to Dance for You.
- Moonbeam Award 2011 for Chance to Dance for You.
- Stellar Award 2011 nomination for Gravity Journal.
- Moonbeam Gold Award (IPPY) for Gravity Journal, 2009.
- Canadian Children's Book Centre Best Book for Gravity Journal, 2009.
- Ontario Library Association's White Pine Honour Book, Gravity Journal, 2009.
- Canadian Authors Association Exporting Alberta Award nomination, 2009.
- R. Ross Annett Award for Children's Literature, nomination for A Glass Darkly, 2008.
- Canadian Children's Book Centre Choice Award for A Glass Darkly, 2007.
- Gold IPPY (Independent Publisher Book Awards) for The Book of Mary, 2007.
- Ontario Library Association's White Pine Award, nomination for A Winter’s Tale, 2005.
- Canadian Children's Book Centre Choice Award for A Winter’s Tale, 2005.
- Canadian Children's Book Centre Choice Award for Ingamald, 2004.
- Jon Whyte Essay Competition, Honourable Mention, Writers' Guild of Alberta, 2003.
- Arts Award for Career Development, Alberta Heritage Scholarship, 2002.
- English Language Arts Council Award, 2000.
- Governor General's Award for Excellence in Teaching (Finalist, Co-recipient), 1996.
- The Writer's Block Short Story Competition, First Prize, 1994.
- Kalamalka New Writers Competition, poetry manuscript finalist, 1994.
- Hope Writers' Guild Poetry Contest, First Prize, 1993.
- Canadian Authors Association Short Story Competition, Honorable Mention, 1993.

== Bibliography ==
=== Adult fiction ===
- The Book of Mary - Sumach Press 2006
- Songs from This and That Country - Great Plains Publications 2025

=== Adult poetry ===
- Aortic Caprice - River Books 2003/2004
- How the Light is Spent - Wintergreen Studios Press 2013

=== Young adult/new adult fiction ===
- Ingamald - Spotted Cow Press 2001
- A Winter’s Tale - Great Plains Publications 2004
- A Glass Darkly - Great Plains Publications 2006
- Gravity Journal – Great Plains Publications 2008
- Chance to Dance for You - Great Plains Publications 2011
- In the Graveyard - Bryler Publications-Little Fish Books 2011
- Not With a Bang - Magpie Books 2012
- Jamie's Got a Gun - Great Plains Publications 2014

=== Criticism ===
- Sobat, Gail Sidonie (2014). "Not With a Bang, Neither With a Whimper: A fictional narrative about death and assisted suicide". In Hakola, Outi; Kivistö, Sari (eds.). Death in Literature. Cambridge Scholars Publishing. pp. 235–250. ISBN 978-1-4438-5994-3.
- "Why the prince has to bite it" in Mind Rain: Your Favorite Authors on Scott Westerfeld’s Uglies Series, edited by Scott Westerfeld (Benbella Books 2009).
- The thing about elves is..." in Secrets of the Dragon Riders: Your Favorite Authors on Christopher Paolini’s Inheritance Series, edited by James A. Owen (Benbella Books 2008).
- Sobat, Gail Sidonie (1996). "The Night in Her Own Country: The Heroine's Quest for Self in Ursula K. Le Guin's "The Tombs of Atuan"". Mythlore. 21 (3 (81)): 24–32. JSTOR 26812580.
- Sobat, Gail Sidonie (1995). "If the Ghost Be There, Then Am I Crazy?: An Examination of Ghosts in Virginia Hamilton's Sweet Whispers, Brother Rush and Toni Morrison's Beloved". Children's Literature Association Quarterly. 20 (4): 168–174. doi:10.1353/chq.0.0927. S2CID 144923688. Project MUSE 249508.

=== Educational writing ===
- Aboriginal Perspectives – English 10-1 and English 10–2, NorQuest Community College (2009).
- Teacher's Guide and Student Handbook, Mountain Ash Poetry Series (Rowan Books 2000).
