= Juan Pérez Nájera =

Spanish military personnel

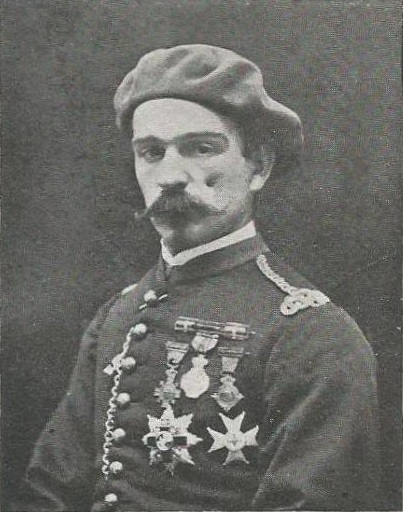
- Born: Juan Pérez Nájera; 1845; Castroviejo, Spain
- Died: 1939; Burjassot, Spain
- Occupation: entrepreneur
- Known for: military, politician
- Political party: Carlism

Juan José Pérez Nájera (1845–1939) was a Spanish politician and soldier. He has not risen to major honors either in politics or in the army, nonetheless in mostly theoretical legitimist troops he was nominated to the rank of a general. He remains a rather unique case of an individual who for 70 years was actively serving his political cause; from the late 1860s till the mid-1930s he supported Carlism. Though in the 1890s he aspired to the parliament, his political climax fell on the early 1930s; at the time he animated a somewhat dissident current within Traditionalism, later to develop into so-called carloctavismo. He demonstrated exceptional vitality: at the age of 68 he conceived a child, at the age of 72 he engaged in a street fight, and at the age of 89 he co-led a political faction.

== Family and youth ==
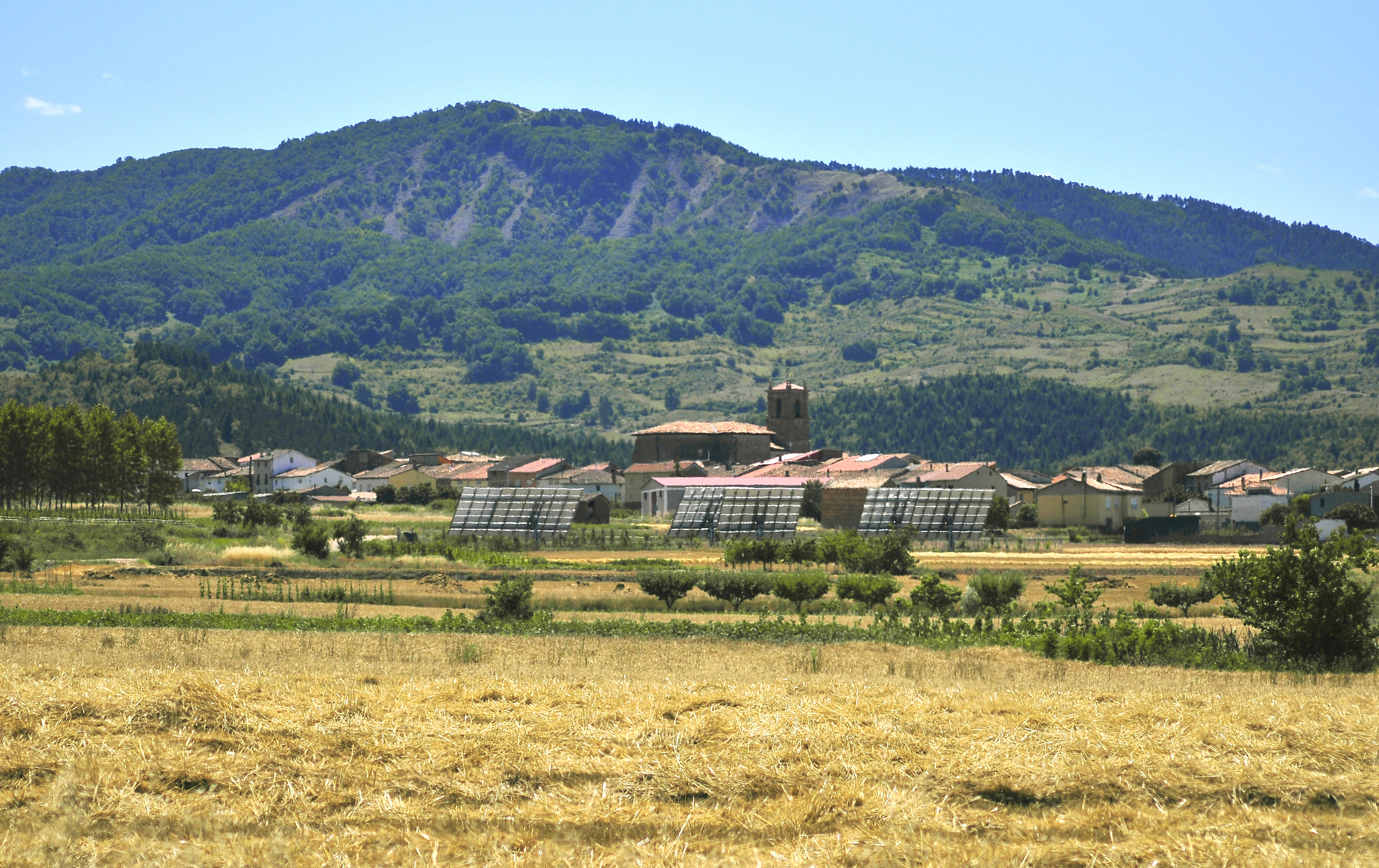
Santa Coloma at present

The sole Nájera's male ancestor identified is his father, Francisco Pérez Marín. In the mid-19th century he was related to the county of Nájera in Rioja Alta, in the province of Logroño (Old Castile). He was married to Benita Nájera (died 1901); none of the sources consulted provides any information about her. In the 1840s the couple lived in the village of Castroviejo; in the early 1850s they moved to the neighboring one of Santa Coloma, though they maintained some property in Castroviejo in the 1860s and 1870s. The family formed part of upper layer of the working class, since they counted among well-off farmers. One source lists Pérez Marín as belonging to the category of "honrados labradores", another one refers to him as "propietario bien acomodado". His agricultural economy was about stock-breeding, as in 1857 he was nominated visitador de ganaderías y cañadas, a livestock inspector, in the Nájera district. As late as in the late 1880s he was noted as engaged in petty legal disputes, related to his animal husbandry business. He rose to local prestige, in the 1850s serving as alcalde of Santa Coloma and juez municipal.

It is not clear how many children Francisco and Benita had; there are Pedro, Francisco and Manuel Pérez Nájera noted in Santa Coloma, while Pascual and Luciano Pérez Nájera lived at the time in Castroviejo, but it is not known whether they were José's siblings. Numerous sources claim that following his early education the teenage boy entered the religious path and joined a local seminary, probably in the early 1860s. However, there is no agreement as to details. Some point to the seminary in Calahorra, some to the one in Logroño and some mention few "seminarios conciliares de su provincia". He spent 6 years training to be a priest; in 1868 he abandoned the seminary, as according to later hagiographic accounts he decided to serve the Almighty not in a cassock and with a prayer book, but in a uniform and with a rifle.

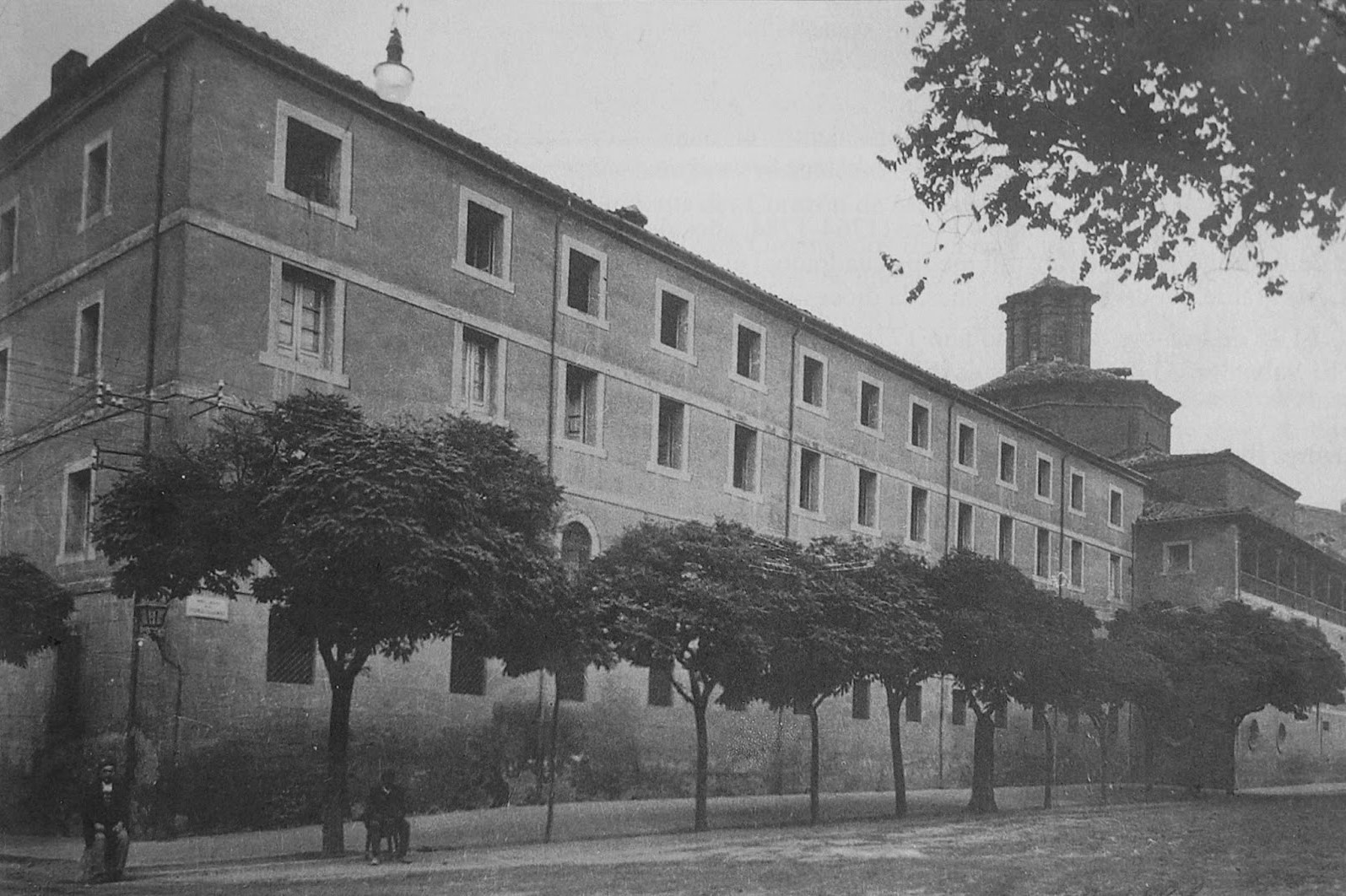
Logroño seminary

Private life of Nájera remains somewhat of a mystery. A later author claims that he "gained a family" during his spell in South America in the early 1880s, but provides no details. One confusing press note mentioned Dolores Lorente Puerta (1836–1904) as related, but according to another one she was rather Nájera's mother-in-law and his wife was named Pérez Lorente. One more source claims his wife - perhaps another one - died 22 days after his death, in 1939. Nájera had at least 4 children. Francisco died at the age of 12 months in 1914 and Bonifacio, in 1931 referred as "joven", was killed by the Republicans in 1938. Two daughters were noted as "señoritas" in the late 1910s; they were referred to as Ascensión and María Pérez Nájera, for some reason having both apellidos of their father. Ascensión died "en la primavera de la vida" in 1920. Maria reportedly took care of Nájera during his senility. Her further fate is unknown.

== Junior officer (1868-1874) ==
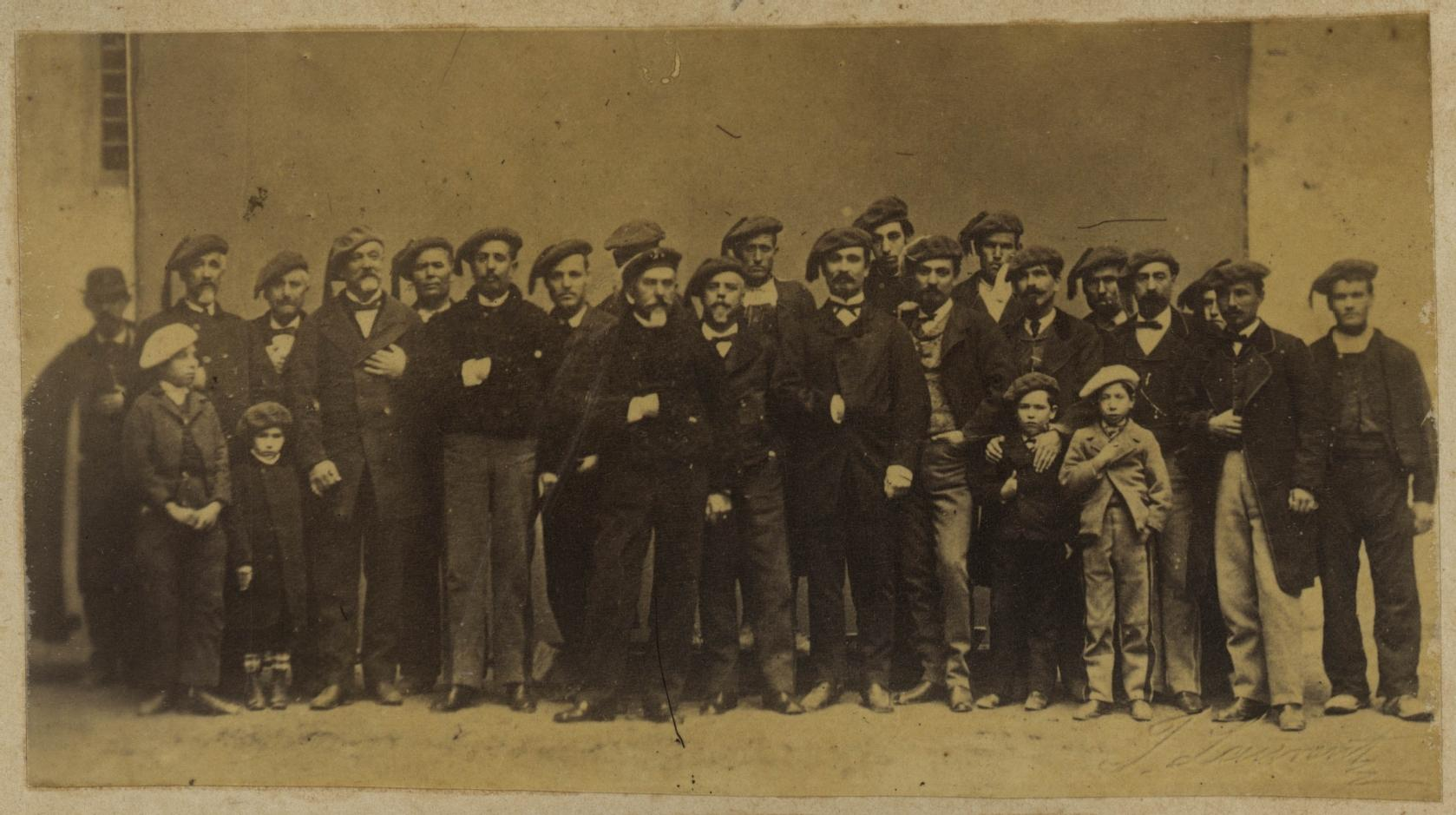
Carlist prisoners, 1869

Nájera's parents were Carlists, which in the early 1870s cost them property embargo, expropriation and then incarceration. The teenager inherited their Traditionalist outlook and following the Glorious Revolution he abandoned the seminary to fight Liberalism on battlefields. In the late 1860s Nájera entered conspiracy, yet sources provide confusing data. Some claim that in January 1869 he was captured by the Voluntarios de la Libertad militia in Corella and spent 3 weeks shuttled between various prisons in Navarre and Rioja before being set free; afterwards he engaged in the 1869 electoral campaign. However, also in early 1870 the press reported him incarcerated. Once liberated he was immersed in conspiracy and perhaps also combat during a minor rising called Escodada, territorially limited to Rioja and Vascongadas. He then fled to France, and was nominated alférez de infantería. Upon return to Spain in late 1870 Nájera resumed conspiring, first in Burgos and then in Zaragoza. Promoted to lieutenant, following outbreak of war in April 1872 he left Aragón and returned home.

Sometime in late spring 1872 Nájera crossed the Liberal-Carlist frontline at the Ebro and made it to Cegama. Some claim he was first incorporated into general staff of general Fulgencio Carasa, but most maintain that he was nominated ADC to general Antonio Lizárraga. He accompanied his superior during skirmishes in Sierra de Urbasa and was decorated, before in the summer of 1872 he again crossed to France. Back in early 1873 he initially went on with Lizárraga, but then assumed command of minor detachments and took part in combat in western Gipuzkoa; he got promoted to captain. Governmental press listed him as killed-in-action.

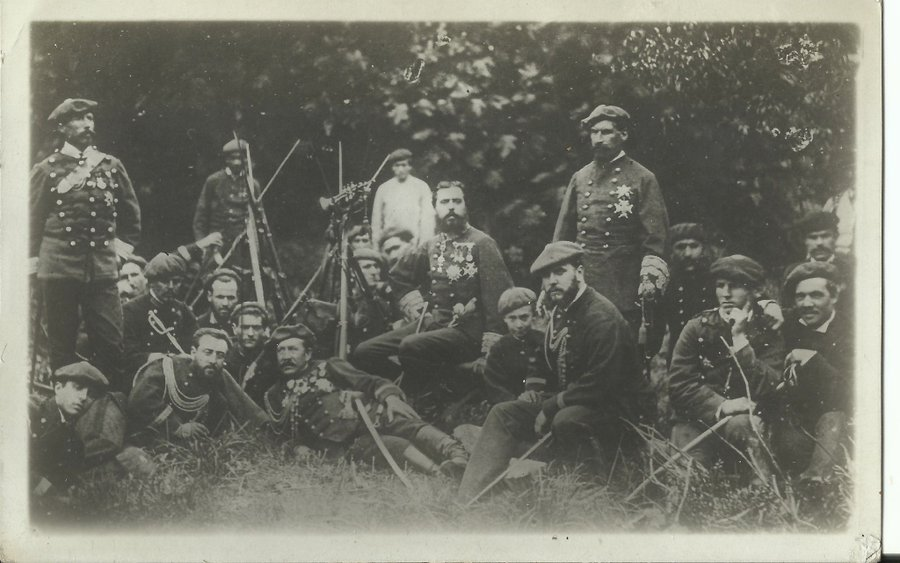
Carlos VII in Gipuzkoa, 1874

In late spring of 1873 Nájera assumed command of a scouting unit named Guías de Castilla, which fought in south-western Gipuzkoa (Azpeitia, Abalcisqueta, Astigarreta) and Rioja (Peñacerrada); he again got decorated. His first full-scale battle was in Navarre; during the engagement at Eraul he personally led a victorious bayonet charge on enemy artillery positions and was awarded the Laureada. He was then moved to the rear, entrusted with raising a battalion composed of Castilian volunteers from Palencia. According to some sources it was named Batallón de Cazadores 1.° del Cid, but other claim it was rather "quinto batallón de Castilla", named also 5. Cazadores de Palencia. Again, there is discrepancy as to Nájera's exact position. There are works which claim that from the onset he commanded the battalion, but other authors maintain that initially he was the deputy commander. Allegedly at this role he led the unit in early 1874 in Vizcaya, first during the action at Muñecas and then during extremely brutal fighting in Pucheta and San Pedro Abanto, both having been part of the Battle of Somorrostro, lost by the Carlists. His unit dispersed 2 enemy battalions of marine infantry; this produced Nájera's rising to major.

== Senior officer (1874-1876) ==
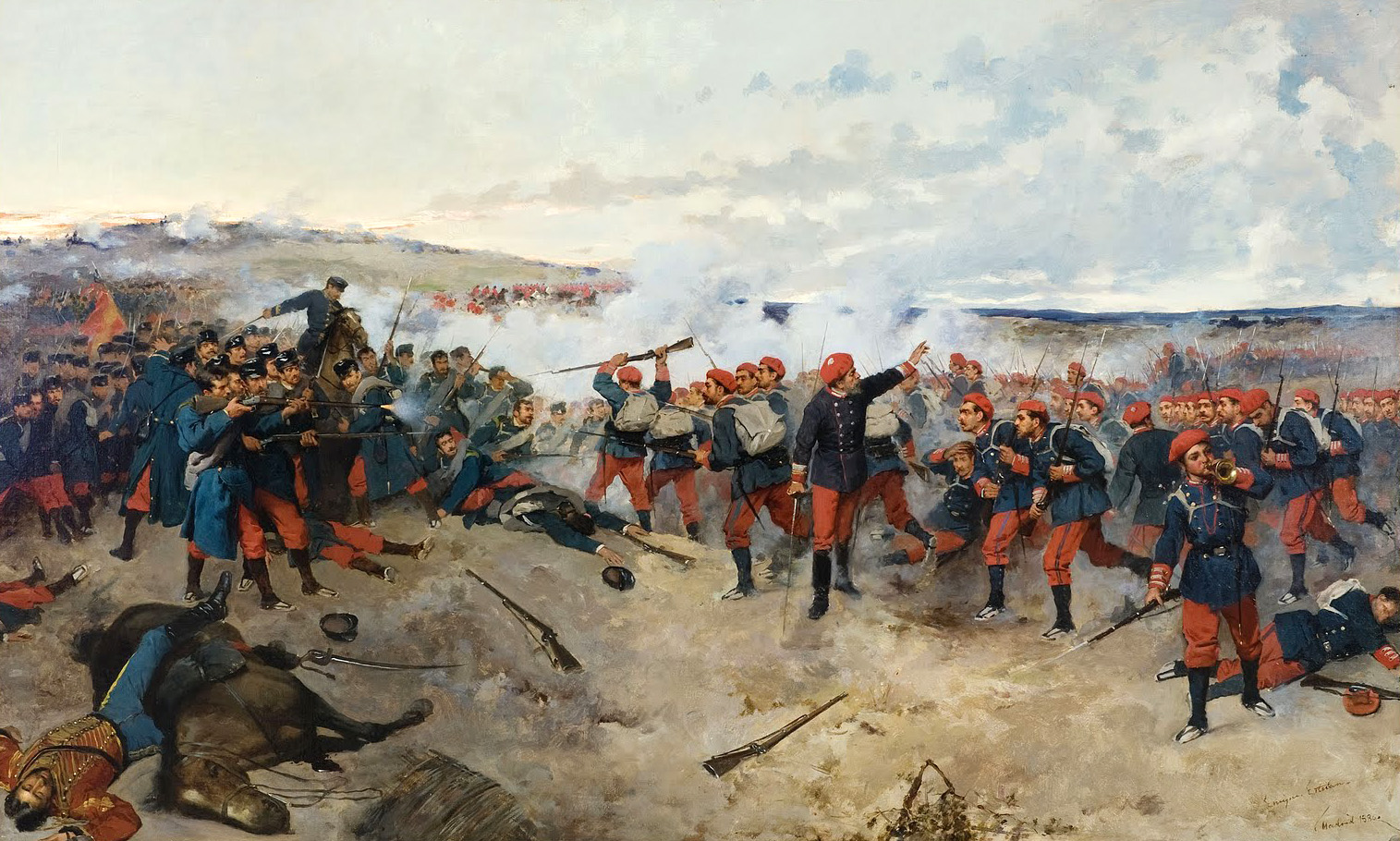
Battle of Lácar in art

Following the successful counter-offensive, mounted by troops of the Madrid government in Biscay, in the early summer of 1874 the frontline rolled back to Navarre. With his Palencian battalion (either as commander or as deputy commander) Nájera took part in victorious battles at Abárzuza (July) and Oteiza (August), and then in the undecided battle of Oyarzún (November). In the autumn of 1874 the Madrid administration declared him fugitive and deserter, since he had not reported as a conscript to obligatory military service; for a few years this would remain merely an empty gesture. At the time he was already leading few hundred men in army of the Estella-based government; in February 1875 Nájera commanded them during the victorious Battle of Lácar, which according to some authors resulted in his another promotion, namely to teniente coronel.

In the spring of 1875 Nájera's unit was moved to Álava, and according to some it was only at this point when he was appointed Jefe del Batallón de Cazadores de Palencia. For gallantry demonstrated during defensive action near Carrasquedo (June), at the border between the provinces of Álava and Burgos, where his unit kept their ground against 3 enemy battalions, Nájera got one more medal and according to some, his promotion to sub-colonel came only then. In late summer his unit kept fighting in the Burgos province, engaged in skirmishes at Arlanzón (August), before another enemy offensive forced them to withdraw to Navarre; defensive engagements at Mañeru and Santa Barbara followed.

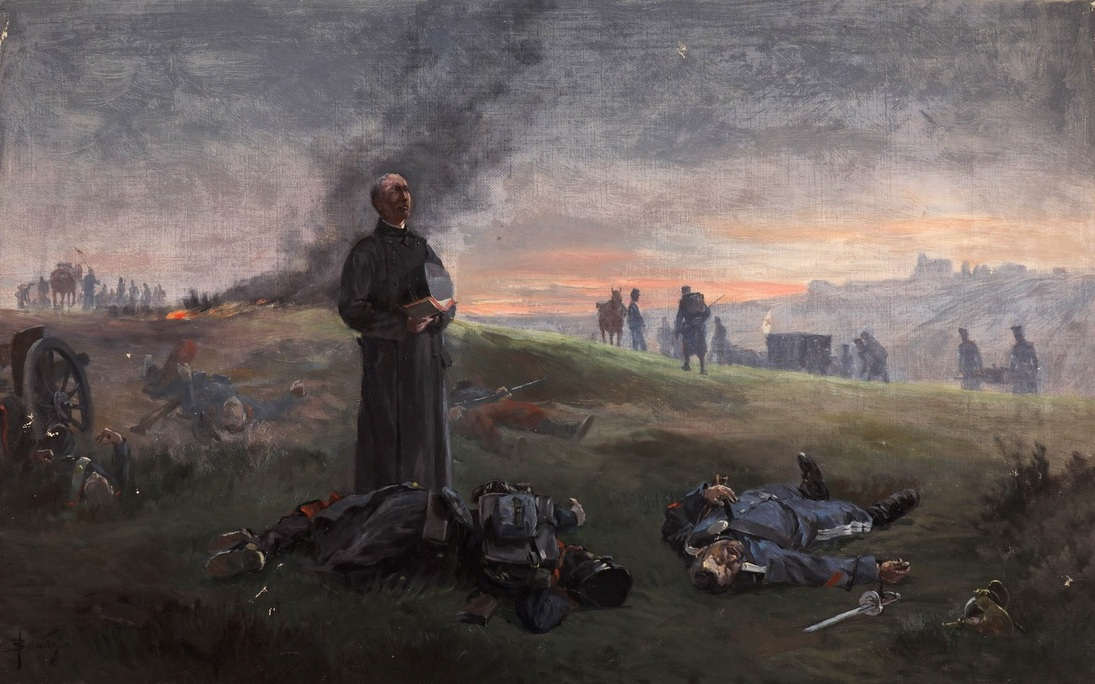
Third Carlist War in art

In Navarre in mid-1875 Nájera changed command; he abandoned the unit he had been leading for 2 years, the battalion of Palencian volunteers (depending upon sources numbered either 1. or 5.), and assumed leadership of another Castilian battalion (numbered 2.), named the Batallón de Cazadores de Arlanzón. At that point, in the autumn of 1875, both the Carlist state and the Carlist army were crumbling, heavily outnumbered by troops loyal to Madrid. Nájera's engagements were reduced to defensive actions in northern Navarre, the last Carlist stronghold; in January 1876 he defended the sector next to the Pyrenean frontier with France around the city of Vera de Bidasoa. In February he commanded whatever troops remained under his command trying to resist enemy advance during fighting at Peña Plata and Palomeras de Echalar. His last task was ensuring that the claimant Carlos VII could safely withdraw to France; he moved to the Roncesvalles sector and performed gendarmerie role, engaged in combat against mutinous Carlist sub-units which were about to surrender. Two days before his king crossed the frontier, he promoted Nájera to full colonel and decorated him with another honor. Following 4 years of almost continuous wartime engagement, on the last day of February 1876 Nájera crossed to France and laid down his arms.

== In transition (1876-1888) ==
departament Cerro Largo, Uruguay

A monographic work on Carlist exile in France does not mention Nájera. According to a hagiographic source the Madrid government offered Nájera the rank of a colonel, which he refused claiming that "the standard might be abandoned, but never betrayed". Another source claims the opposite, namely that upon return from brief exile he was persecuted, which triggered his decision to move overseas. He left Europe for America either in late 1876 or in early 1877; other motives quoted are that he sought better luck or that he acted upon instructions of his king, who directed him towards Cuba. However, there is no confirmation that Nájera has ever arrived in the Caribbean; it is known that in 1883 he resided in Cerro Largo in Uruguay and - either before or after - in Brazil. Sources agree that in America Nájera was engaged in some sort of business; one author claims he was dedicated to commerce and another, of poor credibility, asserts that in the New World he "made a fortune". He returned to Spain no later than in 1885, reportedly because he believed that upon death of Alfonso XII, Carlos VII would again reach for the throne, even it takes another war.

Back in his native Rioja, in 1886 in Logroño Nájera was detained as a deserter, the charge related to his 1874 no-show in the governmental army. It is not clear how much time he spent behind bars, though sources agree that he paid his way off military service; some claim he was set free in 1887, and some point rather to 1888. Afterwards he settled in Madrid, where he would permanently reside during the following 5 decades; he would visit Castroviejo and Santa Coloma only during the summer periods. It remains obscure what he was doing for a living, e.g. whether he lived off the fortune made in America or retained some property in Rioja. In the 1890s he set up a customs agency, with offices in Irún and Madrid. At later stages he was also engaged in exploration of salt ponds near Tortosa, a business held jointly with another Carlist veteran Felipe de Sabater de Prat, though it would soon turn into a legal conflict over property, with juridical proceedings going on until the mid-1910s.

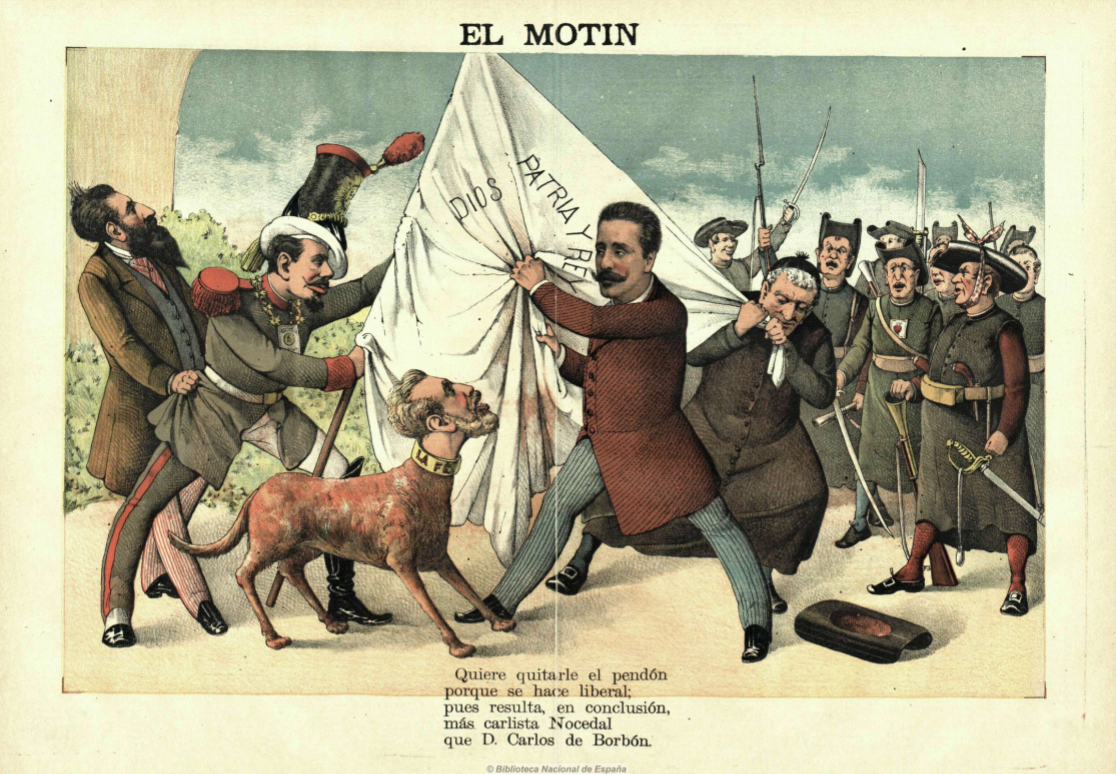
Integrist breakup in liberal cartoon

In the late 1880s Traditionalism was increasingly divided between followers of the claimant, Carlos VII, and supporters of the key party theorist and de facto political leader, Ramón Nocedal, who intended to de-emphasize dynastical threads in favor of religious intransigence. Nájera counted among the Nocedalistas and remained a subscriber of their flagship newspaper, El Siglo Futuro. However, when the controversy exploded into an open showdown, and when the Nocedalistas broke away to form a new current, known as Integrism, Nájera did not follow suit. Lambasting "errores y extravíos" he cancelled the subscription and in an open letter, published in the press, referred contemptuously to "a certain Ramón Nocedal". Liberal press reported the conflict, including the stand taken by Nájera, with sheer delight.

== Madrid: second row (1888-1898) ==
Carlist standard

Though merely in his mid-40s, in the late 1880s Nájera appeared at Carlist meetings next to Traditionalist leaders; this was the case e.g. during a banquet staged in Madrid to declare loyalty to the claimant Carlos VII and castigate the breakaways, when he was sitting next to Jefé Delagado, Marqués de Cerralbo. In 1892 he published in legitimist press his brief wartime account. During the 1893 electoral campaign to the lower chamber of the Cortes he stood in his native Torecilla-Nájera district as one of 29 Carlist candidates nationwide. His only rival was a liberal Riojan cacique Lorenzo Codes García, Marqués del Romeral. For Nájera the campaign ended disastrously; Romeral got 8 times more votes (5,659 vs. 714), even though in some locations, like Badarán, Nájera was more popular; he lost even in his native villages of Castroviejo and Santa Coloma. Following this experience, Nájera would never again join any electoral race.

In 1894 the claimant promoted Nájera to the rank of general de brigada, a purely theoretical nomination since at the time there was neither a Carlist army nor even a Carlist paramilitary organization operational. This allowed him to bask in more prestige, but did not translate into any power within the party structures; his only official position known was president of "junta del distrito" in Badarán. He entered neither provincial Madrid nor regional Castilian executive and did not count among the Traditionalist decision-makers; a large academic historiographic monograph on jefatura of Marqués de Cerralbo, covering the 1890s and the 1900s, mentions Nájera only in relation to his failed Cortes bid. In the mid-1890s his only activity identified was very sporadically publishing belligerent notes in the flagship Carlist newspaper, El Correo Español, e.g. against the Anglican bishop Juan Bautista Cabrera Ibarz.

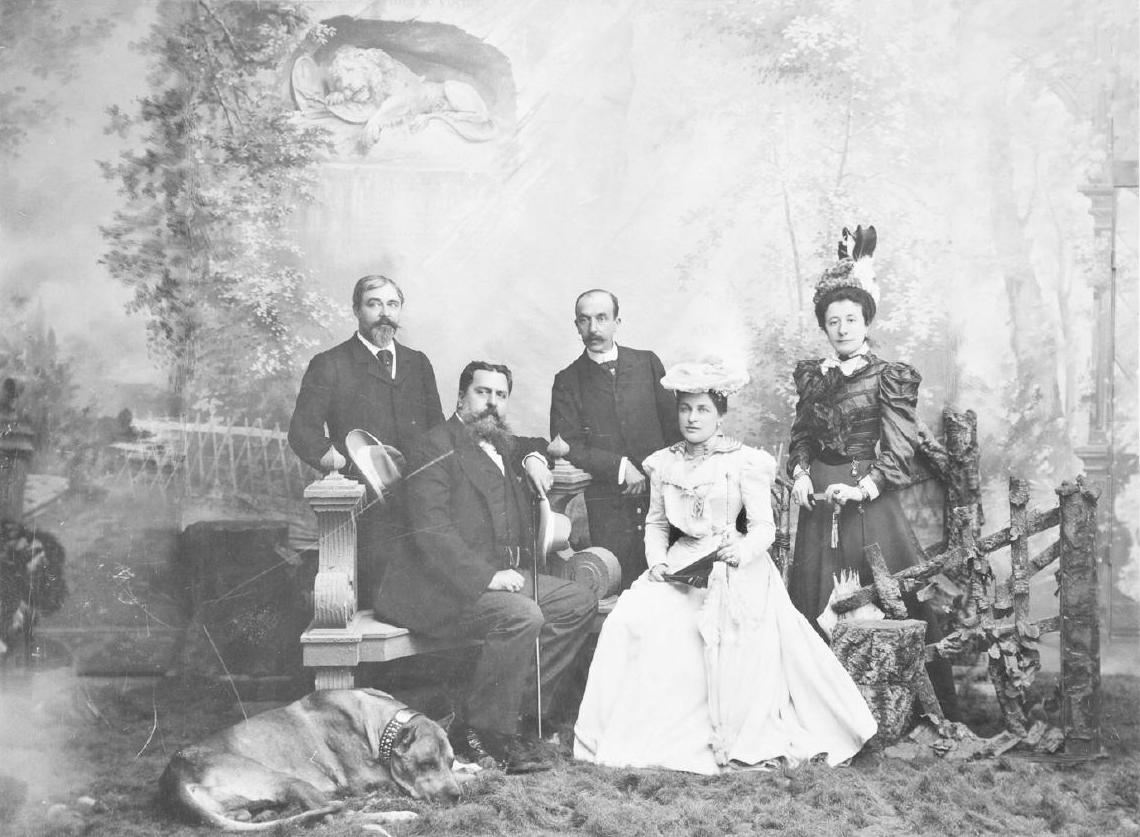
Carlos VII, Cerralbo, and others, 1895

In the late 1890s the Carlist organization was gearing up towards another violent action, be it a coup or a rising; the intention was to take advantage of national uproar following disastrous defeat in war against the United States in 1898. There is relatively little known of this conspiracy, which eventually boiled down to unrest - unauthorized by the claimant - in few single cities. According to a much later information provided by a Carlist author who knew Nájera personally, the latter took part in preparations to the rising, yet present-day scholars who tried to approach the subject did not mention him among the protagonists. Carlist moguls who were pushing for action regardless of the royal approval or merely those who failed to prevent the attempts fell in disregard; Cerralbo was dismissed and replaced by Matias Barrio y Mier. However, none of the sources consulted claims the royal wrath affected also Nájera.

== Madrid: first row (1898-1919) ==
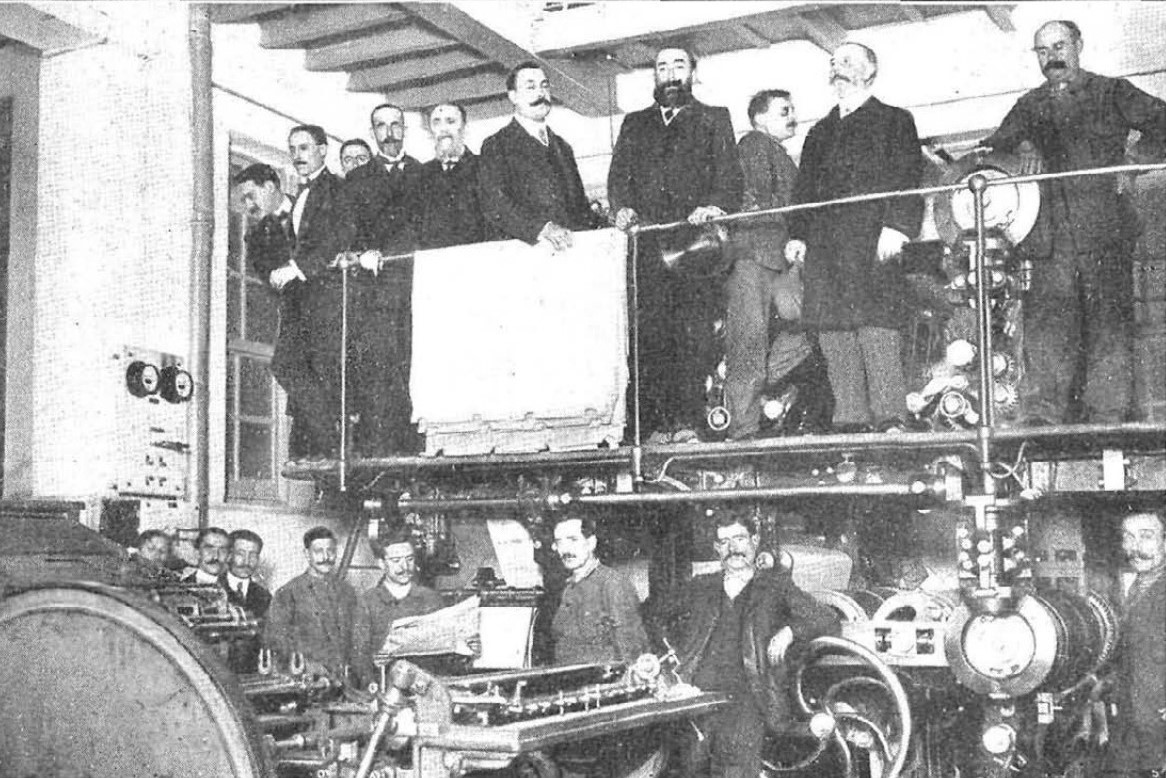
opening of Casa Tradicionalista, 1912

In the early 20th century the press started to publish first notes about Nájera's health problems, usually when they were adversely affecting his presence on local party rallies in Madrid, e.g. in 1903 or 1904. However, every some time he was mentioned as taking part in various veladas in the capital, e.g. in 1905, 1907, 1908 or 1909; on exceptional basis he attended also Traditionalist events organized elsewhere, e.g. in Barcelona. In 1907 he was for the first time noted as vice-president of the Madrid círculo. By the end of the decade, as vice-president but also basking in his prestige of a general, he engaged in electoral campaigns of Carlist candidates running for the Cortes, e.g. in 1908 travelling to the Navarrese Tudela to support Lorenzo Sáenz y Fernández Cortina. In 1909 he entered an internal Comisión Gestora, a committee entrusted with collecting money and purchase of premises supposed to host Casa de los Tradicionalistas, the future Carlist political centre in Madrid. The project was crowned with success in 1912 and in 1913 Nájera assumed presidency of Junta Directiva of Casa de los Tradicionalistas. He was also in collective presidency of some events and featured prominently in propaganda prints, e.g. earning 5 pages in a 1912 book on Carlist heroes of the past. Since the mid-1910s both his young daughters, Ascensión and María, were very active in Madrid, performing during Traditionalist literary and artistic evenings.

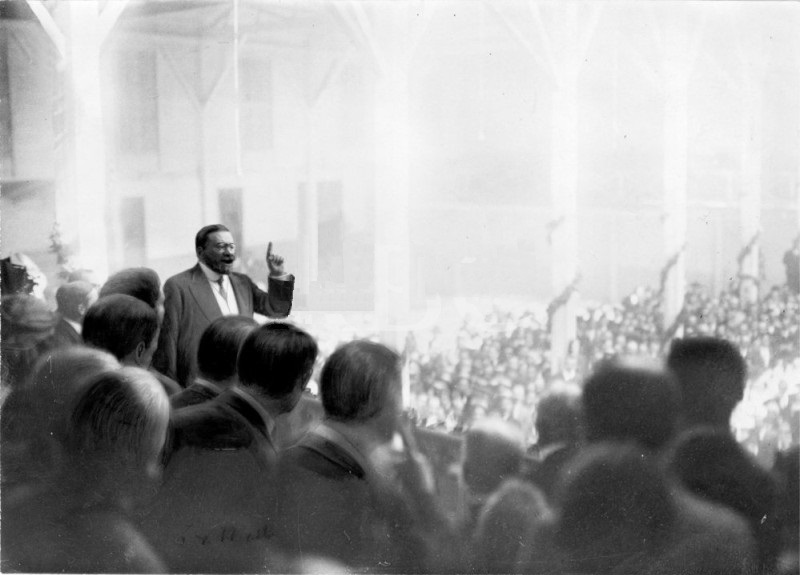
de Mella speaking, 1916

Since 1909 Carlism was again suffering from internal conflict, this time between the new claimant Don Jaime and the chief party theorist and sort of celebrity, Juan Vázquez de Mella, with the party leader Cerralbo somewhat leaning towards the latter. There were different points of contention: weight of the dynastic ingredient, party strategy of alliances, position versus belligerent parties during the Great War, and last but not least, clearly personal rivalry. Like de Mella and unlike the Francophile claimant, Nájera was an outspoken Germanophile. However, in all other issues he sided with Jaime III; he was also on increasingly poor terms with Cerralbo. Since the mid-1910s he formed the core of a strong Madrid-based anti-Mellista group, which included also Lorenzo Sáenz y Fernandez Cortina, Guillermo Izaga Ojembarrena, and Emilio Dean Berro. The conflict was very personal, bitter and venomous; on individual basis it climaxed in a scene which scandalized the capital: during a street encounter between Nájera and de Mella they first "exchanged brief and energetic comments", then the 72-year-old Nájera slapped the 56-year-old de Mella, then the latter responded with a cane, and eventually it was passers-by who separated the two. On political basis the conflict climaxed in early 1919; during a brief showdown de Mella tried to win the party over Don Jaime, failed and broke away to lead his own current of Traditionalism, known as Mellismo.

== Jaimista (1919-1929) ==
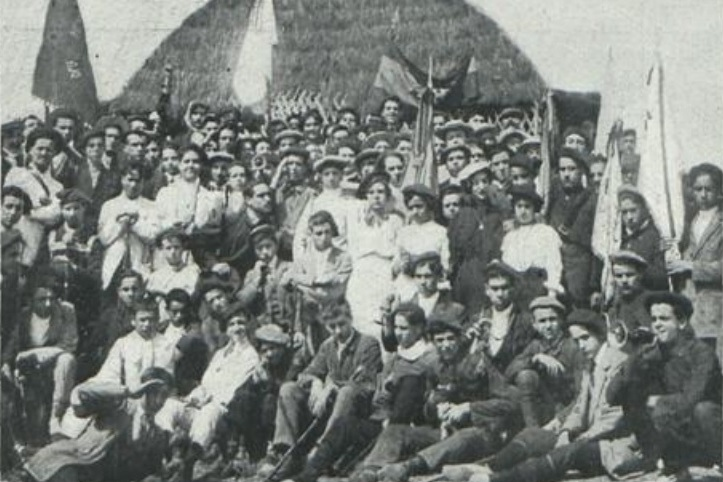
early Requeté

Nájera tried to mobilize support for the claimant when in 1919 he launched a Madrid weekly El Alerta, yet there is no information on its lifetime. He participated in events, staged in the capital to demonstrate loyalty to Don Jaime. When in late 1919 the latter called a grand assembly, supposed to set direction for the future and known as Magna Junta de Biarritz, Nájera did not attend, though he sent his letter of adhesion and identified with those gathered. He featured as sort of a patriarch, an example of fidelity, who for half a century has been supporting the cause; El Correo Español printed excerpts from his statements next to its vignette. Santa Coloma declared him hijo predilecto y adoptivo, an honorary citizen.

Carlist structures included a youth branch named Requeté, ranging from leisure groupings to urban hit-squads. A bid to turn them into paramilitary, attempted by Joaquín Llorens, failed, and because of political differences the relations between Llorens and Don Jaime became thorny. In 1920 the claimant nominated Nájera the new leader; titled Jefe General de los Requetés he received another promotion, from brigadier general to teniente general. There is very little known about Nájera's leadership. In his manifesto he stressed peaceful threads when noting that "luchamos hoy en la organización, en la prensa, en la tribuna, en el mitín", yet he warned that as "the revolution keeps advancing", the militants must be ready for a moment when the liberal regime breaks down under its own ineptitude. His specific actions, however, seem calibrated towards the veterans rather than towards the youth, e.g. when in 1920 he tried to organize an assembly of ex-combatants.

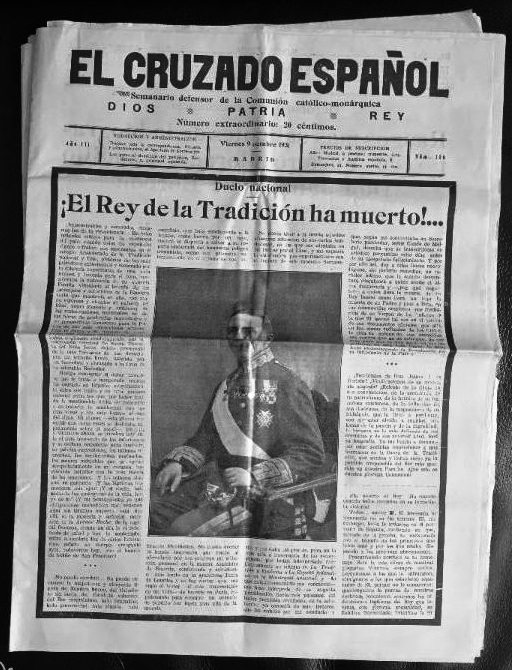
El Cruzado Español

The early 1920s marked the period when Nájera enjoyed most prestige with Carlism; he co-presided over Martires de la Tradición and during another grand assembly in Zaragoza, toured Levante and Catalonia, represented Don Jaime at various events and was even mocked by hostile newspapers. However, he failed to prevent ongoing decay of Requeté. When in 1922 Don Jaime issued instructions to turn the branch into "action groups", he turned not to Nájera but to the party leader, Marqués de Villores. No source mentions Nájera as related to Requeté further on, though there is neither any which claims he was formally released as its leader.

In 1924 the 79-year-old fell victim to a traffic accident, yet once again he demonstrated enormous vitality and recovered. Also in 1924 he was decorated with the highest Carlist honor, Orden de la Legitimidad Proscrita. However, in the mid-1920s Nájera disappeared almost entirely from the public eye, sporadically noted only on societé columns; no source claims he has engaged in any of the primoderiverista institutions. He remained on excellent terms with the party leader for New Castile (of which Madrid formed part), Emilio Deán, and since 1929 with the following one, Lorenzó Fernandez de la Cortina. In the late 1920s this group launched a new periodical supposed to be successor to the defunct El Correo Español, titled El Cruzado Español.

== Cruzadista (1929-1939) ==
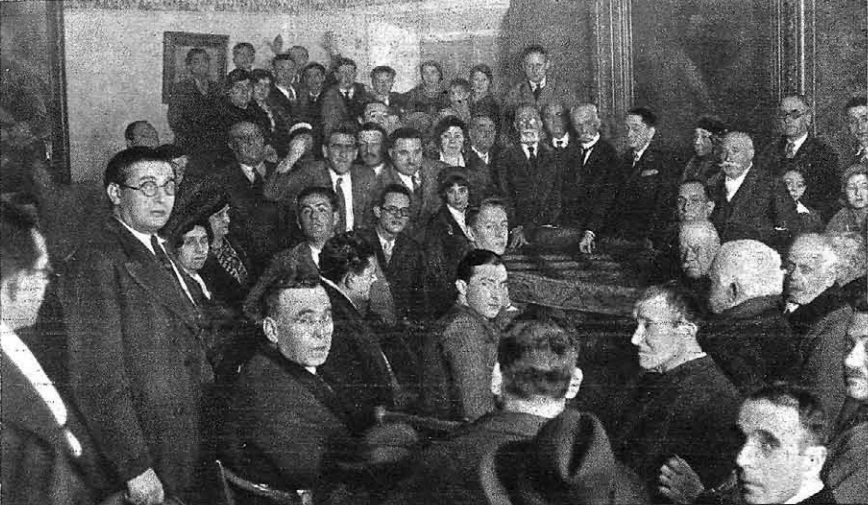
Nájera at Cruzadista meeting, 1933

El Cruzado from the onset hailed Nájera as a distinguished veteran of the cause. When following the fall of Primo political life in Spain was resumed, in 1930 the 85-year-old travelled as far as to Villareal, to speak at the local party event. The claimant Jaime III died in 1931; in Madrid Nájera co-presided over the funeral ceremony, in the press noted as "invicto general Nájera". The claim was assumed by Don Jaime's successor, the childless octogenarian Don Alfonso Carlos, which facilitated re-admission to Carlism of the Integristas and the Mellistas. Nájera and the circle of Madrid leaders were appalled to see the former breakaways assuming high positions in the party; "dimisiones in cascada" followed, while Nájera refused to take a seat in the new national executive, Junta Suprema Tradicionalista.

Another line of conflict proved more consequential. Rumors circulated that Don Alfonso Carlos sought understanding with the Alfonsist branch. The Madrid leaders behind El Cruzado were the most outspoken opponents of reconciliation; their quadrilátero dirigente was composed of Nájera, Cora, Belaústegui and Saenz. In early 1932 Nájera headed a group of Cruzadistas who published an open letter, directed to their new king, and an accompanying manifesto. Given it was certain that the Carlist dynasty would extinguish, in polite yet firm terms they asked that Don Alfonso Carlos nominates his successor. The claimant received some signatories in Toulouse, though he refused to bow to any pressure; as the Cruzadistas did not intend to step back, in April he disauthorised the periodical. The conflict escalated when in June 1932 Nájera published a text, headlined ¿Disciplina carlista? ¡Si!... ¿Disciplina cesarista? ¡¡No!! Both sides preferred not to burn the bridges; the 1933 luxury album celebrating 100 years of Carlism dedicated 2 pages to Nájera, "el general de más edad superviviente", and in 1934 he received a parade of 900 requetés in Zumarraga. However, as the Cruzadistas refused to back down, eventually Don Alfonso Carlos expulsed them.

Nájera, who remained faithful during secessions of 1888 and 1919, for the first time found himself beyond loyalty to the claimant. The expulsed formed a group under a challenging name "Núcleo de la Lealtad" and started to advance Don Carlos Pio as their candidate to the throne. Some authors claim that Nájera presided over a grand assembly in Zaragoza, organized by the rebels to select a new king, but other sources do not confirm this. Some Cruzadistas, including Nájera, were nearing fascistoid groups. He has always been known as a devoted café-goer; in the mid-1930s in Café del Norte he was mixing with the likes of Ramiro Ledesma Ramos. His fate afterwards is barely known. One source claims that in November 1936 with his daughter and perhaps wife the 91-year-old moved to Burjassot, possibly escaping hardships of life in frontline-located Madrid. It is not clear whether he learnt that his only remaining son had been killed in the capital in 1938. He died few months before the end of the civil war.

== See also ==
- Carlism
- Traditionalism (Spain)
- Carloctavismo
