= Vasile Țigănaș =

Romanian wrestler

Personal information
- Nationality: Romanian
- Born: 2 January 1951 (age 75)

Sport
- Sport: Wrestling

Vasile Țigănaș (born 2 January 1951) is a Romanian wrestler. He competed in the men's freestyle 82 kg at the 1980 Summer Olympics, where he got fourth place.
