= Ismail Abilov =

Bulgarian freestyle wrestler

Personal information
- Born: 9 June 1951 (age 75) Lopushna, Bulgaria

Sport
- Sport: Freestyle wrestling
Medal record
Representing Bulgaria
Olympic Games
Gold medal – first place	1980 Moscow	82 kg
World Championships
Silver medal – second place	1974 Istanbul	90 kg
Silver medal – second place	1975 Minsk	82 kg
Bronze medal – third place	1973 Teheran	82 kg
European Championships
Gold medal – first place	1975 Ludwigshafen	82 kg
Gold medal – first place	1977 Bursa	82 kg
Gold medal – first place	1980 Prievidza	82 kg
Summer Universiade
Bronze medal – third place	1977 Sofia	82 kg

Ismail Abilov-Nizamoğlu (Bulgarian: Исмаил Абилов, born 9 June 1951) is a Bulgarian freestyle wrestler and Olympic champion.

He became Olympic champion in 1980 in the freestyle middleweight class.

He has received two silver medals and one bronze medal at the FILA Wrestling World Championships.

Ismail Abilov-Nizamoğlu has received three gold medals and one silver medal at the European Wrestling Championships (at the 1977 European Wrestling Championship he defeated the 1975 World Champion and two-time Olimpic Bronze Medalist Adolf Seger).

== Olympic results ==
1980 (as a Men's freestyle 82 kg)

Round	Opponent	Сountry	Results	Penalties	Time
1	Sören Claeson	(Sweden)	Won by Fall (TF)	0	4:01
2	Vasile Ţigănaş	(Romania)	Won by Fall (TF)	0	0:46
3	Günter Busarello	(Austria)	Won by Fall (TF)	0	7:25
4	Abdula Memedi	(Socialist Federal Republic of Yugoslavia)	Won by Fall (TF)	0	4:19
5	Magomedkhan Aratsilov	(Soviet Union)	Won by Points (8-4)	1
Final	István Kovács	(Hungary)	Won by Fall (TF)	0	1:48
