= Santa Coloma, La Rioja =

Santa Coloma
- Municipality
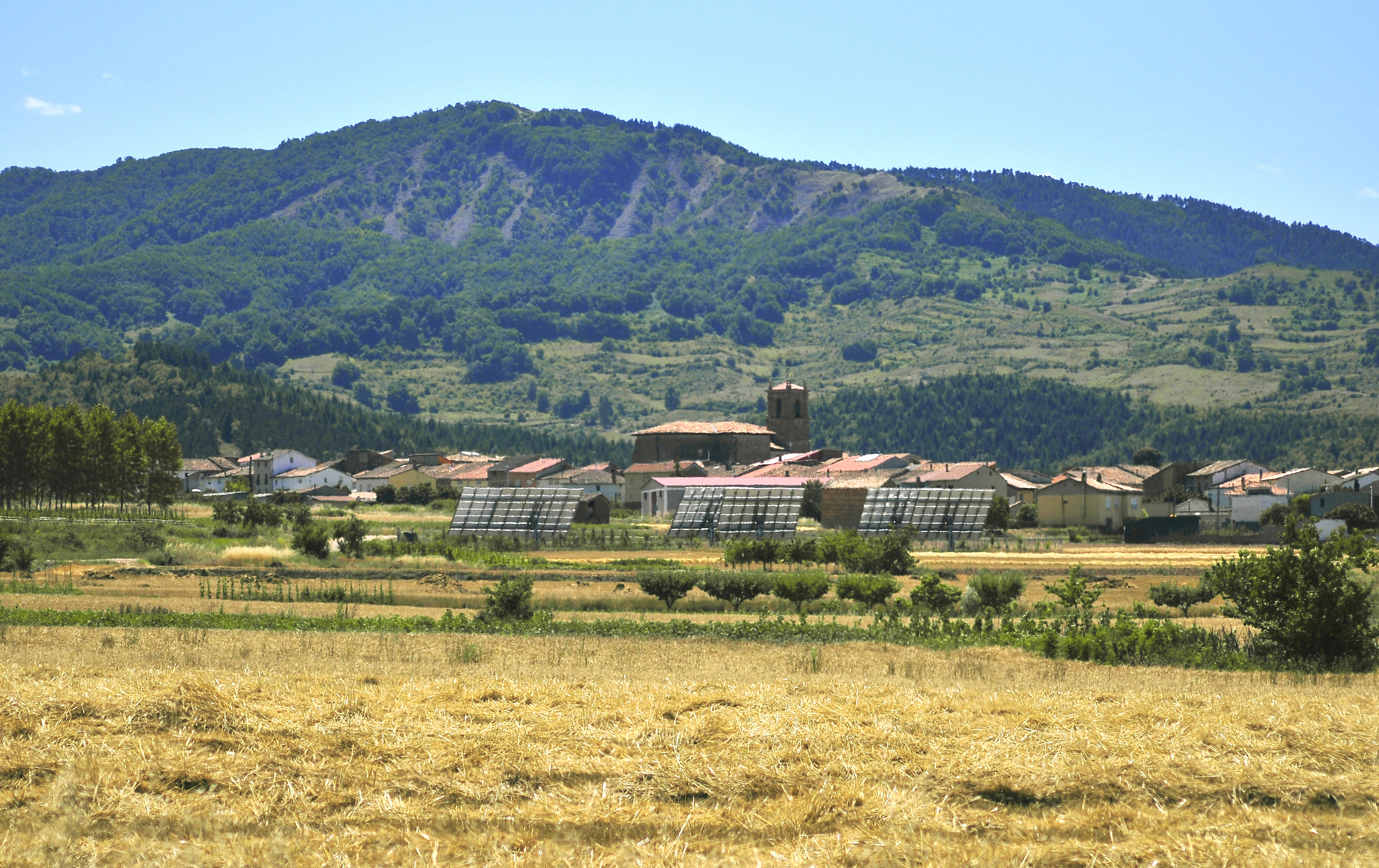
- Skyline of Santa Coloma

- Flag Coat of arms

- Location within La Rioja, Spain Location within Spain
- Coordinates: 42°22′01″N 2°39′20″W
- Country: Spain
- Autonomous community: La Rioja
- Comarca: Nájera

Government
  - Mayor: Natividad García Gutiérrez (PP)

Area
  - Total: 20.24 km^{2} (7.81 sq mi)
- Elevation: 762 m (2,500 ft)

Population (2025-01-01)
  - Total: 104
- Demonym(s): colomino, na
- Postal code: 26315
- Website: Official website

Santa Coloma is a village in the province and autonomous community of La Rioja, Spain. The municipality covers an area of 20.24 square kilometres (7.81 sq mi) and as of 2011 had a population of 127 people.

== Notable people ==
- Juan Pérez Najera (1845-1939), military and politician
