= Chimidiin Gochoosüren =

Mongolian wrestler (born 1953)

Personal information
- Nationality: Mongolian
- Born: 13 April 1953 (age 73) Khotont, Mongolia

Sport
- Sport: Wrestling
Medal record
Men's freestyle wrestling
Representing Mongolia
Asian Games
Silver medal – second place	1978 Bangkok	90 kg

Chimidiin Gochoosüren (born 13 April 1953) is a Mongolian wrestler. He competed in the men's freestyle 82 kg at the 1976 Summer Olympics.
