= YouthWrite =

Writing camp in Alberta, Canada

YouthWrite is an Alberta-based writing camp for young people. It bills itself as a "camp for kids who love to write... just about anything." Founded in 1996 by Gail Sidonie Sobat, it has been held at Kamp Kiwanis near Bragg Creek, Alberta and the Bennett Centre in Edmonton, Alberta.

Some notable past instructors include Todd Babiak, Ted Bishop, Anita Daher, Maria Dunn, Martyn Godfrey, Myrna Kostash, Clem Martini, Anna Marie Sewell, Vern Thiessen, Thomas Trofimuk, Terry Trueman, Sheri-D Wilson, and Spyder Yardley-Jones.

The Spoken Word Youth Choir was founded at YouthWrite 2007.
