= Abdula Memedi =

Yugoslav wrestler (born 1952)

Personal information
- Nationality: Yugoslav
- Born: 24 April 1952 (age 74)

Sport
- Sport: Wrestling

Abdula Memedi (born 24 April 1952) is a Yugoslav wrestler. He competed in the men's freestyle 82 kg at the 1980 Summer Olympics.
