= Robert Hogg (poet) =

Canadian poet (1942–2022)

- Born: March 26, 1942 Edmonton, Alberta, Canada
- Died: November 13, 2022 (aged 80) Ottawa, Ontario, Canada
- Occupation: Poet
- Language: English

Robert Hogg (March 26, 1942 – November 13, 2022) was a Canadian poet, critic, professor, and organic farmer.

== Biography ==
Born in Edmonton, Alberta, on March 26, 1942, Robert Hogg studied English and Creative Writing at the University of British Columbia where he co-edited important Canadian little magazine TISH. He studied at SUNY Buffalo (under Charles Olson) and taught at Carleton University. He completed a Ph.D. on the works of Charles Olson. He died at age 80 on November 13, 2022, in Ottawa.

== Writing ==
His poetry is collected in New Wave Canada (1966), edited by Raymond Souster and published by Contact Press, and the Oxford University Press anthology, Modern Canadian Verse (1967), edited by A.J.M. Smith. He published books of poetry and poetics with Oyez Press, Coach House Press, Black Moss Press, ECW Press, Talonbooks, and chapbooks with above/ground press, battleaxe press, and hawkweed press. In 1987, Hogg's poem "Classic Lines" was published in Edges Literary Magazine.

His poetry has been reviewed in Canadian and International journals, including Poetry and Open Letter. Douglas Barbour described Hogg's first book as "one of the most powerful of its year." His 1978 collection, Of Light, included dust jacket blurbs from Victor Coleman, Robert Creeley, and Robert Duncan, with Duncan describing the book as "one of the very few radiantly present books I have read." Hogg has been profiled on CBC Radio and in the Globe and Mail.

Hogg also founded and operated Mountain Path organics.

== Publications ==
- The Connexions. Berkeley CA: Oyez Press, 1966.
- Standing Back. Toronto: Coach House Press, 1972.
- Of Light. Toronto: Coach House Press, 1978.
- Heat Lightning. Windsor ON: Black Moss Press, 1986.
- There Is No Falling. Toronto: ECW Press, 1993.
- An English Canadian Poetics: The Confederation Poets – Vol. 1. Ed. Vancouver: Talonbooks, 2009.
- From Lamentations. Ottawa: above/ground Press, 2012.
- From Lamentations. 2nd Expanded ed. Ottawa: above/ground Press, 2016.
- Ranch Days—for Ed Dorn. Ottawa: battleaxe press, 2019.
- Ranch Days—The McIntosh. Kemptville: hawkweed press, 2019.
- Question. New Westminster, BC: pagefiftyone, 2021.
- A Quiet Affair: Vancouver '63. BC: Trainwreck Press, 2021.
- From Each Forthcoming. Ottawa: above/ground press, 2021.
- The Red Menace. Mountain, ON: Hogwallow Press, 2021.
- Apothegms. Ottawa: Apt. 9 Press, 2021.
- The Cold Light of Morning. Toronto/Tkaronto: Model Press, 2022.
