= Zachée N'Dock =

Cameroonian wrestler (born 1954)

Personal information
- Nationality: Cameroonian
- Born: 5 August 1954 (age 71)

Sport
- Sport: Wrestling

Zachée N'Dock (born 5 August 1954) is a Cameroonian wrestler. He competed in the men's freestyle 82 kg at the 1980 Summer Olympics.
