= Viktor Novozhilov (wrestler) =

Russian wrestler

Medal record

Men's freestyle wrestling

Representing the Soviet Union

Olympic Games
Silver medal – second place	1976 Montreal	middleweight

Viktor Vladimirovich Novozhilov (Russian: Виктор Владимирович Новожилов; 5 June 1950 in Leningrad, Soviet Union (now St. Petersburg, Russia) – 1991) was a Russian wrestler who received a Silver medal in the 1976 Summer Olympics.
