= Mehmet Uzun =

Turkish wrestler

Personal information
- Nationality: Turkish
- Born: 6 June 1950 (age 76)

Sport
- Sport: Wrestling

Mehmet Uzun (born 6 June 1950) is a Turkish wrestler. He competed in the men's freestyle 82 kg at the 1976 Summer Olympics.
