= Armin Weier =

German wrestler

Personal information
- Nationality: German
- Born: 17 July 1956 (age 70) Loitz, Germany

Sport
- Sport: Wrestling

Armin Weier (born 17 July 1956) is a German wrestler. He competed in the men's freestyle 82 kg at the 1980 Summer Olympics.
