= Adolf Seger =

German wrestler (1945–2026)

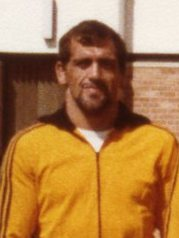
- Seger in 1978

Personal information
- Born: 2 January 1945 Freiburg im Breisgau, Gau Baden–Alsace, Germany
- Died: 5 July 2026 (aged 81) Freiburg im Breisgau, Baden-Württemberg, Germany
Medal record
Men's freestyle wrestling
Representing West Germany
Olympic Games
Bronze medal – third place	1972 Munich	74 kg
Bronze medal – third place	1976 Montreal	82 kg
World Championships
Gold medal – first place	1975 Minsk	82 kg
Gold medal – first place	1977 Lausanne	82 kg
Silver medal – second place	1978 Mexico City	82 kg

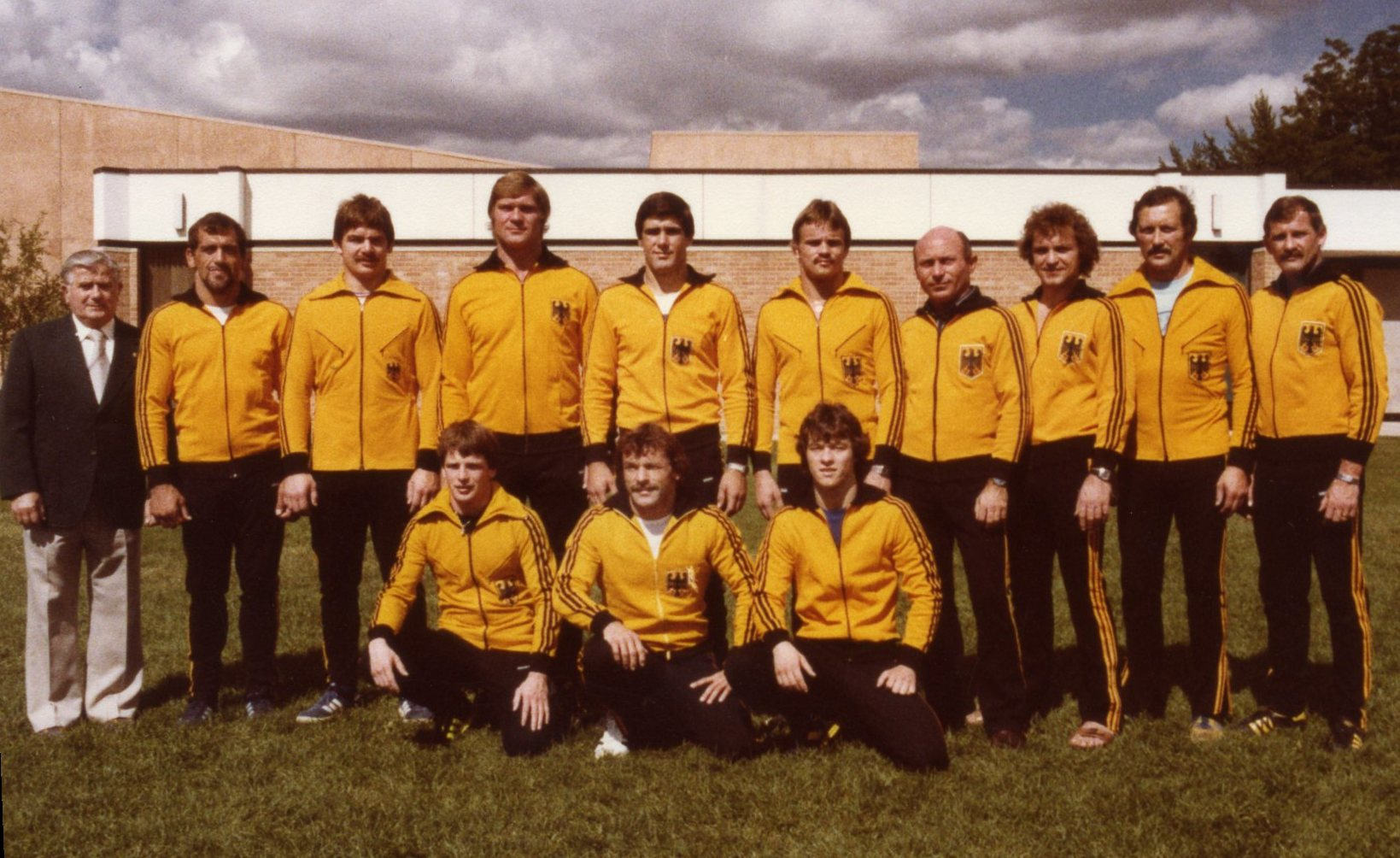
Adolf Seger and the German National Wrestling Team (1978)

Adolf Seger (2 January 1945 – 4 July 2026) was a German freestyle wrestler who competed in the 1972 Summer Olympics and in the 1976 Summer Olympics winning two bronze medals. In the Wrestling veterans Masters he won the world champion title ten times.

== Background ==
Seger was born in Freiburg im Breisgau, Germany on 2 January 1945, into a wrestling family. His father and his five brothers were all active in the sport. He received his first wrestling lessons at the age of five from his father. His role model was his older brother, Edmund, who competed with the German national wrestling team at the Summer Olympic Games in Rome in 1960.

He was married and the father of three children. For over 40 years he worked as a mailman for the German Post in Freiburg-Zaehringen, before retiring in January 2010. His interests included local politics, charity and the promotion of sports. He still trained in retirement and kept his competition weight, and also served in his club AV Germania St. Georgen as a training partner and coach.

Seger died in Freiburg im Breisgau on 4 July 2026, at the age of 81.

== Sports career ==
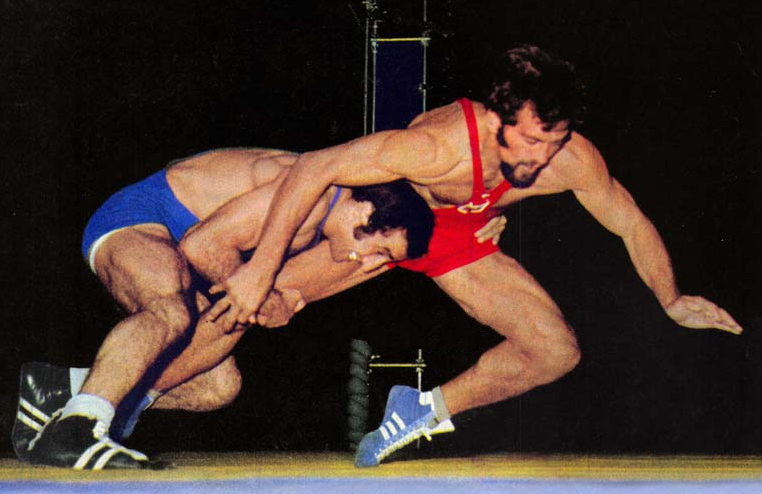
Adolf Seger (red) vs. Mansour Barzegar (1973)

Seger started in freestyle (Welter and Middleweight), and he was frequently a German, European and world champion. Among his greatest successes were also the medals gained at the Summer Olympic Games in Munich in 1972 and the Summer Olympic Games in Montreal in 1976. Seger is considered one of Germany's best wrestlers of all times. Particular, he has further developed the fighting techniques on the ground by his talent for movement. With the "Seger-grip" named after him, he has achieved numerous victories.

He had major health problems as a young wrestler. In the mid-1960s he was afflicted not only by the typical wrestler "cauliflower ear", but also by shoulder, back and knee injuries. During this time, Seger was in constant treatment at the University Hospital Freiburg. The injury delayed his international sports career by several years. Nevertheless, Seger managed to get back to competition level.

== German Championships ==
Note: all the competitions in free style, OS = Olympic Games, WM = World Championship, EM = European Championship, welterweight, and 74 kg middleweight, to 82 kg body weight
