= Masaru Motegi =

Japanese wrestler (born 1950)

Personal information
- Born: 23 April 1950 (age 76)
- Height: 170 cm (5 ft 7 in) (1976)
- Weight: 84 kg (185 lb) (1976)
Medal record
Men's freestyle wrestling
Representing Japan
Asian Games
Gold medal – first place	1978 Bangkok	82 kg
Silver medal – second place	1974 Tehran	82 kg

Masaru Motegi (茂木 優, Motegi Masaru; born 23 April 1950) is a Japanese former wrestler who competed in the 1976 Summer Olympics.
