= Castroviejo =

- Municipality
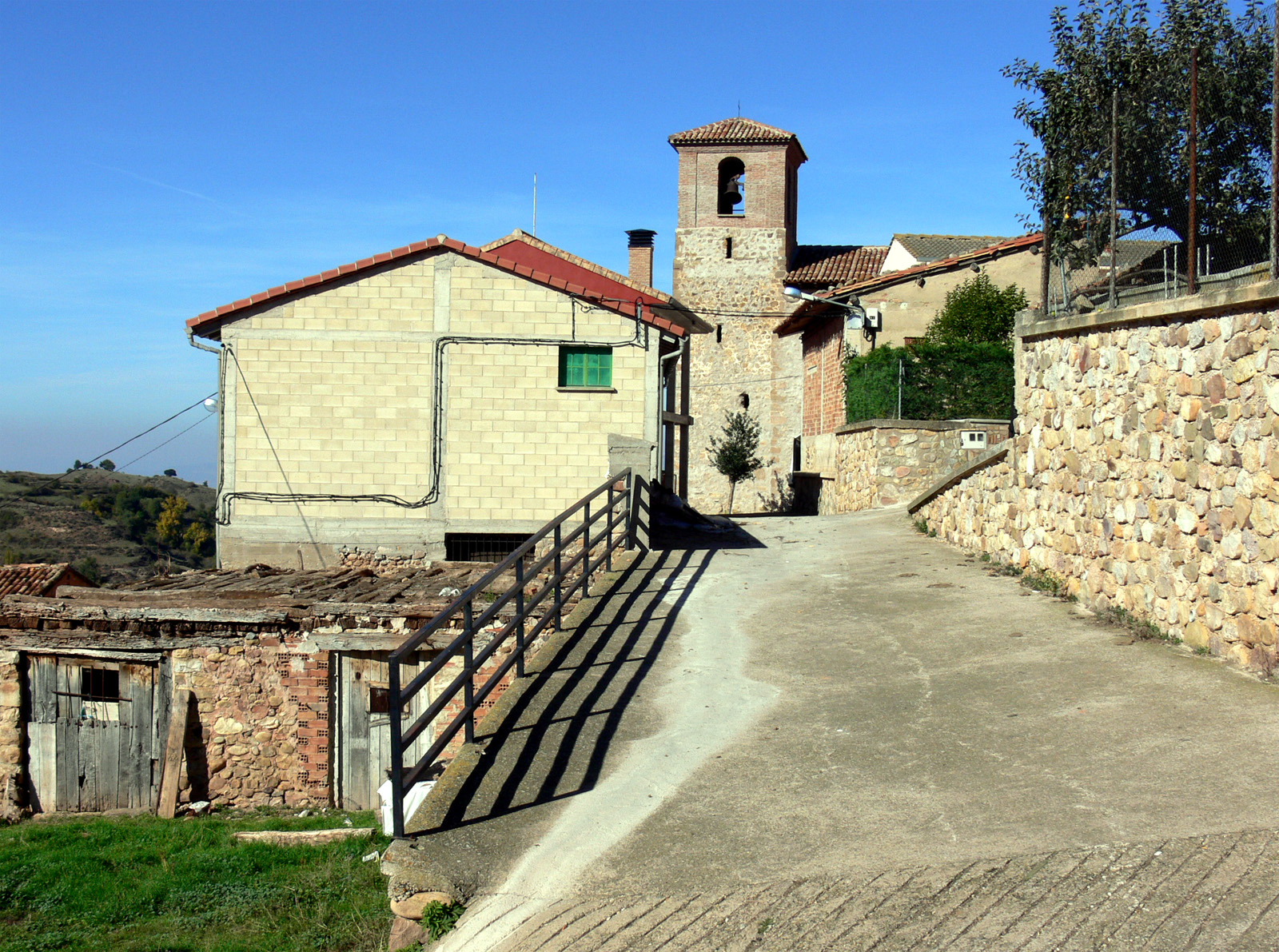

- Location within La Rioja, Spain Location within Spain
- Coordinates: 42°19′47″N 2°39′42″W
- Country: Spain
- Autonomous community: La Rioja
- Comarca: Nájera

Government
  - Alcalde: José Domingo Ceniceros Lacalle (PSOE)

Area
  - Total: 20.75 km^{2} (8.01 sq mi)
- Elevation: 967 m (3,173 ft)

Population (2025-01-01)
  - Total: 57
  - Density: 2.7/km^{2} (7.1/sq mi)
- Postal code: 26315

Castroviejo is a village in the province and autonomous community of La Rioja, Spain. The municipality covers an area of 20.75 square kilometres (8.01 sq mi) and as of 2011 had a population of 67 people.

== Notable people ==
- Juan Pérez Najera (1845-1939), military and politician
