= István Kovács (wrestler) =

Hungarian wrestler (born 1950)

Medal record

Representing Hungary

Men's Freestyle wrestling

Olympic Games
Bronze medal – third place	1980 Moscow	Middleweight

World Championships
Gold medal – first place	San Diego 1979	84 kg freestyle

István Kovács (born 27 June 1950 in Nádudvar) is a Hungarian wrestler. He was born in Nádudvar in Hajdú-Bihar County. He was Olympic bronze medalist in Freestyle wrestling in 1980. He won a gold medal at the 1979 World Wrestling Championships.
