= Ahmadjan Khasan =

Afghan wrestler (born 1957)

Ahmadjan Khasan (born 2 June 1957) is a former Afghanistan wrestler, who competed at the 1980 Summer Olympics in the middleweight event.
