= Ibrahim Diop =

Senegalese wrestler (born 1948)

Ibrahim Diop (born 1948) is a Senegalese former wrestler who competed in the 1972 Summer Olympics and in the 1976 Summer Olympics.
