= Magomedkhan Aratsilov =

Russian wrestler

Medal record

Men's freestyle wrestling

Representing the Soviet Union

Olympic Games
Silver medal – second place	1980 Moscow	middleweight

Magomedkhan Aratsilov (born 7 May 1951) is a Soviet former wrestler who competed in the 1980 Summer Olympics. He was born in Khurukh.
