= Manuel Villapol =

Puerto Rican wrestler

Personal information
- Nationality: Puerto Rican
- Born: 21 June 1956 (age 70)

Sport
- Sport: Wrestling

Manuel Villapol (born 21 June 1956) is a Puerto Rican wrestler. He competed in the men's freestyle 82 kg at the 1976 Summer Olympics.
