= Günter Busarello =

Austrian wrestler

Personal information
- Nationality: Austrian
- Born: 27 April 1960 Hohenems, Austria
- Died: 8 November 1985 (aged 25) Klaus, Austria

Sport
- Sport: Wrestling

Günter Busarello (27 April 1960 – 8 November 1985) was an Austrian wrestler. He competed at the 1980 Summer Olympics and the 1984 Summer Olympics.
