= Richard Stevenson (poet) =

Canadian poet (1952–2023)

- Born: 4 April 1952; Victoria, British Columbia, Canada
- Died: 18 October 2023 (aged 71); Victoria, British Columbia, Canada
- Education: University of British Columbia; University of Victoria
- Occupations: College teacher, poet
- Employer: Lethbridge College

Richard Stevenson (4 March 1952 – 18 October 2023) was a Canadian teacher and poet. Stevenson taught English at Lethbridge College in Lethbridge, Alberta, and also taught in Nigeria for a few years.

Stevenson held degrees in English and creative writing from the University of Victoria and University of British Columbia. He was also a musician with the young adult group Sasquatch and the jazz/poetry ensemble Naked Ear.

Stevenson was an accomplished writer, publishing more than 40 works of poetry, haiku, and fiction, with five titles forthcoming posthumously. A former editor-in-chief of PRISM international, he served in various editorial, jury, and writing and arts group executive capacities over the years. Stevenson's reviews and poems have appeared in hundreds of magazines, anthologies, e-zines, and journals published in Canada, the United States, and overseas.

== Awards ==
- Norma Epstein Award for Creative Writing (co-winner), 1983.
- Vancouver Literary Storefront Chapbook Award, 1983.
- Stephan G. Stephansson Award for Poetry, for the book, From the Mouths of Angels. The award is bestowed annually by the Writers' Guild of Alberta.
- ACIFA Excellence in Promoting Student Learning Award, 1996.
- Pyrowords' Literary Rose Award, 1997.
- Second Prize, Sketches of Miles Contest, 2001.

Source: University of Toronto Libraries: Canadian Poetry Online and University of Manitoba: The Canadian Literature Archive

== Partial list of works ==
Books and CD

- Driving Offensively (Sono Nis Press, 1985 )
- Suiting Up (Third Eye Publications, 1986 )
- Horizontal Hotel: A Nigerian Odyssey (TSAR Publications, 1989 )
- Whatever It Is Plants Dream (Goose Lane Editions, 1990 )
- Learning To Breathe (Cacanadadada Press, 1992)
- From The Mouths of Angels (Ekstasis Editions, 1993)
- Flying Coffins (Ekstasis Editions, 1994)
- Why Were All The Werewolves Men? (Thistledown Press, 1994)
- Wiser Pills (HMS Electronic Books, 1994)
- A Murder of Crows: New & Selected Poems (Black Moss Press, 1998)
- Nothing Definite Yeti (Ekstasis Editions, 1999)
- C4/4 Miles [CD] (a Muse 'n' Blues Production of Sound Gallery Enterprises, 1999) with poetry/jazz troupe Naked Ear and composer Gordon Leigh
- Live Evil: A Homage To Miles Davis (Thistledown Press, 2000 )
- Hot Flashes: Maiduguri Haiku, Senryu, and Tanka (Ekstasis Editions, 2001)
- Take Me To Your Leader! (Bayeux Arts Inc., 2003)
- A Charm of Finches (Ekstasis Editions, 2004)
- Parrot With Tourette's (Black Moss Press, Palm Poets Series, 2004)
- Alex Anklebone & Andy The Dog (Bayeux Arts Inc., 2005)
- Flicker at the Fascia: Poems (Serengeti Press, 2005)
- Riding On a Magpie Riff (Black Moss Press, memoir for their Settlements series, 2006)
- Bye Bye Blackbird: An Elegiac Suite for Miles Davis (Ekstasis Editions, 2007)
- The Emerald Hour: Haiku, Senryu, Tanka, and Zappai; photographs by Ellen McArthur (Ekstasis Editions, 2008)
- Tidings of Magpies: Haiku, Senryu, and Tanka (Spotted Cow Press, 2008)
- Wiser Pills (Revised Edition, Frontenac Editions, 2008)
- Windfall Apples (Athabasca University Press, 2010)
- Casting Out Nines (Ekstasis Editions, 2011)
- The Haunting of Amos Manor (Palimpsest Press / Magpie Books, 2011)
- A Dog Named Normal (Ekstasis Editions, 2013)
- Fruit Wedge Moon (Hidden Brook Press, 2015)
- The Heiligen Effect: Selected Haikai Poems & Sequences (Ekstasis Editions, 2015)
- Rock, Scissors, Paper: The Clifford Olson Murders (Grey Borders Press, 2016)
- A Gaggle of Geese: Haiku, Senryu, Tanka, Kyoka, and Zappai (Alba Publishing, 2017)
- Eye to Eye with My Octopi (Cyberwit, 2022)
- Bature! West African Haikai (Mawenzi House Publishers, 2022)
- Hairy Hullabaloo (Starship Sloane Publishing, 2024)

Chapbooks

- Hierarchy At The Feeder (dollarpoem editions, 1984)
- Twelve Houseplants (dollarpoem editions, 1985)
- Dick and Jane Have Sex (greensleeve editions, 1990)
- Fuzzy Dice (Cubicle Press, 2004)
- Frank's Aquarium (Cubicle Press, 2004)
- Tempus Fugit (Laurel Reed Books, 2005)
- Jazz Pops for Jack (Laurel Reed Books, 2011)
- Neon Headband (Leaf Press, 2012)

Selected anthologies

- Landmarks (Acorn Press, 2001)

Source: University of Toronto Libraries: Canadian Poetry Online, The University of British Columbia, and University of Manitoba: The Canadian Literature Archive
