= Fernando Villapol =

Spanish sculptor (born 1953)

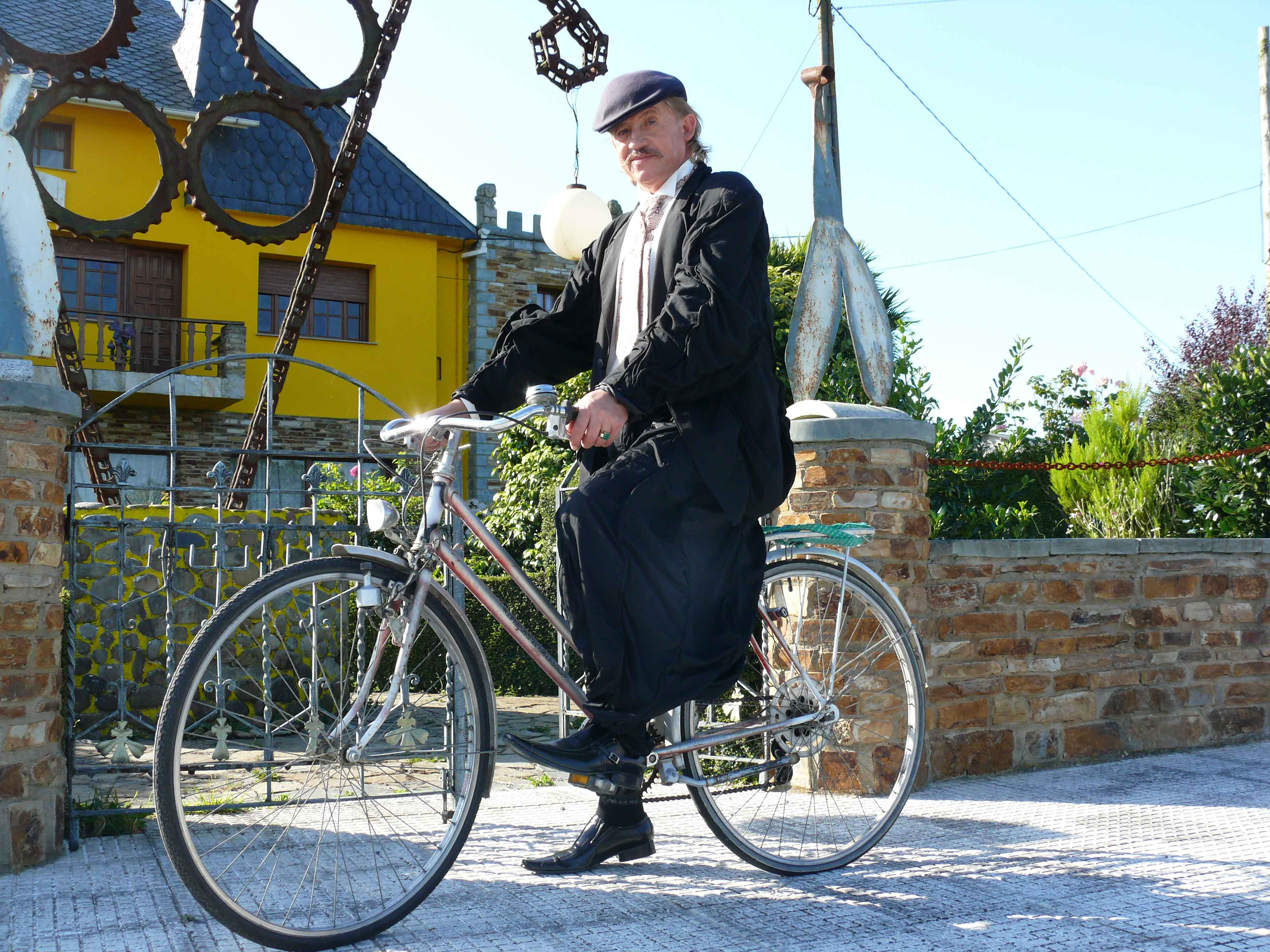
The artist Fernando Villapol in front of his home in Bretoña, Spain

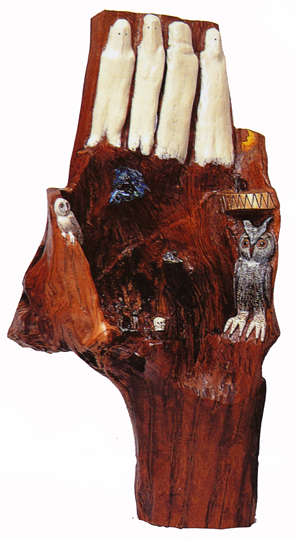
"Rei e Reiña da noite" Villapol, Chestnut tree, 1998

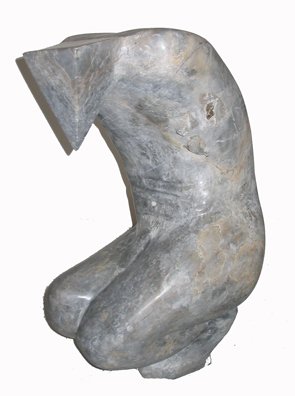
"Pensamientos en el vértice" Villapol, Marble, 2002

Fernando Villapol Parapar (born 26 February 1953 in San Tirso de Abres, Asturias Spain) is a museum curator and art critic, most famous as a contemporary Galician sculptor. He currently lives and works in the town of Bretoña (Lugo) located in Galicia. He is also the founder of the Ethnographic-Pedagogic Museum in Bretoña. He studied at the College of Applied Arts in Lugo, Spain, although can be considered an autodidact, attributing most of his knowledge and acquired skills through his self-funded travels and investigations of sculpture across the globe (e.g. Africa, Cuba, Canada, Denmark, France, Greece, Italy, Norway, Portugal, Sweden).

== Materials of choice ==
Villapol's sculptures embody a wide variety of materials, including but not limited to:

- metal (iron, bronze)
- wood (Galician common yew, oak, Spanish box tree, chestnut tree)
- stone (marble, granite).

== Artistic style ==
Critics of Villapol's work often define his sculptures as one or combination of: realism, abstractism, and surrealism. The artist has been said to be inspired by works from Diego Velázquez, Urbano Lugrís, Eugenio Granell, and Salvador Dalí. More recently, critics have suggested that Villapol's style cannot be defined by any one of these labels but as a fusion of all three: REalism + ABstractism + SUrrealism. This has been recently stated by the artist himself:

Critics have not succeeded in finding a single style to define my body of work. The majority of critics arrive at the conclusion that my body of work is a mixture of realism, abstractism, and surrealism. Using the first syllables from each of these styles I have created a new word to better define the artistic style that I create, called reabsu.

== Awards and distinctions ==
- Arte de Meigas e Trasnos Prize (Sarria, Spain, 1990)
- Lugo Plastic Arts Award (Lugo, Spain, 1994 )
- Cangas do Morrazo Prize (Cangas, Spain, 2004–2006 )
- 10th Burela Art Competition, awarded 1st prize in sculpture (Burela, Spain, 2005)
- Luarca Arts award (Luarca, Spain, 2006 )

== Ethnographic-Pedagogic Museum ==
The museum was founded and is curated by Villapol in 2002 houses a wide display of rural Galician culture and contemporary Galician art. The pieces from local folk history show the evolution of the various important trades in the district: clog maker, baker, carpenter, shoemaker, basket weaver, and farming. There are also education displays which show a typical Galician school, doctor's office, dentist's office, chemist as they were seen in the 19th century. Additionally, the museum contains original manuscripts by Otero Pedrayo, Vicente Risco, Bouza Brey, Antonio Fraguas, Iglesia Alvariño, Camilo García Trelles, González Garcés, and Castroviejo, as well as a wide collection of paintings from contemporary Galician artists: Urbano Lugrís, Laxeiro, Castrogil, Vilar Chao, Mariano Garcia Patiño and Mayor Balboa. Also, the museum also boasts a collection of over 2000 authentic Galician and Asturian soda syphon bottles.

== Public collections ==
- Provincial Museum of Lugo (Lugo, Spain)
- Ethnographic-Pedagogic Museum (Bretoña, Lugo, Spain)
- Museum of Fonsagrada (Lugo, Spain)

== Selected solo exhibitions ==
- González Garcés Library (A Coruña, Spain)
- Provincial Museum of Lugo (Lugo, Spain)
- Museum of Fonsagrada (Fonsagrada, Lugo, Spain)
- Ateneo of Ourense (Ourense, Spain)
- Provincial Library of Lugo (Lugo, Spain)
- Esmelgar Gallery
- Almirante Gallery
- Bacabú Gallery (Lugo, Spain)
- Sargadelos Gallery (Vigo, Spain)
- Eiros Gallery (Meira, Spain)
- Solloso Gallery (Ribadeo, Spain)
- Taramundi Cultural Center (Taramundi, Asturias, Spain)
- A Guardia Cultural Center (Pontevedra, Spain)
- San Tirso Cultural Center (San Tirso de Abres, Asturias, Spain)
- Puerta II Gallery (Lugo, Spain)
- Cangas do Morrazo Cultural Center (Pontevedra, Spain)
- Grisolart Gallery ( Barcelona, Spain)
- Magdalena Church in Rivadavia (Ourense, Spain)
- University of Sek (Segovia, Spain)
- Salnés Exhibition (Cambados, Pontevedra, Spain)
- El Vendrell (Tarragona, Spain)
- Vegadeo Cultural Center (Vegadeo, Asturias, Spain)
- Burela Cultural Center (Burela, Lugo, Spain)
- Alvaro Delgado de Luarca Gallery (Luarca, Asturias, Spain)
- Cajastur Bank Exhibit (throughout Asturias, Spain)
- Antique Museum (París, France)
- Pazo Melgaso (Portugal)
- Ribadeo Exhibition (Lugo)
