= Henryk Mazur =

Polish wrestler

Henryk Mazur (born 29 January 1953, in Tarnów) is a Polish former wrestler who competed in the 1976 Summer Olympics and in the 1980 Summer Olympics. He now lives in Sweden.
