= John Weier =

Canadian poet (born c. 1949)

John Weier is a Canadian poet born in Winnipeg, Manitoba in 1949. Formerly the president of the League of Canadian Poets, he has published five collections of poetry as well as a number of works of fiction and non-fiction. Weier grew up in a Mennonite family in southern Manitoba, and lived in Niagara on the Lake before returning to Winnipeg.

He has been the writer-in-residence at the Winnipeg Public Library, owns his own chapbook company, and also works as a professional luthier. In 2004 his book Stand the Sacred Tree: Journeys in Place and Memory was shortlisted for the McNally Robinson Book of the Year Award.
