= Irma (name) =

- Gender: Female

Other gender
- Masculine: Irmin, Irman

Origin
- Origin: German

Other names
- Related names: Irmeli, Irmelin, Irmhild

Irma is a female given name.

It is also used in combination with other names in the abbreviated form "Irm-," for example, Irmine, Irmela, Irmgard, Irmgardis, and Irmentraud. The name comes from the Old High German "irmin", meaning "world".

There is also an unrelated Georgian given name "Irma" which comes from the Georgian word "iremi"—"deer".

The name days for Irma are February 19 (Germany), March 31 (Estonia, Finland), April 7 (Sweden), May 3 (Hungary), September 10 (Czech Republic), September 18 (Poland), October 13 (Latvia), October 25 (USA), and November 14 (Slovakia).

The name Irma is popular in the Balkans, particularly in Bosnia and Herzegovina and Croatia. Its popularity in Bosnia and Herzegovina grew among Bosniaks after the tragic death of five-year-old Irma Hadžimuratović, a victim of VRS shelling that hit a Sarajevo neighborhood in 1993 during the siege of Sarajevo. Following Irma's death, Operation Irma was the name applied to a series of airlifts of injured civilians from Bosnia and Herzegovina.

The male version of Irma is Irmin (for example, Irmin Schmidt) or Irman (for example, Irman Gusman). These male versions are commonly found in Indonesia and Bosnia and Herzegovina.

== Given name ==
- Irma Baltuttis (1920–1958), German singer
- Irma Baralija (born 1984), Bosnian politician, teacher, and democracy activist
- Irma Brandeis (1905–1990), American Dante scholar
- Irma Capece Minutolo (1935–2023), Italian opera singer
- Irma Čremošnik, (1916–1990) Slovenian teacher, archaeologist, and philologist
- Irma Flaquer (1938–1980), Guatemalan government critic
- Irma Grese (1923–1945), German Nazi concentration camp guard
- Irma Hannah Gross (1892–1980), American home economist
- Irma Heijting-Schuhmacher (1925–2014), Dutch freestyle swimmer
- Irma Huerta (born 1969), Mexican freestyle swimmer
- Irma B. Jaffe (1917–2018), American art historian, educator, writer, and curator
- Irma Johansson (born 1932), Swedish cross-country skier
- Irma Keilhack (1908–2001), German politician
- Irma Khetsuriani (born 1985), Georgian wheelchair fencer
- Irma Kukkasjärvi (1941–2011), Finnish textile artist
- Irma La Pierre (1881–1951), American actress
- Irma LeVasseur (1877–1964), Canadian physician, first French-Canadian woman to become a doctor.
- Irma Kurtz (born 1935), American-born UK-based agony aunt
- Irma de Malkhazouny, Italian-born Serbian ballet dancer
- Irma May, Polish social reformer
- Irma McClaurin, American poet and anthropologist
- Irma Miranda (born 1996), Mexican model, TV host and beauty pageant titleholder
- Irma Nioradze (born 1969), Georgian ballerina
- Irma Pany (born 1988), Cameroonian singer/songwriter
- Irma S. Raker (born 1938), American lawyer
- Irma Poma Canchumani (born 1969), Peruvian artist and environmental defender
- Irma Rangel (1931–2003), American politician
- Irma S. Rombauer (1877–1962), cookbook author
- Irma Sandoval-Ballesteros (born 1972), Mexican academic
- Irma Serrano (1933–2023), Mexican actress
- Irma Stern (1894–1966), South African painter
- Irma St. Paule (1926–2007), Ukrainian-born American character actress
- Irma Theoda Jones (1845–1929), American philanthropist
- Irma Thomas (born 1941), American soul singer
- Irma Toivanen (1922–2010), Finnish politician and teacher
- Irma Voigt (1882–1953), American educator
- Irma von Cube (1899–1977), German-American screenwriter

== Fictional characters ==
- Irma (comics), a character from The Adventures of Tintin by Hergé
- Irma, the title character of Irma la Douce (1963), a comedy film by Billy Wilder
- Irma, the title character of the My Friend Irma television and radio situation comedies and a 1949 film
- Irma Barlow, a character in the British soap opera Coronation Street
- Irma Bunt, from On Her Majesty's Secret Service
- Irma Gobb, a character from the British sitcom Mr. Bean and its animated series.
- Irma Lair, character in W.I.T.C.H. series
- Irma Langinstein, in the 1987–1996 Teenage Mutant Ninja Turtles cartoon and Archie TMNT Adventures comics
- Irma Leopold, a character from Joan Lindsay's novel Picnic at Hanging Rock
- Irma Pince, librarian in the Harry Potter series
- Irma Crabbe, character in the Harry Potter series
- Irma the waitress, character in the Garfield comic strip by Jim Davis
- Irma Homais, daughter of fictional apothecary, M. Homais, and a minor character in Flaubert's Madame Bovary
- Irma Vep, character in the film within a film central to the 1996 French film titled Irma Vep
- 'Irma', lieutenant of Colony Mu who is also the Consul I, in Xenoblade Chronicles 3
- Irma Steiner, a character of the anime and manga Edens Zero and the mother of Weisz Steiner

== Other uses ==
- Hurricane Irma, 2017
- Operation Irma, 1993

== See also ==
- Irma (disambiguation)
- Erma (disambiguation)
