= Irmela =

- Gender: Female

Other gender
- Masculine: Irmin, Irman

Origin
- Origin: German

Other names
- Related names: Irma

Irmela is a feminine given name.

In the Balkans, Irmela is popular among the Bosniaks in the former countries of Yugoslavia. The name is a hybrid between Irma and Arnela, two names that are also popular among the population.

== Given name ==
- Irmela Broniecki, German fencer
- Irmela Hijiya-Kirschnereit, German Japanologist and translator
- Irmela Mensah-Schramm (born 1945), German human rights activist

== See also ==
- 1178 Irmela, asteroid
