= Irmas =

Irmas is a surname and may refer to:

- Audrey Irmas, American philanthropist and art collector
- Matthew Irmas, American film director and producer
- Sydney M. Irmas (c. 1925 – 1996), American attorney, investor, philanthropist, art collector

== See also ==
- IRMA (disambiguation)
- IRMS (disambiguation)
- Irma (disambiguation)
