= Espoonlahti Church =

Lutheran church in Espoonlahti, Espoo, Finland

Coordinates: 60.1494°N 24.6519°E

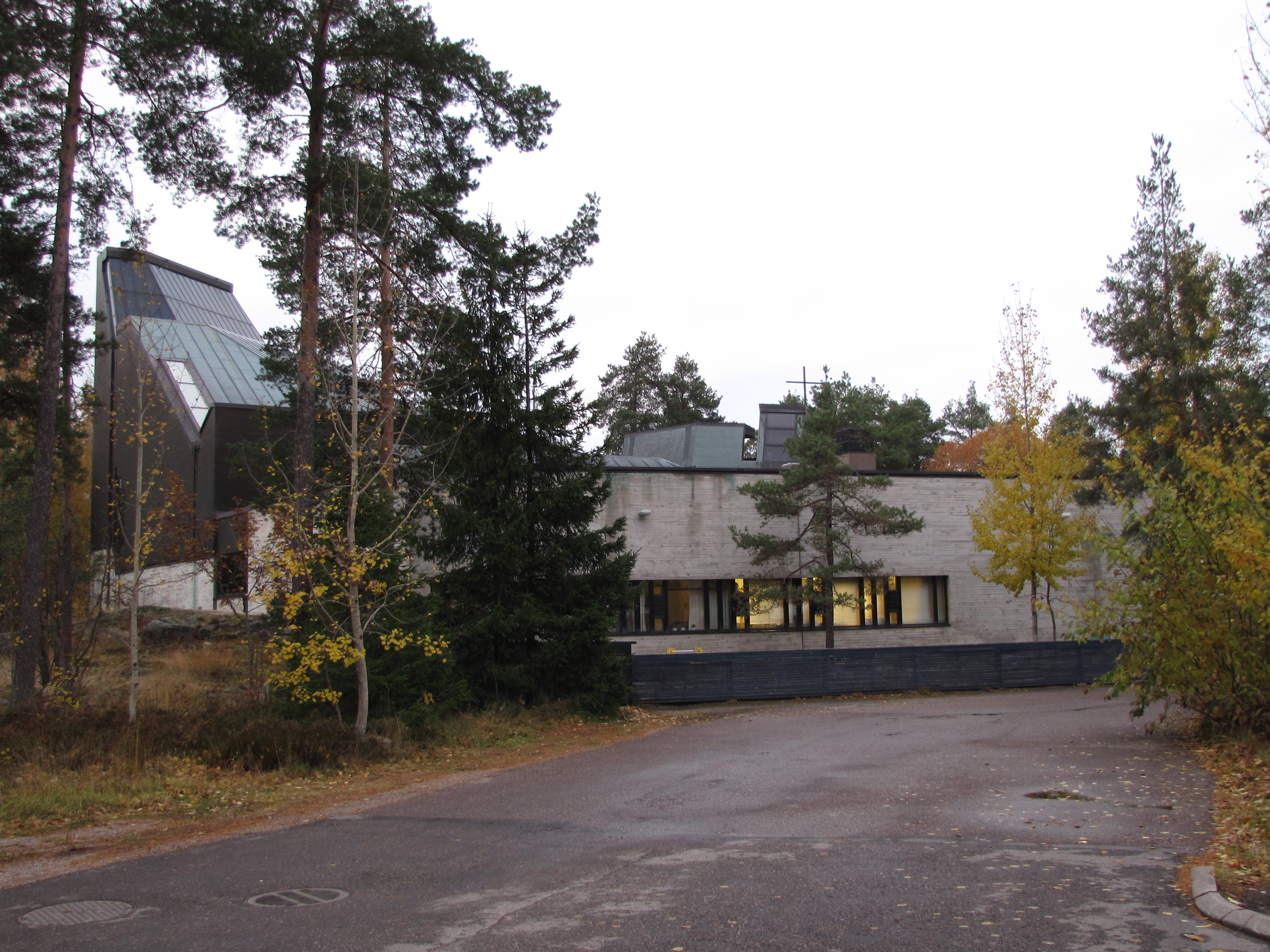
Espoonlahti Church was designed by architects Timo and Tuomo Suomalainen.

Espoonlahti Church (Finnish: Espoonlahden kirkko, Swedish: Esbovikens kyrka) is a Lutheran church situated in Espoonlahti, Espoo, Finland. It was designed by architects Timo and Tuomo Suomalainen, architects of the Rock Church (Temppeliaukion kirkko), who were also members of the Espoonlahti congregation. The groundstone for the church was set in August 1979 and the building was completed in 1980. The organs were built and assembled in 1983. As the number of members in the congregation grew rapidly, additional rooms were soon needed. This new phase of building was completed in 1987, also by the architects Suomalainen.

The shape of floor in the church hall is a polygon, and positioned so that during church service the Sun lights up the altar wall. The church hall itself seats 410 but when it is opened to the adjoining congregational hall, 710 can be seated. The building materials include concrete, copper and stone hewn from the bedrock on the building site. The interior face of the exterior walls is mainly laid in roughly cut stone blocks, while parts of it are made from concrete elements. The style is modern and some parts of the building lie about one metre deep in the bedrock. A votive ship hangs above the altar.

== Artwork in the church ==
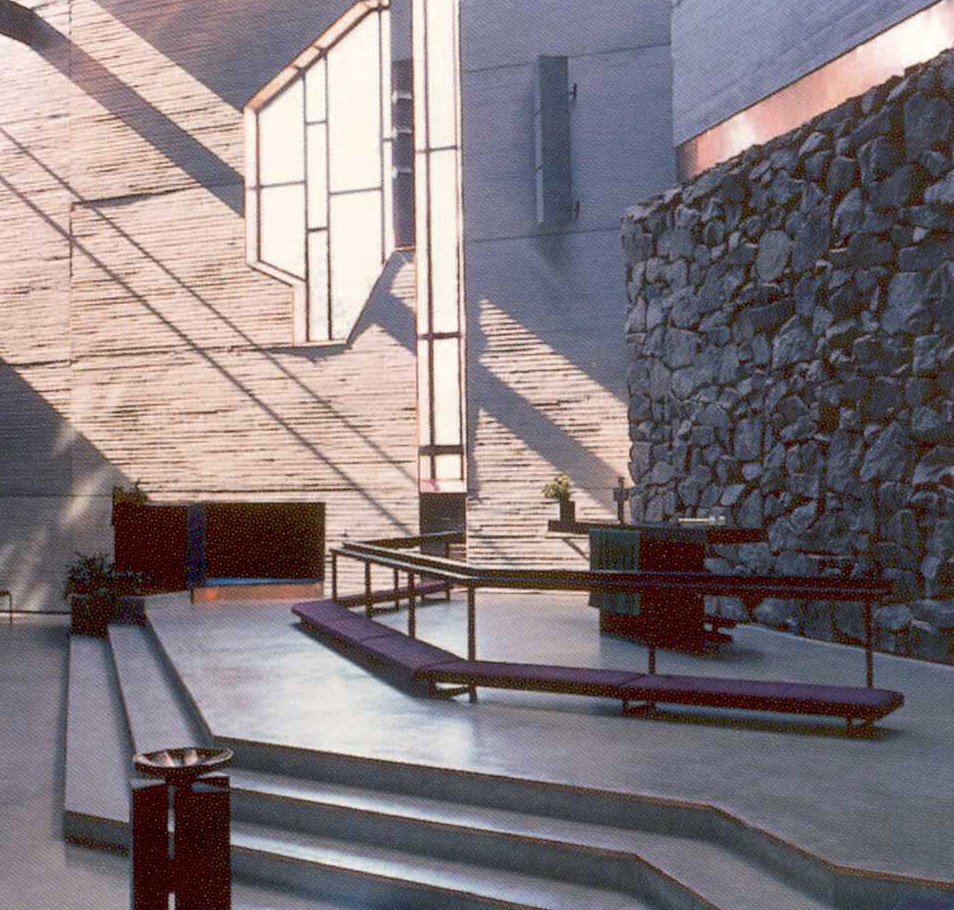
The altar area of Espoonlahti Church.

Instead of a more conventional piece of art on the altar wall, churchgoers in Espoonlahti admire the work of nature visible on the roughly cut edges of red granite that make the lower part of the tall wall behind the altar. The original textiles for the church were designed by Oili Mäki in 1980.

The largest group of prominent utensils or pieces of decoration in Espoonlahti Church are made of wrought iron by artisan smith Kauko Moisio. He has been working on the distinctive look of the church from early on and in cooperation with the architects Suomalainen. His creations include the flower vases and chandeliers decorating the altar as well as the christening font and the big chandeliers on the floor. His work are also the 60 candle holders fastened on the nooks of the rock wall in the entrance hall where a churchgoer can choose a favourite spot to light a candle to offer.

Originally, the only cross inside the church was the rather small and unpretentious crucifix on the altar called Christ of Compassion (Laupeuden Kristus) made by Kauko Moisio. This crucifix of steel has always been there, and it was the architects, who wanted it made unassuming, but at the same time strong and dependable. There the figure of Christ is suggested in the structure, but quite purposefully not clearly discernible so that everyone is able to can complete the figure according to one's own image of Christ. In 1999 a tall but light see-through likeness of a cross by Irma Kukkasjärvi was woven from threads of copper and hung behind the altar. This altar piece is called Mysterium Crucis, Spes Unica (Latin for Mystery of the Cross, the Only Hope).

== The organ ==
The Espoonlahti Church organ is situated in view full view of the congregation by the side wall on the right, opposite the pulpit. The organ was built by the Organ Building Company Veikko Virtanen of Espoo and fitted with a facade designed in cooperation between the architect brothers Suomalainen and the organ builders Virtanen. The instalment in the church started in the spring of 1982 and the instrument was in full working order the following spring. The organ was taken into use in a festive ceremony on May 22, 1983.

The Espoonlahti organ contains 40 independent stops divided into five sets of pipes. There are all in all 2,942 pipes, 24 out of which are wooden. The tallest one placed in the facade measures 600 centimetres in height and has a diameter of 27 cm. The total height of the instrument is 11 metres. The disposition was planned by church musician Lasse Erkkilä. The choice of stops and the quality of sound has been described as representing in style ideals belonging to the neobaroque and Scandinavia, spiced with romance. On several occasions this instrument has been chosen for Kesäillan Urkumusiikkia, a series of organ concerts given in summer evenings.
