= Irma =

Irma may refer to:

== People ==
- Irma (name), a female given name
- Irma (singer), full name Irma Pany, a Cameroonian female singer-songwriter

== Places ==
- Irma, Alberta, Canada, a village
- Irma, Lombardy, Italy, a comune
- Irma, Wisconsin, USA, an unincorporated community
- 177 Irma, a fairly large and dark main belt asteroid

== Brands and enterprises ==
- Irma (supermarket), a Danish supermarket chain
- IRMA board, an early interface card for PCs and Macs
- Irma Hotel, a landmark built in Cody, Wyoming by "Buffalo Bill" Cody (it is still open for business as both a hotel and restaurant)
- Irma Records, an Italian record label

== Other uses ==
- Irma (dog), a Dickin Medal-winning dog
- Operation Irma, a series of airlifts of civilians during the Siege of Sarajevo
- SS Irma (1905), a Norwegian merchant ship sunk in controversial circumstances in 1944
- Tropical Storm Irma, various storms named Irma
  - Hurricane Irma, the 9th named storm of the 2017 Atlantic hurricane season
- Institute of Rural Management Anand
- Irma (steamship) (sank 1911, Costa Rica)

== See also ==
- IRMA (disambiguation)
- Erma (disambiguation)
