= Irman (disambiguation) =

Irman is a village in Lorestan Province, Iran.

Irman also may refer to:

- Irin, Iran, a village in Tehran Province, Iran, also known as Irman
- Irman (name), given name and surname
