= Tuomo Suomalainen =

Finnish architect

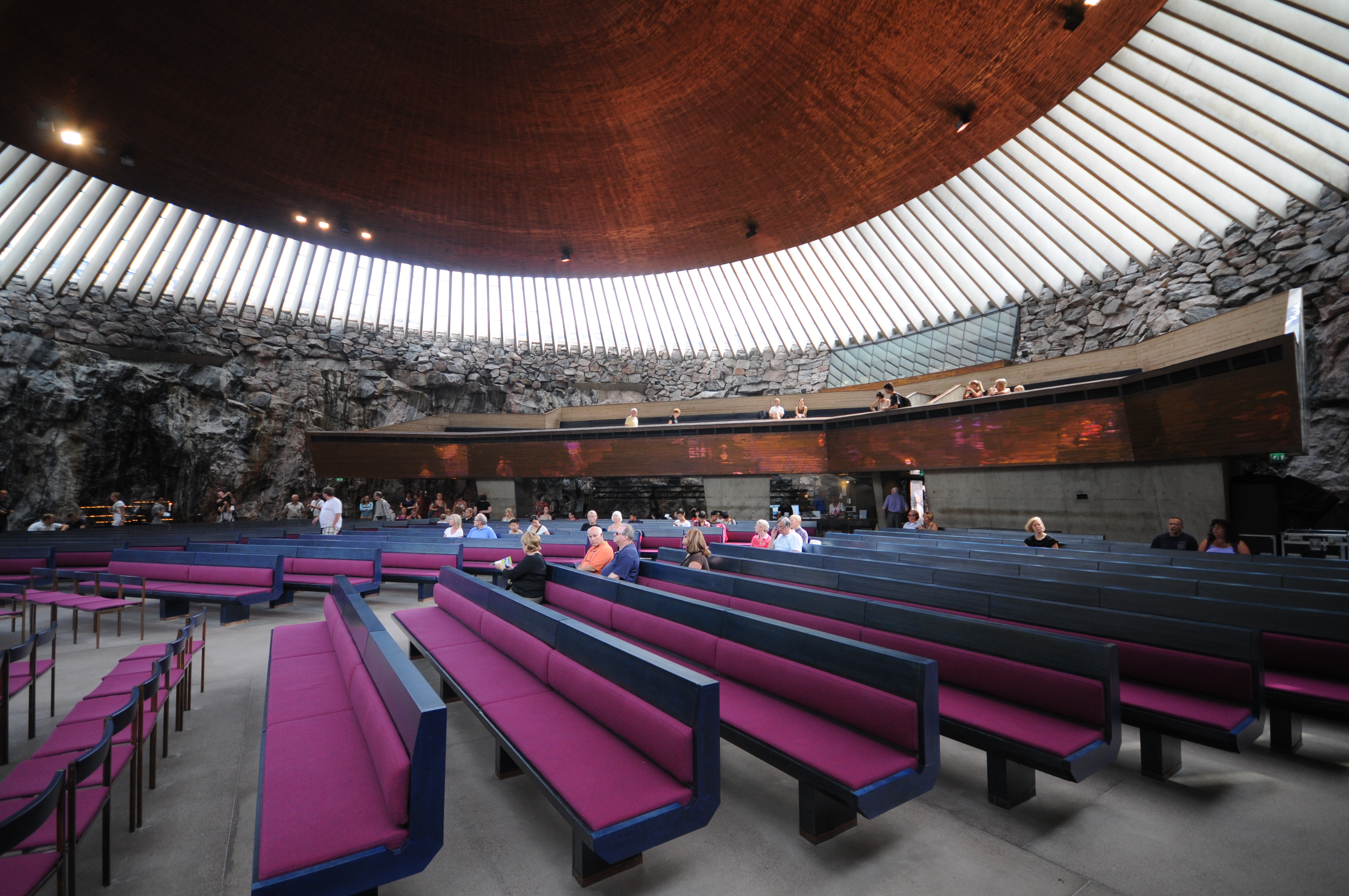
Temppeliaukio Church

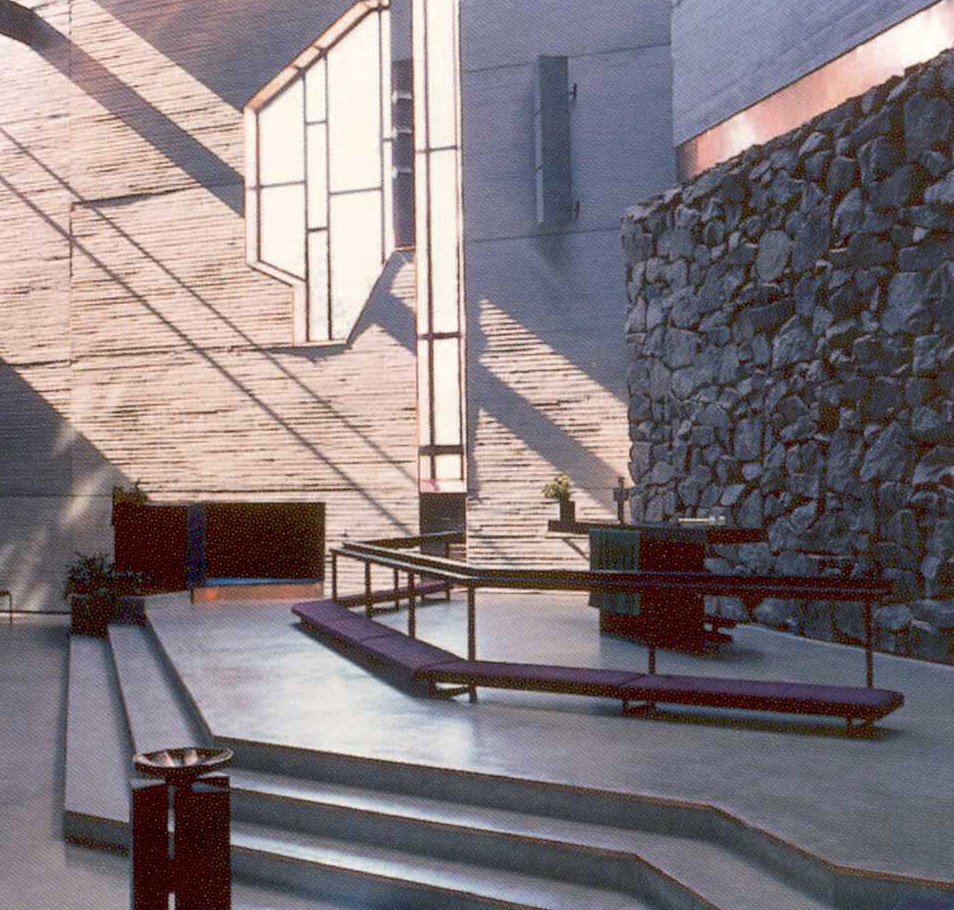
Altar of the Espoonlahti Church

Tuomo Oskari Suomalainen (29 November 1931 – 1 November 1988) was a Finnish architect born in Gogland. He worked very closely with his brother Timo Suomalainen who also was an architect. Most of the works they designed jointly.

Their most well known work is Temppeliaukio Church in Helsinki, which has become one of the most visited sites in Finland. Tuomo Suomalainen's last work was the chapel at Kellonummi cemetery in Espoo, this too, together with his brother. The chapel was inaugurated in 1993.

== Some buildings (with Timo Suomalainen) ==
- Temppeliaukio Church, Helsinki 1960–69
- Haaga Vocational School, Helsinki 1962–67
- Hotel Mesikämmen, Ähtäri 1973–76
- Central Stores of the National Board of Antiquities, Orimattila 1975–79
- Espoonlahti Church 1976–80
- Hamina police station and court house 1979–84
