= IRMA =

IRMA may refer to:

- Illinois Rape Myth Acceptance Scale
- Institute of Rural Management, Anand, a management school for rural development in the state of Gujarat, India
- International Rail Makers Association, a cartel of the late 19th and early 20th century
- International Ramen Manufacturers Association, the former name of the World Instant Noodles Association
- International Rectal Microbicide Advocates
- Intraretinal microvascular abnormalities, a component of diabetic eye disease
- Irish Recorded Music Association
- IRMA board, a brand name of mainframe terminal emulators
- Immunoradiometric assay, a type of biochemical test
- Intreprinderea de Reparatii Material Aeronautic, a Romanian aircraft manufacturer

== See also ==
- Irma (disambiguation)
