= Silly season =

Annual period when frivolous news becomes more common

In the United Kingdom, silly season is a period in the summer months known for frivolous news stories in the mass media. The term was first attested in 1861, and listed in the second (1894) edition of Brewer's Dictionary of Phrase and Fable. The 15th edition of Brewer's defined the silly season as "the part of the year when Parliament and the Law Courts are not sitting (about August and September)". In North America, the period is often referred to as the slow news season.

In Australia, New Zealand, and South Africa, the silly season has come to refer to the Christmas/New Year festive period (which occurs during the summer season in the Southern Hemisphere).

== Origin ==
The first attestation in the Oxford English Dictionary is an article titled "The Silly Season" in the Saturday Review edition of 13 July 1861. The article is specifically about an alleged reduction in the quality of the editorial content of The Times newspaper:

during the months of autumn [, w]hen Parliament is no longer sitting and the gay world is no longer gathered together in London, something very different is supposed to do for the remnant of the public from what is needed in the politer portions of the year. The Times's great men have doubtless gone out of town, like other great men. ... The hands which at other times wield the pen for our instruction are now wielding the gun on a Scotch moor or the Alpenstock on a Swiss mountain. Work is left to feebler hands. ... In those months the great oracle becomes —what at other times it is not—simply silly. In spring and early summer, the Times is often violent, unfair, fallacious, inconsistent, intentionally unmeaning, even positively blundering, but it is very seldom merely silly. ... In the dead of autumn, when the second and third rate hands are on, we sink from nonsense written with a purpose to nonsense written because the writer must write either nonsense or nothing.

== Motivation ==
Typically, the latter half of the summer is slow in terms of newsworthy events. Newspapers as their primary means of income rely on advertisements, which rely on readers seeing them, but historically newspaper readership drops off during this time. In the United Kingdom, Parliament takes its summer recess, so that parliamentary debates and Prime Minister's Questions, which generate much news coverage, do not happen. This period is also a summer school holiday, when many families with children choose to take holidays, and there is accordingly often a decline of business news, as many employers reduce their activity. With law courts not sitting, there is a lack of coverage of court cases. Similar recesses are typical of legislative bodies elsewhere. To retain (and attract) subscribers, newspapers would print attention-grabbing headlines and articles to boost sales, often to do with minor moral panics or child abductions. For example, the extensive British press coverage devoted to Operation Irma, a humanitarian airlift during the Siege of Sarajevo, was critiqued as a "silly season" tactic.

== Other names ==
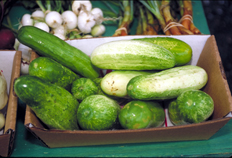
In many languages, the silly season is called "cucumber time" or similar.

Other countries have comparable periods, for example the Sommerloch ("summer [news]hole") in German-speaking Europe; French has la morte-saison ("the dead season" or "the dull season") or la saison des marronniers ("the conker tree season"), and Swedish has nyhetstorka ("news drought").

In many languages, the name for the silly season references cucumbers (more precisely: gherkins or pickled cucumbers). Some examples include Komkommertijd in Dutch, Danish agurketid, Icelandic gúrkutíð, Norwegian agurktid (a piece of news is called agurknytt or agurknyhet, i.e., "cucumber news"), Czech okurková sezóna ("pickle season"), Slovak uhorková sezóna, Polish Sezon ogórkowy, Hungarian uborkaszezon, and Hebrew עונת המלפפונים (onat ha'melafefonim, "season of the cucumbers"). The corresponding term in German is Sauregurkenzeit and in Estonian hapukurgihooaeg ("pickled cucumber season"); the same term is also used in Croatian as sezona kiselih krastavaca and in Slovene as čas kislih kumaric.

The term "cucumber time" was also used in England in the 1800s to denote the slow season for tailors.

A silly season news item is called rötmånadshistoria in Sweden and mätäkuun juttu in Finland, both literally meaning "rotting-month story".

In Spain the term serpiente de verano ("summer snake") is often used, not for the season, but for the news items. The term is a reference to the Loch Ness Monster and similar creatures, who are reputed to get more headlines in summer.

== Sport ==
Silly season also refers to periods outside traditional season-long competitive sporting competitions. In team sports such as association football and professional ice hockey, and leagues such as Formula One, NASCAR, the NBA, or the NFL, the final weeks of the season leading into off-time between one season and the next is filled with speculation regarding possible changes involving players, staff and teams. Regardless of whether the speculation remains just that or indeed bears fruit, the moves and the discussions they generate help build interest in the leagues, their teams and their upcoming seasons. For Major League Baseball, the term hot stove league describes that league's off-season.

Silly season is also used in professional golf to describe tournaments that are not official PGA Tour or LPGA Tour events. Normally scheduled at or near the end of the calendar year, when PGA and LPGA tournaments are not usually scheduled, these events also employ formats of play not normally seen on those tours. The Shark Shootout and the Skins Game are two such examples of silly season events.

== See also ==
- Clickbait – Web content intended to entice users to click on a link
- Dog days – Hottest part of summer in the Northern Hemisphere
- Eternal September – Internet jargon
- Holiday season – Christmas and surrounding holiday period
- Media circus – Phrase describing excessive media coverage
- October surprise – Event that may influence a US election
- Sensationalism – Type of editorial tactic used in mass media
- Tabloid journalism – Style of largely sensationalist journalism
- Yellow journalism – Sensationalistic news
- Filler (media) – Content inserted to pad out transmission gaps

== Bibliography ==
- Brewer's Dictionary of Phrase & Fable, 15th edition, 1996 published by Cassell.
- Brewer's Dictionary of Phrase & Fable, 2nd edition, 1898, online: definition for silly season
