= Ironmonger Lane =

Street in the City of London

Coordinates: 51.514400°N 0.091810°W

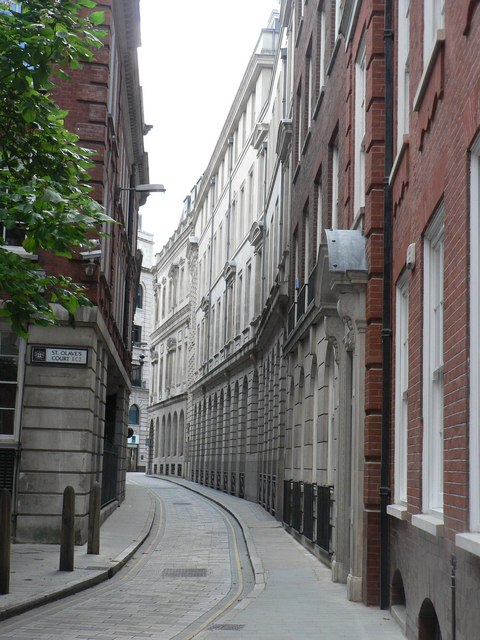
- Ironmonger Lane, at the turnoff of St Olave's Court
- Interactive map of Ironmonger Lane
- Length: 145 m (476 ft)
- Location: London, England
- Postal code: EC2
- Nearest train station: Bank
- North end: Gresham Street
- To: Cheapside

Ironmonger Lane is a narrow one-way street in the City of London running southbound between Gresham Street and Cheapside.

Ironmonger Lane has maintained the same name since at least the 12th century when it was recorded as Ismongerelane; "isen" was an old form of the word "iron". Its name indicates that it was the once the location of ironmongers, but by the end of the 16th century, when John Stow was writing his Survey of London, the ironmongers of Ironmonger Lane and Old Jewry had moved to Thames Street.

Until the Great Fire of London in 1666, Ironmonger Lane was one of only two accesses to the Guildhall (the other being Lawrence Lane), a matter which made the travel of dignitaries difficult as two vehicles could not pass each other. The problem was alleviated after the fire when King Street was added by Christopher Wren to provide an additional access to Cheapside.

Thomas Becket is said to have been born on the corner of Cheapside and Ironmonger Lane. The livery hall of the Worshipful Company of Mercers may lie on the same spot; it is a relatively modern building, the first hall having been destroyed in the Great Fire and a second in the Blitz. In the interwar-period, Ironmonger Lane was the seat of several cartels e.g. of the European Rail Makers Association ERMA.

The nearest London Underground/Docklands Light Railway station is Bank. The closest mainline railway stations are Cannon Street and Moorgate.
