= Irma May =

Polish social reformer and humanitarian (born 1899)

- Born: Irma Weitzenkorn; June 10, 1899; Lemberg, Poland (now Lviv, Ukraine)
- Other name: Irma May Abramowicz
- Occupations: Social reformer and humanitarian
- Era: 1920's

Irma May (born June 10, 1899) was a Polish social reformer and humanitarian who sought to publicise within North America the plight of Eastern European Jews during the 1920s.

== Career ==
Irma Weitzenkorn, later known as Irma May, was born in the Polish town of Lemburg on June 10, 1899. She travelled to the United States in 1920. A short time after she arrived, her fiancé was killed in Ukraine while conducting humanitarian work. May began to work to publicise the issues faced by Jewish people in Eastern Europe where they faced increased antisemitism following the economic downturn of that period. Her first public appeal was at Columbia University on December 16, 1920, alongside Rabbi Stephen Wise. As a result, the Columbia University Relief Committee formed a committee to raise money for the Eastern European Jews who were being denied access to education.

May returned to Eastern Europe on several occasions to investigate the impact on the region's Jewish population. Following a visit to Brest, Belarus in 1920, she said that "Hundreds are forced [to live] in cellars, anti-rooms and alleys of the old synagogues, they huddle together like wild beasts, twenty and thirty in one room", adding that it was akin to "hell on earth". In 1926, she toured the area for three months, reporting back to the United Jewish Campaign in New York City. Other talks were held as part of the campaign, including an event that same year in Montreal, Canada, on May 5. Her appearances resulted in large sums of money being raised for the cause, with $3.7 million pledged in New York alone.
