= IRMS =

IRMS may refer to:

- Indian Railways Management Service
- Information and Records Management Society
- Isotope ratio mass spectrometry
- Integrated Risk Management Services
