= Irma Čremošnik =

Slovene teacher, archaeologist and philologist

- Born: January 12, 1916; Arad, Austria-Hungary (now Romania)
- Died: June 16, 1990 (aged 74); Slano, Croatia
- Education: Ss. Cyril and Methodius University of Skopje, University of Ljubljana
- Occupations: Teacher, archaeologist, philologist

Irma Čremošnik (12 January 1916–29 June 1990) was a Slovene teacher, archaeologist and philologist chiefly known for extensive archaeological work on Roman-era remains in the territory of Bosnia and Herzegovina.

== Biography ==
Čremošnik was born in Arad, Austria-Hungary (now Romania), in the family of Slovene historian Gregor Čremošnik. She grew up in Sarajevo where her father worked in the National Museum of Bosnia and Herzegovina. After finishing the study of philology at the Ss. Cyril and Methodius University of Skopje, she served as a high school teacher, then became a curator in an art museum in Belgrade (1944–1947) and finally got a position in the National Museum of Bosnia and Herzegovina. In parallel, she took the doctoral course of archaeology at the Faculty of Arts in Ljubljana, obtaining a doctoral degree in 1952. She worked at the National Museum until retiring in 1976.

She led numerous excavations of ancient Roman villas and settlements in the territory of today's Bosnia and Herzegovina, most notably in Višići near Čapljina and in Panik near Bileća. She also made important discoveries from the early feudal period of the Slavic settlement in the area. Her published works include Mozaici i zidno slikarstvo rimskog doba ("Mosaics and wall paintings of the Roman era"; 1984). Additionally, she is credited for editing and publishing parts of her father's legacy.
