= Irma Poma Canchumani =

Peruvian artist

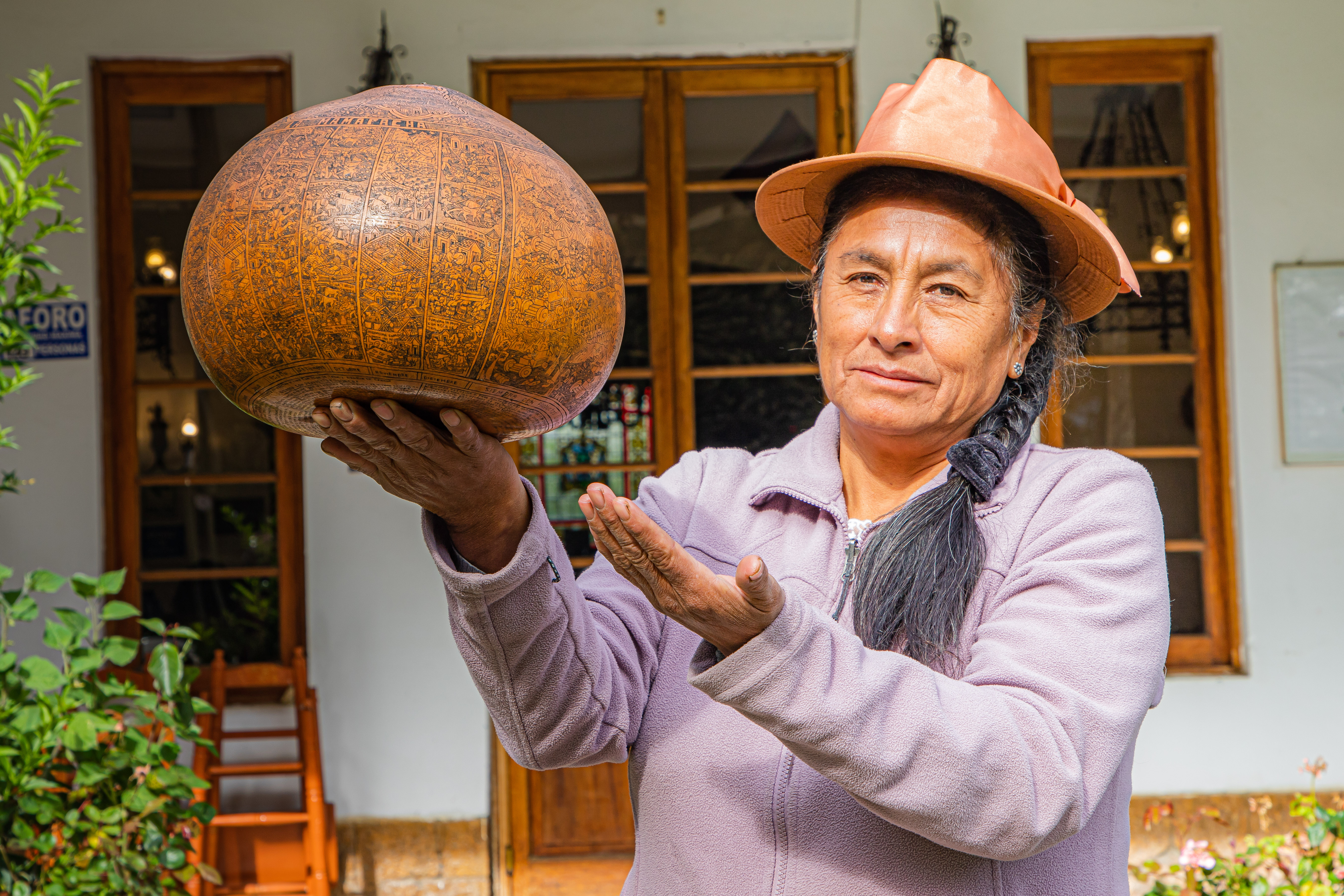
- Born: Irma Luz Poma Canchumani; August 12, 1969 (age 57); Cochas Grande, Junín Province, Peru
- Notable work: "Nuestra Ave Fénix"
- Style: mate burilado
- Awards: Personalidad Meritoria de la Cultura, 2012; Reconocimiento de Excelencia UNESCO para la Artesanía de la Región Andina, 2014

Irma Poma Canchumani (Junín Province, August 12, 1969) is a traditional Peruvian artist of mate burilado and an environmental defender. She received the "Meritorious Personality of Culture" award from the Peruvian Ministry of Culture and the "Recognition of Excellence for Handicrafts in the Andean Region" award from UNESCO.

== Biography ==
Irma Luz Poma Canchumani is the daughter of Agustín Poma and Angélica Canchumani, promoters of the collective memory of the Mantaro Valley in Cochas Grande, a town located a few kilometers from Huancayo that has maintained the tradition of carved art since the beginning of the 20th century. Her parents, Calabash carvers and engravers with different tendencies and techniques, recreated sequences of spiraling visual narratives, which are read as the piece is slowly rotated. The themes addressed focused on customs such as the limpia (Andean natural medicine cleansing procedure), marriage, house construction, textile practices, sowing, births, or illnesses. In this way, Pome has been linked to mate burilado since her childhood, showing a great interest in mythical, festive, and historical themes through her tracing, while preserving the family style, but also conducting her own research.

Every year, Poma has set out to create a new theme for her gourds. For example, in 2005, on the occasion of the 400th anniversary of Don Quixote de la Mancha, Poma won first place in a contest organized by the Ministerio de Educación (Perú) (Ministry of Education) and the Museo de la Nación, for which she had to read Miguel de Cervantes Saavedra's book more than five times to understand its meanings and be able to make the drawings.

Poma affirms that the carved mate is her life because through it, she can transmit the existence of her community. She points out that culture should not be lost: "with my pieces, I perpetuate the culture of my country, and I want the whole world to know where we live, where we eat".

As an environmentalist, Poma has participated in international forums and is part of the working team of the indigenous-led multimedia initiative Conversations with the Earth: Indigenous Voices on Climate Change. As part of her collaboration with this organization, in 2012, Poma exhibited her works in the exhibition Conversations with the Earth: Indigenous Voices on Climate Change at the National Museum of the American Indian in Washington, D.C. Her work is distributed in collections in the United States, England, Switzerland, Sweden, India, Japan, and South Africa.

== Awards and honours ==
At the age of 14, she won her first award in a contest organized by the NGO Minka de Huancayo, with a gourd depicting the sowing and harvesting of wheat. In 2005, she won first place in a contest organized by the Ministry of Education and the Museo de la Nación on the occasion of the 400th anniversary of Don Quixote de la Mancha. Likewise, she has been decorated as "Meritorious Personality of Culture" by the Ministry of Culture in 2012, and received the UNESCO Recognition of Excellence for Crafts of the Andean Region in 2014. She also won a Smithsonian Institution contest, with a tribute to the pachamama.

== Selected works ==
- "Nuestra Ave Fénix" (Our Phoenix Bird), a piece exhibited at the Metropolitan Municipality of Lima in 2017.
- Carved matte that summarizes in 38 scenes the first 54 chapters of Don Quixote de la Mancha, winner of the contest organized by the Ministry of Education and the Museum of the Nation of Peru for the quadricentennial of the emblematic work in 2005.
