= International Rail Makers Association =

The International Rail Makers Association (IRMA) was a cartel for the export of rail profiles that existed (with longer interruptions) between 1883 and the Second World War.

== History ==
Among cartel specialists, IRMA is known as the oldest larger international cartel, as the "grandmother of them all". From the beginning, it was a quota cartel. The domestic markets were usually reserved.

Because of disappointment, the association broke up in 1886. It was revived again in 1904, but not renewed in 1907. In 1912, it was re-established but the First World War ended its operations.

In the inter-war period the rail cartel was re-established as the "European Rail Makers Association" (ERMA). This name change was due to the reluctance of the American producers to join officially because of fear of antitrust entanglements.

The seat of IRMA was (since at least 1926): London (11, Ironmonger Lane). IRMA became defunct due to Second World War and the subsequently aggravated US antitrust.

== Members and their shares ==
For 1883, the IRMA members and their shares were as follows:

- Great Britain – 66 per cent of the available export business;
- Germany – 27 per cent;
- Belgium – 7 per cent.

Soon after this scheme was revised to:

- Great Britain – 63.5 per cent;
- Germany – 29 per cent;
- Belgium – 7.5 per cent.

In 1904, the following distribution was agreed on:

- Britain – 53.5 per cent of the export trade, with priority in trade with British possessions;
- Germany – 28.83 per cent;
- Belgium – 17.01 per cent;
- France – a gradually increasing tonnage representing 4.8 per cent, 5.8 per cent, and 6.4 per cent, respectively, of the total allotments to the old members.

In 1912, the scheme was changed to:

- Great Britain – 33.63 per cent;
- United States – 23.13 per cent;
- Germany – 23.13 per cent;
- Belgium – 11.11 per cent;
- France – 9 per cent.

For 1927, the larger members of ERMA and their shares were as follows:

- Great Britain (whose share included that of the United States) – 43 per cent, or 430,000 tons (as compared with a British export tonnage in 1925 of 217,196 tons);
- France – 19.5 per cent, or 195,000 tons (compared with 237,002 tons in 1925);
- Germany – 19.5 per cent, or 195,000 tons (compared with 288,272 tons in 1925);
- Belgium and Luxemburg – 11 per cent and 7 per cent, respectively, or 110,000 and 70,000 * tons (compared with a joint total of 168,332 tons in 1925);
- Czecho-Slovakia – 4 per cent, or 40,000 tons.

Smaller members were: Poland, Austria, Hungary, Italy and some independent business groups.
