= Temppeliaukio Church =

Church in Helsinki, Finland

Coordinates: 60°10′23″N 24°55′31″E

Temppeliaukio church
- Finnish: Temppeliaukion kirkko Swedish: Tempelplatsens kyrka
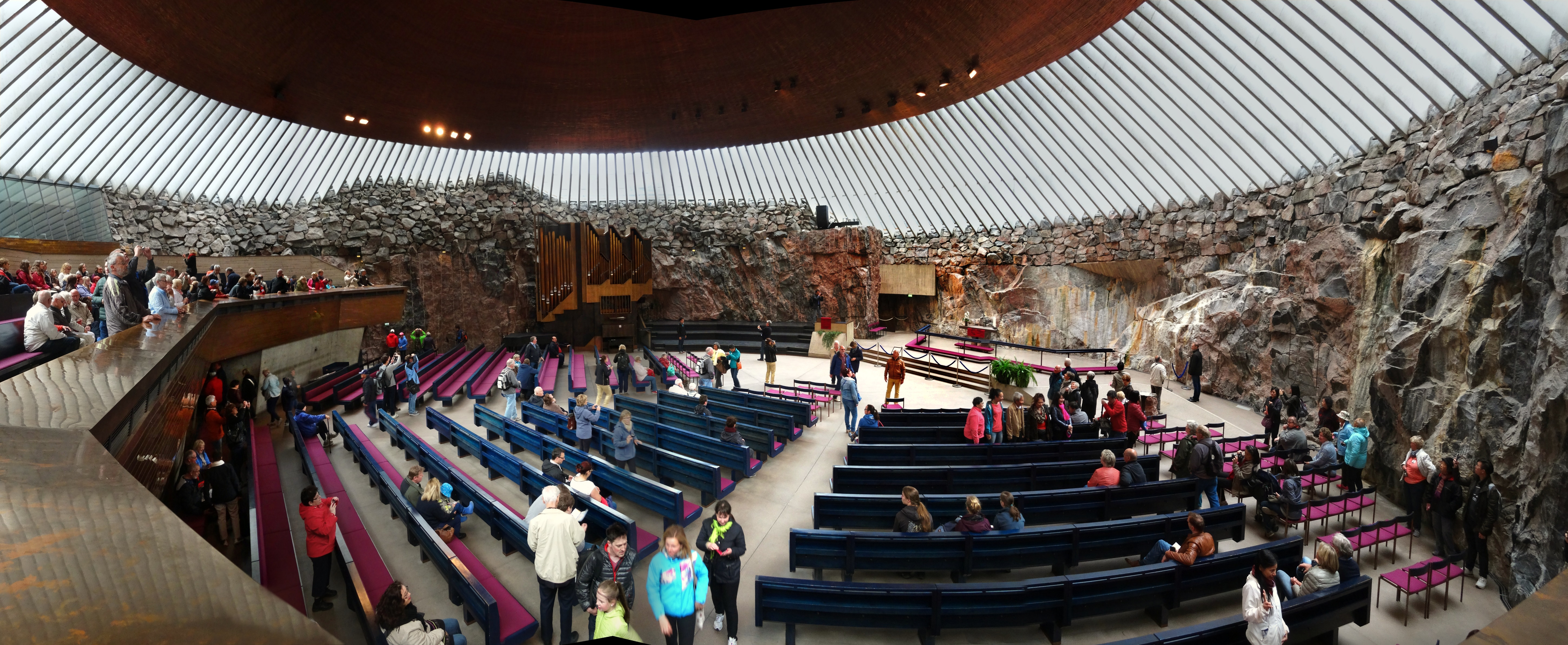
- Interior of Rock Church as seen from the balcony.
- Temppeliaukio church
- Location: Töölö, Helsinki
- Country: Finland
- Denomination: Evangelical Lutheran Church of Finland

History
- Status: Active

Architecture
- Architect(s): Timo Suomalainen; Tuomo Suomalainen
- Groundbreaking: February 1968
- Completed: 1969

Specifications
- Capacity: 750

Administration
- Diocese: Helsinki diocese
- Parish: Töölö

Temppeliaukio Church (Finnish: Temppeliaukion kirkko; Swedish: Tempelplatsens kyrka), also known as the Church of the Rock or Rock Church, is an Evangelical Lutheran church in the Töölö district of Helsinki, Finland. Designed by architect brothers Timo and Tuomo Suomalainen, the church was completed in 1969 and is built directly into the natural granite bedrock of Temppeliaukio (“Temple Square”). The church has approximately 750 seats and functions both as an active parish church and as a concert venue and tourist attraction.

The church is notable for its integration of architecture and natural geology. Rather than constructing a conventional church on top of the rocky site, the architects excavated the main church hall into the bedrock and retained much of the surrounding rock. The interior is covered by a copper-lined dome surrounded by a broad ring of skylights, which provides natural illumination. The combination of exposed granite, copper, reinforced concrete and natural light has made the church one of the best-known examples of Finnish modernist sacred architecture.

The building is also one of Helsinki's principal tourist attractions. Before the COVID-19 pandemic it regularly attracted hundreds of thousands of visitors annually, reaching a record 938,000 visitors in 2019. Temppeliaukio Church is both an active Lutheran church and a major tourist attraction. It is used for regular worship and for religious ceremonies including weddings, christenings and funerals, while its distinctive acoustics also make it a popular venue for concerts and other musical events.

== History and architecture ==
The site has been intended for a public or religious building since the early development of Etu-Töölö. The 1906 town plan for the district already designated the rocky hill later known as Temppeliaukio as a potential site for a church. In 1929, the City of Helsinki transferred the plot for use as a church site, subject to construction beginning within three years.

Early competitions

The first architectural competition for the church was held in the early 1930s. The competition did not produce a proposal that the organizers considered suitable for implementation, and the first prize was left unawarded.

A second competition was organized in 1936. Many of the proposals envisaged a conventional monumental church, frequently incorporating a tower on the dominant street axis. The competition also failed to produce a first-prize design for immediate implementation. The commission was eventually given to architect J. S. Sirén, whose proposal had received third prize in the competition.

Sirén's design was considerably more monumental than the building eventually constructed. Construction began in November 1939, but work was interrupted only a few days later by the outbreak of the Winter War between Finland and the Soviet Union on 30 November 1939. The project was subsequently abandoned during the Second World War and its aftermath.

The interruption had long-term consequences for the project. After the war, Finland faced more urgent reconstruction needs, and the construction of the church was postponed. The growth and reorganization of Helsinki's parishes in the 1950s and 1960s eventually revived the project, as the newly established Taivallahti parish needed its own church.

The 1961 competition

A third architectural competition was organized in 1961 and was won by the brothers Timo and Tuomo Suomalainen with their proposal Kivikirkko (“Stone Church”).

The Suomalainens' proposal differed radically from the earlier monumental schemes. Instead of occupying the center of the square with a large above-ground structure, the design placed the church within the existing rock formation. The main church hall would be excavated into the granite, while parish facilities would be arranged around the edges of the rocky hill. The concept allowed the open, rocky character of Temppeliaukio to remain visible rather than replacing it with a conventional monumental building.

The original competition proposal was subsequently scaled down substantially for economic reasons. The interior was reduced to approximately one-quarter of the size presented in the original proposal. The project nevertheless retained its central architectural idea: the church would be excavated into the bedrock and the rock itself would form the principal interior wall surface.

The decision to build the church was controversial. During the 1960s there was considerable opposition in Finland to expensive and monumental church construction. The project was criticized in public debate for its cost and unconventional appearance. The building became particularly controversial because the final cost was approximately four million Finnish marks; contemporary accounts also cited approximately 3.5 million marks during the construction period. The decision to proceed was eventually settled by a very narrow vote in the joint church council, with the chairman's vote proving decisive. The controversy reflected a wider debate about whether substantial resources should be devoted to a new church at a time when there were competing social and humanitarian needs.

Construction and opening

Construction began in February 1968. The church was completed approximately one and a half years later and was consecrated in September 1969. It was initially known as Taivallahden kirkko (Taivallahti Church). In 1971, its name was officially changed to Temppeliaukion kirkko (Temppeliaukio Church), after the square on which it stands.

The church attracted visitors almost immediately after opening. Approximately 100,000 people visited during its first autumn, demonstrating that the building had already begun to function as a major public attraction in addition to its religious purpose.

Biafra protest

The building also became a site of political protest during its construction. On the nights of 16 and 17 July 1968, a group of Christian students painted the word “BIAFRA” in large letters on several parts of the unfinished building. The action referred to the Biafran War and the famine in Biafra, which had declared independence from Nigeria in 1967. The students argued that money being spent on an expensive new church could instead have been used to help people suffering from famine and poverty. The graffiti was subsequently removed although one of the Biafra paintings has been preserved in the church's basement, but it is not accessible to the public.

Architecture

The central architectural concept of Temppeliaukio Church is the preservation and incorporation of the natural granite bedrock. The main church hall was excavated into the rock, while a substantial part of the original rocky hill was retained. The design consequently creates an unusual transition between landscape and architecture, with the natural rock forming the walls of the interior.

The church hall is approximately circular in plan. Its interior walls consist largely of exposed bedrock and roughly quarried stone. The roof is formed by a large copper-lined dome, supported by radial reinforced-concrete beams. Between the dome and the rock walls is a broad glazed zone consisting of approximately 180 windows, through which daylight enters the church.

The dome appears to float above the irregular rock walls. The contrast between the geometric copper structure and the irregular granite gives the interior much of its characteristic visual effect. The color scheme of the furnishings and interior materials was designed to complement the natural tones of the granite.

The architecture also incorporates natural processes. Water entering through fissures in the bedrock is channeled away through drainage systems in the floor, allowing the building to remain physically integrated with the surrounding geological formation.

The exposed rock serves also an acoustic purpose. In the original design, the Suomalainen brothers planned to cover the rock with a smooth concrete surface, concerned that leaving it exposed would be considered too unconventional by the competition jury. During the development of the project, conductor Paavo Berglund and acoustical engineer Mauri Parjo drew attention to the acoustic advantages of uneven surfaces. This led the architects to retain the natural rock walls, which became a defining feature of the church's interior and acoustics.

The church's organ was built in 1975 by Finnish organ builder Veikko Virtanen. It has 43 stops, four manuals and a pedalboard. There are no traditional bells at Temppeliaukio Church. Instead, a recording of bells composed by Taneli Kuusisto is played through loudspeakers on the exterior wall.

Religious, cultural and tourist use

Temppeliaukio Church remains an active Lutheran parish church rather than functioning solely as an architectural monument. It is used for regular Sunday worship as well as weddings, christenings, funerals and other parish activities. During such ceremonies the church is closed to sightseeing visitors.

The building's distinctive acoustics have also made it a significant concert venue. Concerts include choral, vocal, instrumental and other musical performances, as well as seasonal and special events.

Temppeliaukio Church is one of Helsinki's most visited tourist attractions. Visitor numbers reached a historic peak immediatelybefore the COVID-19 pandemic. In 2019, the church recorded 938,000 visitors, the highest annual figure in its history.

In 2025, Temppeliaukio Church ranked fourth among Helsinki's tourist attractions by visitor numbers, with approximately half a million visitors, after Linnanmäki Amusement Park, Suomenlinna and Korkeasaari Zoo.

The church currently charges an entrance fee during sightseeing hours. The standard admission price is €8 for adults. Admission is free for people under 18 and members of Töölö Parish. Attendance at religious services is free.

Recognition and architectural significance

Temppeliaukio Church has become an internationally recognized work of Finnish modernist architecture. Its architectural significance lies particularly in its integration of a functioning church with the existing geological landscape and in the unusual structural relationship between the excavated granite walls and the lightweight-looking copper dome.

The building was formally protected in 2004. The Finnish Heritage Agency's register records the protection decision of 8 June 2004, made by the Church Council under the applicable church-protection procedure.

The church is also included in DOCOMOMO Finland's selection of important modernist architectural and environmental sites. DOCOMOMO (International Committee for Documentation and Conservation of Buildings, Sites and Neighbourhoods of the Modern Movement) identifies the church as significant modern sacred architecture and emphasizes the preservation of its bedrock, its copper-lined dome, its natural lighting and its distinctive relationship between geological and constructed forms.

== Gallery ==
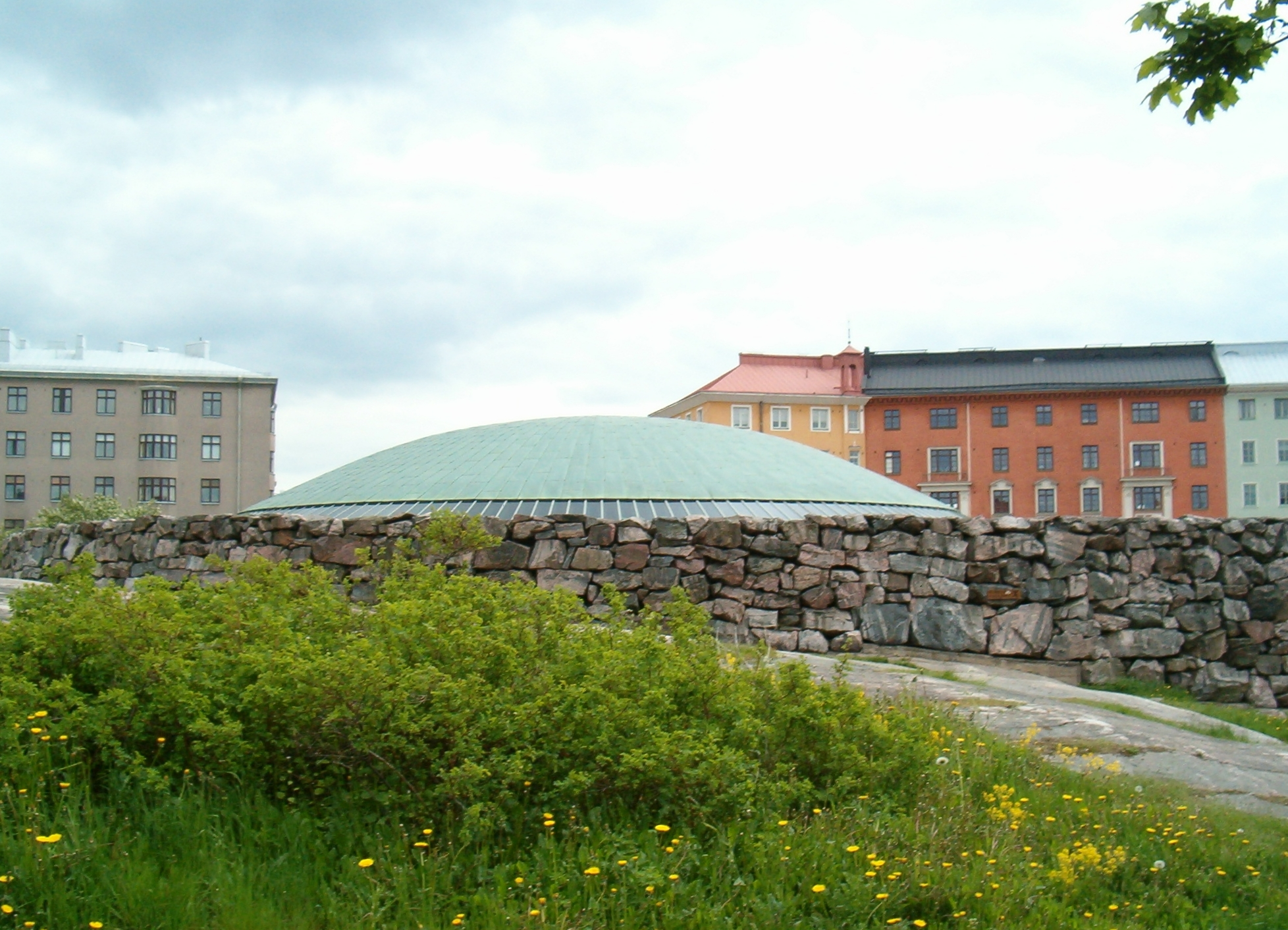
The copper dome roof of the church

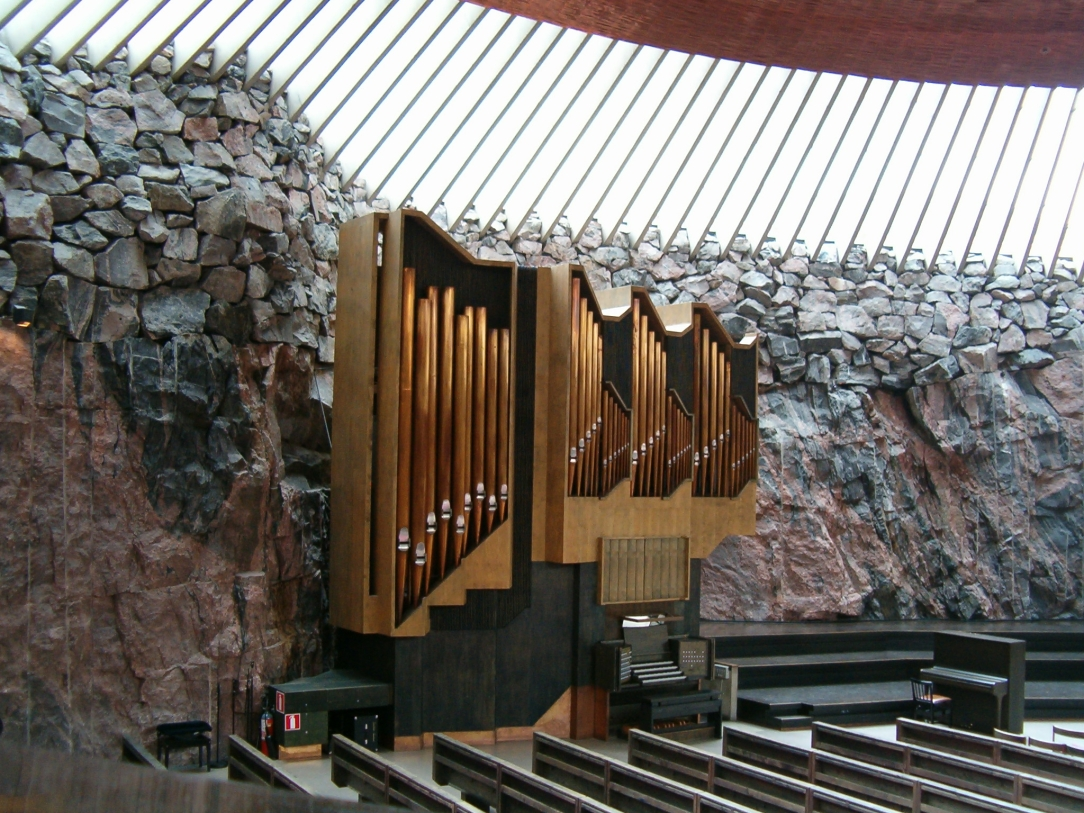
Pipe organ from the balcony

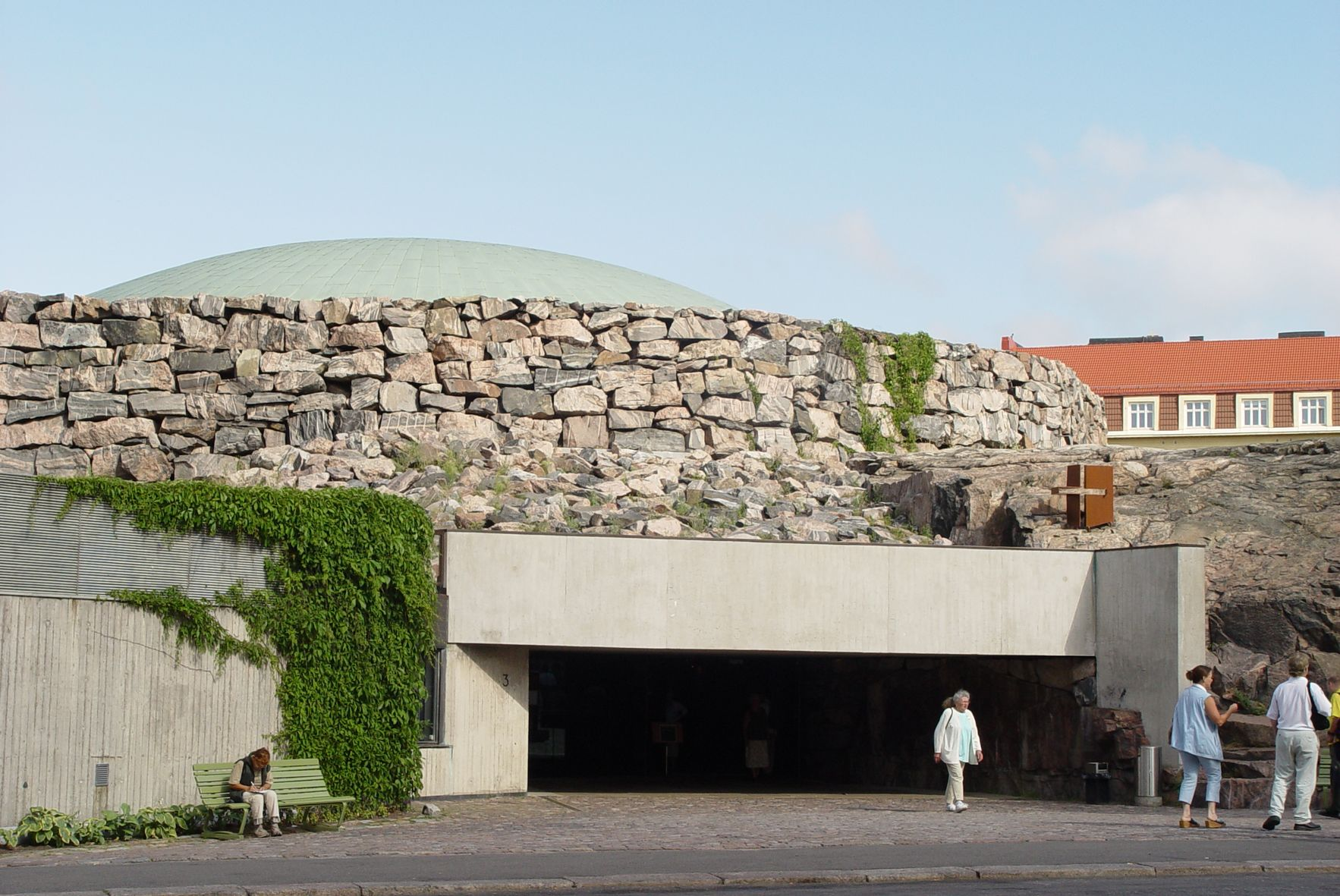
Entrance to the church

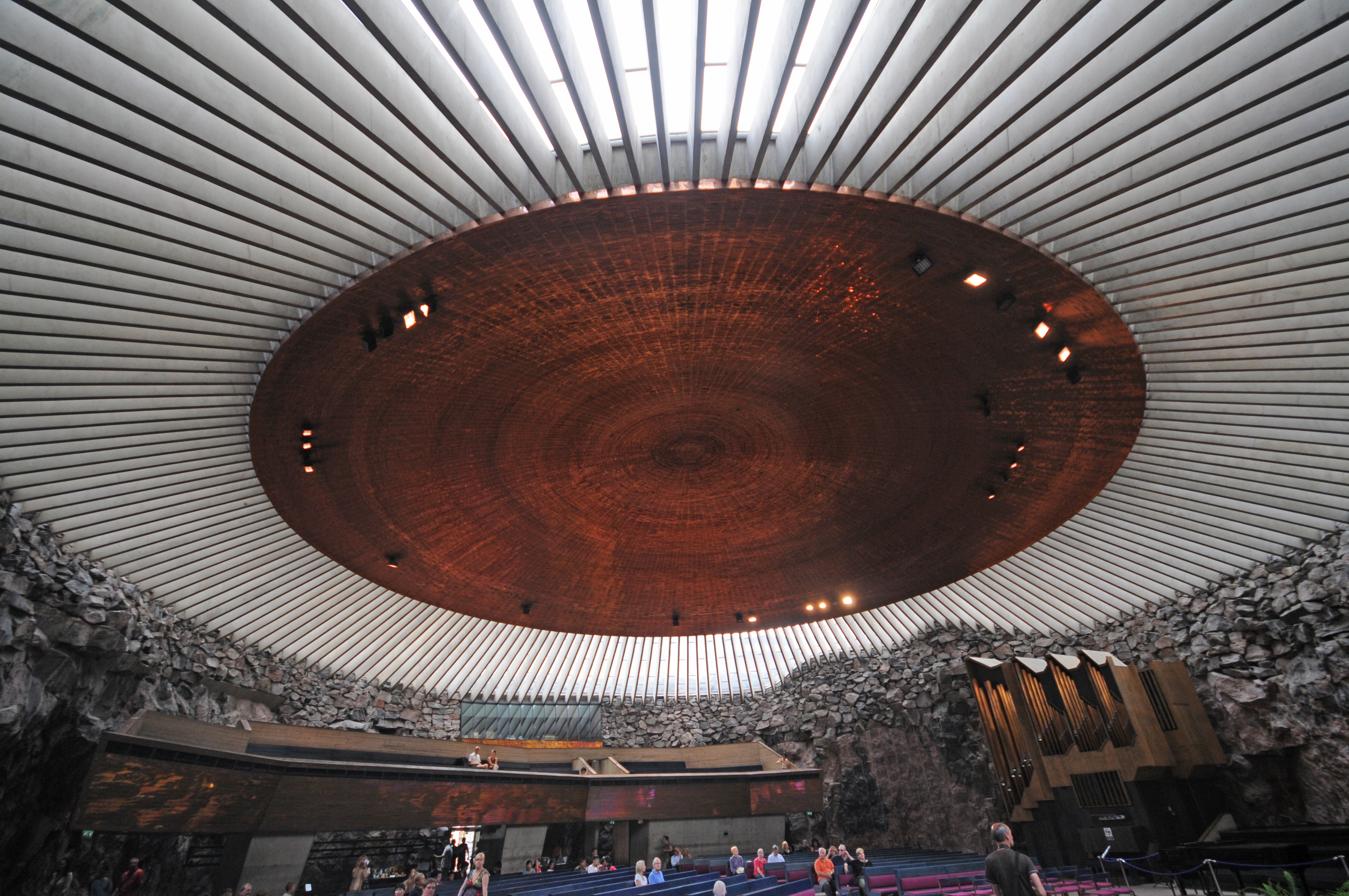
Underside of the copper church roof

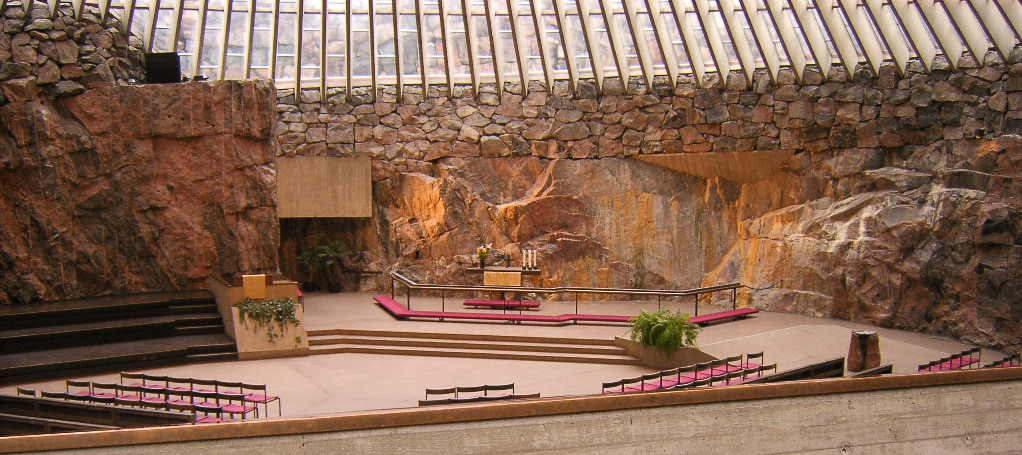
An ice-age crevice used as the altarpiece

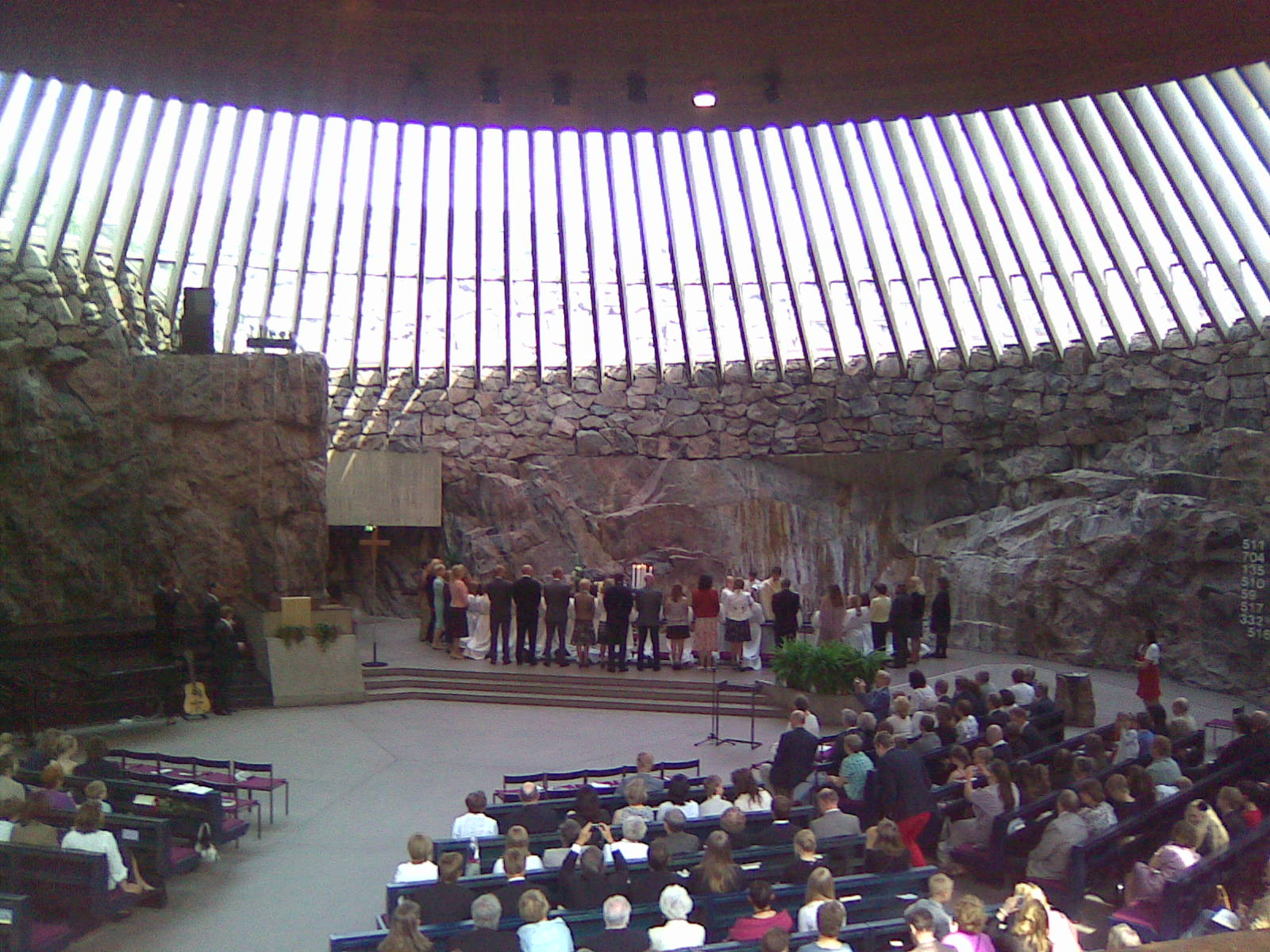
A Lutheran confirmation service

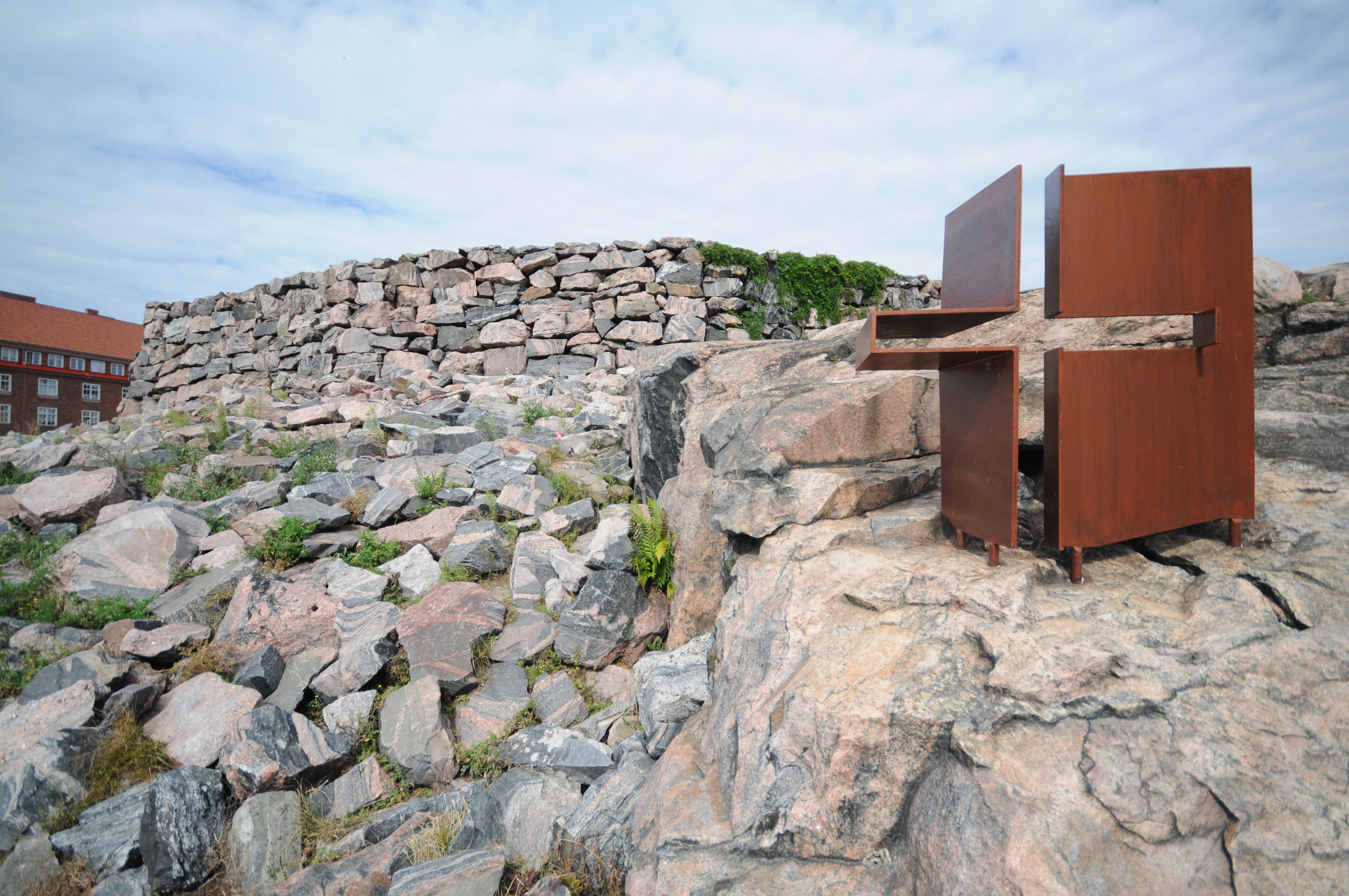
Detail of the entrance
