= Irma (steamship) =

Steamship which sank in 1911

The Irma was a steamship which sank on July 14, 1911 at Port Limón, Costa Rica after a collision with the Steamship Diamante. Loss of life approximately 39 (32 passengers and 7 crew- Warren Evening Mirror). The accident occurred in the estuary of the St. John river where both vessels were maneuvering during a violent storm. The accident occurred at 8:00 p.m. local time. The Diamante's bow struck the Irma's midship forcing her nose deep inside the Irma's hull. The Irma was en route to Greytown.
