= Irmela Mensah-Schramm =

Anti-Nazi activist

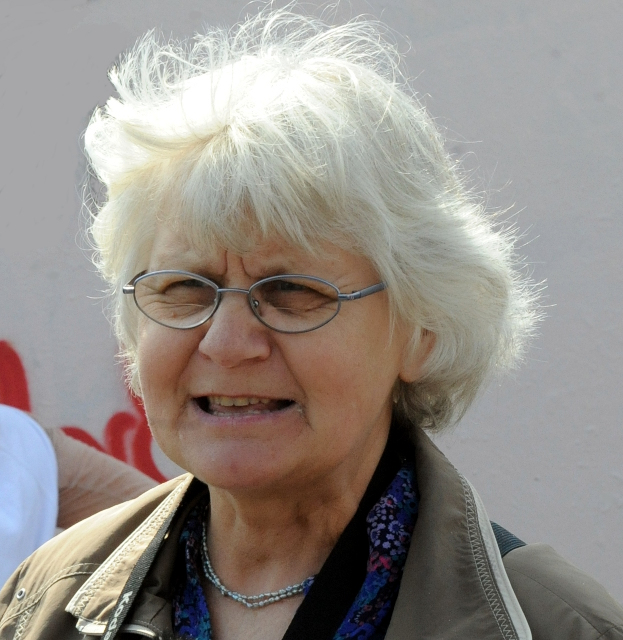
- Mensah-Schramm in 2013
- Born: December 5, 1945 (age 80); Stuttgart, American occupation zone in Germany
- Other name: Graffiti Grandma
- Occupation: Special needs teacher
- Years active: 1986 – present
- Known for: Anti–Nazi graffiti
- Movement: Anti-fascism

Irmela Mensah-Schramm (born December 5, 1945) is a human rights activist and retired special needs teacher known for removing and painting over neo-Nazi and other right-wing extremist graffiti in Berlin and throughout Germany.

She began doing this work in 1986 after seeing a sticker at a bus stop near her home in Berlin demanding the release of Nazi war criminal Rudolf Hess. Shocked when she returned and found that no one had removed it, she decided to scrape it away with her keychain. After this incident, she began to notice neo-Nazi and right-wing extremist graffiti wherever she went, and resolved to make removing it part of her daily routine. As of 2021, she had removed at least 90,000 stickers, with many of these preserved in binders for posterity, and effaced at least 10,000 spray-painted messages or symbols. According to the New York Times, "Over her 30 years of scraping, dissolving and painting over far-right slogans, she estimates she has been assaulted three or four times. But, she said, she has also been hugged by strangers and thanked."

In October 2019, Mensah-Schramm was found guilty of property damage and fined after being photographed painting over neo-Nazi slogans and reported to the police. According to Deutsche Welle, she "refused an offer by the judge to avoid a trial if she donated €500 to non-profit groups, saying it would mean legally admitting she did something wrong." Mensah-Schramm was later acquitted of the charge upon appeal.

Mensah-Schramm has been increasingly recognized for her work since beginning to receive global media attention in the early 2000s. She has been awarded the Order of Merit of the Federal Republic of Germany among numerous other awards. Her extensive collection of neo-Nazi stickers which she has removed was placed on exhibition at the German Historical Museum in Berlin in 2016. As of October 2024, Mensah-Schramm was still active.

== Background ==
Mensah-Schramm was born in 1945 in Stuttgart, Germany, and moved to Berlin in 1967, where she began teaching students with severe disabilities. In the 1960s she also became involved in the anti-nuclear movement.

== Methods ==
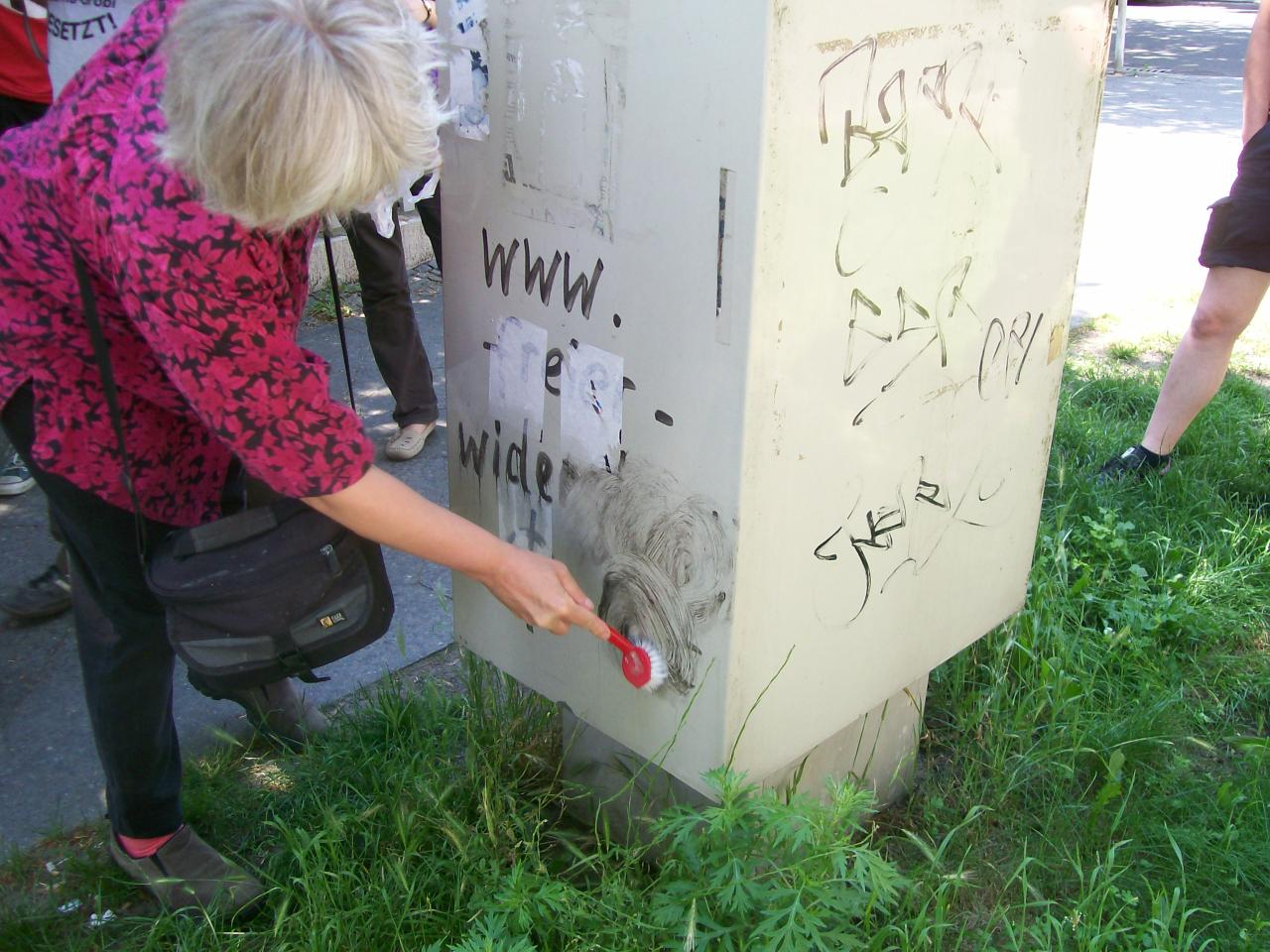
Mensah-Schramm removing graffiti in Berlin

Though her work began with the simple removal of a sticker with a keychain, over the years Mensah-Schramm has adopted numerous methods to excise, cover over, and alter the hate speech she encounters, including nail polish remover, a variety of scrapers, and spray paint.

Some of her alterations involve humorous wordplay. In one instance where vandals had written "foreigners to the gas chamber" she altered the text to read "foreigners to the fun chamber" (in German "fun" rhymes with "gas"). Since 2015, when an influx of refugees aroused anger against German Chancellor Angela Merkel, Mensah-Schramm has frequently altered graffiti reading "Merkel must go" (Merkel muss weg) to read "Remember! Away with hate" (Merke! Hass weg).

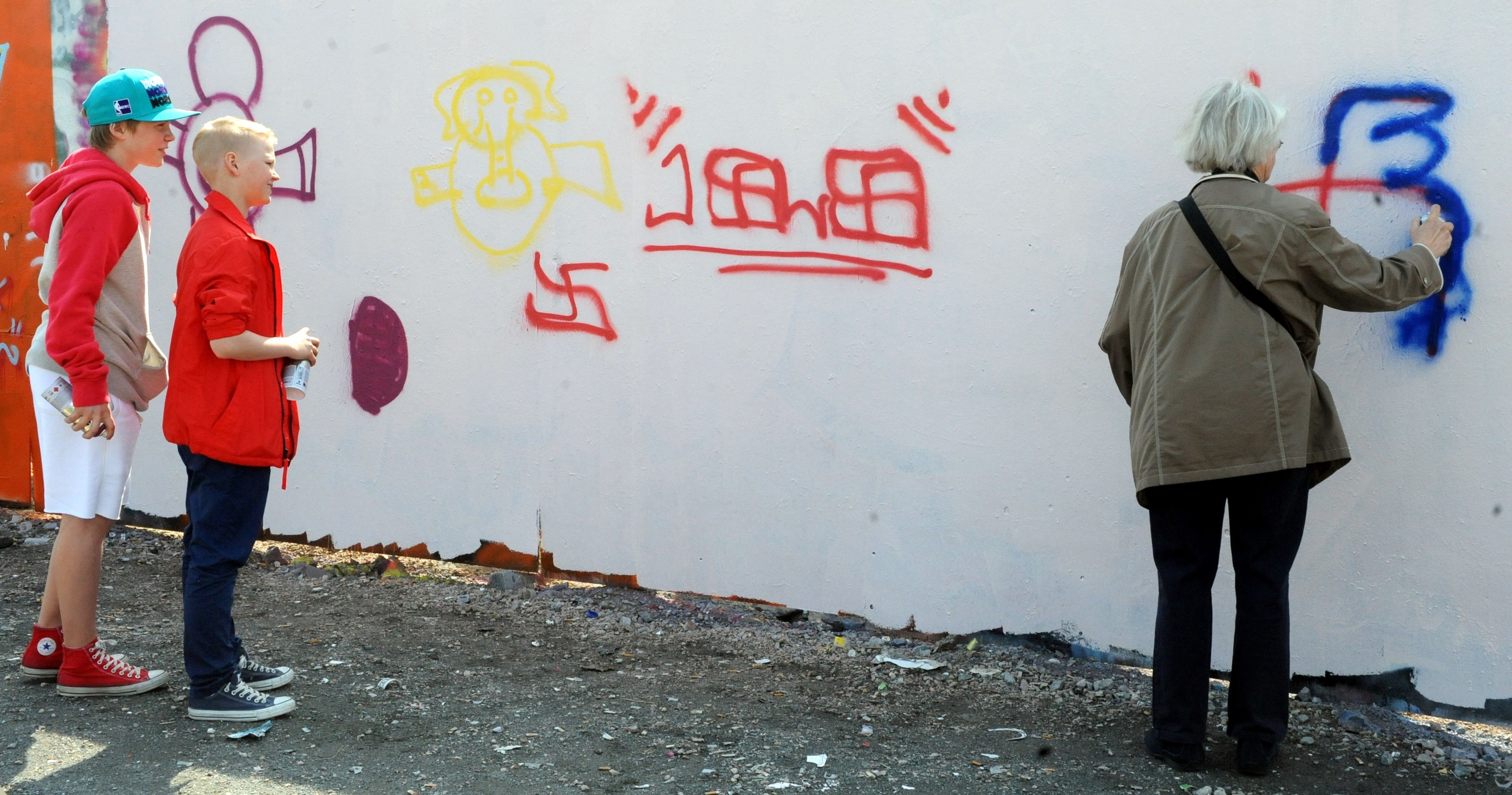
Mensah-Schramm at a graffiti workshop in Helsinki

Mensah-Schramm documents her graffiti effacement photographically, and preserves these photos along with removed stickers in binders. As of 2016, she had filled 82 such binders. These were exhibited in a room devoted to her work at the German Historical Museum as part of a 2016 exhibition titled "Instigated: Anti-Semitic and Racist Stickers from 1880 to Today". Her first exhibition of this type of material was at the Zehlendorf town hall in Berlin in 1995.

She also runs educational workshops that teach children and teenagers how to intervene creatively to efface neo-Nazi or other right-wing extremist graffiti when they encounter it.
