= Irman (name) =

Male given name

- Gender: Male

Other gender
- Feminine: Irma

Other names
- Variant form: Irmin

Irman is a male given name and a surname.

As a given name, Irman is used by Bosniaks in the former Yugoslav nations. It is used as the male version of Irma. It is also used by Indonesians.

Notable people with this name include:

== Given name ==
- Irman Gusman (born 1962), Indonesian politician and businessman

== Surname ==
- Firdaus Irman (born 2001), Malaysian footballer
- Neli Irman (born 1986), Slovenian handball player
- Regina Irman (born 1957), Swiss musician, music educator, and composer

== See also ==
- Irman, village in Iran
