= Regina Irman =

Swiss musician

Regina Irman (born 22 March 1957) is a Swiss musician, music educator and composer. She has written commissions for a number of Swiss cultural institutions. She teaches at the Pädagogischen Hochschule Thurgau. She composes solo pieces, chamber music, choral works and music for theater. She was awarded the Landis & Gyr Stiftung Residency in London in 2007.

== Early life ==
Regina Irman was born in Winterthur, Switzerland. In 1976 she studied music at the Winterthur Conservatory, and in 1982 received her teacher's diploma with guitar as principal instrument. She also began to study percussion, and in 1995 received a concert diploma with distinction for percussion. Irman has studied under Roland Moser, Peter Streiff and Robert Rudisuli.

Her first compositions were made while she was studying the guitar, and after 1983 she composed for a number of commissions, including the City of Zurich, the cultural foundation Pro Helvetia, the Women's Congress of Bern, the Swiss Youth Music Competition, and various ensembles. She spent a sabbatical year in Zurich, and has performed in Switzerland, Germany, Italy, France and Ukraine. She also works as a drummer and instrumental teacher. She is a lecturer at the Pädagogischen Hochschule Thurgau. She was awarded the Landis & Gyr Stiftung Residency in London in 2007, which is a residency for Swiss artists and cultural professionals with a track record of achievement.

== Works ==
Irman has composed solo pieces, chamber music, choral works, and for music theater. Her works have been described as having a "tendency towards a brittle form of humour".

Selected works include:

- Hill at Ceret (1983) for 2 violas and double bass
- Speculum (1984) for 4 clarinets in Eb, percussion (2), Sisyphus machine, mirrors and colored lights backdrop
- From reflective ice (1984) for four clarinets
- Floor (los) (1985) for three violins
- Melody 1 (1985) for quarter-tone guitar or other instruments with a clear intonation possibility
- Melody 2 (1985) for Untertonflöte or other instruments
- A dada = foreign songs sheet (1985–1986) Based on texts by Adolf Wolfli (mezzo-soprano) and piano
- Piano songs, which deal with misunderstanding of the Swiss.
- Wind Chimes (1986) for piano
- Numbers (1986) for piano
- A Funeral March (1987) trio for percussion and spoken voice
- Black Happiness (1988–1989) for partially prepared piano
- Passacaglia (1989–1990) for Clarinet in A
- Chopin in the vertical (1991) for speaker, piano, timpani and tapes
- Requiem to the Death "(1991-1993) for 25 women's voices, text: Akhmatova
- Masquerade (1993)Eight pieces for mixed choir
- Mirror Dance (1993) for 2 recorders and drums
- Words (1995) Saxophone Ensemble and percussion
- Association Office (1995) for solo percussion (chimes, cymbals and metal objects)
- "... Like a grasshopper on the seas ..." (1995–1996) for large mixed chorus and tape strips
- Table with bird feet (1996) for tape alone
- Five speech-sound-objects (1996) for solo percussion (vibraphone, percussion Klein, speaking) Based on texts by Sonja Sekula.
- Subjects (1996) for piano four hands
- Three Dances (1996–1997) for soprano, speaking voice/ piano, clarinet and accordion Text: Anna Akhmatova
- Sculptures (for Bruce Naumann) (1997) for quarter-tone-viol quartet
- Otto mane (1999) for speaker, soprano, piano and bass drum text: ETA Hoffmann
- Orfeo (1999–2000) for 5 players (also version for tape)
- Surdina (1999–2000) for alto solo Texts: Cecilia Meireles
- Black happiness 2 (1990–2001) for percussion quartet
- Landscapes (2003) Five Pieces for percussion sextet 1. Snow landscape, 2. Frost flowers, 3. Mechanical landscape, cut up, 4. Eisgitter, amorphous, 5. Mechanical landscape, rotating
- Ten short pieces based on themes by Bach and Biber (2004) for (baroque) violin solo
- According to Fields (2006–2007) for 8 women's voices with percussion and light sources
- Lines (2006–2007) for 2 soprano trombones and 2 alto trombones
