= Irma La Pierre =

American actress

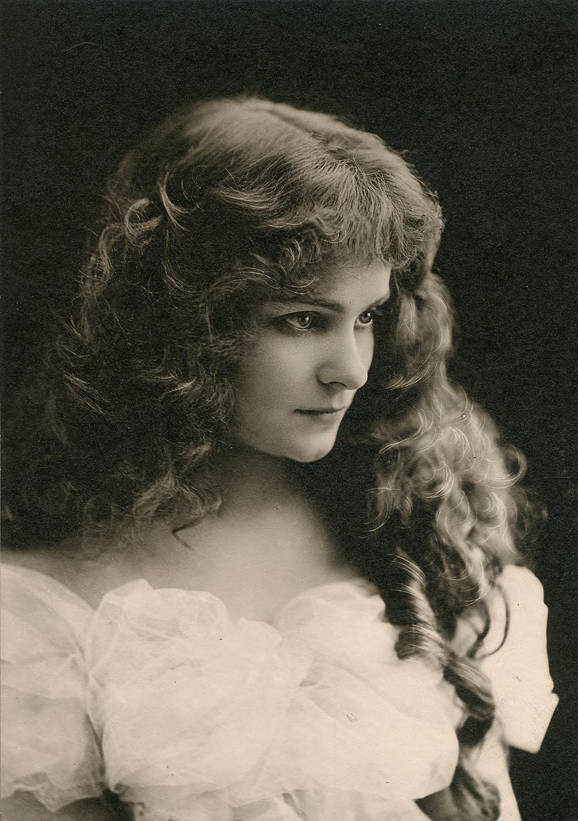
- Irma La Pierre, c. 1905
- Born: November 10, 1881; Chicago, Illinois, U.S.
- Died: October 9, 1951 (aged 69); New York, New York, U.S.
- Other names: Irma Lapierre, Irma Thompson
- Occupation: actress

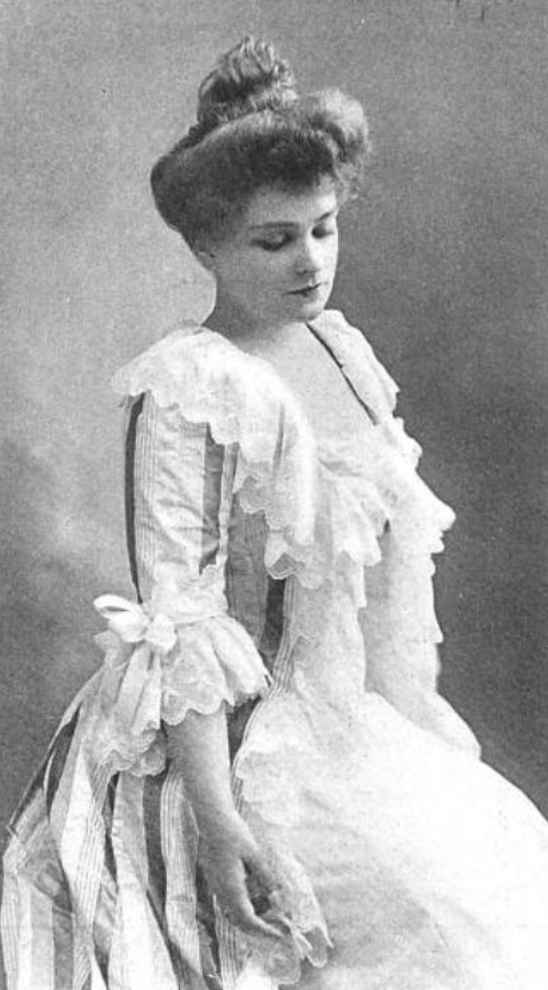
Irma La Pierre, from a 1909 publication, photographed by Sarony

Irma La Pierre (November 10, 1881 – October 9, 1951) was an American actress, active on the stage before World War I.

== Early life ==
La Pierre was born in Chicago, the daughter of Lotta La Pierre.

== Career ==
La Pierre began working on the New York stage in her teens, starting with Augustin Daly's company. Her stage credits included roles in London Assurance, The School for Scandal, The Geisha, Lili-Tse, Circus Girl, Wedded and Parted (1903), The Plainsman (1905), Way Down East (1906), When Old New York Was Dutch (1909), The Iron King (1910), Metz in Ireland (1910), Seven Days (1911), and The College Widow. On Broadway she appeared in The Bonnie Brier Bush (1901), Skipper & Co., Wall Street (1903), The Village Lawyer (1908), and Up and Down Broadway (1910). She acted in one silent film, Tess of the D'Urbervilles (1913), which starred Minnie Maddern Fiske in the title role.

La Pierre was considered a fashionable stage beauty. Her facial features and proportions were analyzed for insights into her character for a 1913 magazine feature: "The smallness of the back of the head indicates that the coarser passions are conspicuous by their absence," according to physiognomist Annie Isabella Oppenheim. Later in life, she managed a rooming house at 255 West 108th Street in New York City.

== Personal life ==
La Pierre married actor Franklin Hallett Thompson by 1914. His father was Massachusetts politician Charles Perkins Thompson. The Thompsons were separated but "on friendly terms" when he died by suicide in 1938. She died in 1951, at the age of 69, in New York City. Soon after, some of her papers were donated to the New York Public Library.
