= Erma =

Erma or ERMA may refer to:

== People ==
- Erma Bergmann (1924–2015), All-American Girls Professional Baseball League pitcher and outfielder
- Erma Bombeck (1927–1996), American humorist and newspaper columnist
- Erma Franklin (1938–2002), American soul, rhythm and blues, and pop singer
- Erma Henderson (1917–2009), American politician and civil rights activist
- Erma Perham Proetz (1891–1944), American advertising executive and the first woman inducted into the Advertising Hall of Fame
- Erma Vizenor (born 1944), American politician and educator

== Geography ==
- Erma Knoll, a peak in upper Huron Glacier, Livingston Island, Antarctica
- Erma, New Jersey, a census-designated place and unincorporated area
- Erma Reka (village), a village in southern Bulgaria
- Jerma (river) or Erma River, in southeastern Serbia and western Bulgaria

== Literature ==
- Erma (webtoon), an American webcomic series by Brandon Santiago

== Acronym ==
- Electronic Recording Machine, Accounting, an early computer technology
- Environmental Response Management Application, a geographic Information System developed by the U.S. National Oceanic and Atmospheric Administration (NOAA)
- Environmental Risk Management Authority, a former New Zealand government body
- Erma Werke, Erfurter Maschinenfabrik B. Geipel GmbH, a now defunct German weapon manufacturer
- Ernest Read Music Association, a group founded in honour of Ernest Read to encourage musical educational activities in the UK
- Emergency Recovery Management Agreements, a temporary concession-based replacement for Passenger rail franchising in Great Britain from September 20th 2020

== See also ==
- Irma (disambiguation)
