= Operation Irma =

1993 airlifts of civilians from Bosnia and Herzegovina

Operation Irma was the name applied to a series of airlifts of injured civilians from Bosnia and Herzegovina during the siege of Sarajevo. The airlifts were initiated after the wounding of five-year-old Irma Hadžimuratović attracted international media attention. The programme was reported to have evacuated hundreds of Sarajevans during the second half of 1993, but attracted significant controversy concerning its scale, evacuee selection criteria, and the motivations of the western European governments and press that inspired it.

== Wounding of Irma Hadžimuratović ==
=== Siege of Sarajevo ===
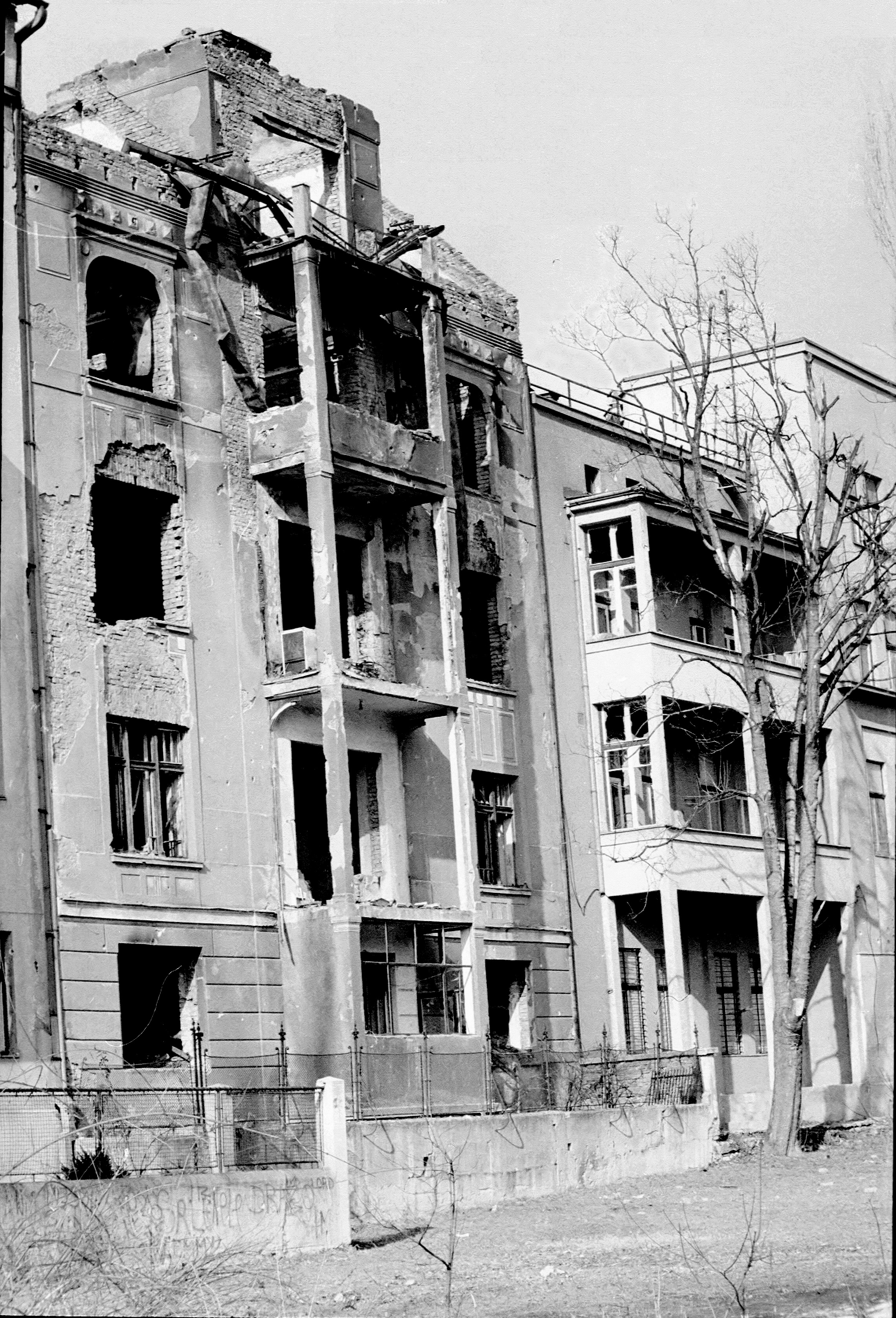
Shelled buildings in Sarajevo

The Bosnian War erupted in March 1992, following Bosnia and Hercegovina's declaration of independence from the Socialist Federal Republic of Yugoslavia. In April 1992, Bosnian Serb forces, representing the Republika Srpska and the Yugoslav People's Army, took up positions in the areas surrounding the Bosnian capital Sarajevo and initiated a siege that was to last for four years. The siege was characterized by sniper fire and shelling directed at the city's buildings and infrastructure and at civilian residents of the city. Reports showed that between the beginning of the siege and November 1992, an average of eight persons were killed and 44 wounded in Sarajevo per day.

=== July 1993 marketplace mortar ===
On 30 July 1993, a mortar shell fired by Bosnian Serb troops hit a Sarajevo neighbourhood, injuring five-year-old Irma Hadžimuratović and killing several others, including her mother. Sarajevo's overstretched Koševo hospital was unable to provide adequate treatment for the injuries Irma received to her spine, head and abdomen. She developed bacterial meningitis as a result. Edo Jaganjac, the surgeon treating Hadžimuratović, tried unsuccessfully to have her evacuated on a UN relief flight. He then resorted to distributing her photograph among foreign journalists in Sarajevo. Several picked up Irma's story, giving it widespread coverage in the international (and especially the British) press. On the evening of 8 August, BBC News led with coverage of Irma's injuries. On 9 August, British Prime Minister John Major personally intervened, dispatching an RAF Hercules to airlift Irma to London's Great Ormond Street Hospital.

=== Commencement of "Operation Irma" ===
In the following days and months dozens more Bosnians were evacuated under a programme the UK media dubbed "Operation Irma". During the week beginning on 9 August, 41 people were taken out of Sarajevo. It was reported later that hundreds were eventually evacuated under the programme. Other countries, including Sweden and Ireland, organized further airlifts, and the Czech Republic, Finland, France, Italy, Norway, and Poland also offered hospital beds.

== Reaction and criticism ==
Though Operation Irma was widely publicized, and was reported in September 1993 to have raised £1 million in donations to evacuate the wounded from Sarajevo, it attracted a number of criticisms. These addressed the operation's limited scale, the motives of the British press and foreign governments in launching the airlifts, the devotion of resources to evacuation instead of supplying material support to local medical services, and the broader issue of the United Kingdom's response to the war in Bosnia.

=== Criticisms over scale ===
Some critics focused on the small numbers of persons evacuated via the operation. During August 1993 the violence in Bosnia killed on average three children each day, and thousands of others were injured or made homeless. Between the beginning of the siege on 5 April 1992 and the first airlifts under Operation Irma the United Nations High Commissioner for Refugees (UNHCR) had approved only 200 of Sarajevo's 50,000 critically wounded patients for medical evacuation. By 15 August, the British press storm had prompted offers of 1250 hospital beds in 17 countries; though a vast increase on prior offers of help, the total was dwarfed by the estimated 39,000 children requiring hospital treatment throughout Bosnia.

=== The "supermarket" argument ===
As well as the scale of the response, critics questioned the criteria against which patients were selected for evacuation. At first the UK was challenged over its decision to include only children in the transports while tens of thousands of adults remained wounded in the city. Sylvana Foa, spokesperson for the UNHCR, commented that Sarajevo should not be regarded as a "supermarket" of photogenic potential refugees, asking "Does this mean Britain only wants to help children? Maybe it only wants children under six, or blond children, or blue-eyed children?" Patrick Peillod, head of the United Nations medical evacuation committee, said that the UK had treated Bosnian children "like animals in a zoo" and was trying to pick and choose evacuees to suit a public relations agenda. When the government revised its approach and included adults on flights out of the city, claims were made that wounded combatants had been among those taken to the UK, Sweden, and Italy, and that patients had paid bribes to be included in the transports.

UK Foreign Minister Douglas Hurd, on 9 August, countered that though the operation would evacuate relatively few of the city's wounded, it was still a benefit: "Because you can't help everybody, it doesn't mean you shouldn't help somebody." Sylvana Foa also later acknowledged that, after months of Western European indifference toward the war in the former Yugoslavia, the new public sympathy inspired by Irma's case was "like day following night."

=== Criticisms of the British government and press ===
Beyond these questions of scale and selection, the motives of both the British press and the government in publicizing Hadzimuratovic's case and then in launching Operation Irma were challenged. Some critics disparaged as hypocritical the sudden intensity of coverage devoted to a single victim of what was already a protracted siege. In December 1993 another Sarajevo evacuation program, 'Operation Angel,' received minimal press coverage in the UK, and the Financial Times suggested that such human interest stories captured the popular imagination only during the British press's summer 'silly season' when Parliament was in recess. Susan Douglas, in the October 1993 edition of American magazine The Progressive, said British papers had indulged in "a ghoulish competition to scoop each other over Irma's condition and to use her evacuation to salve British guilt about standing apart from the carnage in Bosnia."

The British government was widely depicted as having launched Operation Irma in direct response to the level of press interest. Rescuers themselves joked that "Operation IRMA" was an acronym for "Instant Response to Media Attention." A Council of Europe publication later noted that European governments had been criticized for regarding the exercise as having "more to do with a political and media operation than with humanitarian relief." The mission also received some criticism in the domestic press: Mark Lawson in The Independent called prime minister Major's efforts with the mission a "failure ... to silence the hostile snipers" based on a misunderstanding of popular indecision about Bosnia and on a failure to manage domestic press skepticism.

Meanwhile, within the former Yugoslavia, Operation Irma was regarded as evidence that the British government had taken sides in the conflict, favouring Bosnian Muslims over Croats or Serbs.

=== Evacuation or local treatment? ===
Some UN aid workers immediately criticized the operation, arguing that very sick children were poorly served by programmes that obliged them to travel hundreds of miles. They argued, too, that with costs of around £100,000 per evacuated child the programme was devouring funds that could have been used to improve local facilities and treatment. The head of Kosevo Hospital's plastic surgery department said "It would be much better if you sent the tools to do our jobs properly than for you to make a big show of a few token evacuations." Countering this, A.D. Redmond of the Overseas Development Administration (the predecessor to the Department for International Development) wrote in November 1993 to the British Medical Journal:

The Overseas Development Administration has been foremost in supplying medical and humanitarian aid to the people of Bosnia throughout the conflict ... In some circumstances medical teams are needed, requested, and supplied, but in others medical supplies alone are the most appropriate form of aid. I have also, however, received personal pleas from doctors whom I know well to evacuate patients who cannot be treated in Sarajevo ... No solution will suffice. We are all trying to help.

== Aftermath ==
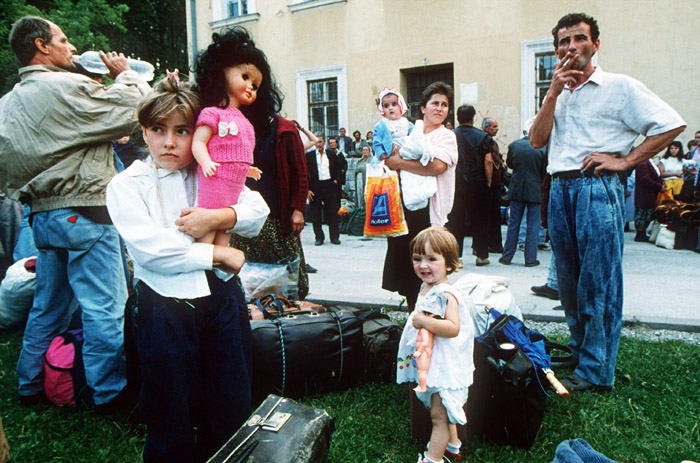
Bosnian refugees photographed in 1993

The press coverage surrounding the evacuation was later cited as an example of "disaster pornography", in academic analyses concerned with the portrayal of child victims of violence and disaster in ways that reaffirm those victims' remoteness from and subjectivity to western (here, Northwestern European) agency. In a similar vein, Dominic Strinati has presented the press interest in Operation Irma as evidence of a popular appetite for news stories that resemble the structure and tone of fictional narratives on war: "War films work most effectively ... by stripping back the too easily confusing contextual details of a conflict and focusing instead on the 'existential' problem of the protagonist's experience – the problem of being human in dehumanising circumstances ... News reporting – in this case from the Balkans – then has to compete even at the level of basic comprehension with this already established way of understanding things ... It may not be surprising, therefore, that one of the most memorable news 'stories' to come out of Bosnia was that of Irma, a rescued child." The operation has also been portrayed as representative of a trend whereby public reaction to media coverage of disasters leads and shapes official state response, even precipitating the creation of policy where none has existed before. Erica Burman, developing this theme, has argued that Irma Hadžimuratović became an "emotional focus" for a British public dismayed by its government's ambiguous and cautious attitude to the conflict in Bosnia:

The widespread anxieties and consternation over government inactivity throughout the crisis could be deflected and resolved by rescuing a handful of children. In terms of recovering a sense of agency (in a conflict characterised by protestations of powerlessness by political and military authorities alike), the desire to do (and be seen to do) something was expressed and assuaged by transporting and incorporating some of the need and distress into the UK where it could be tended to and made better.

A textbook on public relations cites the episode as an example of a "bargaining game" in which various players – the UNHCR, British government, and press – all sought to achieve individual advantage.

Despite initial improvement, Irma Hadžimuratović was paralyzed from the neck down and required a ventilator to breathe. She died of septicaemia in Great Ormond Street on 1 April 1995, aged seven, following twenty months in intensive care. The coroner at her inquest called her "a victim of war".
