= Irma Kukkasjärvi =

Finnish textile artist (1941–2011)

- Born: Irma Anneli Hilska; 8 February 1941; Helsinki, Finland
- Died: 8 October 2011 (aged 70); Helsinki, Finland
- Known for: Textile art and design
- Awards: Textile artist of the year (1984); Pro Finlandia (1985)

Irma Kukkasjärvi (née Hilska; 8 February 1941 – 8 October 2011) was a Finnish textile artist, considered a leading designer and innovator in modern textile art in Finland and internationally.

== Education ==
Having trained in the early 1960s first in handicrafts, and later in weaving, Kukkasjärvi went on to study at the Institute of Industrial Arts (now part of the Aalto University School of Arts, Design and Architecture), from where she graduated in 1968.

== Career ==
Upon graduation Kukkasjärvi set up as a freelance designer. Over the next two decades or more, she produced numerous designs for leading Finnish interior design companies such as Arola and Marimekko.

Kukkasjärvi is noted for her innovative use of different materials and techniques, as well as for collaborating with architects on holistic building interior designs.

She is also known for her traditional Finnish ryijy tapestry designs. Her signature design employed gradation from one colour to another, or from dark hue to light.

Kukkasjärvi focused especially on creating large-scale designs for public buildings and other high-profile public and corporate projects. These include works in the Parliament of Finland buildings, at the Finnish Presidential residence Mäntyniemi, and many others.

In the mid-1990s, she held the professorship in textile arts at her alma mater.

== Exhibiting ==
Kukkasjärvi was the only textile artist from the Nordic countries to exhibit at the VII Biennale Internationale de la Tapisserie in Lausanne, Switzerland, in 1975.

She gave her first solo exhibition, titled 'Dialogues', in 1986 in Helsinki.

Kukkasjärvi's works are included in the permanent collections of many museums and galleries, including the Finnish National Gallery.

== Awards and recognition ==
In 1984, Kukkasjärvi was named the textile artist of the year, by the Finnish textile artists' association Texo.

In 1985, she was awarded the Pro Finlandia medal of the Order of the Lion of Finland.
